= Chesapeake and Ohio Canal =

Canal in Washington, D.C., and Maryland

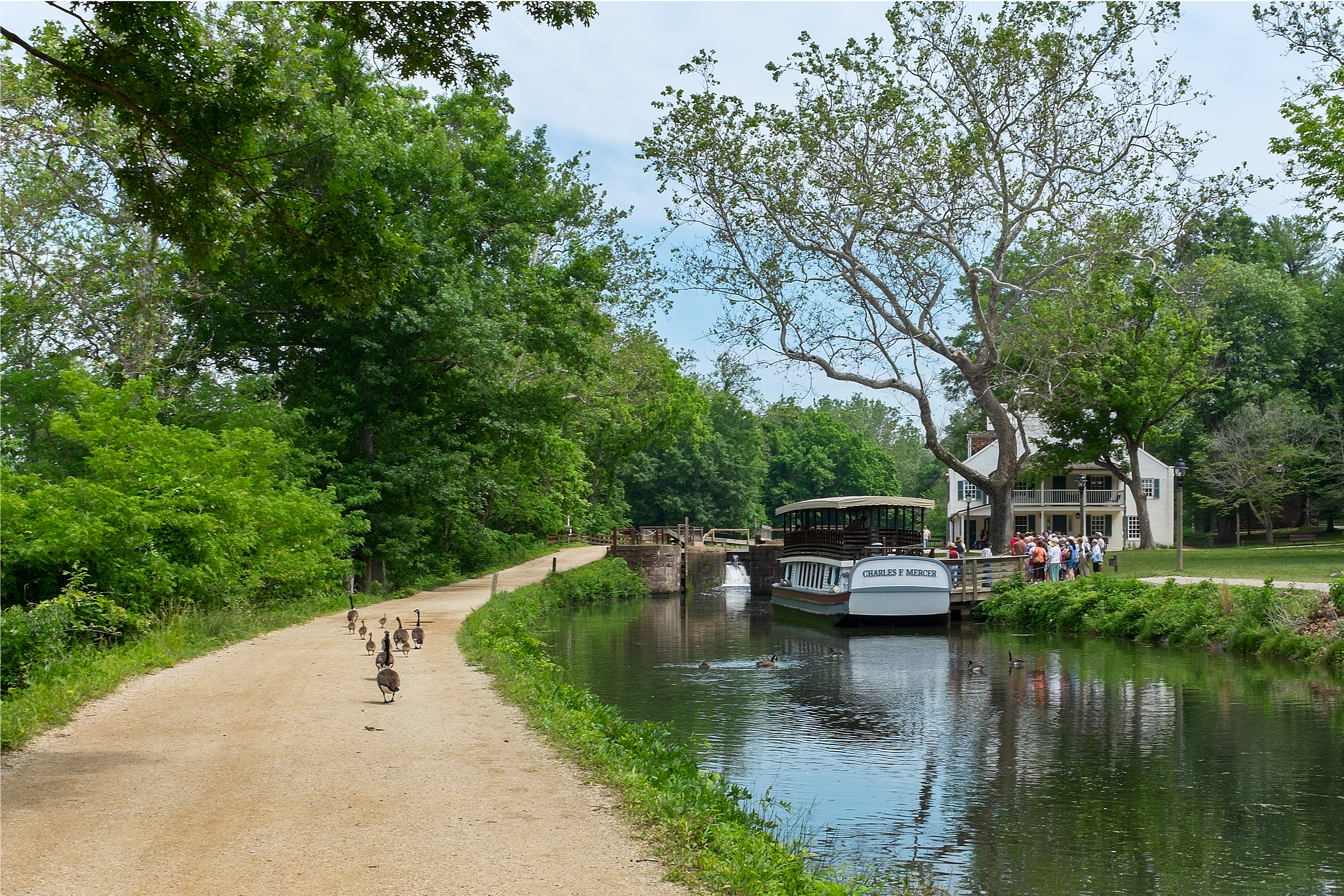
- The Chesapeake and Ohio Canal in Great Falls
- Interactive map of Chesapeake and Ohio Canal

Specifications
- Length: 184.5 miles (296.9 km)
- Maximum boat length: 90 ft 0 in (27.43 m)
- Maximum boat beam: 14 ft 6 in (4.42 m)
- Locks: 74 (Boats must pass guard locks 4 & 5 for each trip.)
- Status: National Park

History
- Original owner: Chesapeake and Ohio Canal Company
- Principal engineer: Benjamin Wright
- Other engineers: Charles B. Fisk, William Rich Hutton
- Date of act: 1825; 201 years ago
- Construction began: 1828; 198 years ago
- Date of first use: 1830; 196 years ago
- Date completed: 1850; 176 years ago
- Date closed: 1924; 102 years ago

Geography
- Start point: Georgetown, Washington, D.C. (originally Little Falls Branch) (Canal extended down to Georgetown in 1830)
- End point: Cumberland, Maryland (originally sections to Pittsburgh, Pennsylvania)
- Connects to: Alexandria Canal (Virginia), Goose Creek, and Little River Navigation

The 1917 video "Down the Old Potomac (Part 1 of 3)" shows the canal during its operating days. Some of the information is inaccurate. For example, it says that "barges" (more correctly "boats") passed through 86 locks descending 800 feet to tidewater; in fact, there were 77 locks descending 610 feet.

The Chesapeake and Ohio Canal, abbreviated as the C&O Canal and occasionally called the Grand Old Ditch, operated from 1831 until 1924 along the Potomac River between Washington, D.C., and Cumberland, Maryland. It replaced the Patowmack Canal, which shut down completely in 1828, and could operate during months in which the water level was too low for the former canal. The canal's principal cargo was coal from the Allegheny Mountains.

Construction began in 1828 on the 184.5-mile (296.9 km) canal and ended in 1850 with the completion of a 50-mile (80 km) stretch to Cumberland, although the Baltimore and Ohio Railroad had already reached Cumberland in 1842. The canal had an elevation change of 605 feet (184 meters) which required 74 canal locks, 11 aqueducts to cross major streams, more than 240 culverts to cross smaller streams, and the 3,118 ft (950 m) Paw Paw Tunnel. A planned section to the Ohio River in Pittsburgh was never built.

The canal is now maintained as the Chesapeake and Ohio Canal National Historical Park, with a trail that follows the old towpath.

== History ==
=== Early river projects ===
After the American Revolutionary War, George Washington was the chief advocate of using waterways to connect the Eastern Seaboard to the Great Lakes and the Ohio River, which flows into the Mississippi River and ultimately to the Gulf of Mexico at New Orleans. In 1785, Washington founded the Potowmack Company to improve the navigability of the Potomac River. His company built five skirting canals around the major falls: Little Falls, which was later incorporated in the C&O Canal, Great Falls in Virginia, Seneca Falls opposite Violette's lock, Payne's Falls of the Shenandoah, and House's Falls near Harpers Ferry. These canals allowed an easy downstream float; upstream journeys, propelled by pole, were harder.

Several kinds of watercraft were used on the Patowmack Canal and in the Potomac River. Gondolas were 60 by 10 ft (18 by 3 m) log rafts, usually sold at journey's end for their wood by their owners, who returned upstream on foot. Sharpers were flat-bottomed boats, 60 by 7 ft (18 by 2 m), usable only on high-water days, about 45 days per year.

=== Construction ===
==== Planning ====
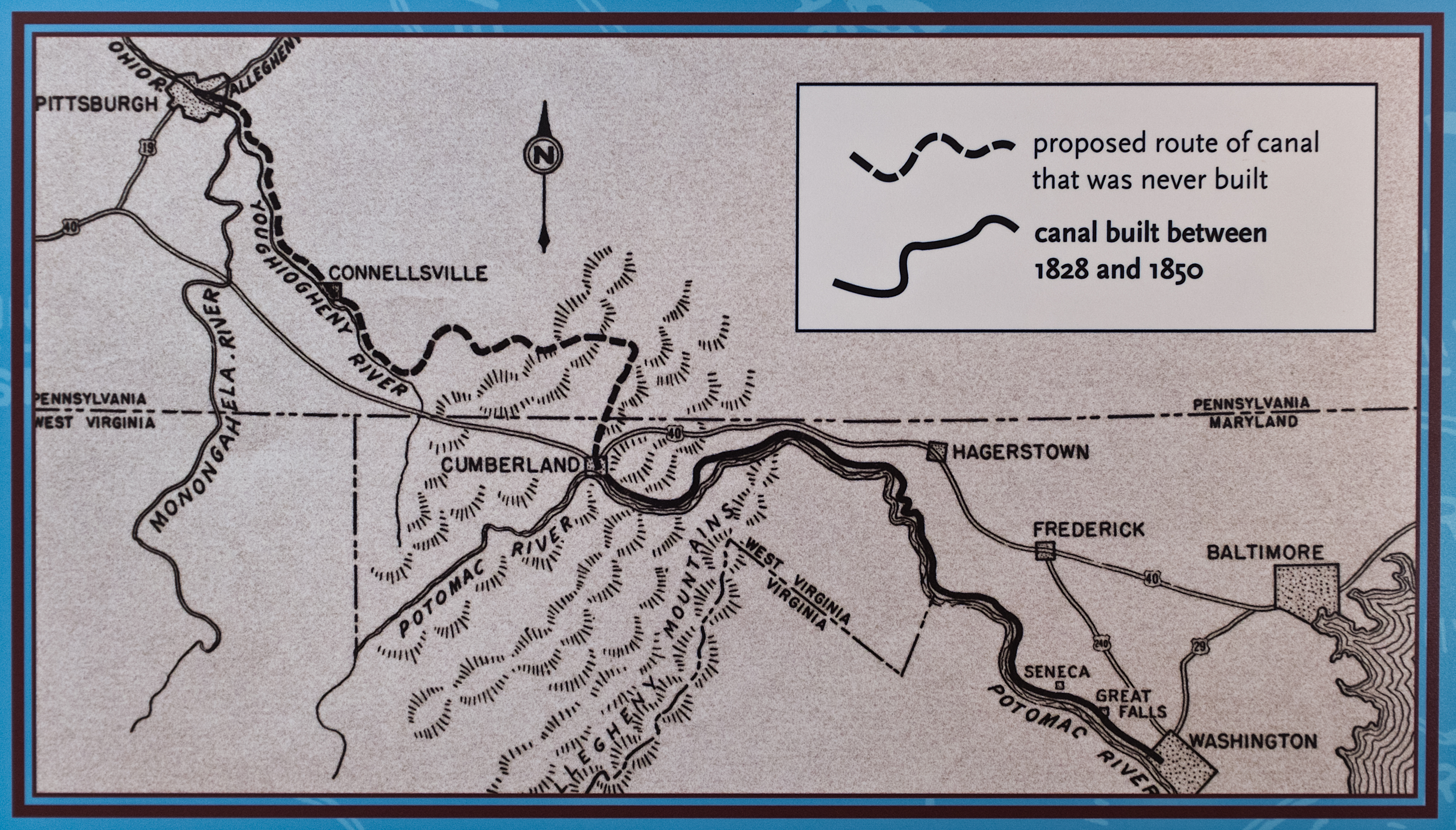
Map of the canal's 'planned route

The Erie Canal, built between 1817 and 1825, threatened traders south of New York City, who began to seek their own transportation infrastructure to link the burgeoning areas west of the Appalachian Mountains to mid-Atlantic markets and ports. In 1820, plans began being made for a canal to link the Ohio River and Chesapeake Bay.

In early March 1825, President James Monroe signed the bill chartering the construction of the C&O Canal as one of the last acts of his presidency. The plan was to build it in two sections, the eastern section from the tidewater of Washington, D.C., to Cumberland, Maryland; and the western section over the Allegheny Mountains to the Ohio River or one of its tributaries. Free from taxation, the canal company was required to have 100 miles (160 km) in use in five years, and to complete the canal in 12 years. The canal was engineered to have a 2 miles per hour (3 km/h) water current, supplying the canal and assisting mules pulling boats downstream.

The eastern section was the only part to be completed.

On October 23, 1826, the engineers submitted the study, presenting the proposed canal route in three sections. The eastern section comprised Georgetown to Cumberland; the middle section, Cumberland (going up Wills Creek to Hyndman then across the Sand Patch Grade crossing the Eastern Continental Divide to Garrett) to the confluence of the Casselman River and the Youghiogheny River; and the western section from there to Pittsburgh.

Section	Distance	Ascent & Descent	# of Locks	Cost
Eastern	185 Mi 1078 Yds	578 Feet	74	$8,177,081.05
Middle	70 Mi 1010 Yds	1961 Feet	246	$10,028,122.86
Western	85 Mi 348 Yds	619 Feet	78	$4,170,223.78
Total:	341 Mi 676 Yds	3158 Feet	398	$22,375,427.69

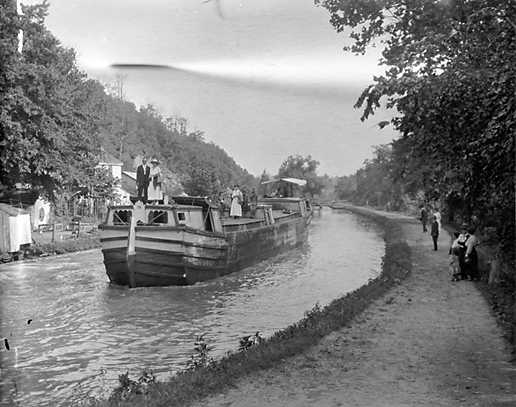
A boat on the canal, circa 1900-1924

The total estimated price tag, more than $22 million, dampened the enthusiasm of many supporters, who were expecting an estimate in the $4 million to $5 million range. At a convention in December 1826, they attempted to discredit the engineers' report, and offered lower estimates: Georgetown to Cumberland, $5,273,283; Georgetown to Pittsburgh, $13,768,152. Geddes and Roberts were hired to make another report, which they gave in 1828: $4,479,346.93 for Georgetown to Cumberland. With those numbers to encourage them, the stockholders formally organized the Chesapeake and Ohio Canal Company in June 1828. In the end, the final construction cost to Cumberland in 1850 was $11,071,075.21. Compared to the original cost given by the engineers in 1826 of about $8 million, removing things not in the estimate such as land purchases, engineering expenses, incidental damages, salaries, and fencing provision, the cost overrun was about 19%, which can be justified by the inflation rate of the period. The cost overrun of the other proposal (Geddes and Roberts) was about 51% thus showing that the original engineer's estimate was good.

In 1824, the holdings of the Patowmack Company were ceded to the Chesapeake and Ohio Company. (Rejected names for the canal included the "Potomac Canal" and "Union Canal".) By 1825, the Canal Company was authorized by an act of the General Assembly of Maryland in the amount of subscriptions of $500,000; this paved the way for future investments and loans. According to historians, those financial resources were expended until the State had prostrated itself on its own credit.

==== Groundbreaking ====
The C&O's first chief engineer was Benjamin Wright, formerly chief engineer of the Erie Canal. A groundbreaking ceremony was held on July 4, 1828, attended by U.S. president John Quincy Adams. The ceremony was held near Georgetown, at the canal's eventual 5.64 miles (9.08 km) mark near Lock 6, the upstream end of the Little Falls skirting canal, and Dam No. 1.

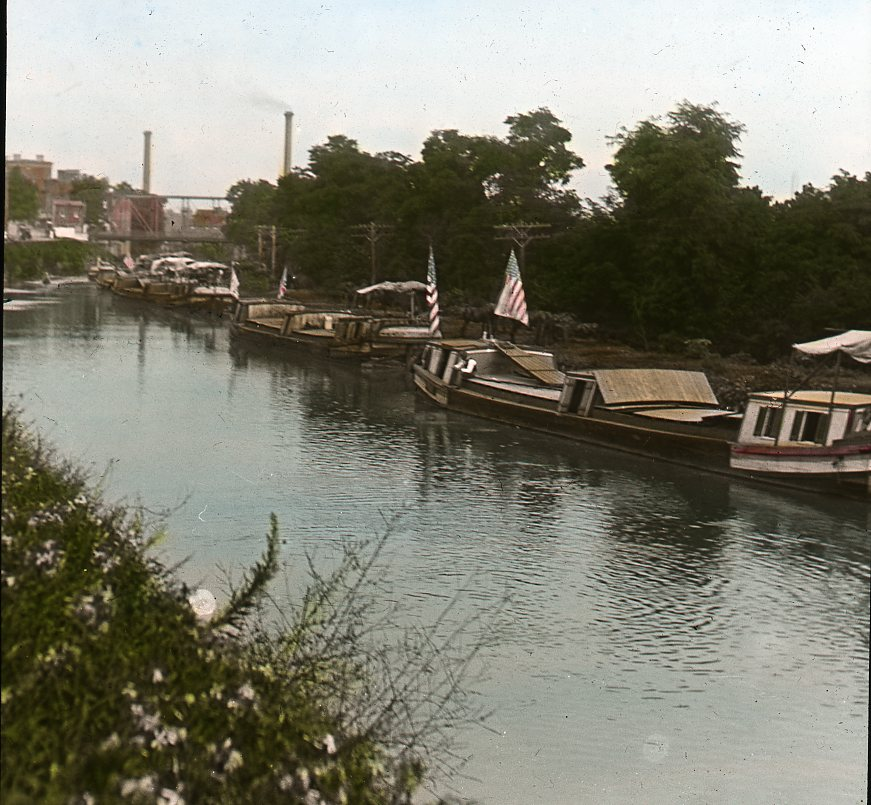
Canal boats waiting to be unloaded in Georgetown (Washington, D.C.)

At the groundbreaking, there was still argument over the eastern end of the canal. The directors thought that Little Falls (at the downstream end of the Patowmack Little Falls Skirting Canal) was sufficient since that literally fulfilled the charter's condition of reaching the tidewater, but people in Washington wanted it to end in Washington, connecting to the Tiber Creek and Anacostia river. For that reason, the canal originally opened from Little Falls to Seneca, and the next year, was extended down to Georgetown.

The Little Falls skirting canal, which was part of the Patowmack Canal, was dredged to increase its depth from 4 to 6 feet (1.2 to 1.8 m), and became part of the C&O Canal.

The first president of the canal, Charles F. Mercer, insisted on perfection since this was a work of national importance. This would cost the company more money to build the canal. During his term, he forbade the use of slackwaters for navigation, the use of composite locks (see section below), or reduction of the cross section of the canal prism in difficult terrain. This reduced maintenance expenditures but increased construction costs. In the end, two slackwaters (Big Slackwater above Dam No. 4, and Little Slackwater above Dam No. 5) and multiple composite locks (Locks 58–71) were built.

At first, the canal company planned to use steamboats in the slackwaters, since without mules, the canal boats had to use oars to move upstream. After much discussion of the dangers of early steamboats, the company provided a towpath so that the mules could pull the boats through the slackwaters.

==== Section numbers and contracts ====
From Lock 5 at Little Falls to Cumberland (as mentioned above, the canal started at Little Falls, and was later extended down to Georgetown), the canal was divided into three divisions (of about 60 miles (100 km) apiece), each of which was further divided into 120 sections of about 0.5 miles (800 m). A separate construction contract was issued for each section. Locks, culverts, dams, etc. were listed on the contracts by section number, not by mileage as is done today. For instance, Locks 5 and 6 are on Section No. 1, all the way to Guard Lock No. 8 on section 367. Sections A–H were in the Georgetown level below lock 5

==== First part opened ====
In November 1830, the canal opened from Little Falls to Seneca. The Georgetown section opened the following year.

==== Dispute for Point of Rocks; second part opened ====
In 1828, the C&O Canal and the Baltimore and Ohio Railroad (B&O) began fighting for sole use of the narrow strip of available land along the Potomac River from Point of Rocks to Harpers Ferry. After a Maryland state court battle that involved Daniel Webster and Roger B. Taney, the companies agreed to share the right-of-way.

In August 1829, the canal company began importing indentured laborers to Alexandria and Georgetown. These workers were promised meat three times a day, vegetables, and a "reasonable allowance of whiskey", $8 to $12 per month, $20 for masons. Still, many were dissatisfied with the slave-like conditions. Friction between the largest groups, from Ireland and Germany, meant they had to be kept in different crews.

The width of the canal prism above Harpers Ferry was reduced to 50 feet (15 m), which saved money and was also appropriate from an engineering standpoint.

In 1830, Francis Scott Key left his Georgetown home due to the newly opened canal, which ran through his back garden.

In 1832, the canal company prohibited liquor in a bid to improve the speed of construction, but soon repealed its ban.

In August or September 1832, an epidemic of cholera swept through the construction camps, killing many workers and leading others to throw down their tools and flee.

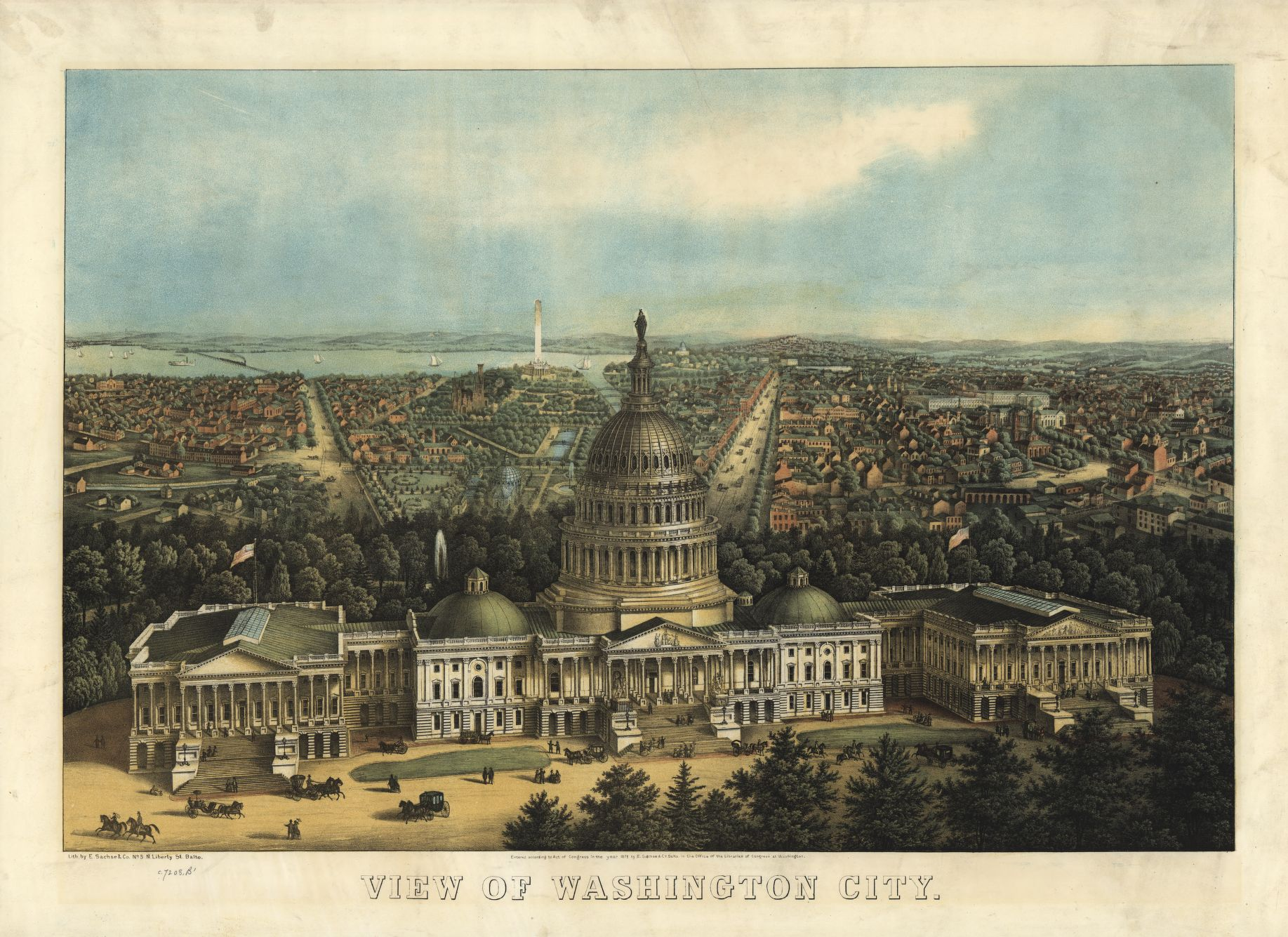
Low-angle bird's-eye view of central Washington toward the west and northwest with The Capitol in foreground. The Washington City Canal is visible running along the mall.

By 1833, the canal's Georgetown end was extended 1.5 miles (2.4 km) eastward to Tiber Creek, near the western terminus of the Washington City Canal, which extended through the future National Mall to the foot of the United States Capitol. A lock keeper's house at the eastern end of this Washington Branch of the C&O Canal remains at the southwest corner of Constitution Avenue and 17th Street, N.W., at the edge of the National Mall.

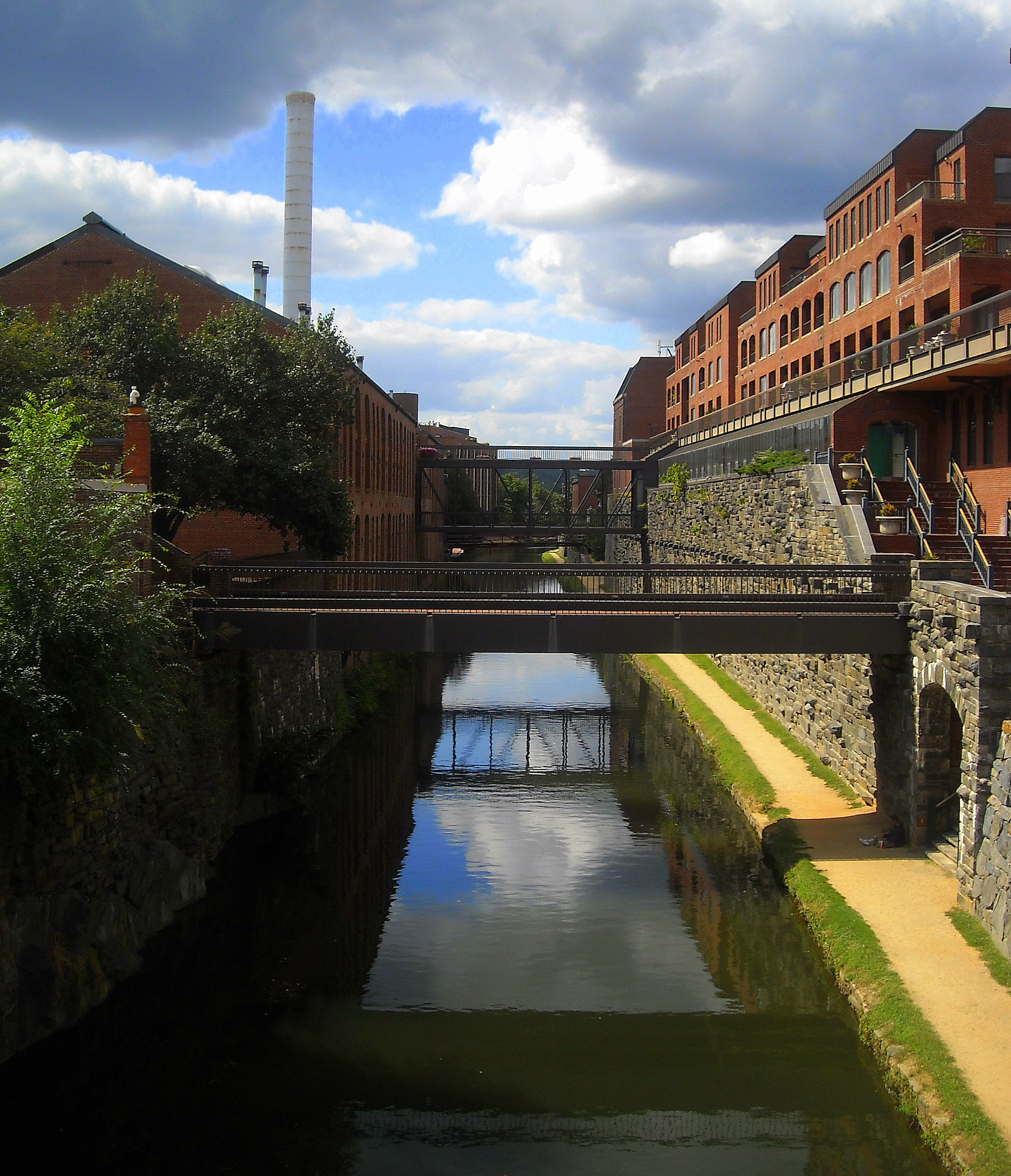
C&O Canal in the Georgetown neighborhood of Washington, D.C.

In 1834, the section to Harper's Ferry opened and the canal reached Williamsport.

In 1836, the canal was used by canal packets as a Star Route to carry mail from Georgetown to Shepherdstown. The contract was held by Albert Humrickhouse at $1,000 per annum for a daily service of 72 book miles. The canal approached Hancock, Maryland, by 1839.

In March 1837, three surveys were made for a possible link to the northeast to Baltimore: via Westminster, via Monocacy-Linganore, and via Seneca, but they were all deemed impractical due to lack of water at the summit level.

The Canal reached Dam No. 6 (west of Hancock) in 1839.

As the canal approached Hancock, more construction problems surfaced. Limestone sinkholes and caverns caused the canal bottom to cave in near Shepherdstown, near Two Locks above Dam No. 4, around Four Locks, Big pool, and Roundtop Hill near Dam No. 6. On 6 December 1839, Chief Engineer Fisk wrote, "These breaks have all evidently been occasioned by limestone sinks which exhibit themselves by a falling down of the bottom of the Canal into limestone caverns that are lower than, and extend out under the bed of the river: — in consequence of which the water from the Canal is at first conducted down below the canal bottom perhaps twenty or thirty feet and thence out along under the bed of the river ... It has been a matter of surprise to me that our Canal thus far has suffered so little from limesinks. We may yet however have much trouble from this source near and above the breach at Lock No. 37. For about a mile, there is scarcely a hundred feet in length of the canal in which there are not several small lime sink holes...". He recommended costly but necessary repairs, which were done by 1840.

Since it was difficult to obtain stone for the locks, engineers built composite locks, sometimes of kyanized wood.

In 1843, the Potomac Aqueduct Bridge was built near the present-day Francis Scott Key Bridge to connect the canal to the Alexandria Canal, which led to Alexandria, Virginia.

In April 1843, floods damaged much of the finished portion of the canal between Georgetown and Harpers Ferry, including the Shenandoah river lock. One flood suspended navigation for 103 days. The company raised the embankments around Little Falls, and made a "tumbling waste" near the 4-mile marker.

==== Last 50 miles ====
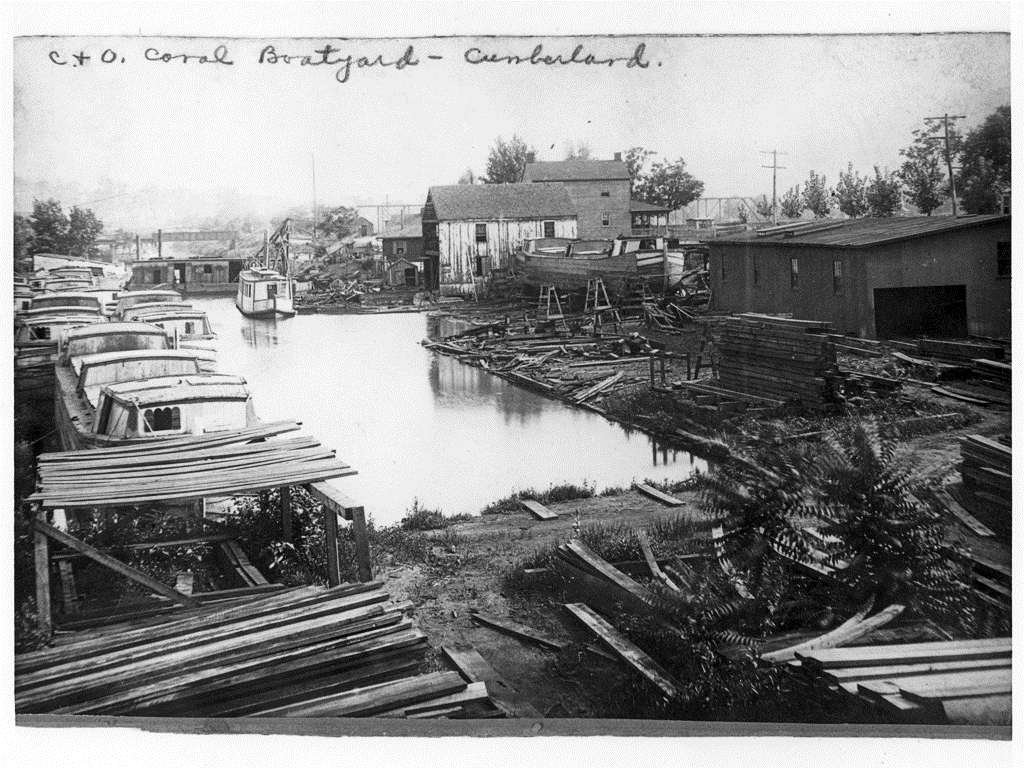
Boat construction yard in Cumberland, MD

Building the last 50-mile (80 km) segment proved difficult and expensive. Allen Bowie Davis took on the role of management. In Cumberland, Dam No. 8 and Guard Lock No. 8 had begun construction in 1837 and the final locks (70–75) to Cumberland were completed around 1840. That left an 18.5-mile (29.8 km) segment in the middle, which would eventually require building the Paw Paw tunnel, digging the deep cut at Oldtown, and building 17 locks.

Near Paw Paw, the engineers had no good solutions. If they followed the river, they would have to cross over to West Virginia to avoid the cliffs, and an agreement with the B&O Railroad specified that the canal would avoid the south side of the river, unless it was a place where the railroad would not need it. So they took the more expensive decision to build a tunnel through the mountain. The initial cost estimate of $33,500 proved far too low. The tunnel was completed for $616,478.65 Among the components of the project, a kiln was built to provide bricks to line the tunnel.

Map of Terminus in Cumberland in the mid 1890s. Yellow dots indicate modern highways as well as current (2013) location of Canal basin.

Originally, the company intended to go around Cumberland, behind the town of Wills Creek, but complaints from the citizens and the city caused the board to change their plans, routing the canal through the center of town.

The canal was opened for trade to Cumberland on Thursday, October 10, 1850. On the first day, five canal boats, Southampton, Elizabeth, Ohio, Delaware and Freeman Rawdon loaded with a total of 491 tons of coal, came down from Cumberland. In one day, the C&O carried more coal in the first day of business than the Lehigh Canal for their full year of business in 1820.

Yet in 1850, the B&O Railroad had already been operating in Cumberland for eight years, and the Canal suffered financially. Debt-ridden, the company dropped its plan to continue construction of the next 180 miles (290 km) of the canal into the Ohio Valley. The company long realized (especially with the experience at the Paw Paw tunnel) that construction over the mountains going to Pittsburgh was "wildly unrealistic". Occasionally there was talk of continuing the canal, e.g. in 1874, an 8.4-mile (13.5 km) long tunnel was proposed to go through the Allegheny Mountains. Nevertheless, there was a tunnel built to connect with the Pennsylvania canal.

Even though the railroad beat the canal to Cumberland, the canal was not entirely obsolete. It wasn't until the mid-1870s that improved technology, specifically with larger locomotives and air brakes, allowed the railroad to set rates lower than the canal, and thus seal its fate.

Sometime after the canal opened in 1850, a commemorative obelisk was erected near its Georgetown terminus.

=== Intervening years ===
The canal deteriorated during the Civil War. In 1869, the company's annual report said, "During the last ten years little or nothing had been done toward repairing and improving lock-houses, culverts, aqueducts, locks, lock-gates and waste weirs of the Company; many of them had become entirely unfit for use and were becoming worthless, rendering it absolutely essential to the requirements of the Company to have them repaired." Still, some improvements were made in the late 1860s, such as replacing Dams No. 4 and 5.

The early 1870s, which Unrau calls the "Golden Years", were particularly profitable. The company repaid some of its bonds. It made many improvements to the canal, including the installation of a telephone system. Yet there were still floods and other problems. By 1872, so many vessels were unfit for navigation that the company required boats to undergo annual inspections and registration. In July 1876, the crew of the Lezan Ragan stayed afloat while loading in Cumberland only by her crew's pumping. She hit some abutments of the locks near Great Falls, and finally sank at the opening Lock 15 (at the head of Widewater).

For a brief period in the 1860s and 1870s, the company attempted to prevent boating on Sundays. But boatmen broke padlocks on the lock gates and turned to violence when confronted. The company gave up trying to enforce the rule.

The trip from Cumberland to Georgetown generally took about seven days. The fastest known time from Georgetown to Cumberland for a light boat was 62 hours, set by Raleigh Bender from Sharpsburg. Dent Shupp made it from Cumberland to Williamsport in 35 hours with 128 tons of coal.

=== Receivership ===
Following the disastrous flood of 1889, the canal company entered receivership with court-appointed trustees. The trustees were given the right to repair and operate the canal under continued court oversight. The trustees represented the majority owners of the C&O Canal Company bonds issued in 1844. While the B&O owned the majority of the 1878 bonds, the B&O did not own a majority of the 1844 bonds as of 1890. However, by 1903, the B&O had acquired sufficient bonds to become "a majority holder", the reported reason being "to secure for the Wabash [railroad] system a foothold on the Atlantic seaboard" which had only been incorporated in February 1903.

Over the next decade, and particularly after 1902, boats on the canal shifted from independent operators to company-owned craft. Boats with colorful names (Bertha M. Young or Lezen Ragan) gave way to numbered craft ("Canal Towage Company" with a number) run by a schedule.

Despite the B&O's status as a majority bondholder, the B&O can not be said to have ever owned the C&O. This did not stop the B&O from trying to sell it. In 1936, the B&O attempted to sell part of the canal from Point of Rocks to the District line. This was blocked by the courts which had continued to oversee the C&O trustees with the court saying "It is of course well known that the Baltimore and Ohio Railroad Company is not the owner of the Chesapeake and Ohio Canal." At that time, the court also stated that the canal could not be sold in pieces but only in its entirety. In 1938, new trustees were appointed by the court to handle the sale under the court's continued oversight.

== Tolls and revenue ==
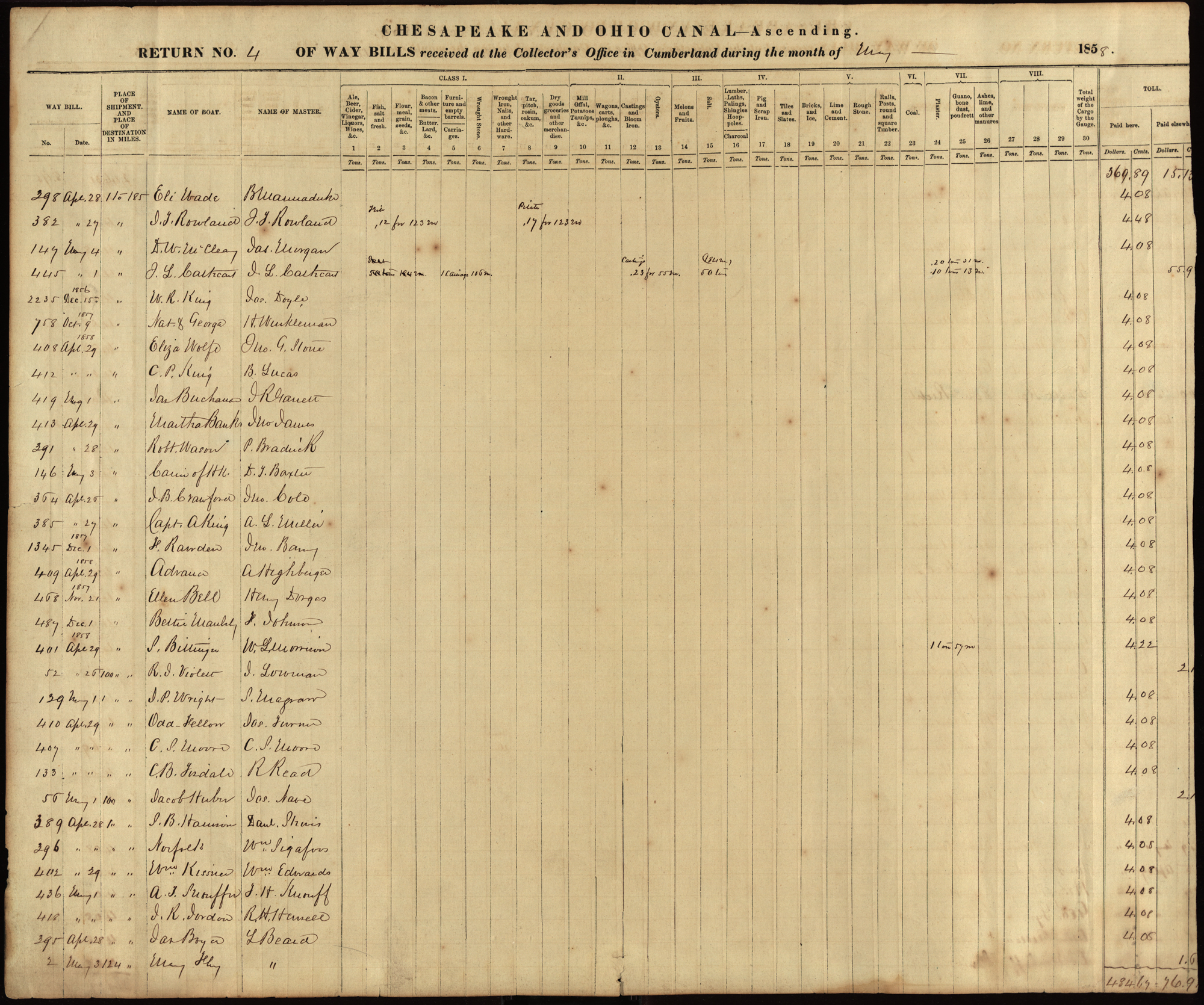
Register of waybills in the Cumberland Office, in 1858. Each canal boat had to have a waybill, even if empty, for passage through the canal. Fines were levied for lack of a waybill.

Tolls were charged for cargo on the canal. In 1851, for instance, the toll rates on the Canal were set as follows:

Item	Per ton per mile, For first 20 miles	Per ton per mile thereafter
Coal	1/4 cent	1/4 cent
Slaughtered hogs, bacon & meat	2 cents	1 cent
Whiskey and spirits, fish fresh & salted	2 cents	1 cent
Salt	1 cent	3/4 cent
Fire brick	1 cent	1/2 cent
Bricks, ice	1 cent	1/4 cent
Sand, gravel, clay, earth, paving stones	1/4 cent	1/4 cent

Tolls varied greatly, and frequently the board adopted new toll rates.

Some boatmen would try to ship in the boats extra cargo not listed on the waybills to avoid tolls. In 1873, for instance, one boat got from Georgetown to Harpers Ferry with 225 hidden sacks of salt before the company found out.

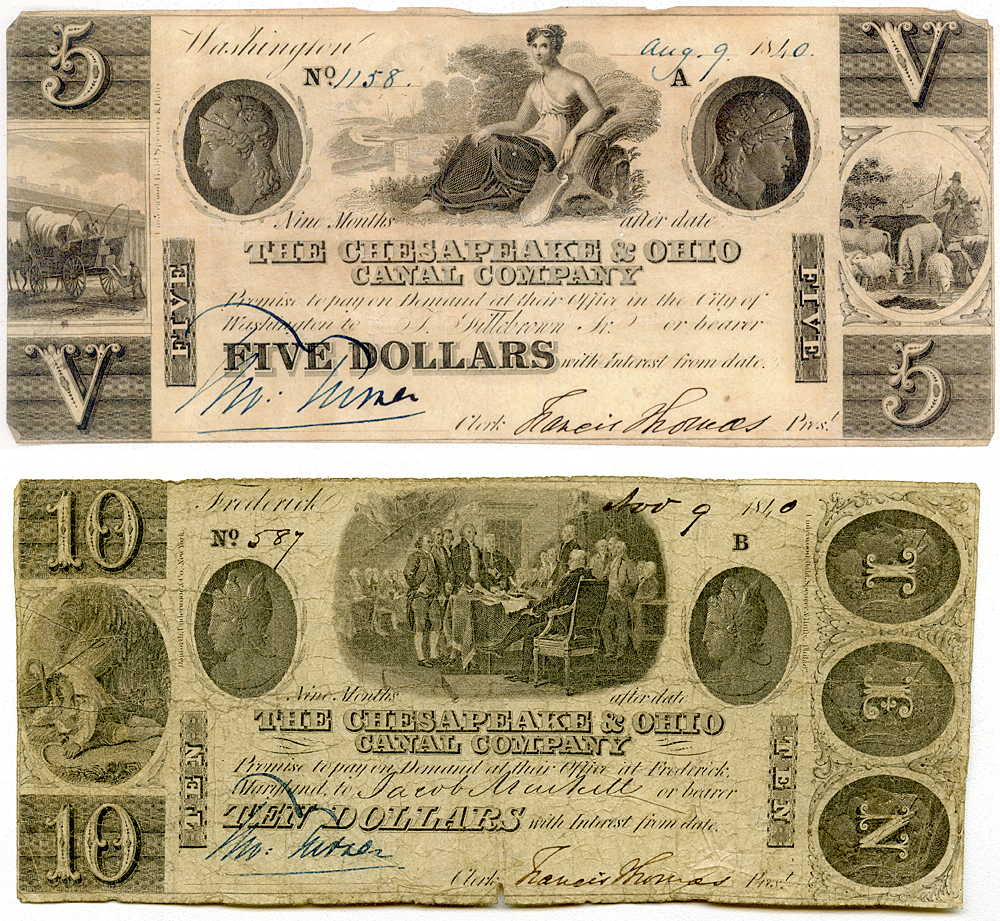
5 and 10 dollar notes, from C&O Canal company

The items transported on the canal varied. In 1845, for instance, before the canal's completion, the shipments were as follows:

Item sent downstream	Quantity	Items sent upstream	Quantity
Flour	170,464 barrels	Salted Fish	4,569 barrels
Wheat	299,607 bushels	Salt	1,265 tons
Corn	126,799 bushels	Plaster	4,721 tons
Oats	35,464 bushels	Lumber	820,000 feet, board measure
Mill Offal	38,575 bushels	Potatoes	2,511 bushels
Corn Meal	16,327 bushels	Bricks	118,225 units
Pork	15,250 pounds	Wheat	1,708 bushels
Lumber	508,083 feet, board measure	Oysters	1,351 bushels
Stone	12,060 perches		

=== Business after 1891 ===
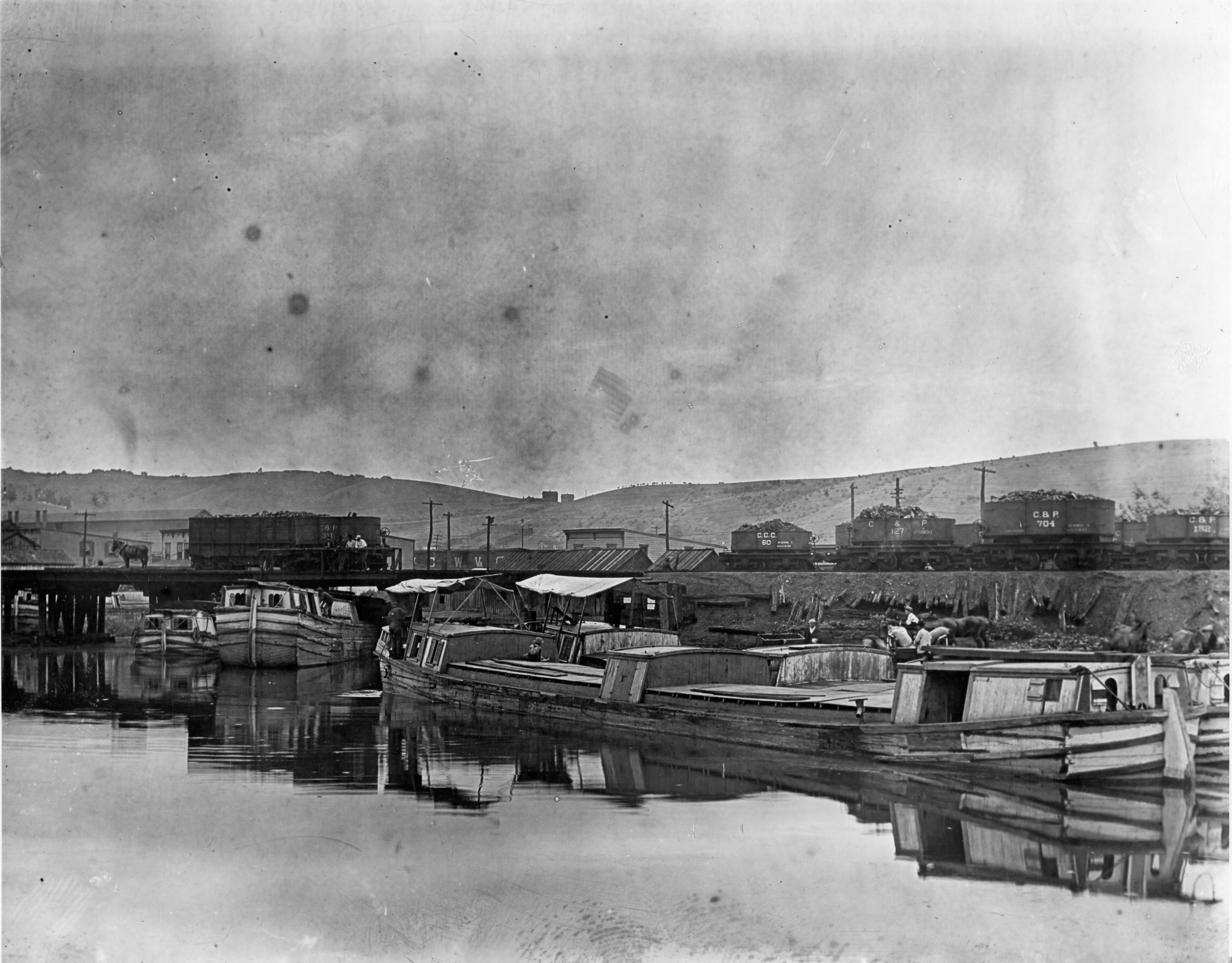
Loading coal on canal boats in Cumberland.

After 1891, the canal principally transported coal, and sometimes West Virginia limestone, wood, lumber, sand, and flour. (Statistics were only kept for coal.) Coal was loaded in the Cumberland basin, which consisted of dumping four carloads of coal into the boat. Some of the coal had to be shoveled by hand into the spaces beneath the cabins. During the loading process, nobody would be on the boat due to the dust, and mules were kept off, in case the boat sank from being loaded. Despite closing windows, dust usually entered the cabins. After loading, the ridge poles would be put, then the hatches over the ridge poles and openings. The crew would scrub down the boat (using water from the canal) to remove the dust, and the boat would be poled to the other side of the basin, where it would be hitched to the mules.

Boatmen came down to lock 5, called "Willard's lock" or "Waybill Lock", whereupon the lock tender would sign the waybill, and report it to the office. If they did not get orders at that lock, they waited near the aqueduct bridge in Georgetown, until orders came through. A tugboat on the river would pull the boats to other points, e.g. Navy Yard, Indian Head and Alexandria. Some coal loads were unloaded directly in the Georgetown coal yards, using buckets. Coal was also unloaded onto ocean sailing vessels bound for Massachusetts (which brought ice, and returned with coal), a 4 masted vessel holding about 20 boatloads of coal.

In the last few years, the tonnage and tolls for coal were as follows

Year	Coal Tonnage (tons)	Tolls collected (US$)
1914	171,062	42,236.97
1915	173,997	41,271.46
1916	158,036	38,956.77
1917	151,667	40,545.74
1918	138,087	71,404.43
1919	133,529	47,346.95
1920	127,871	62,102.38
1921	66,477	42,017.33
1922	Unavailable	3,435.18
1923	56,404	31,899.32
1924	Unavailable	1,215.60

One of the more unusual loads was a circus with about 9 people with their equipment, which included a black bear. They were transported from Oldtown, Maryland to Harpers Ferry. The black bear got loose on the journey, and the boatman told them, "You tie that thing good or you're never going to get to Harpers Ferry, for I'm going to leave the boat."

Other loads included furniture (often second hand), pianos, a parlor suites, watermelons, fish (such as shad and herring), as well as transporting items such as flour or molasses to sell to lockkeepers, as some of the lockkeepers in remote areas needed the boats to bring their supplies. Cement from the Round Top Mill above Hancock was also shipped to Georgetown. Some would pole across the river at Dam No. 2 to get wood, cross-ties, bark (used in tanning), and sometimes grain. Other loads, often carried upstream, included 600 empty barrels in a boat, taken to Shepherdstown to load cement, lumber, fertilizer, and general merchandise for stores along the canal, as well as oysters in barrels, complete materials to build a house, ear corn, and even extra mules.

=== Fines ===
The company levied fines for infractions, such as traveling without a waybill or destruction of canal property such as lock gates or canal masonry. For instance:

- May 30, 1877, Capt. Thomas Fisher fined $10 (about US$423 in 2012) for passing through lock without waybill
- Oct 22, 1877, R. Cropley's scow, fined $25 for knocking out gate in Lock No. 5 [Brookmont Lock]
- Nov. 12, 1877, Capt. Joseph Little, fined $10 for running into crib at Lock No. 9 [Seven Locks]
- July 4, 1878, Boat John Sherman, fined $62.70 for unloading and raising (note: this was on Independence Day)
- Aug 30, 1878, Steamer Scrivenes, fined $50, Allowing the Bertha M. Young in tow to sink on Level 36 and abandoning her at night without giving notice, causing navigation to be suspended 36 hrs.
- May 5, 1879, Capt. Jacob Hooker fined $40, Running into and breaking gate at Lock No. 40
- Jan 14, 1880, Boat Harry & Ralph, fined $5, Running into gate at Darbey's Lock (Note: this was in winter, when the canal was usually drained for repairs.)
- Jun 12, 1880, G.L. Booth, fined $4.40, for pumping.

=== Business after 1924 ===
The last known boat to carry coal was Pat Boyer's Boat #5, which returned to Cumberland on November 27, 1923. The only boats recorded to operate in 1924 were five boats that carried sand from Georgetown to Williamsport to construct a power plant.

==== Flood of 1924 ====
The flood of 1924 caused major damage to the canal. Most of the railroad and canal bridges near Hancock were destroyed, a breach opened in Dam No. 1, and much damage to the banks and masonry of the canal occurred. Although the railroad did some maintenance, ostensibly so that the canal could quickly be restored to operation, mainly the Georgetown level (Dam No. 1 and below) was fixed to supply Georgetown's mills with water for operation. The rest of the canal remained in disrepair.

The boating season lasted only three months in 1924, and after the flood, navigation ceased. Unfortunately, some communities such as Glen Echo and Cumberland already used the canal to dump sewage, and G.L. Nicholson called the canal a "public nuisance" due to the sewage and being a breeding ground for mosquitoes.

In 1928–1929, there was some talk of restoring and reopening the canal from Cumberland to Williamsport, but with the onset of the Great Depression, the plans were never realized. In April 1929 after some freshet damage, the railroad repaired a break in the towpath, so that they could continue to flush out mosquitoes as demanded by the Maryland board of health.

The boatmen, now unemployed, went to work for railroads, quarries, farms, and some retired. At that date, the only other canal using mules, was the Lehigh Canal, which was soon to close in 1940.

Some of the lockkeepers stayed on, and there were a few canal superintendents were listed for the now disused canal.

==== Flood of 1936 ====
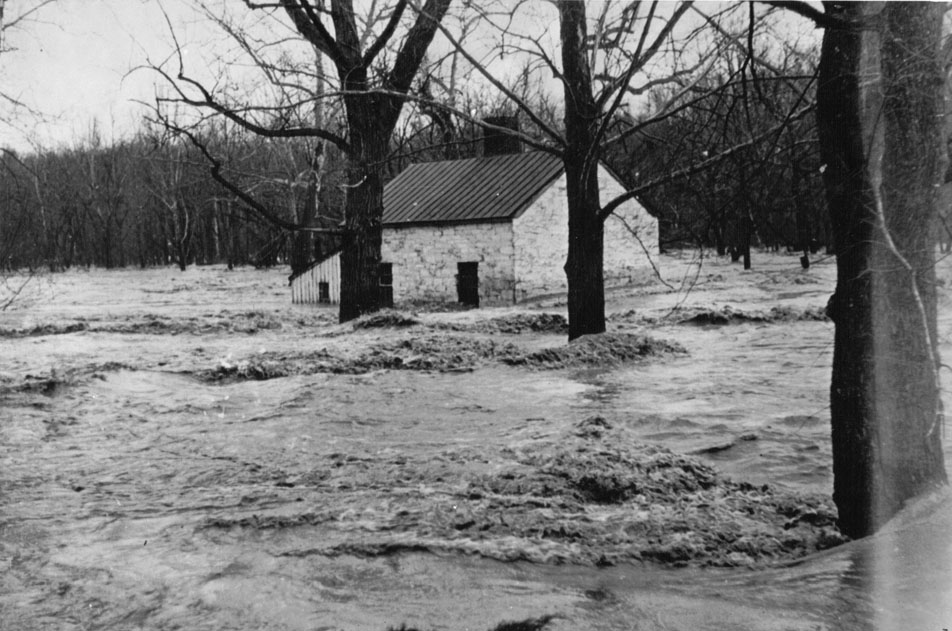
Floodwaters around Lock 6 in 1936

This winter flood in March 1936 caused even more damage to the abandoned canal, still recovering from the damage caused by the extreme floods just over a decade prior. This flood, caused by the thawing of earlier ice, combined with the flow of heavy rains, led to the highest water mark the Potomac River had ever had thus far, destroying lockhouses, levels, and other structures. There were some efforts at restoration, mainly to the Georgetown level so that the factories could have their water supply. Due to the inattention of the B&O Railroad, the canal became a "magnificent wreck" and would need intense repairs and reconstruction throughout many areas destroyed by the floods.

=== National Historical Park ===
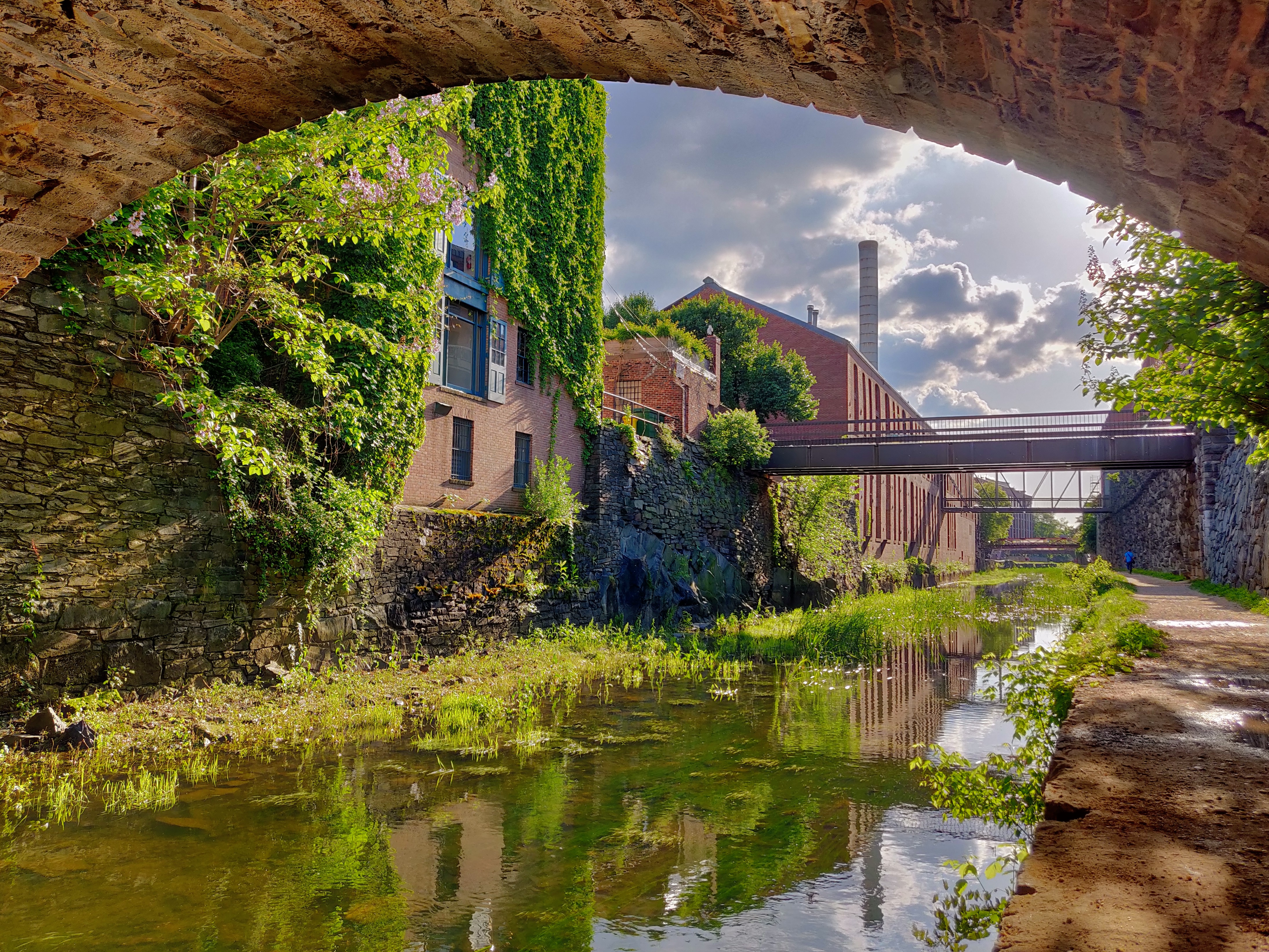
The canal in Georgetown in spring 2019

In 1938, the abandoned canal was obtained from the bondholders by the United States in exchange for a loan from the federal Reconstruction Finance Corporation, and is now the Chesapeake and Ohio Canal National Historical Park.

== Locks and engineering ==
=== Canal prism ===
The dimensions of the canal vary quite a bit. Below Lock 5, the width is 80 feet wide and 6 feet deep. Above Lock 5 to Harper's Ferry it is 60 feet wide and 6 feet deep, and above Harper's Ferry, 50 feet wide.

=== Lift locks and guard locks ===
To build the canal, the C&O Canal Company used a total of 74 lift locks that raised the canal from sea level at Georgetown to 610 feet (190 m) at Cumberland. Locks 8–27 and their accompanying lock houses were made from Seneca red sandstone, quarried from the Seneca Quarry, as was Aqueduct No. 1, better known as Seneca Aqueduct. This unique structure is the only aqueduct made from Seneca red sandstone and is doubly unique for being the only aqueduct on the C&O that is also a lock (Lock 24, Riley's Lock).

Seven guard locks, often called inlet locks (numbered 1 through 8) were built to allow water and sometimes boats (particularly at Big Slackwater and Little Slackwater) to enter. Dam #7 and Guard Lock #7 were proposed (near mile 164 at the South Branch of the Potomac) but never built. In 1856, there was a steam pump put at that site. Later, in 1872, a new steam pump was put near mile 174.

Three additional river locks were built, to allow boats to enter the canal at the river, as demanded by the Virginia legislature for buying canal stock. They were at Goose Creek (below Edwards Ferry, Lock 25), near the Shenandoah River just below Lock 33, and at Shepherdstown.

The Goose Creek locks were to allow boats from the Goose Creek and Little River Navigation Company to enter. Only one Goose Creek boat was documented to enter the C&O canal, and there is no documentation of a C&O boat entering Goose Creek. The lock was eventually converted into a waste weir.

The Shenandoah river (about 422 feet (129 m) below Lock 33) lock let boats cross to Harpers Ferry with the mules walking on the railroad bridge, up the Shenandoah river, to the old Potomac Canal Bypass on the Shenandoah river by Virginius island. The railroad refused to let mules walk on the bridge, and from lack of business, the lock was abandoned. Stones from that lock were used for other purposes.

After the 1889 flood destroyed the nearby dam in Shepherdstown, the raison d'être for the Shepherdstown lock was gone, and so it was filled in.

At night, lock tenders were required to remove the cranks and handles from all paddle valves to prevent unauthorized use.

==== Composite locks ====
Despite Mercer not wanting any composite locks, due to measures to economize on the last 50 miles (80 km) of construction, and the scarcity of good building stone, Locks 58–71 were constructed as composite locks, whereby the lock masonry is built of rubble and inferior undressed stone. Since that makes a rough surface which damages the boats, the locks were originally lined with wood to protect the boats. This wood sheathing had to be replaced. In time, some of the composite locks were lined with concrete, since the wood kept rotting.

=== Levels ===
The stretch of canal between locks is called a level. Canalers called these levels by their lengths; for instance, the longest level was the 14 mile level, which was about 14 miles long, and ran from Lock 50 (at 4 locks) to Lock 51 in Hancock. Some levels had additional nicknames (since some had similar lengths), e.g. "Four Mile Level below Dam 6", "Four Mile Level Big Slackwater", or "Four Mile Level of the Log Wall" (which is between locks 14 and 15, includes Widewater, Anglers, Carderock, Billy Goat Trails B, and C, and the downstream entrance to Trail A, all connect on that level). Levels less than a mile between locks were called short levels. Waste weirs and bypass flumes at the locks helped control the height of water in the levels (see below about waste weirs).

=== Feeders ===
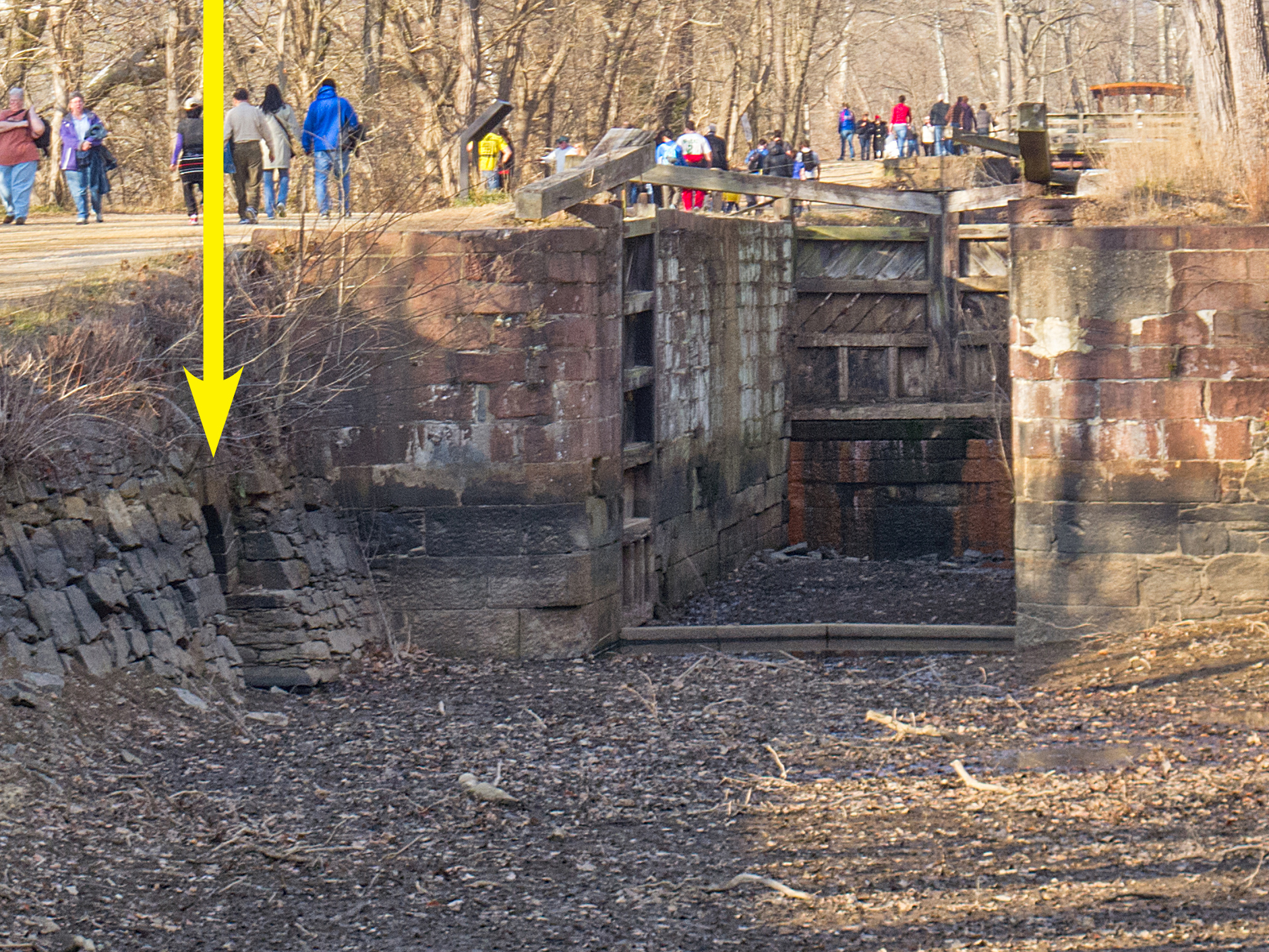
Great Falls feeder culvert (no longer used) indicated by yellow arrow(14.08 mi), and Lock 18 (R).

There were three streams used as feeders: Rocky Run feeder (section #9, around 7 Locks), Great Falls feeder (section #18) and the Tuscarora feeder (section #78). There was a contemplated feeder at the Monocacy (not built). Of course, the remains of the Potomac Company Little Falls skirting canal was used as a feeder also. Inlet Lock No. 2 is called the Seneca Feeder in historic documents.

The remains of the Tuscarora feeder can still be seen, but it was made redundant by Dam No. 3 and was no longer used.

=== Slackwater navigation ===
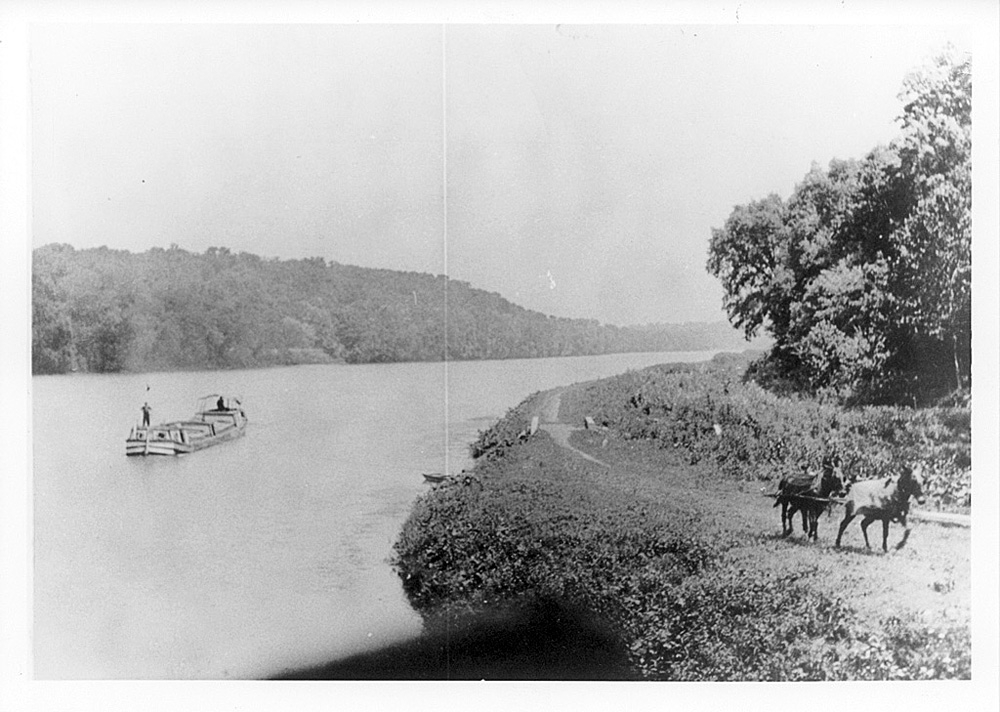
Boat at Big Slackwater

Despite Charles F. Mercer, two slackwaters were used for navigation: Big Slackwater at Dam No. 4, and Little Slackwater at Dam No. 5. Big Slackwater is about 3 miles (5 km) long, Little Slackwater is about 1/2 mile (800 m) long. The boats had to navigate despite winds, currents, and debris in the channel. In February 1837, the board of directors discussed using steam power in the slackwater for the boats, but instead decided on a permanent towpath. The towpath for Big Slackwater was completed in 1838 for $31,416.36, and the towpath for Little Slackwater was completed in 1839 for $8,204.40.

Little Slackwater was a tricky place to navigate. Not only did it have a lot of hairpin turns, but also just before Guard Lock No. 5, there was a strip of land in the water called "the pier" (that exists even today): loaded boats going downstream would have to go outside the pier, and unloaded boats on the inside, thus making steering difficult for the loaded boats to get into the lock. If the current was fast in the river it could go as fast as the boat, rendering the tiller useless, and thus, a boat could be almost impossible to steer. One man reported that at the slackwater, they had him sit at the front of the boat with a hatchet in case they had to cut the towline [since it would pull the mules into the river], and had a couple of [wooden] hatches turned upside down, so that they could escape to shore on the hatches. On 1 May 1903, the towline to Boat No. 6 broke, with Captain Keim, Mrs. Keim, their two daughters, and Harry Newkirk aboard. One daughter drowned, another suffered a broken leg, and the captain died later of injuries. The rest (including the mules aboard) survived.

Boatmen reported that it was easier to navigate in the slackwaters than the aqueducts, since there was room for the water to move around the boat. Places like aqueducts, where there was little room for the water to move, were difficult for the mules to pull the boat through.

=== Waste weirs, spillways, and informal overflows (mule drinks) ===
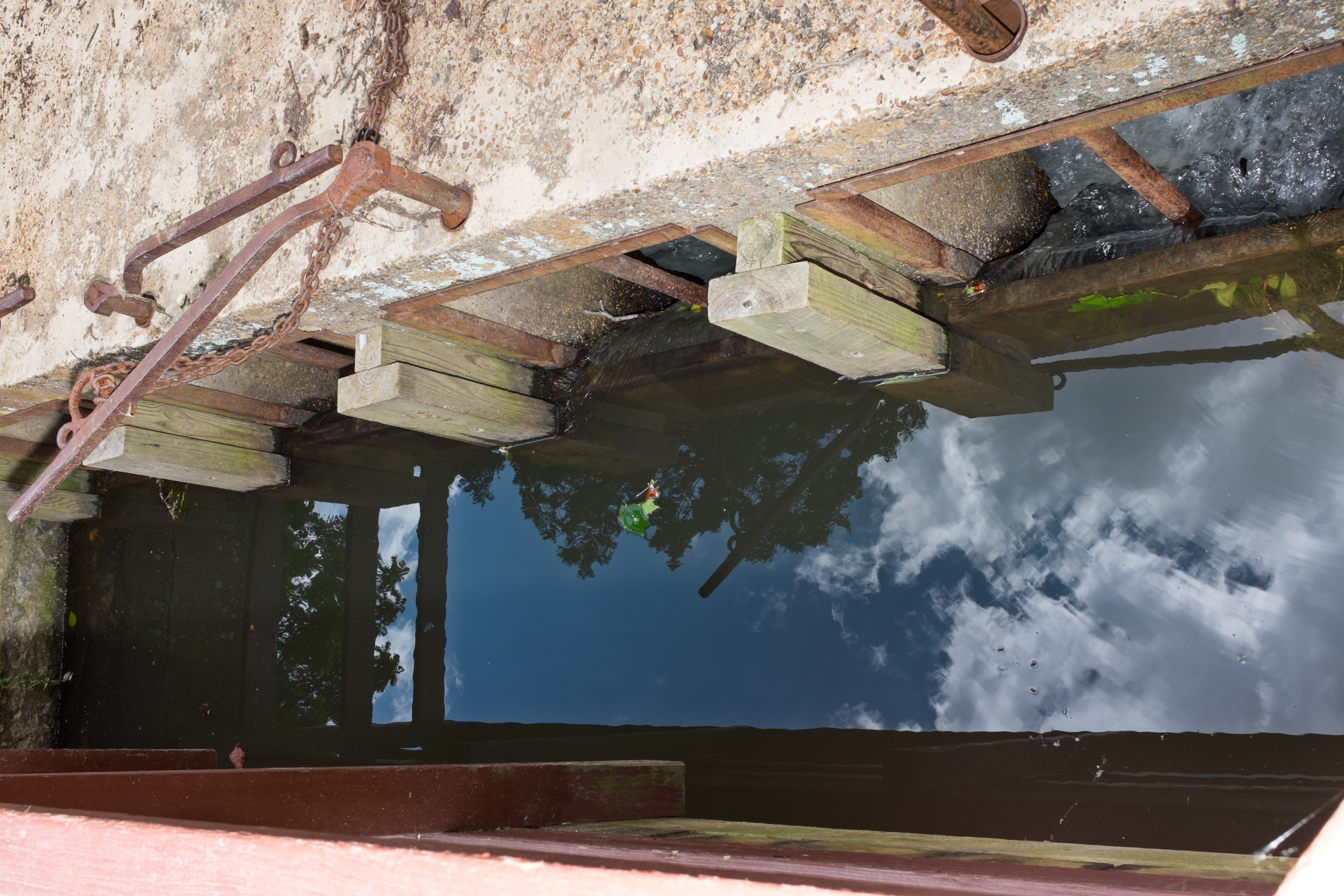
A waste weir, looking from above.

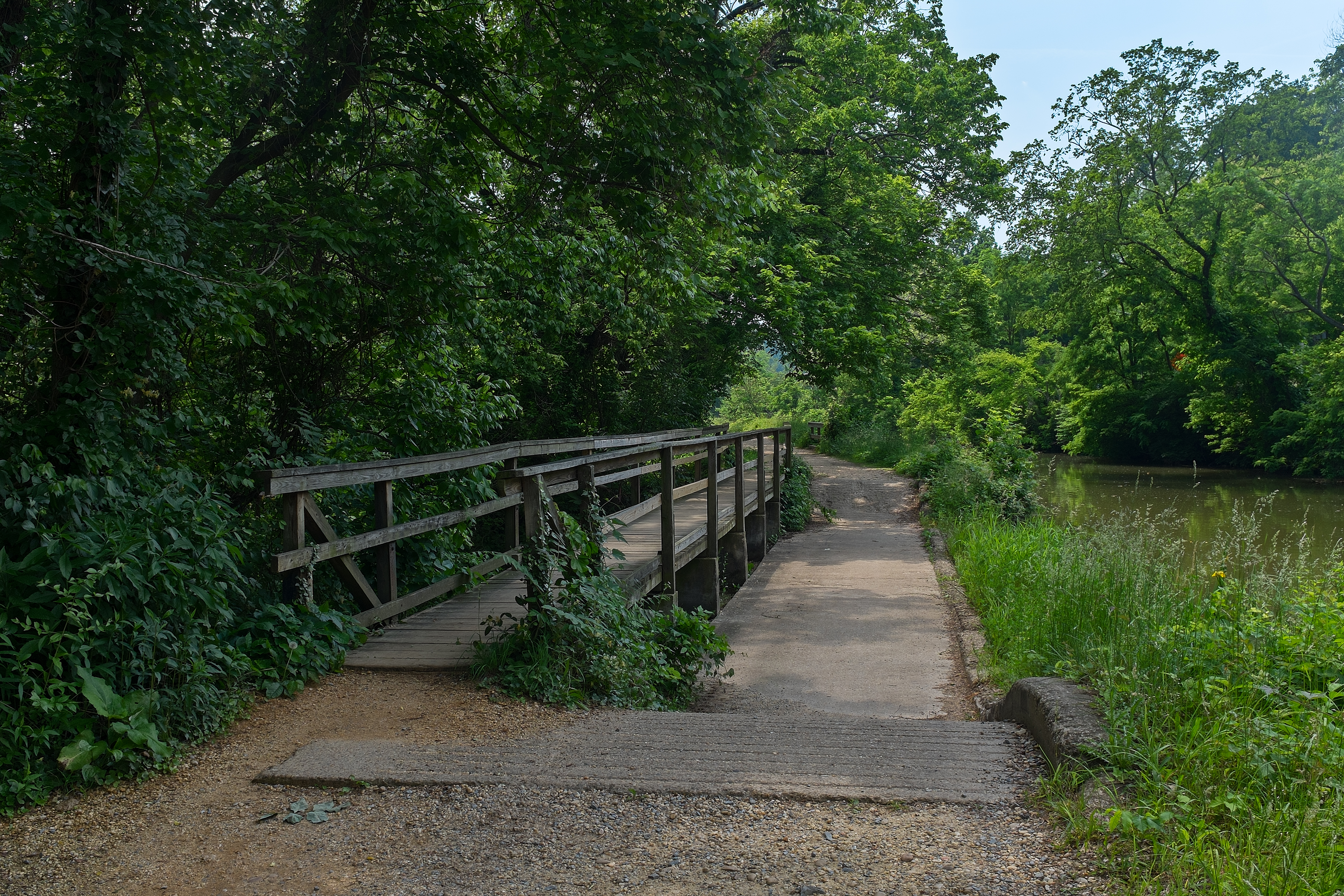
A spillway

To regulate the level of water in the canal prism, waste weirs, informal overflows, and spillways were used.

Waste weirs removed the surges of water from storms or excess when a lock was emptied. Boards could be removed or added to adjust the amount of water in the level. If one had to empty the whole level for winter, repairs, or emergencies, waste weirs often had paddle valves (similar to those found in locks) at the bottom which could be opened to let the water out.

Waste weirs come in several styles. Originally they were made of concrete masonry with boards on top making a bridge with mules to pass over. A possible example of an old-style waste weir (abandoned) is at 39.49 miles, above Lock 26 (Wood's Lock). Most of these old waste weirs were replaced with concrete structures in 1906. Another used to be at Pennyfield lock in 1909–1911.

Spillways are made of concrete, and can be on either side, but if on the towpath side, have a bridge so people (and mules) can cross without getting the feet wet. High water simply flows over the spillway and out of the canal. The longest spillway, near Chain Bridge, is 354 feet long, was made in 1830 (but has been worked on since). Another spillway near Foxhall road at mile 1.51, was made in 1835. The spillway and waste weir at Big Pool was built in the 1840s

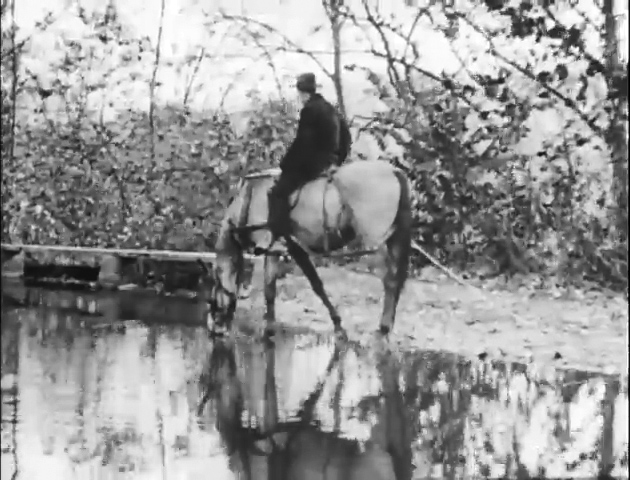
An informal overflow. The towpath dips, allowing water to flow over it. Note the boards in the background for people to walk on.

An informal overflow or mule drink was a dip in the towpath allowing water to flow over, similar to a spillway, but without the bridge or the concrete construction (hence, were more informal). The canalers called these "mule drinks". There are documented informal overflows at mileage 10.76, 49.70, and 58.08. These usually had a drainage ditch which was riprapped with stone to prevent erosion. Historically the towpath dropped two feet to form this overflow. Due to silting, construction, etc. many of these overflows are now difficult to find. Hahn states that clues to finding these overflows include: a gully without a culvert, a sudden lowering of the towpath, or the signs of riprap on the towpath or the gully itself. Many of these (e.g. the one at Pennyfield lock) were replaced by a waste weir.

=== Paw Paw tunnel ===
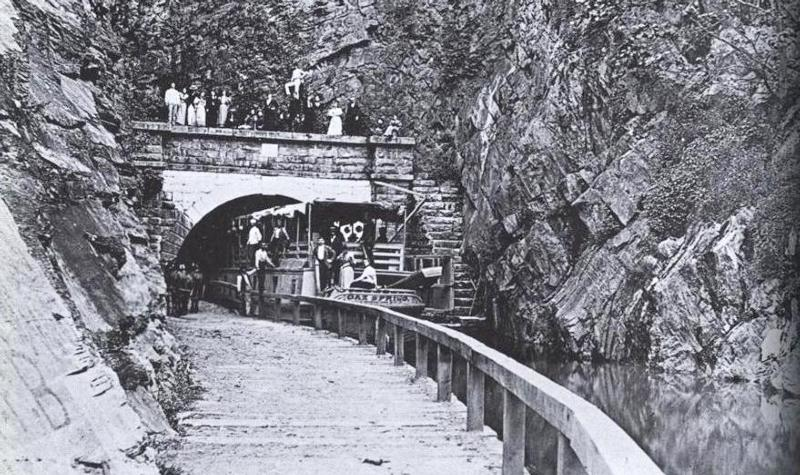
Paw Paw Tunnel

One of the most impressive engineering features of the canal is the Paw Paw Tunnel, which runs for 3,118 feet (950 m) under a mountain. Built to save six miles (10 km) of construction around the obstacle, the 3/4-mile (1,200 m) tunnel used over six million bricks. The tunnel took almost twelve years to build; in the end, the tunnel was only wide enough for single lane traffic. One notorious incident included two captains who refused to budge for several days. The company official threw green cornstalks onto a roaring fire at the upwind portion of the tunnel, smoking the offenders out.

=== Inclined plane ===
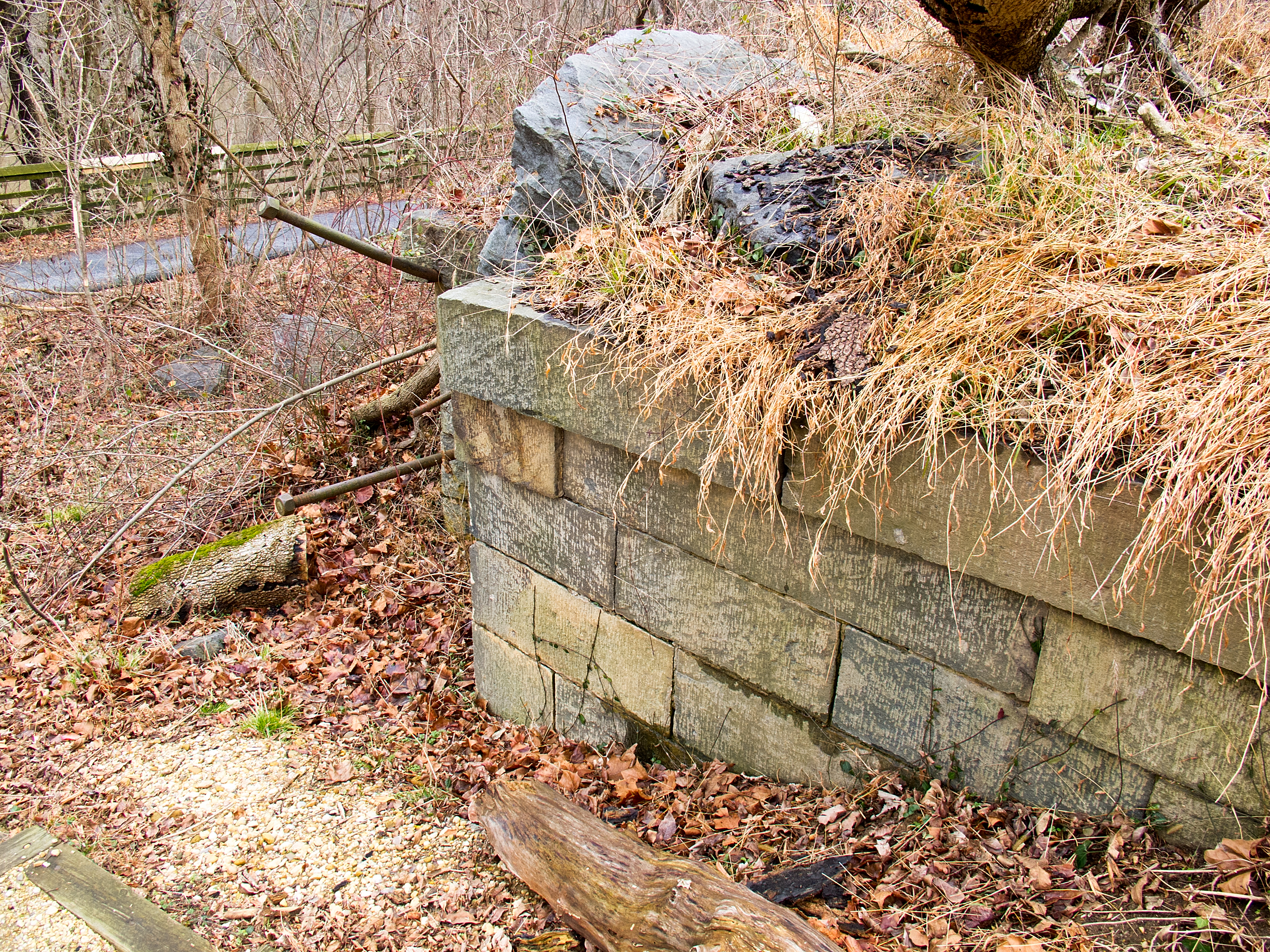
Remains of the inclined plane

Engineer William Rich Hutton was instrumental in getting the inclined plane built. Starting in 1875, a canal inclined plane was built two miles (3.2 km) upriver from Georgetown, so that boats whose destination was downriver from Washington could bypass the congestion (and price gouging of independent wharf owners) in Georgetown. Originally the company planned to build a river lock, but then discovered that such a lock occasionally would consume more water than the level could provide. They then planned to make an inclined plane, much like the Morris Canal. The first boat went through in 1876; 1,918 boats used the inclined plane that first year. Usage reports conflict: Hahn reports that was only really used for two years, and sporadically in 1889, yet Skramstad reports that due to flood damage in 1880 to the Rock Creek outlet, any boat until 1889 (when another flood wrecked the canal) going further down the Potomac than Georgetown, had to use the inclined plane. Although Hahn says it was the largest inclined plane in the world at that time, it was 600 feet (180 m) long, which is short compared to Plane 9 West of the Morris Canal at 1,500 feet (460 m). It originally used a turbine to power it (like the Morris Canal) but was later switched to use steam power.

The inclined plane was dismantled after a major flood in 1889 when ownership of the canal transferred to the B&O Railroad, which operated the canal to prevent its right of way (particularly at Point of Rocks) from falling into the hands of the Western Maryland Railway.

=== Telephone system ===
Following a major flood in 1877, the president of the canal, Arthur Pue Gorman, hired Baltimore telegraph pioneer J. Frank Morrison to build a communications line. The initial plan was for a telegraph, but due to rapid advances in technology, the project was changed to a telephone system which promised lower operating costs. Morrison's construction gangs worked through the summer of 1879, completing a line that stretched over 180 miles from Georgetown to Cumberland, Maryland. The system used forty-eight Edison Universal Telephones stationed at intervals along the canal, and was considered a pioneering achievement, the world's first long distance telephone service. It is unknown if any remains of the system still exist.

=== Culverts ===
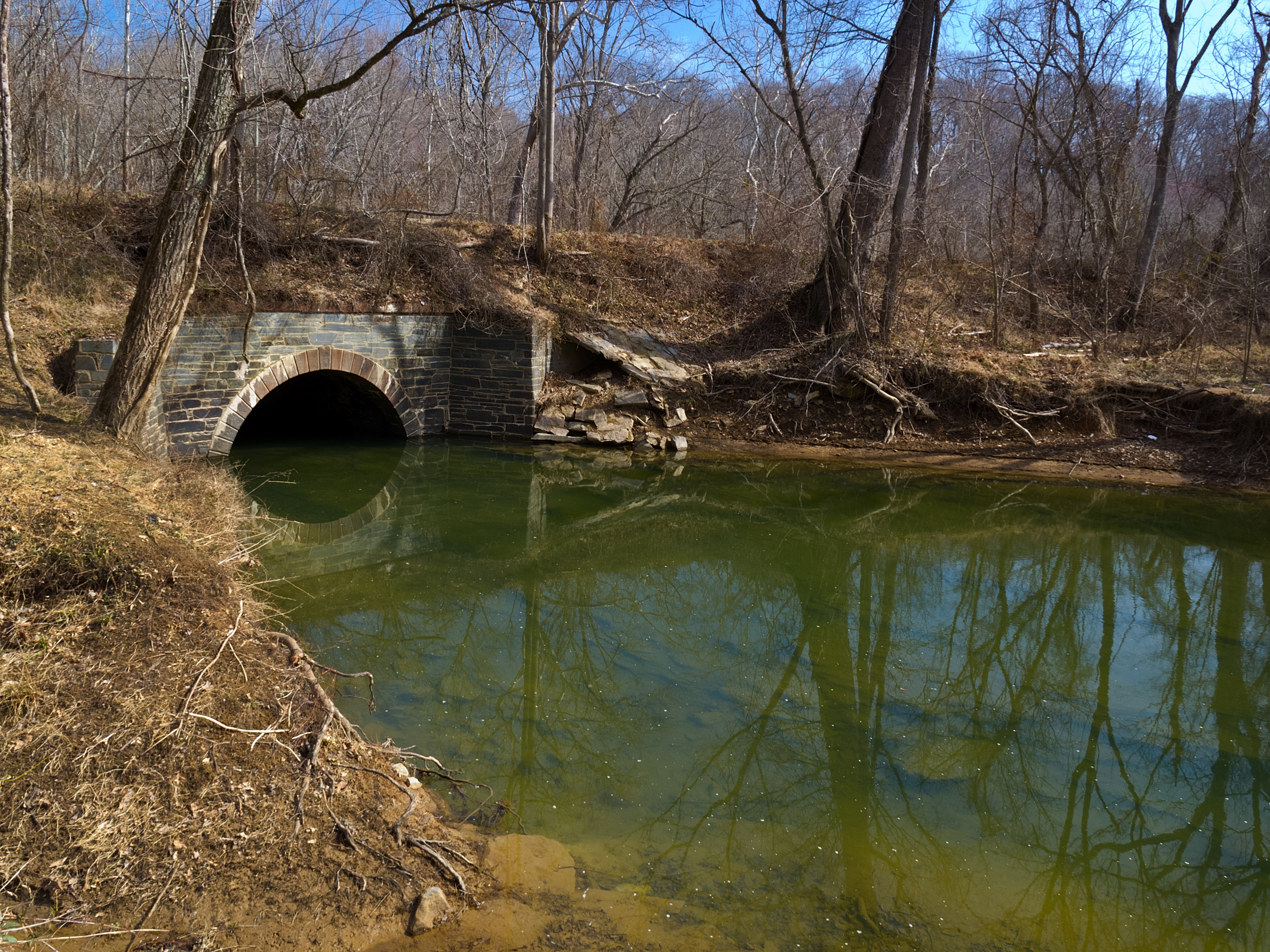
Culvert #30 lets Muddy Branch under the canal

To carry small streams under the canal, 182 culverts, usually of masonry, were built. For instance, culvert #30 was built in 1835 to carry Muddy Branch under the canal. Unfortunately culverts are prone to collapse due to tree roots growing into the canal prism; in addition, rubbish from floods plug culverts, causing floods and more damage. Some culverts have disappeared or were abandoned, although they still appear in company records.

=== Aqueducts ===
Eleven aqueducts carried the canal over rivers and large streams that were too large to run through a culvert.

=== Repairs ===
==== Canal repairs ====
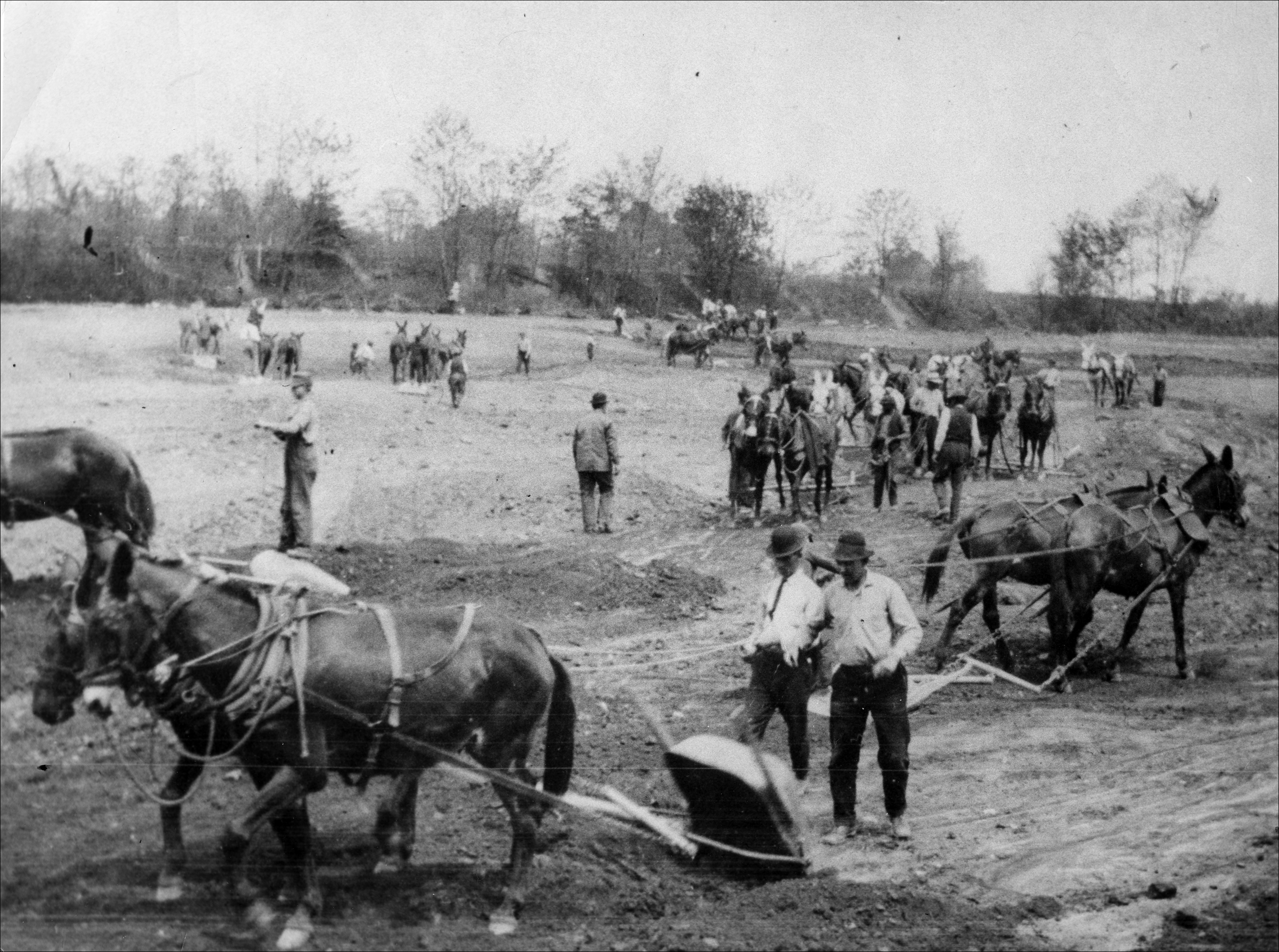
Repairs at Big Pool

The canal hired level walkers to walk the level with a shovel, looking for leaks, and repairing them. Large leaks were reported to the division superintendent, who would send out a crew with a repair scow.

Boatmen said that crabs caused leaks, as did muskrats. The company gave a 25 cent bounty on each muskrat.

==== Emergency repairs ====
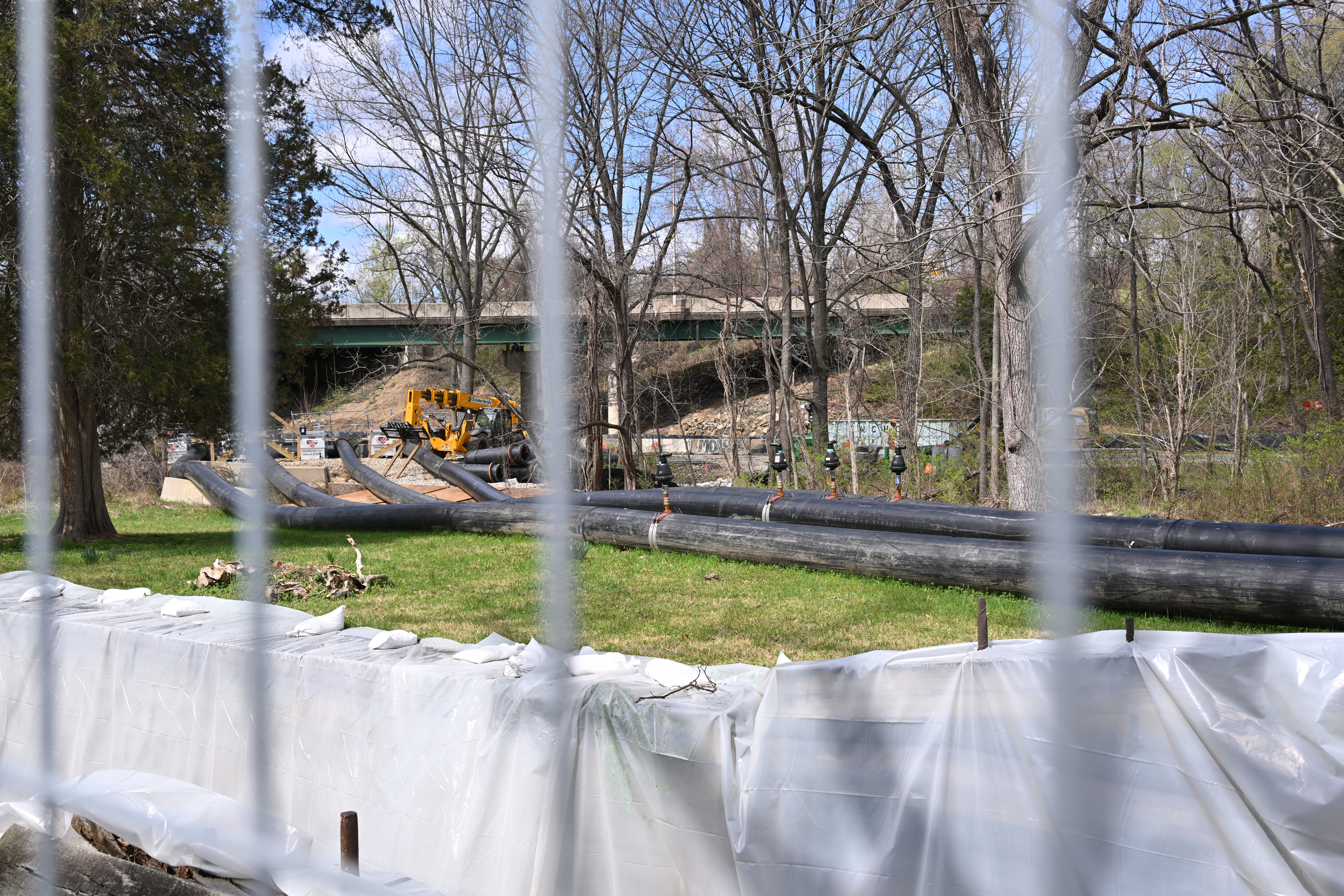
Temporary sewer pipes near Lock 12

On January 19, 2026, the Potomac Interceptor sewer line (PI) ruptured, causing a spill of 300 million gallons into the Potomac River. The District of Columbia Water and Sewer Authority (DC Water) installed a bypass system near Lock 10 using a contained section of the canal to carry wastewater from the interceptor 2,700 feet downstream and back into the sewer system. The system was turned off on March 14 with completion of the emergency repairs to the sewer line.

== Boats on the canal ==
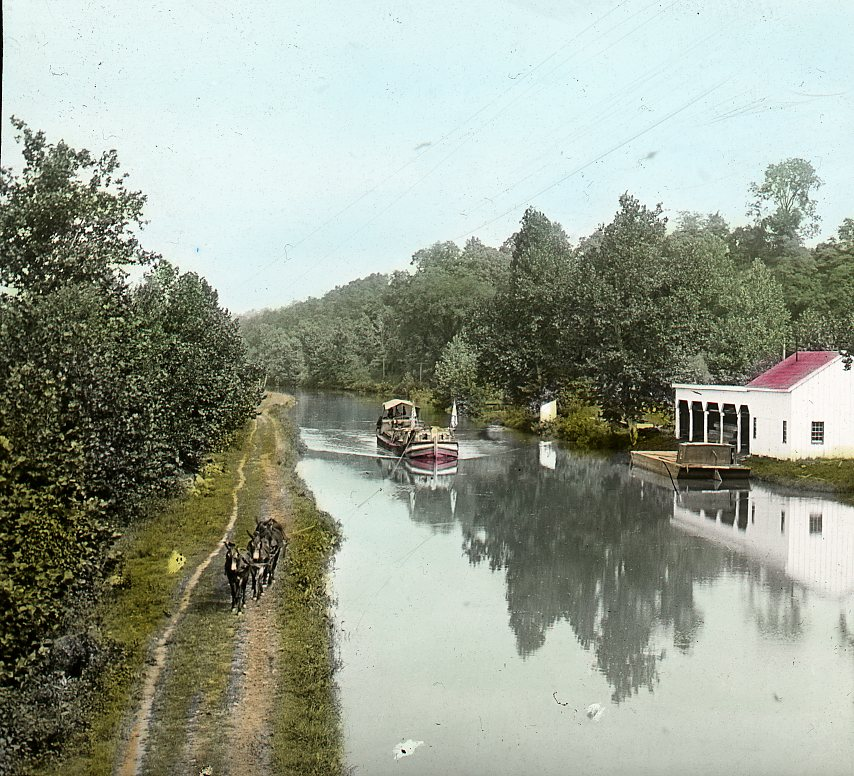
Mules pulling loaded boat. Note the scow moored on the right (berm) side.

At first the board of directors discussed having boats similar to the dimensions on the Erie Canal: 13 1/2 feet (4.1 m) wide with a draft of 3 feet (0.91 m), traveling at 2 1/2 miles per hour (4.0 km/h). Later, Chief Engineer Benjamin Wright submitted a suggestion with the dimensions of the boats being 14 1/2 feet (4.4 m) wide and 90 feet (27 m) long, with a 5-foot (1.5 m) draft, to take advantage of the lock sizes and prism depth. That would permit boats with cargo up to 130 tons. Wright also suggested for passenger boats, having a draft of 10 inches (not including the keel) pulled by 4 horses at 7 miles per hour.

The following classifications of boats originally defined for the canal were as follows:

- Packet Boats, for passengers
- Freight boats
- Scows, especially work scows for construction and maintenance, as well as ice breaking
- Gondolas

Rafts were, from time to time, on the canal, as well as launches and canoes. By 1835 (no doubt due to complaints about drifting rafts) the company put rates unfavorably against rafts. Farmers would build watercraft which were to last only one trip (to transport their wares) and then be sold in Georgetown for firewood.

Classifications were to change. In 1851, after the opening of the canal to Cumberland, the company adopted new classes of boats: A, B, C, D, E, and F, depending on dimensions and tonnage as follows:

Class	Description	# of boats in 1851
A	Decked boats of substantial build, carrying one hundred tons and upwards	9
B	Boats of similar construction, carrying less than one hundred tons	49
C	Boats not decked, of substantial build, carrying one hundred tons and up-wards	108
D	Boats of similar construction, carrying less than one hundred tons	41
E	Long boats and scows, decked or not decked, of substantial build	10
F	Gondolas and other floats designed for temporary use	6
Packets	Boats used chiefly for the transportation of passengers	1

Later years of Canal trade showed a predominance of coal carrying boats. In 1875, the register lists 283 boats owned by coal companies, and of the 108 other boats, 8 were listed as grain carrying, 1 brick, and 1 limestone carrying boat, with the other 91 being general.

During the declining years, freight boats were generally made in Cumberland. Freight boats in those years had two hulls, with 4 inches between them. There were holes (covered, when not in use) that one could put a pump in to pump out the bilge.

=== Double boats ===
In 1875, the Canal Company announced its intention to double the lengths of the locks to allow double boats to pass through the canal, i.e. two boats, one behind the other, which could be towed, reducing freight costs by 50%. The Maryland Coal Company experimented with such boats, but the floods in the late 1870s destroyed these dreams. The first lock to be extended to allow double boats was Edwards Ferry (Lock 25). Locks 25–32 were extended as such, as well as others, for a total of 14 extended locks on the canal.

=== Traffic regulations ===
Boats were to keep to the right. Certain craft had preference over others: "boats had the right of way over rafts, descending boats over ascending craft, packets over freight boats at all times, and packets carrying the mail over all others", and later, repair boats actively involved in repair had preference over everybody else. The boat which did not have preference would slow down the mule team, the rope would sink to the bottom of the canal, and the other boat would float over it, and the mules would walk over also. The towline of the one boat would be unhitched so the lines would not tangle, but sometimes they did. There is one report of a towline snagging on the other boat, and the boatman running the boat into the towpath so as not to drag the other mules into the canal.

It was forbidden to moor boats, rafts, or anything on the towpath side of the canal (which would, of course, impede any traffic at night). For that reason, boats would tie up on the berm side for the night.

Due to problems, on April 1, 1851, the company printed a 47-page booklet with new traffic regulations on the canal, detailing every aspect of operation, as well as fines for violations, and were printed in great numbers and distributed to boatmen and company officials.

The typical boating season ran from April until late November or December when the canal froze over. There were some occasions, for instance, during the Civil War, where the company tried to keep the canal open all year round.

=== Boat repairs ===
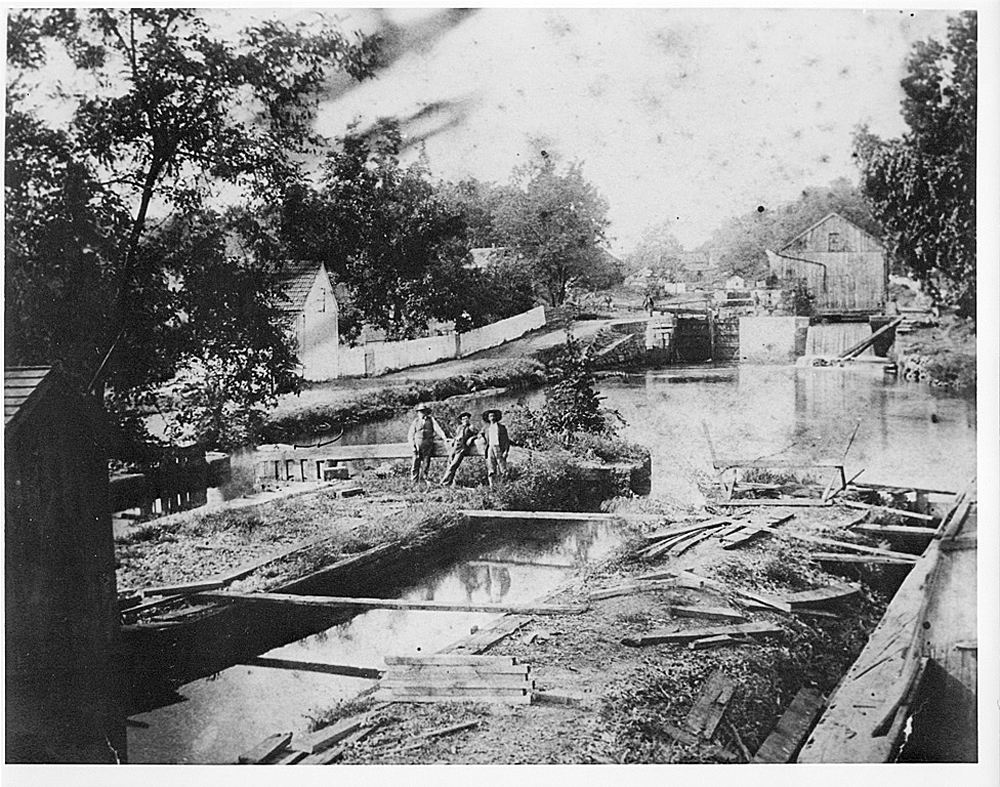
Drydock for repairing boats at Lock 47 (Four Locks).

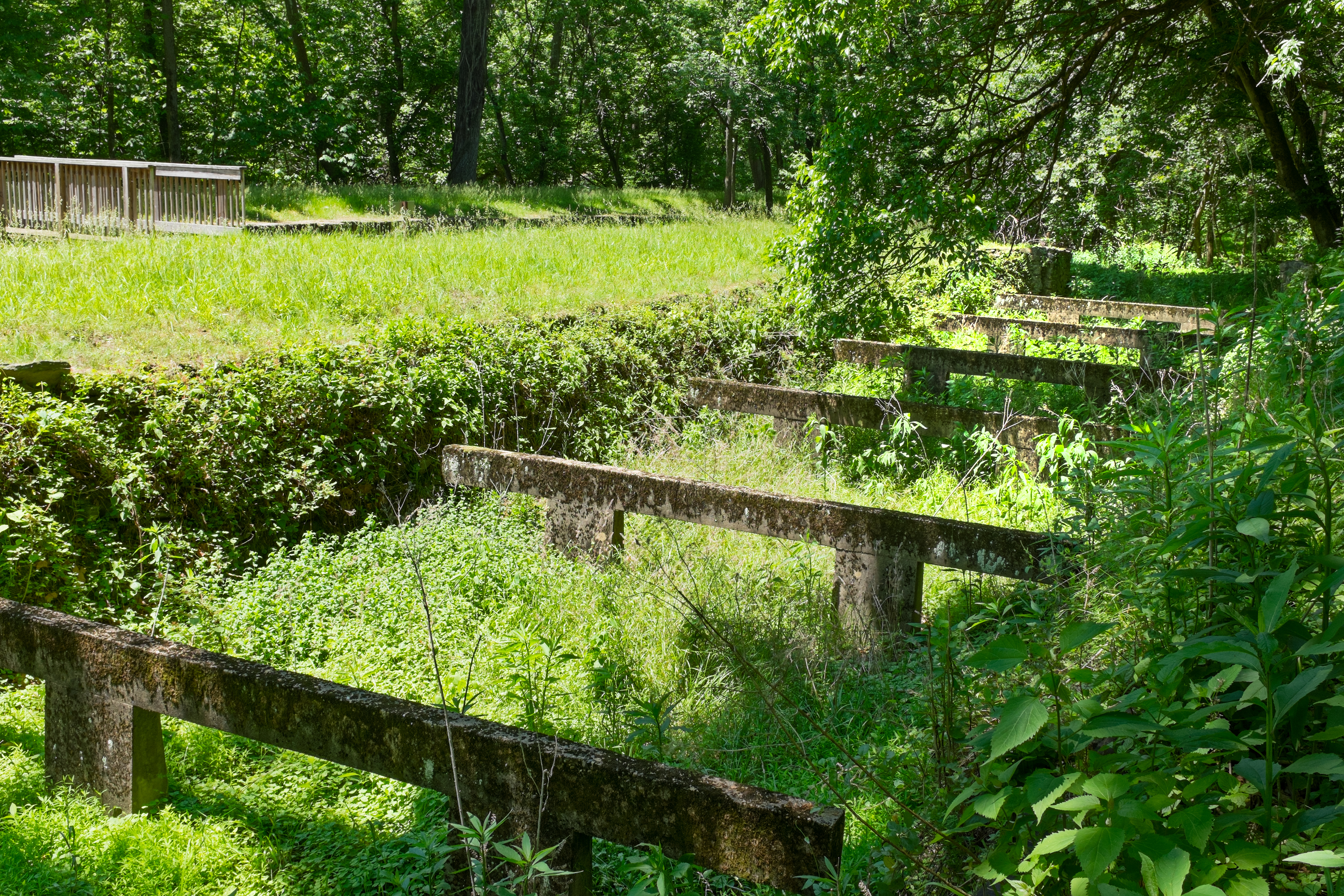
Abandoned drydock at Lock 35 (today). Note the concrete beams that the boat would rest upon.

Boats carried oakum and chisels to patch leaks. There were also boat repair areas, for instance, beside Lock 35 and at Lock 47 (Four Locks), to repair boats. The boat would settle on raised beams (at lock 35, they were made of concrete), as the drydock was drained, and the men could make the necessary repairs, using tin and tar. Originally, the canal plans did not have provisions for drydocks or repairs of boats, but by 1838 there were frequent complaints about drifting rafts and wrecks obstructing navigation. The company made provisions for drydocks to help the situation. In the mid-1800s the Canal Company authorized at least 6 drydocks, documented at the following locations: Locks 45–46, Lock 47 (Four Locks), Lock 44 (Shepherdstown), above Lock 14 (near Carderock), Edwards Ferry (Lock 25), and in the rear of Lock 10 (Seven Locks).

=== Icebreakers ===
Icebreakers were used on the canal, for instance, at the end of the boating season when winter froze the canal, so that the last group of boats could go home. The icebreaker was typically a company scow filled with pig iron. Mules would pull the boat onto the ice, and the weight would break the ice. During the Civil war, the canal company attempted to keep the canal open during the winters of 1861–1862, despite the fact that winters were usually for repairs. Icebreaker boats were used to keep the channel free of ice, so that the military could move supplies.

=== Mules ===
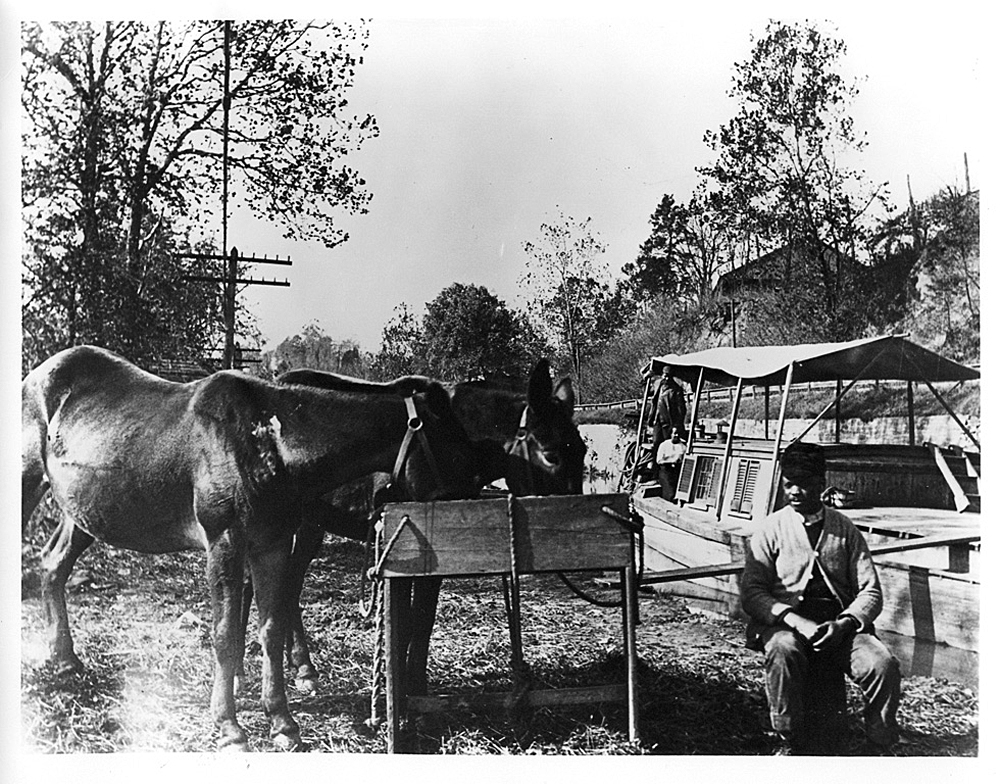
Mules being fed.

Most boats were drawn by mules. Mules lasted about 15 years. Mules were often changed at locks, over gangplanks. Some boatmen would change teams by making the mules swim to the shore to change teams, leading to mules drowning as a result. Mules were bought, at 2 1/2 years, often from Kentucky, and were broken in by having them drag logs. The command to stop mules was not "whoa" but "ye–yip–ye".

Getting a fully loaded boat moving was not easy for the mules, and overdriving them, especially at the basin in Cumberland where there was no water current to help them move the boat, was common, resulting in many spavined mules. To get a loaded boat going, the mules would have to walk until the line was taut, then put their weight into it, and step once the boat had moved, and repeat this process. Within 25 feet, the boat would be moving.

Mules were shod every other trip in Cumberland, although sometimes they had to be shod every trip. Mules were harnessed, one behind the other, slantwise, which (for some reason) pulled the boat straighter, than if they were abreast.

"Drivers" were the people (often children) who drove the mules on the towpaths: on the C&O they were not called "muleskinners" nor "hoggees" (the latter term was used on the Erie Canal)

Dogs were useful to a boat captain on the canal to drive mules and also to swim to take the towline to hitch the mules. Joe Sandblower had a dog which would hunt muskrats along the canal, and he would sell the pelts and collect the bounty on muskrats. There is a documented cat on the canal boat, as well as a raccoon.

=== Horses ===
Horses were occasionally used to pull boats, but they did not last as long as mules. In the 1900s, a large white horse was used in Cumberland basin like a switching engine, to pull coal cars so that the coal could be loaded into the canal boats.

=== Steamboats on the canal ===
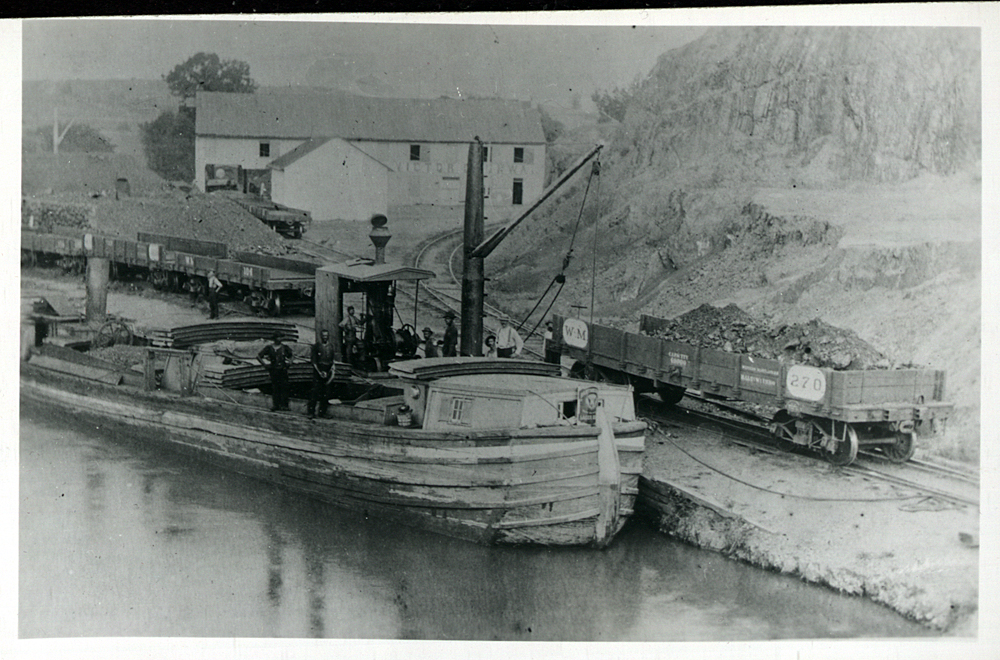
A steamboat on the C&O Canal. Note the steering wheel and the smokestack on this boat

There were occasionally steam boats, one being authorized in 1824. In 1850, the N S Denny company operated some steam driven tugboats on the Canal. The board of directors discussed having steamboats for Big Slackwater, but that was abandoned in favor of a towpath along the side. Records indicate that in the 1879, a single steamboat could go 3 1/4 miles per hour (5.2 km/h) loaded downstream, 4 1/2 miles per hour (7.2 km/h) unloaded going upstream, and took 5 to 7 minutes to lock through whether going upstream or downstream (respectively) and used about a ton of coal per day for operation.

=== Boatmen and boat families ===
The boatmen (usually with their families) were a rough independent lot, forming a class within themselves, and intermarrying within their own group. They frequently fought amongst each other for any reason, be it racial slurs (real or perceived), precedence at a lock, or for exercise. They fought with lockkeepers over company rules, or even with the company for changes in toll rates. During winter when the boats were tied up, they often lived in their own communities away from others. One boat captain observed that on the canal, women and children were as good as the men, and if it weren't for the children, the canal wouldn't run one day.

On April 2, 1831, Daniel Van Slyke reported:

it is with great difficulty we have been able to preserve order among the boatmen, who in striving to push forward for a preference in passing the several locks are sometimes dis-posed to injure each other's boats as a means of carrying their point. An unfortunate in-stance of this kind happened on Wednesday last at the locks on the 9th section. A strongly constructed boat ran her bow against a gondola loaded with flour, and so much injured her as to render it necessary to transship the load. But no damage was done to the cargo.

One notorious incident occurred in May 1874 when George Reed of the Mayfield and Heison was fined $20 for mooring his boat illegally in the Cumberland Basin. He refused to pay the fine. At Lock 74, he forced his way past the lockkeepers who tried to prevent him from continuing, and he was given an additional fine of $50. He continued (without paying), forced his way through the locks at Harpers Ferry and Lock 5, until Georgetown, where he was served notice for $120 in fees plus $4.08 for the waybill. When he got back to Cumberland, his boat was confiscated until he paid the whole $124.08.

Recklessness among the boatmen was common. Many accidents were due to excessive speed. Aqueduct #3 (Catoctin) had a sharp bend at the upstream end, had been the site of a number of collisions from boatmen going too fast. In July 1855, a freight boat collided with a packet boat which sank. One of the most frequent problems was careless boatmen in their rush to lock through, hitting lock gates.

Many of the men, particularly boat captains, said they knew nothing else [except boating]. One woman said, "The children are brought up on the boat and don't know nothin' else, and that is the only reason they take up 'boating'. Boys work for their fathers until they are big enough to get a boat of their own, and it's always easy to get a boat."

==== Hours and wages ====
Fifteen hours a day was the minimum, 18 hours were the most frequently reported, according to the U.S. Department of Labor. Boatman said, "It never rains, snows, or blows for a boatman, and a boatman never has no Sundays." and, "We don't know it's Sunday, till we see some folks along the way, dressed up and a-gin' to Sunday School."

Captains were paid per trip, receiving $70 to $80 per trip in the 1920s, and receiving less than $1,250 per year. Deck hands were paid $12 to $20 per trip, sometimes receiving clothes in lieu of wages or for part of their wages.

The boating season ran from approximately March until December, with the canal drained during winter months to prevent damage from ice and also for repairs.

==== Women ====
Women attended to household chores, steered boats, and gave birth on the boats, although if possible, a midwife would be secured if they were near a town. After birth, the journey would resume, with the man handling the chores including cooking. Often if the husband died, the widow would continue managing and operating the boat. Women often served as lock tenders also. One mother had 14 children, all born on boats, and never had a physician attending.

==== Children ====
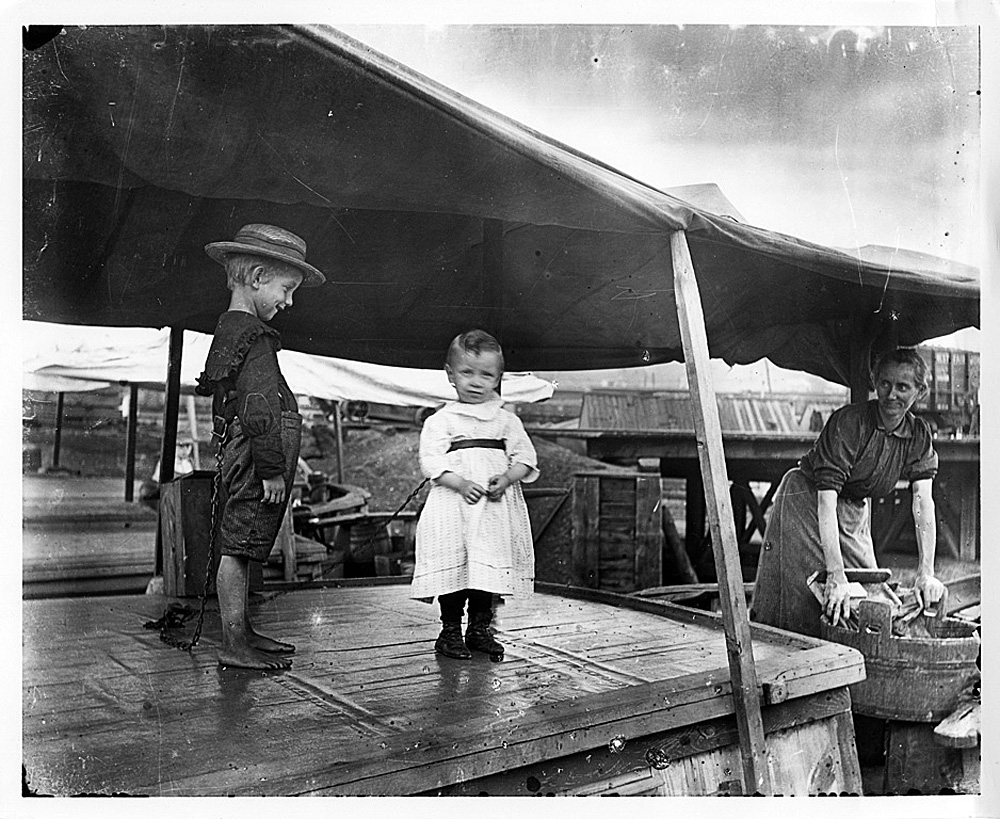
Children tethered to canal boat. This photo was probably taken in one of the Cumberland basins.

The U.S. Department of Labor stated that only the limitations of physical strength prevented the children from performing all operations connected with handling boats. Otho Swain reported he saw a ten-year-old girl put a boat through a lock (i.e. snubbing the boat so it would stop), but that would have been a child who grew up on the canal.

Children generally did the mule driving, except perhaps at night when the captain might do so. In wet weather, the towpath was muddy and slippery and shoes wore out quickly. One man thought himself to be a good father because he provided his boys with rubber boots.

One boatman said, "A boat is a poor place for little children, for all they can do is go in and out of the cabin." His son attended school 94 days out of a possible 178, and the father regretted it, but needed the family to help boat as he could not afford otherwise.

==== Medical care ====
For boat families, there was very little medical care. One father stated, "We never need a doctor. We just stay sick until we get well." It was practically impossible to get a doctor in the mountains at the upper end of the canal or on the long levels.

==== Food ====
Canned food was sometimes brought. Bean soup, made with beans, ham hocks, and an onion, was common. Other items included corn bread, eggs and bacon, ham, potatoes, and other vegetables. A reported canal custom was the first few rows of corn from farms along the canal could be used by the boatmen. Berries along the towpath were also picked. Molasses also was common. Bread and many groceries could be bought along the canal. Muskrats were sometimes eaten, as well as chickens and ducks either bought or even stolen along the way. Rabbits were snared. Crew members sometimes had a shotgun to shoot rabbits, groundhogs, or other game. Turtles were eaten as well as eels that the lock tenders caught in eel pots in the rivers or the bypass flumes. Fish included sunfish, catfish, bigmouth bass, and black bass.

==== Living quarters ====
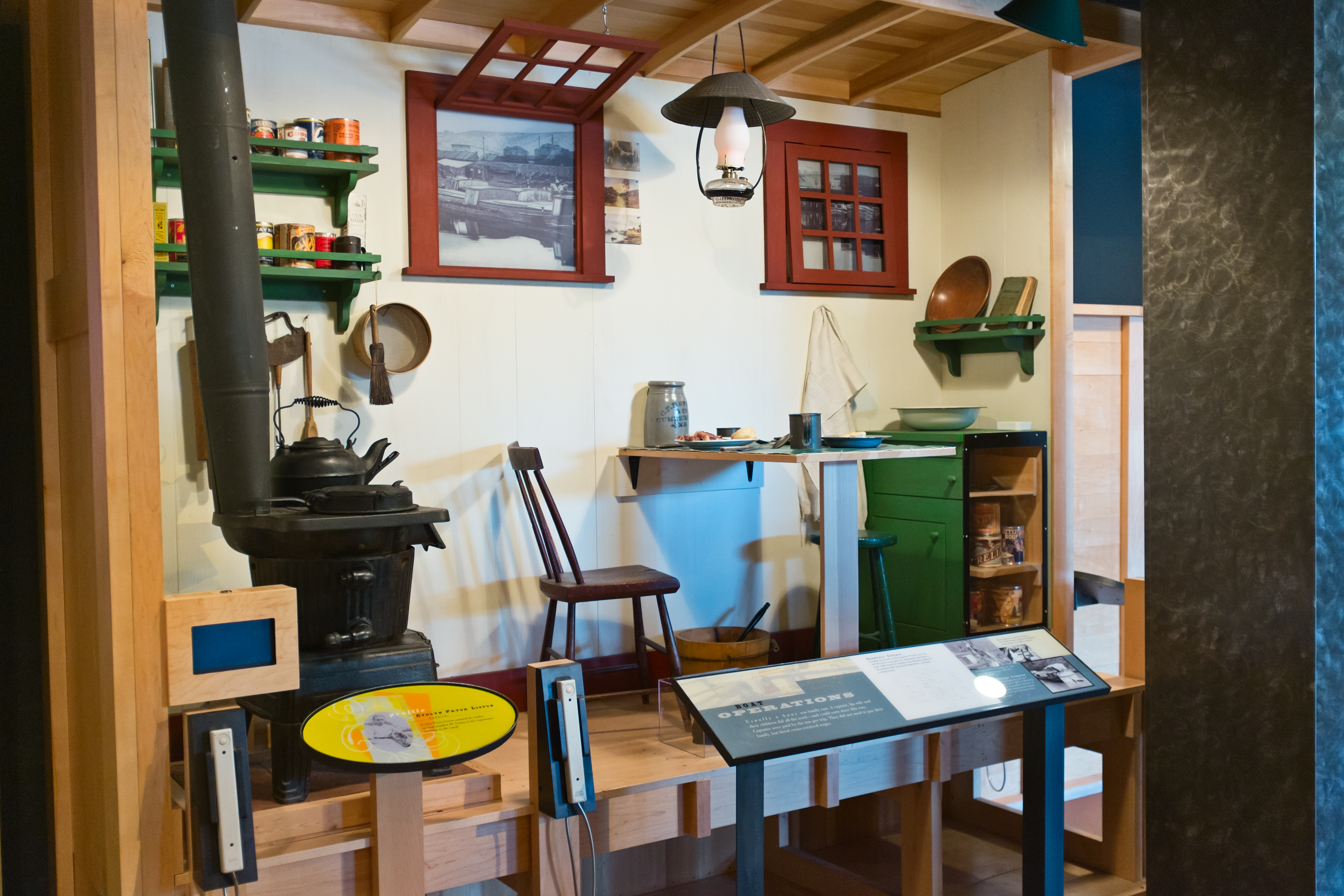
Model interior of a C&O Canal freight boat

Cabins were 10 feet by 12 feet, and housed two bunks, each 36 inches wide, supposedly for one person, but often occupied by two. While most cabin floors were bare, in one survey, 14 had linoleum covering. The cabins were divided between sleeping quarters and the "stateroom" by a diagonal wall. The feed box, 4 feet by 4 feet, in the center boat, often doubled as sleeping quarters with a blanket thrown over the feed. Occasionally the deck was used for sleeping

Cooking was done on a stove, burning corncobs (from the mule feed) or sometimes coal. Washing clothes and children was typically done at night by moonlight, after tying up the boat, along the side of the canal. Food and provisions for the trip (e.g. flour, sugar, coffee, salt pork, smoked meat, etc.) were bought in Cumberland on Wineow street, from stores such as Coulehan's, Dennis Murphy's, or John McGrinnis's. Some boatmen carried chickens or pigs on the boats. Fish caught in the canal also served as food, as well as turtles. Additional supplies could be bought along the way from lockkeepers and at towns.

== Legends and ghosts ==
Many legends have been documented along the canal during its operating days:

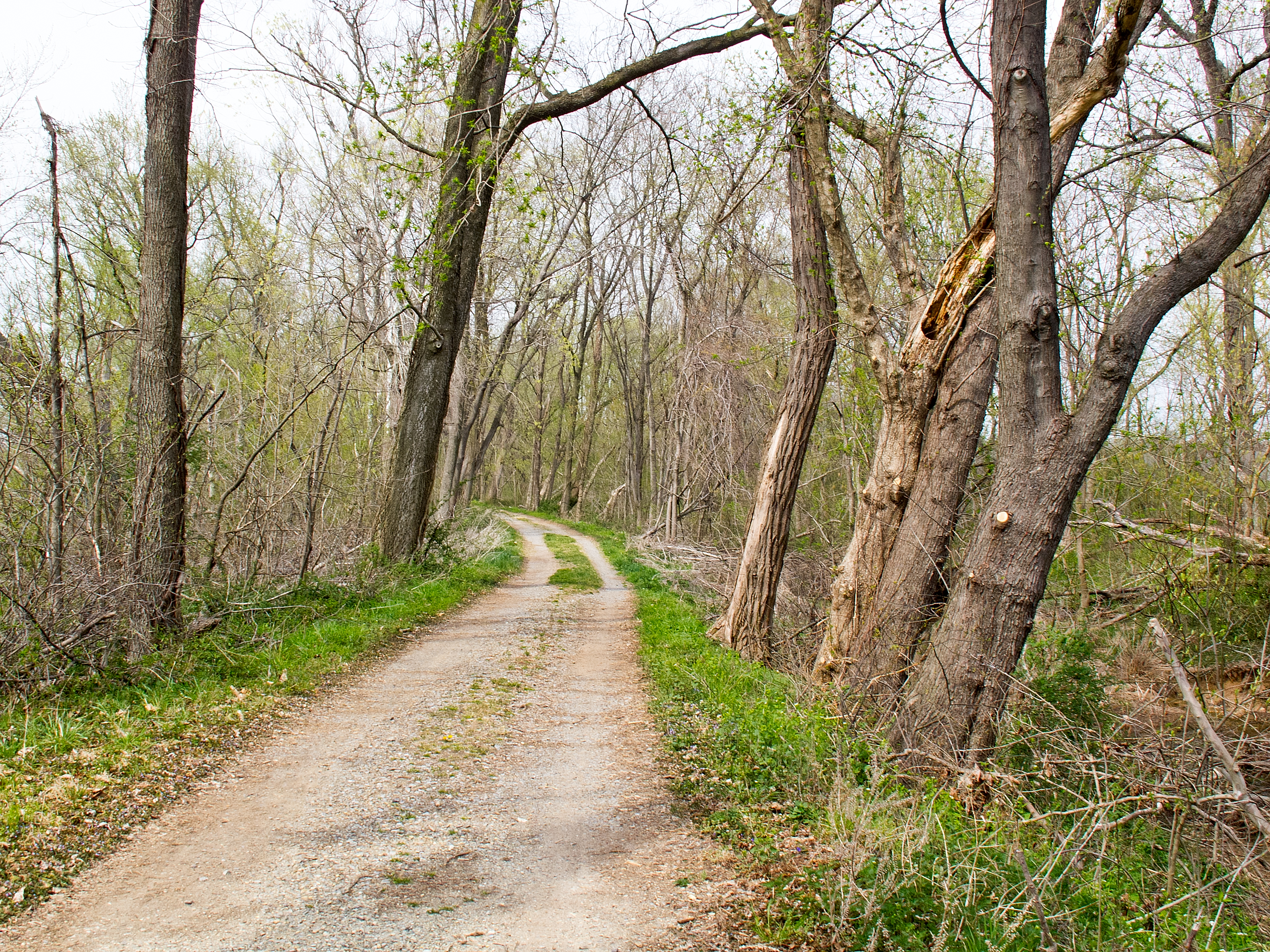
Recent view of the 9 mile level (between 33 and 34 miles) where the ghosts were reported to haunt.

- On the 9 mile level around the 33–34 mile mark, some boats were used to transport soldiers to the Battle of Ball's Bluff during the American Civil War. One of the boats sank, and it was said that departed ghosts of the soldiers haunted the area. Canallers would avoid tying up at night in that area. It was also said that the mules would sense it, and would hurry through the area (it was also called "Haunted House Bend"), and also that there were tales of a ghost dog there.
- There was reported the ghost of an Indian chief on the 14 mile level around Big Pool.
- A lady ghost was reported on the 2 mile level at Catoctin (between locks 28 and 29) which would walk over the waste weir, down the towpath and to the river.
- A headless man was reported to haunt the Paw Paw Tunnel.
- A Romeo and Juliet like-story was documented near Lock 69 (Twigg's lock). (See Locks on the C&O Canal#Lock names for more info).

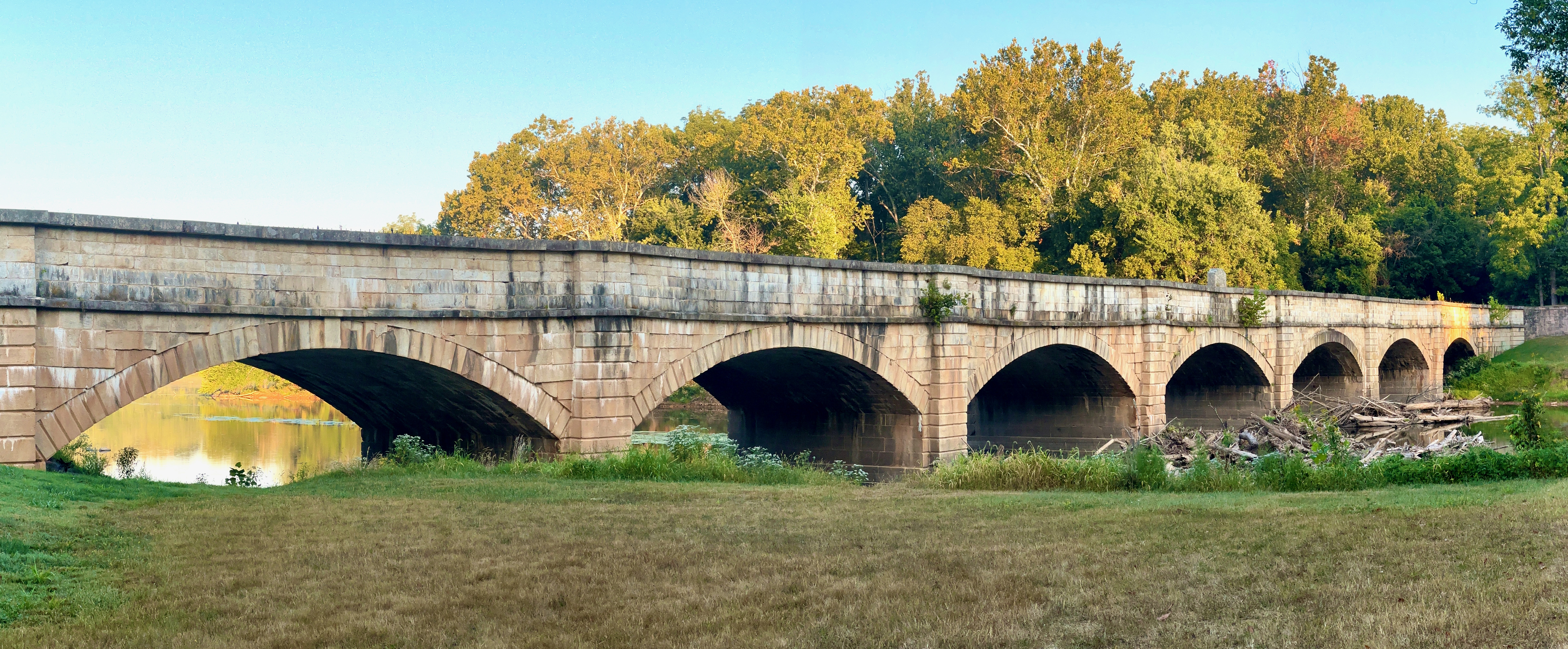
Monocacy Aqueduct in 2023, where the ghost of a robber could allegedly be seen on moonless nights

- A report of "buried treasure" somewhere between Nolands Ferry and the Monocacy river, that could be found if one followed a ghost of a robber, allegedly seen from time to time on moonless nights crossing the Monocacy Aqueduct carrying a lantern.

== Points of interest ==
Here is a list of items on the canal, as a canaller traveling by boat from Georgetown to Cumberland would see. (Note: some present day items are on this list also.) A typical canaller would know the canal by the names of the levels and the locks. Most list of points of the canal's points of interest do not contain a list of the levels with their names like we have here. Also note that most lists of locks do not include Guard Locks 4 and 5, which a boat would have to pass through, if navigating the entire canal (It was generally possible for boats to pass through the other guard locks also, but that is if they were going to other destinations, usually on the Virginia/West Virginia side of the river). Also note sometimes there are often slight discrepancies in mileages, for instance NPS and Hahn reports Lock 75 at 175.60 miles, Davies lists "175.35 (175.50)", and Hahn also reports the NPS mile markers are in the wrong place from Milepost 117 to Lock 51, further adding to the confusion. Also note that Some streets in Georgetown were renamed, mostly as numbered streets, pursuant to an 1895 law. See Georgetown street renaming.

	Locks and Features		
Lock or Level	Mile	Features	Location
Tidewater Lock	0	Beginning of Canal Watergate complex	
Rock Creek Level	.02	Rock Creek	
Lock 1	0.38		
Short Level	0.42	Green St Bridge (29th St NW)	
Lock 2	0.42		
Short Level
Lock 3	0.49	Washington Street Bridge (30th St NW)	
Short Level
Lock 4	0.54	Jefferson St Bridge (Thomas Jefferson Street NW)	
4 Mile Level of Georgetown	0.59 / Congress St Bridge (31st St NW); 0.68 / High St Bridge (Wisconsin Avenue NW); 0.61 / Water intake (blocked off) for mill.; 0.80 / Potomac Street Bridge; 0.81 / Water intake (abandoned) for Wilkens Rogers Mill; 0.84 / Market St Bridge (33rd St NW); 0.84 / Frederick St Bridge (34th St NW); 0.91 / Another water intake (abandoned) Wilkens Rogers Flour Mill.; 1.0 / Key Bridge; 1.07 / Abutment of former Aqueduct Bridge to Alexandria; 1.51 / Spillway; 1.52 / Waste weir (1st and 2nd on this level); 2.26 / Inclined plane; 3.1 / Fletcher's Boat House; 3.23 / Waste weir (3rd); 3.64 / Arizona Avenue Railway Bridge (Capital Crescent Trail); 3.9 / Spillway (2nd); 4.2 / Chain Bridge; 4.54 / Dalecarlia Water Treatment plant discharge pipe (runs under the canal, to the Potomac R.)		
Lock 5 (Brookmont)	5.02	Inlet gate #1 (lower)	
Short Level	5.20	Service road to Upper Inlet Gate	
Lock 6 (Magazine Lock)	5.4		
Two mile level of Magazine	5.64 / Groundbreaking started here. Also Dam No. 1; 5.78 / Little Falls diversion dam & pumping station (Washington Aqueduct); 6.08 / Overfall (overflow); 6.46 / Sycamore Island Bridge		
Lock 7	7.0		
One mile level of Cabin John	7.10 / Waste weir		
Lock 8 (1st of 7 locks)	8.33		
Lock 9 (7 Locks)	8.7		
Lock 10 (7 Locks)	8.79		
Short Level	8.93 / Rock Run culvert (Rock Run was a feeder)		
Lock 11 (7 Locks)	8.97		
Lock 12 (7 Locks)	9.29		
Lock 13 (7 Locks)	9.37	American Legion Bridge	
Lock 14 (Last of 7 Locks)	9.47		
Four mile level of the Log Wall	9.67 / Waste weir; 9.9 / Abutment of swivel bridge; 9.9 / Billy Goat "C" Trail downstream entrance; 10.41 / Carderock; 10.76 / Informal overflow; 10.95 / Billy Goat "C" Trail upstream entrance; 11.44 / Billy Goat "B" Trail downstream entrance; 11.52 / Marsden Tract Campground; 12.1 / Billy Goat "B" Trail upstream entrance; 12.28 / Anglers Inn; 12.60 / Wide Water begins (till Lock 15); 12.8 / Billy Goat A Trail downstream entrance; 13.00 / Bridge and waste weir; 13.2 / Billy Goat "A" Trail–Emergency exit trail		
Lock 15 (1st of 6 Locks)	13.45	End of Wide Water	
Lock 16 (6 Locks)	13.60		
Short Level	13.75 / Stop gate; 13.76 / Billy Goat "A" Trail Upstream Entrance		
Lock 17 (6 Locks)	13.99		
Short Level	14.05	Trail to Great Falls	
Lock 18 (6 Locks)	14.09		
Short Level	14.10 / Impound dam for (Unused) Great Falls feeder		
Lock 19 (6 Locks)	14.17		
Lock 20 (Last of 6 Locks)	14.30	Great Falls Tavern	
Two mile level of Six Locks	14.34 / Waste weir; 15.76 / Informal overflow; 15.98 / Rockville water plant intake		
Lock 21 (Swain's Lock)	16.64		
Three mile level of White Oak Spring	16.67 / Waste weir; 16.74 / Informal overflow; 17.36 / WSSC water plant intake; 17.60 / Transcontinental Gas Pipeline; 17.74 / Culvert #25 Watts Branch; 17.78 / Columbia Gas Pipeline		
Lock 22 Pennyfield Lock	19.63		
2 Mile Level	19.67 / Waste weir; 20.01 / Muddy Branch (Culvert #30)		
Lock 23 Violette's Lock	22.12	Inlet Lock #2 (Seneca Feeder)	
Short Level of Seneca	22.4	Waste weir	
Lock 24 Riley's Lock	22.80	Seneca Aqueduct (No.1) & waste weir	
Eight mile level of Riley's Lock	24.94 / Informal Overflow, 100' long; 26.0 / Horsepen Branch Hiker Biker campsite; 27.2 / Sycamore Landing; 30.5 / Chisel Branch Hiker Biker; 30.64 / Goose Creek River Locks		
Lock 25 Edward's Ferry	30.8		
Nine mile level of Whites Ferry	30.89 / Waste weir; 31.94 / Broad Run Trunk (Aqueduct); 34.4 / Turtle Run Hiker Biker Campsite; 35.49 / White's Ferry; 38.2 / Marble Quarry Hiker Biker Campsite; 39.17 / Waste weir		
Lock 26 (Wood's Lock)	39.37		
Two Mile level	39.49 / Abandoned waste weir; 39.6 / Dickerson Regional Park parking lot		
Lock 27 (Spink's Ferry)	41.5		
Seven mile level of Point of Rocks	41.52 / Waste weir; 42.19 / Monocacy Aqueduct; 42.40 / Indian Flats Hiker Biker overnight camp; 44.58 / Nolands Ferry; 44.76 / Frederick County water plant intake; 47.79 / Point of Rocks Station (on other side); 48.20 / Point of Rocks pivot bridge; 48.40 / Point of Rocks Railroad Tunnel(CSX Transportation); 48.90 / Waste weir		
Lock 28 (Fulton's Lock)	48.93		
2 Mile Level	48.96 / Waste weir		
Lock 29 (Lander or Catoctin)	50.89		
Four mile level of Brunswick	51.05 / Waste Weir; 51.53 / Catoctin Aqueduct (No 3); 53.21 / Informal overflow; 53.51 / Brunswick, Maryland begins; 54.95 / Waste weir		
Lock 30 (Brunswick)	55.0		
Three Mile Level of Weverton	57.87 / Ruins of Weverton		
Lock 31 (Weverton)	58.0		
Two mile Level of Sandy Hook	58.06 / Waste weir; 58.08 / Informal overflow; 59.44 / Closed Blue Ridge Hiker Biker campsite; 59.6 / Sandy Hook		
Lock 32	60.23		
Short Level	60.62 / Shenandoah River Lock		
Lock 33 (Harpers Ferry)	60.7	Harpers Ferry	
Goodheart Level
Lock 34 (Goodheart's Lock)	61.57		
Feeder Level	62.27 / Dam No. 3; 62.27 / Inlet Lock #3		
Lock 35	62.33	Drydock for boat repairs	
Short level
Lock 36	62.44		
Four mile level below Mountain Lock	62.59 / Waste weir; 64.89 / Dargan Bend boat launch		
Lock 37 (Mountain Lock)	66.96		
Six mile level below Shepherdstown	67.02 / Informal overflow; 67.15 / Waste weir; 69.40 / Antietam Creek Aqueduct (No. 4); 72.65 / Shepherdstown river lock		
Lock 38 (Shepherdstown lock)	72.80		
One mile level above Shepherdstown	72.86 / Informal overflow		
Lock 39 (One Mile Lock)	74.0		
Five Mile Level of Sharpsburg	74.07 / Waste weir; 76.69 / Informal overflow		
Lock 40	79.41		
Six mile level of Taylor's Landing	79.65 / Waste weir; 80.95 / Taylor's Landing & Mercerville; 84.35 / Waste weir; 84.40 / Dam No. 4; 84.41 / Stop gate		
Guard Lock No. 4	85.4		
Big Slackwater	88.0 / Stanley L. Anderson stone building (Ruin); 88.1 / McMahon's Mill		
Lock 41	88.9	Reenter canal from Big Slackwater	
Short level
Lock 42	89.04		
Four mile level of Big Slackwater	89.63 / Dellinger Widewater; 91.24 / End of Dellinger Widewater; 92.25 / Midpoint of Canal; 92.73 / Waste weir		
Lock 43	92.96		
Six mile level below Williamsport	98.90	Waste weir	
Lock 44	99.3	Williamsport	
Seven mile level above Williamsport	99.65 / Salisbury St. Bridge; 99.69 / Railroad lift bridge (Western Maryland Railway); 99.80 / Conococheague Creek Aqueduct (No. 5); 106.61 / Waste weir		
Guard Lock #5	106.8	Dam No. 5	
Little Slackwater
Lock 45 (Two Locks)	107.27	Two Locks (Reenter above Little Slackwater)	
Short Level
Lock 46 (Two Locks)	107.42		
Two mile level of Four Locks	107.62 / Overflow (semi-formal); 108.10 / Charles Mill Ruins		
Lock 47 (Four Locks)	108.8		
Short Level
Lock 48 (Four Locks)	108.8		
Short Level
Lock 49 (Four Locks)	108.8		
Short Level
Lock 50 (Four Locks)	108.8		
Fourteen Mile Level	109.32 / Waste weir; 109.54 / North Mountain Hiker Biker campsite; 110.29 / Stop gate; 112.4 / Fort Frederick State Park & Stop Gate; 112.5 / Big Pool Begins; 113.02 / Waste weir and spillway; 113.94 / Big Pool Ends; 114.15 / Stop gate; 116.04 / Licking Creek Aqueduct (No. 6); 118.46 / Waste weir & Culvert 166; 119.84 / Little Pool, lower end; 119.51 / Waste weir & Culvert 170; 119.71 / Stop gate; 119.91 / Informal overflow; 120.39 / Little Pool Hiker Biker campsite; 120.56 / Abandoned waste weir/overflow; 120.75 / Little Pool, Upper end; 122.25 / Waste weir & Culvert 174		
Lock 51	122.59		
Short Level
Lock 52	122.85		
Seven mile level of Hancock	122.92 / Tonoloway Creek Aqueduct (No. 7) & waste weir; 123.56 / Hancock, Maryland begins; 124.38 / Hancock, Maryland ends; 126.43 / White Rock Hiker Biker campsite; 126.84 / Waste weir & Culvert 186; 127.00 / Site of waste weir and overflow; 127.4 / Round Top Cement Mill ruins; 128.0 / Pump remains for Sand Glass; 129.87 / Waste weir		
Lock 53 Irishman's Lock	130.0		
Four Mile Level below Dam No. 6	130.8 / Leopard's Mill (Cement mill); 130.93 / Informal overflow; 132.40 / Informal overflow; 133.17 / Waste weir; 133.94 / Feeder canal from Dam No. 6		
Lock 54	133.96		
Short Level
Lock 55	134.08		
Two mile level above Dam No. 6 aka Two Mile Level of Pearre	134.06 / Dam No 6. and Guard lock No 6.; 134.25 / Waste weir & spillway		
Lock 56 (Sideling Lock)	136.2	Sideling Hill	
Three Mile Level of Sideling Hill	136.56	Sideling Hill Creek Aqueduct (No 8) & waste weir	
Lock 57	139.2		
Five Mile Level below Orleans	140.8 / Little Orleans; 140.90 / Fifteen Mile Creek Aqueduct (No. 9) & waste weir; 142.04 / Informal overflow		
Lock 58	143.9		
Two mile level of Bill Bell's [Lock]	146.02 / Waste weir		
Lock 59	146.6		
Three mile level of the brick house	149.45	Waste weir	
Lock 60	149.7		
Four mile level below the tunnel	153.01	Waste weir	
Lock 61	153.1		
One Mile level below the tunnel
Lock 62	154.17		
Short Level	154.29	Waste weir	
Lock 63 1/3	154.49		
Short Level
Lock 64 2/3	154.6		
Short Level
Lock 66	154.7		
Seven Mile Level above the Tunnel	155.20 / Downstream portal of Paw Paw Tunnel; 155.78 / Upstream portal of Paw Paw Tunnel; 156.2 / Division Superintendent's house; 156.65 / Spillway and overflow; 156.66 / Waste weir; 160.26 / Waste weir & spillways		
Lock 67 Darbey's Lock	161.77		
Three mile level of South Branch	162.34 / Town Creek Aqueduct (No. 10); 162.40 / Abandoned waste weir; 162.41 / Waste weir & culvert; 164.79 / South Branch of Potomac River		
Lock 68 Crabtree's Lock	164.8		
Two Mile level of Old Town	164.85 / Abandoned overflow (waste weir); 165.3 / Basin; 166.24 / Waste weir		
Lock 69 Twigg's Lock	166.45		
Short Level
Lock 70 Oldtown	166.7		
Short Level
Lock 71	167.06		
Eight Mile level of Old Town	167.11 / Waste weir; 167.5 / Deep cut; 171.45 / Spillway; 173.6 / Patterson's Creek bridge; 174.10 / Steam pump (aux water); 174.32 / Waste weir		
Lock 72 The Narrows or 10 Mile Lock	174.46		
One mile level of the Narrows	175.30	Head of the Narrows	
Lock 73 North Branch 1	175.4		
Lock 74 North Branch 2	175.5		
Short level	175.58	Waste weir	
Lock 75 North Branch 3 or Keifer's Lock	175.6		
Nine mile level	179.35 / Waste weir and Culvert #237; 180.66 / Evitts Creek Aqueduct (# 11); 183.39 / Stop gate and waste weir; 183.55 / Spillway and waste weir; 184 / Cumberland, Maryland Basin; 184 / Canal Place		
Guard Lock No. 8	184.5	End of Canal	

== General and cited references ==
- Camagna, Dorothy (2006). The C&O Canal: From Great National Project to National Historical Park. Gaithersburg, Maryland: Belshore Publications. ISBN 0-9770449-0-4.
- Davies, William E. (1999). The Geology and Engineering Structures of the Chesapeake and Ohio Canal: An Engineering Geologist's Descriptions and Drawings (PDF). Glen Echo, Md.: C&O Canal Association. Archived (PDF) from the original on 2014-07-25.
- Hahn, Thomas F. Swiftwater (1984). The Chesapeake & Ohio Canal: Pathway to the Nation's Capital. Metuchen, New Jersey: The Scarecrow Press, Inc. ISBN 0-8108-1732-2.
- Hahn, Thomas F. Swiftwater (1993). Towpath Guide to the C&O Canal: Georgetown Tidelock to Cumberland, Revised Combined Edition. Shepherdstown, WV: American Canal and Transportation Center. ISBN 0-933788-66-5.
- Hahn, Thomas F. Swiftwater (1980). The C & O Canal Boatmen, 1892–1924. Shepherdstown, WV: American Canal and Transportation Center.
- Kytle, Elizabeth (1983). Home on the Canal. Cabin John, MD: Seven Locks Press. ISBN 978-080185328-9.
- Mackintosh, Barry (1991). C&O Canal: The Making of A Park. Washington, D.C.: National Park Service, Department of the Interior.
- National Park Service (2006-08-08). "C&O Canal Educational Programs: Lessons Page". United States Department of the Interior. Archived from the original on 2008-10-12.
- Unrau, Harland D. "Historical Resource Study: Chesapeake & Ohio Canal" (PDF). [US Department of the Interior, National Park Service]. Archived (PDF) from the original on 2015-07-14. This resource survey has a lot of information unavailable elsewhere on the construction and operation of the canal.
- Butcher, Russell D. (1997). Exploring Our National Historic Parks and Sites. Roberts Rinehart Publishers
- National Park Service. Chesapeake and Ohio Canal National Historical Park. Retrieved 2010-05-11.
