= List of bridges documented by the Historic American Engineering Record in Maryland =

This is a list of bridges documented by the Historic American Engineering Record in the US state of Maryland.

== Bridges ==
Survey No.	Name (as assigned by HAER)	Status	Type	Built	Documented	Carries	Crosses	Location	County	Coordinates
MD-1	Baltimore and Ohio Railroad, Bollman Truss Bridge	Extant	Bollman truss	1835	1984	Baltimore and Ohio Railroad (former)	Little Patuxent River	Savage	Howard	39°08′05″N 76°49′31″W
MD-3	Baltimore and Ohio Railroad, Thomas Viaduct	Extant	Stone arch	1835	1984	CSX Capital Subdivision	Patapsco River	Elkridge	Howard	39°13′18″N 76°42′48″W
MD-5	Cumberland and Pennsylvania Railroad, Wills Creek Bridge	Demolished	Brick arch	1860	1984	Cumberland and Pennsylvania Railroad (former)	Wills Creek	Cumberland	Allegany	39°40′14″N 78°47′25″W
MD-9	Baltimore and Ohio Railroad, Carrollton Viaduct	Extant	Stone arch	1829	1984	CSX Baltimore Terminal Subdivision	Gwynns Falls	Baltimore	Independent city	39°16′32″N 76°39′18″W
MD-12	Baltimore and Ohio Railroad, Patterson Viaduct	Ruin	Stone arch	1829	1970	Baltimore and Ohio Railroad (former)	Patapsco River	Ilchester	Howard	39°14′56″N 76°45′53″W
MD-16	Baltimore and Ohio Railroad, Harpers Ferry Bridge Piers	Ruin		1836	1970	Baltimore and Ohio Railroad (former)	Potomac River	Maryland Heights, Maryland, and Harpers Ferry, West Virginia	Washington County, Maryland, and Jefferson County, West Virginia	39°19′25″N 77°43′38″W
MD-22	Baltimore and Ohio Railroad, Waring Viaduct	Extant	Stone arch	1906	1970	CSX Metropolitan Subdivision	Great Seneca Creek	Gaithersburg	Montgomery	39°09′32″N 77°14′53″W
MD-23	Potomac Edison Company, Chesapeake and Ohio Canal Bridge	Extant	Vertical-lift bridge	1923	1970	Potomac Edison Company siding	Chesapeake and Ohio Canal	Williamsport	Washington	39°35′59″N 77°49′36″W
MD-24	Salisbury Street Bridge	Extant	Pratt truss	1879	1970	Salisbury Street	Chesapeake and Ohio Canal	Williamsport	Washington	39°35′57″N 77°49′35″W
MD-31	Chesapeake and Ohio Canal, Town Creek Aqueduct	Extant	Stone arch	1849	1974	Chesapeake and Ohio Canal	Town Creek	Oldtown	Allegany	39°31′24″N 78°32′39″W
MD-32	Chesapeake and Ohio Canal, Culvert 65	Extant	Stone arch	1832	1974	Chesapeake and Ohio Canal	Unnamed stream	Dickerson	Montgomery	39°11′38″N 77°28′12″W
MD-35	Poffenberger Road Bridge	Extant	Whipple truss	1878	1983	Poffenberger Road	Catoctin Creek	Middletown	Frederick	39°22′54″N 77°34′18″W
MD-36	Old Mill Road Bridge	Extant	Pratt truss	1882	1983	Old Mill Road	Owens Creek	Rocky Ridge	Frederick	39°36′07″N 77°20′19″W
MD-37	Baltimore and Ohio Railroad, Long Bridge	Demolished	Trestle	1869	1983	Baltimore and Ohio Railroad (former)	Antietam Creek	Keedysville	Washington	39°30′15″N 77°42′49″W
MD-40	Keysville-Frederick County Road Bridge	Replaced		1873		Keysville-Frederick County Road	Monocacy River	Keymar	Carroll	39°39′16″N 77°16′01″W
MD-41	National Road, Wilson Bridge	Extant	Stone arch	1819	1982	National Road	Conococheague Creek	Hagerstown	Washington	39°39′27″N 77°50′53″W
MD-44	Post Road Bridge	Replaced	Baltimore truss	1905	1984	MD 7	Northeast Corridor	Havre de Grace	Harford	39°32′11″N 76°06′49″W
MD-46	Susquehanna River Bridge	Extant	Pennsylvania truss	1908	1984	CSX Philadelphia Subdivision	Susquehanna River	Havre de Grace and Perryville	Harford and Cecil	39°34′08″N 76°05′13″W
MD-52	Sharptown Bridge	Replaced	Swing span	1912	1987	MD 313	Nanticoke River	Sharptown	Wicomico	38°32′45″N 75°43′10″W
MD-53	Cabin John Aqueduct Bridge	Extant	Stone arch	1863	1987	MacArthur Boulevard and Washington Aqueduct	Cabin John Creek	Cabin John	Montgomery	38°58′22″N 77°08′53″W
MD-68	Matthews Bridge	Replaced	Pennsylvania truss	1914	1978	MD 146 (Dulaney Valley Road)	Loch Raven Reservoir	Baltimore	Baltimore	39°27′46″N 76°34′50″W
MD-69	Chesapeake and Ohio Canal, White's Ferry Iron Bridge	Abandoned	Warren truss	1865	1988	White's Ferry Road	Chesapeake and Ohio Canal	Dickerson	Montgomery	39°09′17″N 77°31′02″W
MD-70	Chesapeake and Ohio Canal, Iron Bridge at Lock No. 68	Abandoned	Warren truss	1910	1988		Chesapeake and Ohio Canal	Oldtown	Allegany	39°31′50″N 78°35′17″W
MD-71	Chesapeake and Ohio Canal, McCoy's Ferry Road Culvert	Extant	Stone arch	1840	1988	McCoy's Ferry Road	Chesapeake and Ohio Canal	Big Spring	Washington	39°36′31″N 77°58′12″W
MD-72	Chesapeake and Ohio Canal, Prather's Neck Road Culvert	Extant	Stone arch	1840	1988	Chesapeake and Ohio Canal	Neck Road	Big Spring	Washington	
MD-79	Mitchell's Mill Bridge	Relocated	Pratt truss	1885	1990	Carrs Mill Road	Winter's Run	Bel Air	Harford	39°32′06″N 76°24′02″W
MD-82	Stauffer Road Bridge	Relocated	Pratt truss	1930	1996	Stauffer Road	Israel Creek	Walkersville	Frederick	39°28′01″N 77°20′45″W
MD-83	Waverly Street Bridge	Replaced	Bowstring arch truss	1892	1991	Waverly Street	George's Creek	Westernport	Allegany	39°29′23″N 79°02′34″W
MD-85	Governor's Bridge	Extant	Pratt truss	1912	1992	Governor's Bridge Road	Patuxent River	Bowie	Prince George's and Anne Arundel	38°57′05″N 76°41′36″W
MD-88	Glendale Road Bridge	Demolished	Pennsylvania truss	1924	1992	Glendale Road	Deep Creek Lake	McHenry	Garrett	39°30′20″N 79°18′39″W
MD-89	Hagerstown Road Bridge	Relocated	Pratt truss	1920	1993	Old Hagerstown Road	Little Catoctin Creek	Middletown	Frederick	39°27′13″N 77°33′36″W
MD-90	Crum Road Bridge	Relocated	Bowstring arch truss	1890	1993	Crum Road	Israel Creek	Walkersville	Frederick	39°28′47″N 77°19′39″W
MD-92	Carderock Overpass	Exant	Prestressed concrete girder	1962	1994	Carderock Access Road	Clara Barton Parkway	Carderock	Montgomery	38°58′21″N 77°11′45″W
MD-93	Seventy-Ninth Street Cabin John Underpass	Extant	Reinforced concrete rigid frame	1961	1994	Clara Barton Parkway	79th Street	Cabin John	Montgomery	38°58′22″N 77°09′53″W
MD-94	Cabin John Overpass	Extant	Prestressed concrete girder	1962	1994	Erricson Road	Clara Barton Parkway	Cabin John	Montgomery	38°58′16″N 77°09′10″W
MD-95	Cabin John Creek Bridge	Extant	Reinforced concrete box girder	1963	1994	Clara Barton Parkway	Cabin John Creek	Cabin John	Montgomery	38°58′16″N 77°08′52″W
MD-96	George Washington Memorial Parkway Northbound Lane Overpass	Extant	Reinforced concrete rigid frame	1961	1994	Future George Washington Memorial Parkway	Clara Barton Parkway	Glen Echo	Montgomery	38°57′46″N 77°08′09″W
MD-97	Sycamore Island Pedestrian Overpass	Extant	Reinforced concrete box girder	1968	1994	Trail to Sycamore Island	Clara Barton Parkway	Cabin John	Montgomery	38°57′31″N 77°07′54″W
MD-98	Brookmont Pedestrian Overpass	Extant	Reinforced concrete box girder	1967	1994	Brookmont pedestrian crossing	Clara Barton Parkway	Glen Echo	Montgomery	38°56′22″N 77°07′14″W
MD-99	Little Falls Branch Bridge	Extant	Prestressed concrete girder	1961	1994	Clara Barton Parkway	Little Falls Branch	Glen Echo	Montgomery	38°56′15″N 77°07′03″W
MD-100-A	Suitland Parkway, Henson Creek Culvert Headwalls at Station 200 Plus 35	Extant	Culvert	1944		Suitland Parkway	Henson Creek	Suitland	Prince George's	38°50′10″N 76°53′59″W
MD-100-B	Suitland Parkway, Henson Creek Culvert Headwalls at Station 274 Plus 50	Extant	Culvert	1944		Suitland Parkway	Henson Creek	Suitland	Prince George's	38°49′51″N 76°52′30″W
MD-106	Wilson Mill Bridge	Replaced	Parker truss	1930	1994	MD 161	Deer Creek	Darlington	Harford	39°37′01″N 76°12′04″W
MD-108	Tilghman Island Bridge	Relocated	Rolling lift (Scherzer) bascule	1934	1998	Chesapeake Bay Maritime Museum grounds	Perry Cabin Lane	Saint Michaels	Talbot	38°47′19″N 76°13′28″W\
MD-109	Proenty Road Bridge	Replaced	Pratt truss	1926	1994	Proenty Road	Jennings Run	Corriganville	Allegany	39°41′29″N 78°48′13″W
MD-110	Boston Street Bridge	Extant	Stone arch	1902	1994	Boston Street	Harris Creek	Baltimore	Baltimore	39°16′49″N 76°34′48″W
MD-112	Weems Creek Bridge	Replaced	Swing span	1929	1995	MD 436	Weems Creek	Annapolis	Anne Arundel	38°59′34″N 76°30′28″W
MD-115	Western Maryland Railway Bridge	Demolished	Steel rolled stringer	1932	1995	Western Maryland Railway	MD 51	Spring Gap	Allegany	39°33′52″N 78°42′48″W
MD-119	River Road Bridge	Replaced	Pratt truss	1884	1993	Casselman River Road	Casselman River	Grantsville	Garrett	39°42′07″N 79°08′12″W
MD-120	Harmony Road Bridge	Replaced	Pratt truss	1918	1996	Harmony Road	Little Catoctin Creek	Myersville	Frederick	39°28′56″N 77°32′06″W
MD-123	Chesapeake and Ohio Canal, Conococheague Creek Aqueduct	Extant	Stone arch	1834	1996	Chesapeake and Ohio Canal	Conococheague Creek	Williamsport	Washington	39°36′05″N 77°49′41″W
MD-124	Allender Road Bridge	Replaced	Steel built-up girder	1945	1997	Allender Road	CSX Philadelphia Subdivision	White Marsh	Baltimore	39°24′03″N 76°24′25″W
MD-125	Flintville Bridge	Replaced	Pratt truss	1927	1998	MD 623 (Flintville Road)	Broad Creek	Castleton	Harford	39°41′46″N 76°14′41″W
MD-127	Clarysville Bridge	Extant	Stone arch	1812	1994	National Road	Braddock Run	Clarysville	Allegany	39°38′35″N 78°53′21″W
MD-128	Little Crossings Bridge	Extant	Stone arch	1813	1993	National Road	Casselman River	Grantsville	Garrett	39°41′48″N 79°08′37″W
MD-170	Bollman Truss Bridge	Extant	Pratt truss		2007			Westminster	Carroll	39°40′02″N 77°01′01″W
MD-174	Gilpin's Falls Covered Bridge	Extant	Burr truss	1860	2012	MD 272 (North East Road) (former)	North East Creek	North East	Cecil	39°38′56″N 75°57′20″W
MD-180	Baltimore and Ohio Railroad, Locust Point Transfer Bridges	Extant		1911	2010	Baltimore and Ohio Railroad (former)		Baltimore	Baltimore	39°16′29″N 76°35′20″W
MD-183-B	Chesapeake and Ohio Canal, Big Slackwater Towpath, Pipe Culvert	Extant	Culvert		2005	Chesapeake and Ohio Canal towpath	Unnamed stream	Williamsport	Washington	
MD-187	Jericho Road Covered Bridge	Extant	Burr truss	1865	2015	Jericho Road	Little Gunpowder Falls	Kingsville and Jerusalem	Baltimore and Harford	39°27′34″N 76°23′16″W
MD-190	Covered Bridge Educational Models	Extant			2017	Johns Hopkins University		Baltimore	Baltimore	39°19′40″N 76°37′15″W
MD-195	Baltimore and Ohio Railroad, Metropolitan Branch Bridge 9A	Relocated	Steel built-up girder	1918	2019	Talbot Avenue	CSX Metropolitan Subdivision	Silver Spring	Montgomery	39°00′07″N 77°02′41″W
WV-36	Baltimore and Ohio Railroad, Bollman Bridge	Replaced	Bollman truss	1868	1987	Baltimore and Ohio Railroad (former)	Potomac River	Maryland Heights, Maryland, and Harpers Ferry, West Virginia	Washington County, Maryland, and Jefferson County, West Virginia	39°19′27″N 77°43′43″W

== See also ==
- List of bridges on the National Register of Historic Places in Maryland
- List of covered bridges in Maryland
- List of tunnels documented by the Historic American Engineering Record in Maryland
