= Waverly Street Bridge =

- U.S. National Register of Historic Places
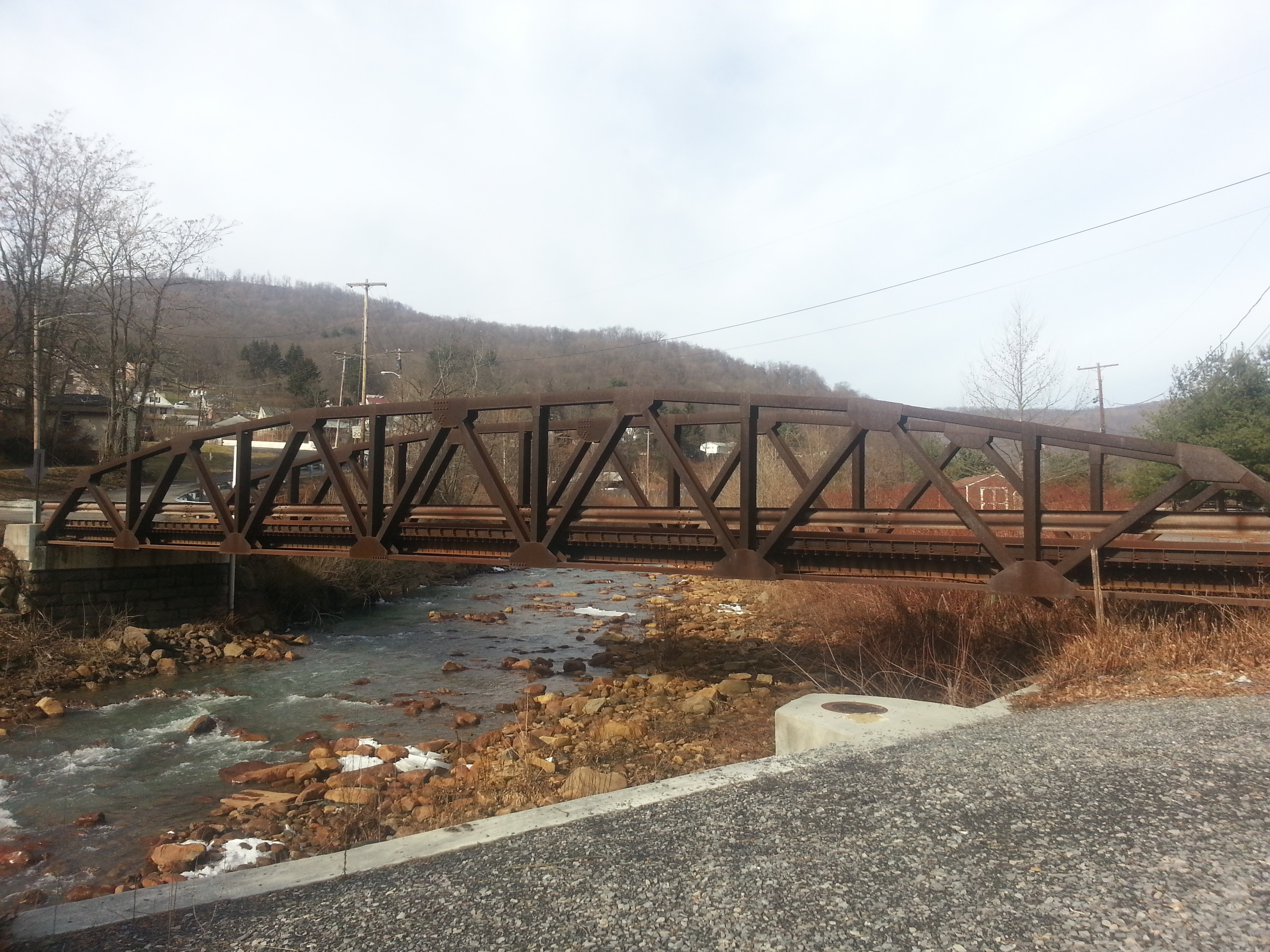
- Replacement bridge in January 2014

- Location within Maryland Location within the United States
- Location: Waverly St. at Georges Creek, Westernport, Maryland
- Coordinates: 39°29′23″N 79°2′34″W
- Area: less than one acre
- Built: 1892
- Architect: King Bridge Co.
- Architectural style: bowstring arch truss
- NRHP reference No.: 84001327
- Added to NRHP: September 7, 1984

The Waverly Street Bridge, also called the Westernport Bowstring Arch Truss Bridge, was a historic steel bowstring truss bridge at Westernport, Allegany County, Maryland, United States. It carried vehicular traffic on Waverly Street over George's Creek. The bridge had a span length of 108 feet (33 m). It was built in 1892, by the King Bridge Company of Cleveland, Ohio.

The Waverly Street Bridge was listed on the National Register of Historic Places in 1984. It was demolished in 1991.

== See also ==
- List of bridges documented by the Historic American Engineering Record in Maryland
- List of bridges on the National Register of Historic Places in Maryland
