= Old Mill Road Bridge =

- U.S. National Register of Historic Places
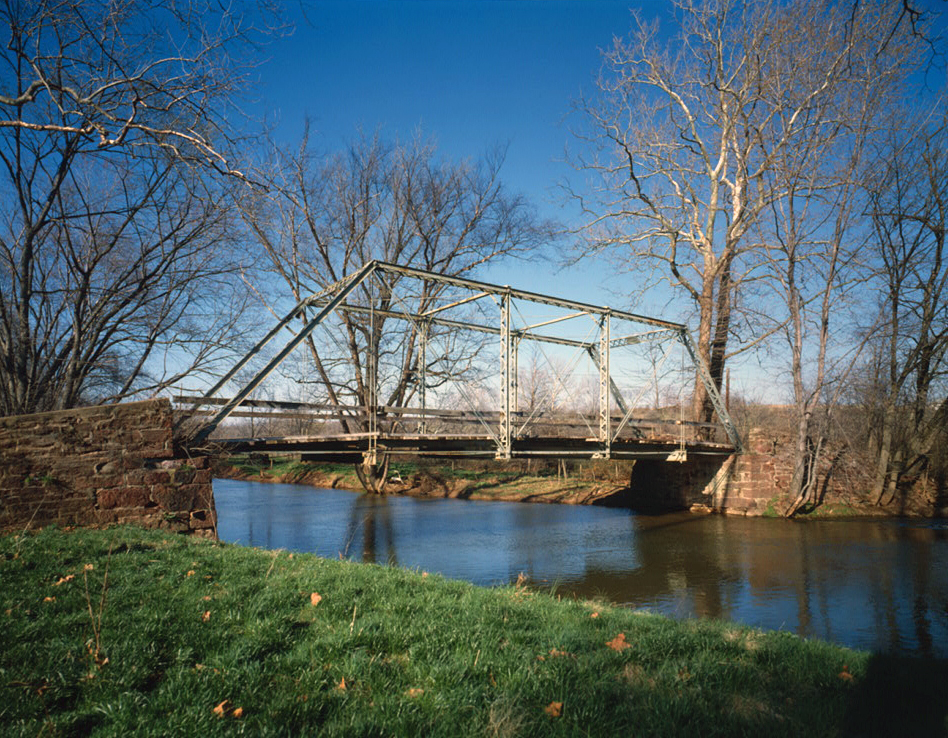

- Location within Maryland Location within the United States
- Location: West of Rocky Ridge on Old Mill Rd. over Owens Creek, Rocky Ridge, Maryland
- Coordinates: 39°36′7″N 77°20′19″W
- Area: 0.2 acres (0.081 ha)
- Built: 1882
- Built by: Pittsburgh Bridge Co.
- Architectural style: Pratt truss
- NRHP reference No.: 79001131
- Added to NRHP: March 7, 1979

The Old Mill Road Bridge is a historic bridge near Rocky Ridge, Frederick County, Maryland, United States. The bridge spans Owens Creek southwest of Rocky Ridge on Old Mill Road. It is a Pratt half-hip through truss structure in a single span 69 feet (21 m) long and 16 feet (4.9 m). It was built in 1882 by the Pittsburgh Bridge Company.

The Old Mill Road Bridge was listed on the National Register of Historic Places in 1979.

== See also ==
- List of bridges documented by the Historic American Engineering Record in Maryland
- List of bridges on the National Register of Historic Places in Maryland
