= List of bridges on the National Register of Historic Places in Maryland =

This is a list of bridges and tunnels on the National Register of Historic Places in the U.S. state of Maryland.

Name	Image	Built	Listed	Location	County	Type
B & O Railroad Potomac River Crossing		1894, 1931	February 14, 1978	Harpers Ferry, West Virginia; 39°19′27″N 77°43′43″W	Washington	
B & O Bridge	B & O Bridge	ca. 1867	November 23, 1977	Keedysville; 39°30′15″N 77°42′49″W	Washington	
Bennies Hill Road Bridge		ca. 1889	June 27, 1979	Middletown; 39°24′34″N 77°34′12″W	Frederick	Bowstring arch truss
Bloomington Viaduct		1851, 1916	November 21, 1976	Bloomington; 39°28′37″N 79°4′5″W	Garrett	Multispan masonry bridge
Bollman Suspension and Trussed Bridge		1869	October 18, 1972	Savage; 39°8′5″N 76°49′31″W	Howard	Bollman Truss
Bullfrog Road Bridge	Bullfrog Road Bridge	1908	November 21, 1978	Taneytown; 39°41′44″N 77°14′25″W	Carroll	Parker truss
Carrollton Viaduct		1828, 1829	November 11, 1971	Baltimore; 39°16′31″N 76°39′19″W	Baltimore City	
Casselman's Bridge, National Road	Casselman's Bridge	1813	October 15, 1966	Grantsville	Garrett	Single arch
Crum Road Bridge		ca. 1880	December 28, 1978	Walkersville; 39°28′47″N 77°19′39″W	Frederick	Bowstring arch truss
Fourpoints Bridge		ca. 1876	November 29, 1978	Emmitsburg; 39°40′17″N 77°18′4″W	Frederick	Pratt truss
Gilpin's Falls Covered Bridge		ca. 1855	December 3, 2008	North East; 39°38′55.8″N 75°57′20.1″W	Cecil	Burr Arch Through Truss
Guilford Quarry Pratt Through Truss Bridge		1902	June 2, 2021	Guilford; 39°09′56.0″N 76°50′27.0″W	Howard	
Howard Street Tunnel	Howard Street Tunnel	1890, 1895	July 2, 1973	Baltimore; 39°18′17″N 76°37′15″W	Baltimore City	Brick-lined tunnel with iron-arched centerings
Jericho Covered Bridge		1865, 1937	September 13, 1978	Jerusalem, Kingsville; 39°27′34″N 76°23′16″W	Baltimore, Harford	Burr Arch Through Truss
LeGore Bridge		1898-1900	September 18, 1978	Woodsboro; 39°34′50″N 77°18′50″W	Frederick	Five-span stone arch
Lombard Street Bridge		1877, 1974	September 27, 1972	Baltimore; 39°19′0″N 76°42′1″W	Baltimore City	Water-main truss
Loys Station Covered Bridge		ca. 1860	June 23, 1978	Thurmont; 39°36′26″N 77°21′8″W	Frederick	Covered Multiple king post
MD 214 over Patuxent River Bridge		1935	September 23, 2025	Davidsonville; 38°54′26.6″N 76°40′22.3″W	Anne Arundel	Parker through truss
Old Mill Road Bridge		1882	March 7, 1979	Rocky Ridge; 39°36′7″N 77°20′19″W	Frederick	Pratt truss
Patterson Viaduct Ruins		1829	June 3, 1976	Catonsville, Ilchester; 39°15′0″N 76°45′51″W	Baltimore, Howard	Masonry Arch Bridge
Pocomoke River Bridge		1920	May 28, 2025	Pocomoke City; 38°04′35.4″N 75°34′15.6″W	Worcester	Bascule
Poffenberger Road Bridge	Poffenberger Road Bridge	1878	November 29, 1978	Middletown; 39°22′54″N 77°34′18″W	Frederick	Pratt or Whipple thru truss
Roddy Road Covered Bridge	Roddy Road Covered Bridge	ca. 1860	June 23, 1978	Thurmont; 39°38′26″N 77°23′39″W	Frederick	Covered Single king post
Snow Hill Drawbridge		1932	May 28, 2025	Snow Hill; 38°10′44.4″N 75°23′40.1″W	Worcester	Bascule
Sykesville Bypass Bridge		1963	December 6, 2024	Sykesville; 39°21′44″N 76°58′01″W	Howard	Aluminum box girder
Thomas Viaduct, Baltimore & Ohio Railroad		1835	October 15, 1966	Relay; 39°13′19″N 76°42′49″W	Baltimore, Howard	Multiple stone arch
Union Arch Bridge (Cabin John Aqueduct)		1864	February 28, 1973	Cabin John; 38°58′22.28″N 77°8′52.69″W	Mongtomery	Masonry arch
Utica Covered Bridge		ca. 1860	June 23, 1978	Thurmont; 39°31′28″N 77°23′46″W	Frederick	Covered Burr arch truss
Waverly Street Bridge	Waverly Street Bridge	1892	September 7, 1984	Westernport; 39°29′23″N 79°2′34″W	Allegany	bowstring arch truss
Wicomico River Bridge	Wicomico River Bridge	1927	September 15, 2025	Salisbury; 38°21′55.3″N 75°36′15.6″W	Wicomico	Bascule
Wilson's Bridge	Wilson's Bridge	1819	March 15, 1982	Hagerstown; 39°39′27″N 77°50′53″W	Washington	
