= Crum Road Bridge =

- U.S. National Register of Historic Places
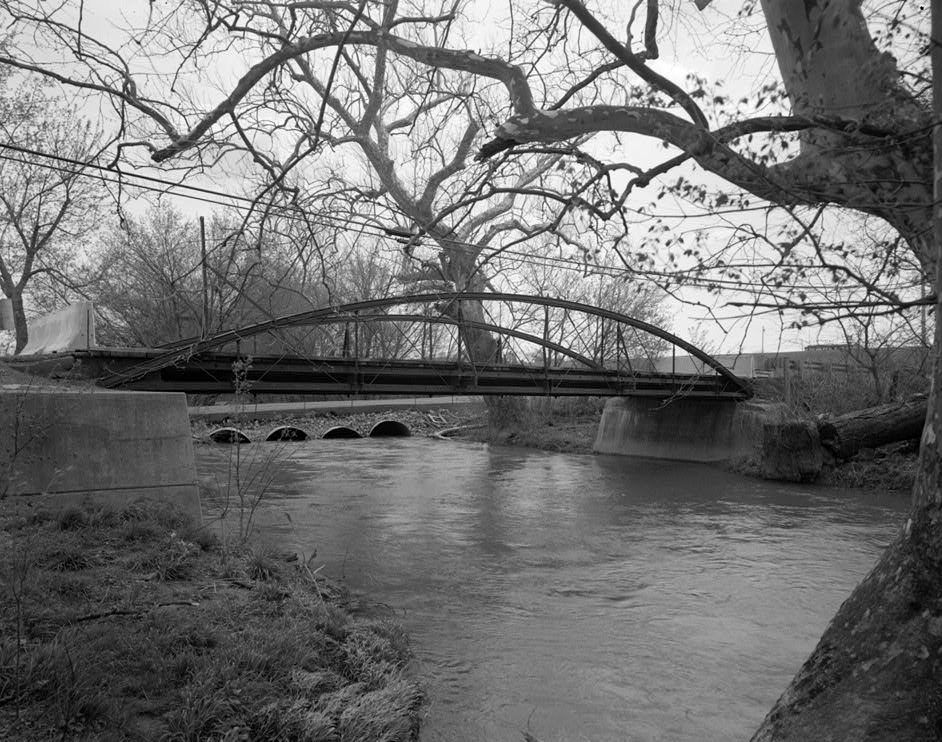

- Location within Maryland Location within the United States
- Nearest city: Walkersville, Maryland
- Coordinates: 39°28′27.545″N 77°20′25.516″W
- Area: less than one acre
- Built: 1880
- Built by: King Iron Bridge Co.
- Architectural style: bowstring arch truss
- NRHP reference No.: 78001463
- Added to NRHP: December 28, 1978

The Crum Road Bridge is a historic bridge near Frederick, Frederick County, Maryland, United States. It spanned Israel Creek southeast of Walkersville. The bridge is an iron bowstring pony bridge that is 62 feet (19 m) in length and 15.8 feet (4.8 m) in width. The Crum Road Bridge was built on or about 1875, and was probably constructed by the King Iron Bridge Company of Cleveland, Ohio.

The Crum Road Bridge was listed on the National Register of Historic Places in 1978. It was then listed in the Historic American Engineering Record in 1993. In 1995, the bridge was removed from its original location on Crum Road over Israel Creek to be replaced by a new wide span concrete bridge. The Crum Road Bridge was relocated to the Heritage Farm Park, located several miles west off of Devilbiss Bridge Road for possible future use as a pedestrian bridge. It was again relocated when it was removed from Heritage Farm Park in 2004. It is currently located in Ballenger Creek Park.

== Urban Legends & Paranormal Stories ==
Crum Road Bridge is widely known for its ghost stories and haunted reputation. According to local folklore:

- It is said to be haunted by the spirit of a woman or child who either died near the bridge or was murdered there.
- Some visitors claim to hear strange noises, whispers, or footsteps when crossing at night.
- There are reports of unexplained cold spots and eerie feelings in the area.

== See also ==
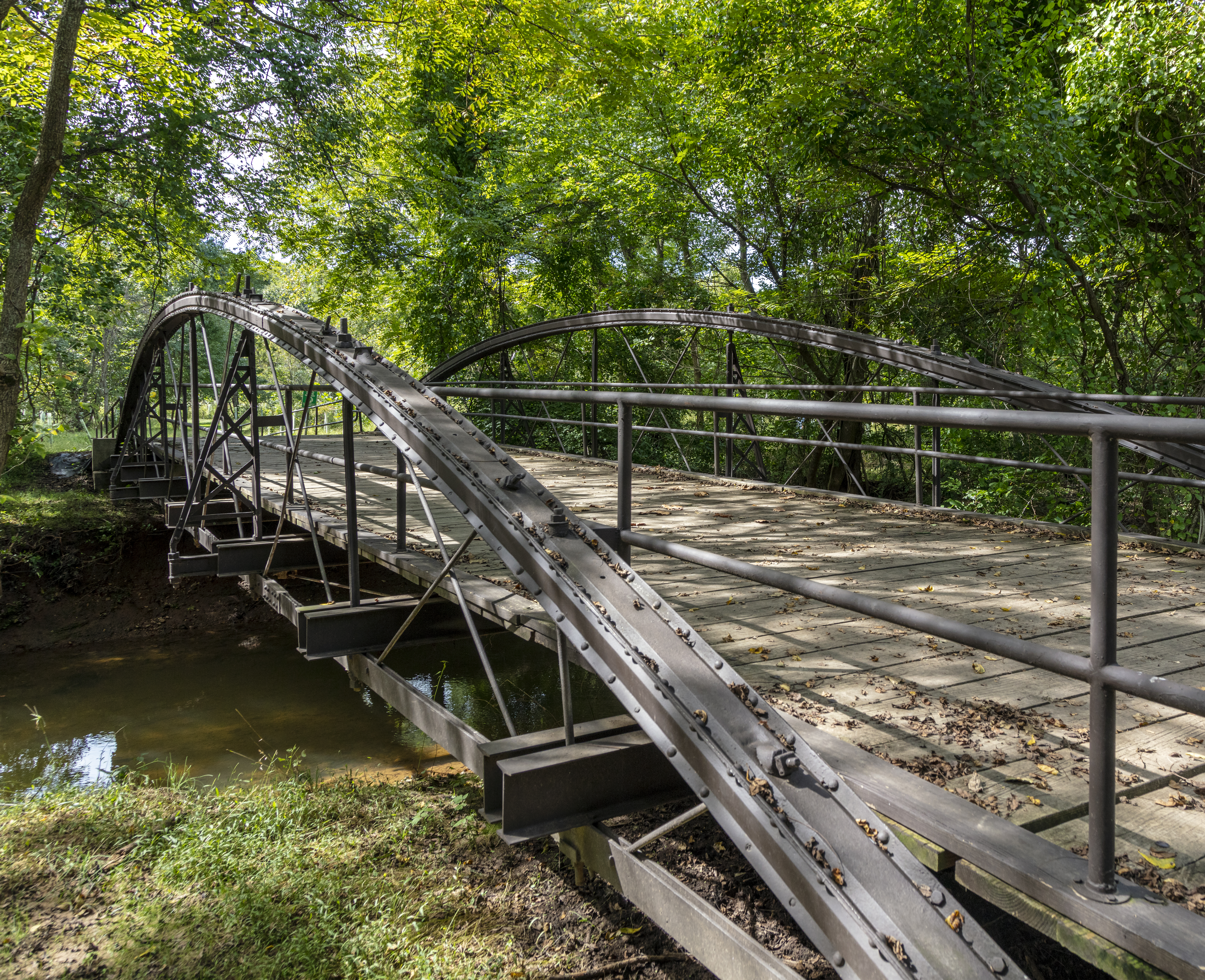
The bridge at its present location in Ballenger Creek Park

- List of bridges documented by the Historic American Engineering Record in Maryland
- List of bridges on the National Register of Historic Places in Maryland
