= Wilson's Bridge =

- U.S. National Register of Historic Places
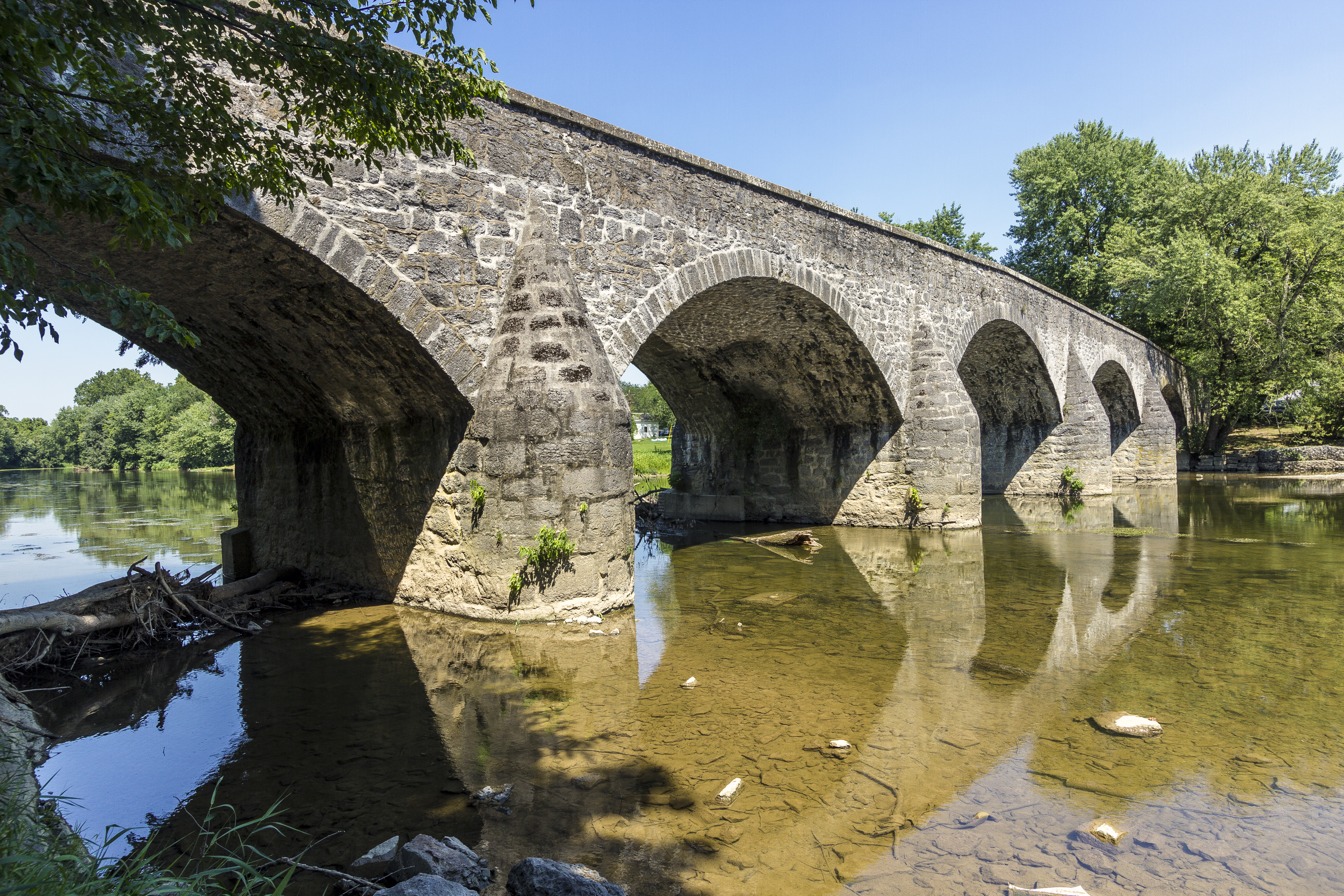

- Location within Maryland Location within the United States
- Location: U.S. Route 40, Hagerstown, Maryland
- Coordinates: 39°39′27″N 77°50′53″W
- Area: less than one acre
- Built: 1819
- Built by: Silas Harry
- NRHP reference No.: 82002822
- Added to NRHP: March 15, 1982

Wilson's Bridge is a bridge near Hagerstown, Washington County, Maryland, United States. It originally carried the Hagerstown and Conococheague Turnpike, the National Road, across Conococheague Creek 7 miles (11 km) west of Hagerstown. The five-arched structure, the longest of the county's stone bridges, is 210 feet (64 m) in length and is constructed of coursed local limestone. The bridge was erected in 1819 by Silas Harry, who had built similar bridges in Pennsylvania. The bridge was closed in June 1972 when it was damaged by floods which occurred during Tropical Storm Agnes.

Wilson's Bridge was listed on the National Register of Historic Places in 1982.

== See also ==
- List of bridges documented by the Historic American Engineering Record in Maryland
- List of bridges on the National Register of Historic Places in Maryland
