= Poffenberger Road Bridge =

- U.S. National Register of Historic Places
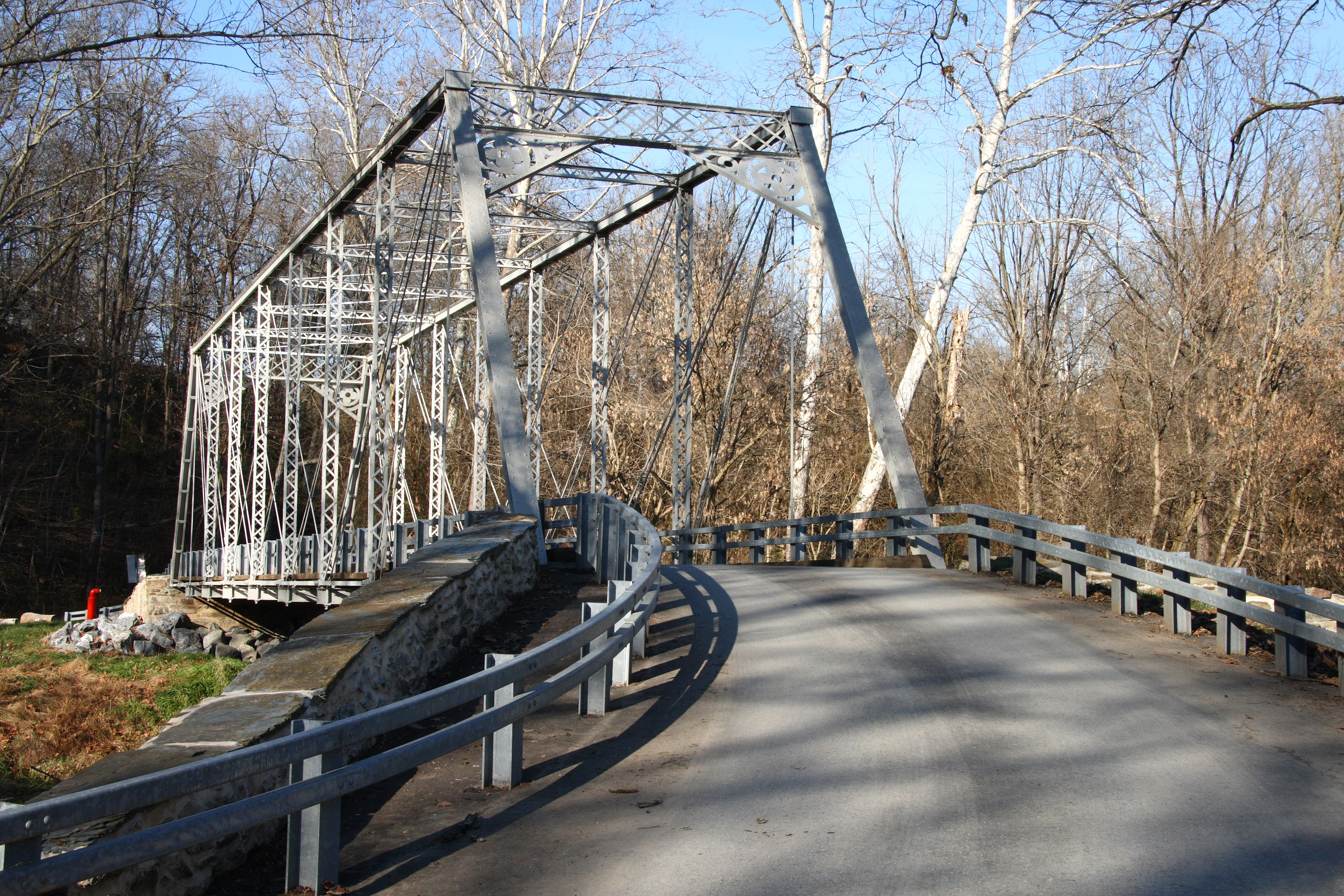

- Location within Maryland Location within the United States
- Location: Poffenberger Road over Catoctin Creek, Middletown, Maryland
- Coordinates: 39°22′54″N 77°34′18″W
- Area: less than one acre
- Built: 1878
- Built by: Wrought Iron Bridge Company
- Architectural style: Pratt or Whipple thru truss
- NRHP reference No.: 78001459
- Added to NRHP: November 29, 1978

The Poffenberger Road Bridge, near Jefferson, Maryland, is a wrought iron bridge by the Wrought Iron Bridge Company of Canton, Ohio. The bridge is similar to the Fourpoints Bridge elsewhere in Frederick County. The bridge is a single-span double-intersection Pratt truss. It was built circa 1878 and remains in daily use.

It was listed on the National Register of Historic Places in 1978.

== See also ==
- List of bridges documented by the Historic American Engineering Record in Maryland
- List of bridges on the National Register of Historic Places in Maryland
