= Aqueducts on the C&O Canal =

Masonry constructions which carried the canal over wide rivers and streams

The Chesapeake and Ohio Canal (C&O) used 11 navigable aqueducts to carry the canal over rivers and streams that were too wide for a culvert to contain. Aqueducts, like locks and other masonry structures, were called "works of art" by the canal board of directors.

In addition to these 11 aqueducts, there was the Alexandria Aqueduct, which connected the C&O Canal with Alexandria, Virginia, and the Broad Run Trunk Aqueduct, made of wood, and was originally a double culvert, and never listed in company records as an aqueduct.

The aqueducts of the C&O, unlike the Roman aqueducts, were built with inferior materials and cement, and did not have a long life expectancy. Usually the trash from the floods did the most harm to the aqueducts.

== Seneca Aqueduct ==
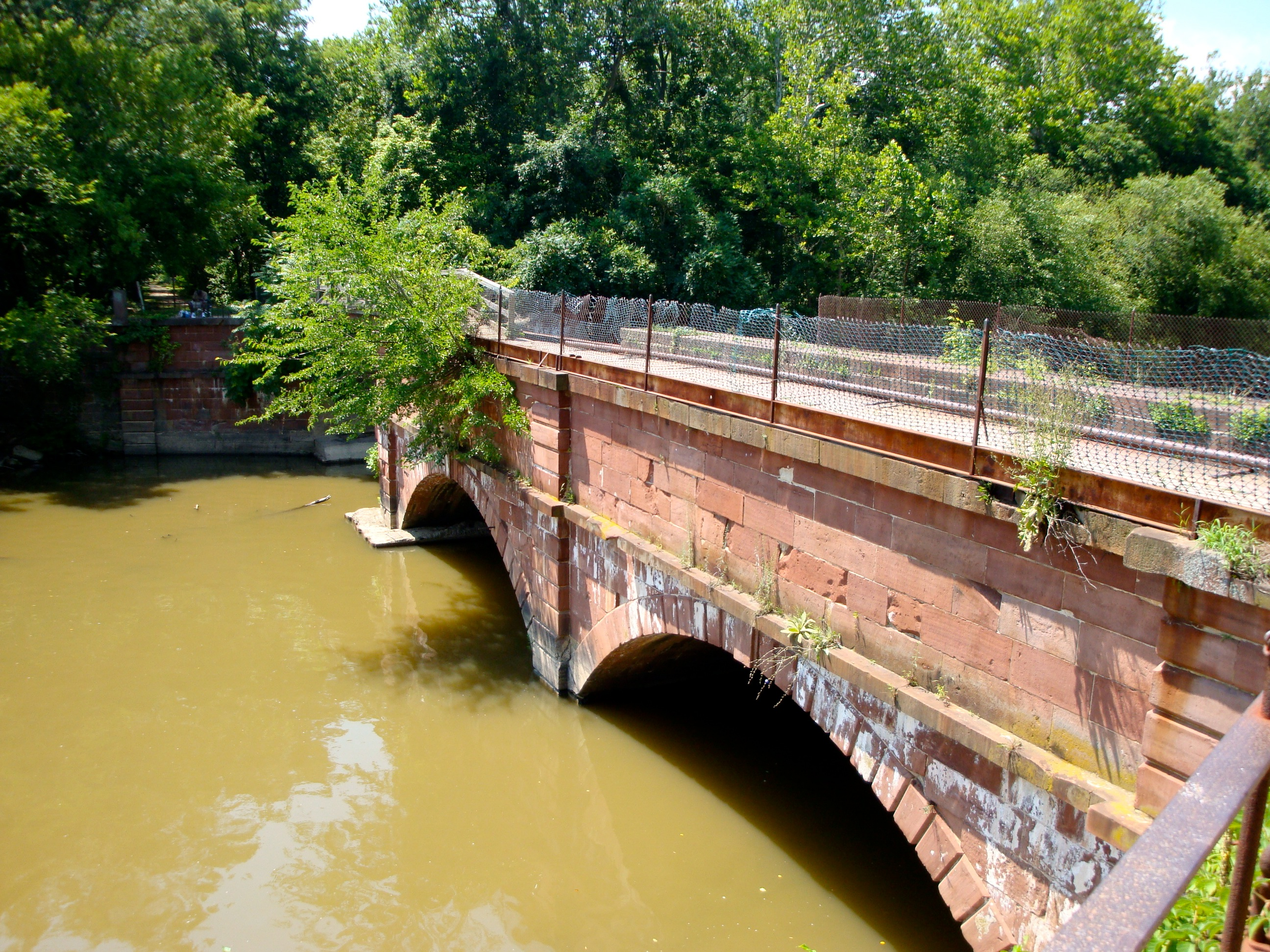
Seneca Aqueduct

The Seneca Aqueduct (#1), located in Montgomery County, Maryland, also included a lock built in (Riley's Lock). The aqueduct traverses Seneca Creek and was built from 1829 to 1832. It collapsed in 1971 due to flooding.

There was a stone cutting mill just at this point, on the upstream side. It cut stone from Marble Quarry (above White's Ferry on the canal), and Cedar Point Quarry (which was around Violette's lock, one lock downstream), as well as the quarries of Seneca sandstone. It was powered by canal water diverted into a mill race to a turbine.

This aqueduct was also the site of an incident in 1897 when the passenger steam packet boat leaving the aqueduct collided with a freight boat loaded with watermelons. There were no injuries to the passengers when the boat sank, but the local people collected free watermelons floating in the turning basin just above the aqueduct.

== Broad Run Trunk (Aqueduct) ==
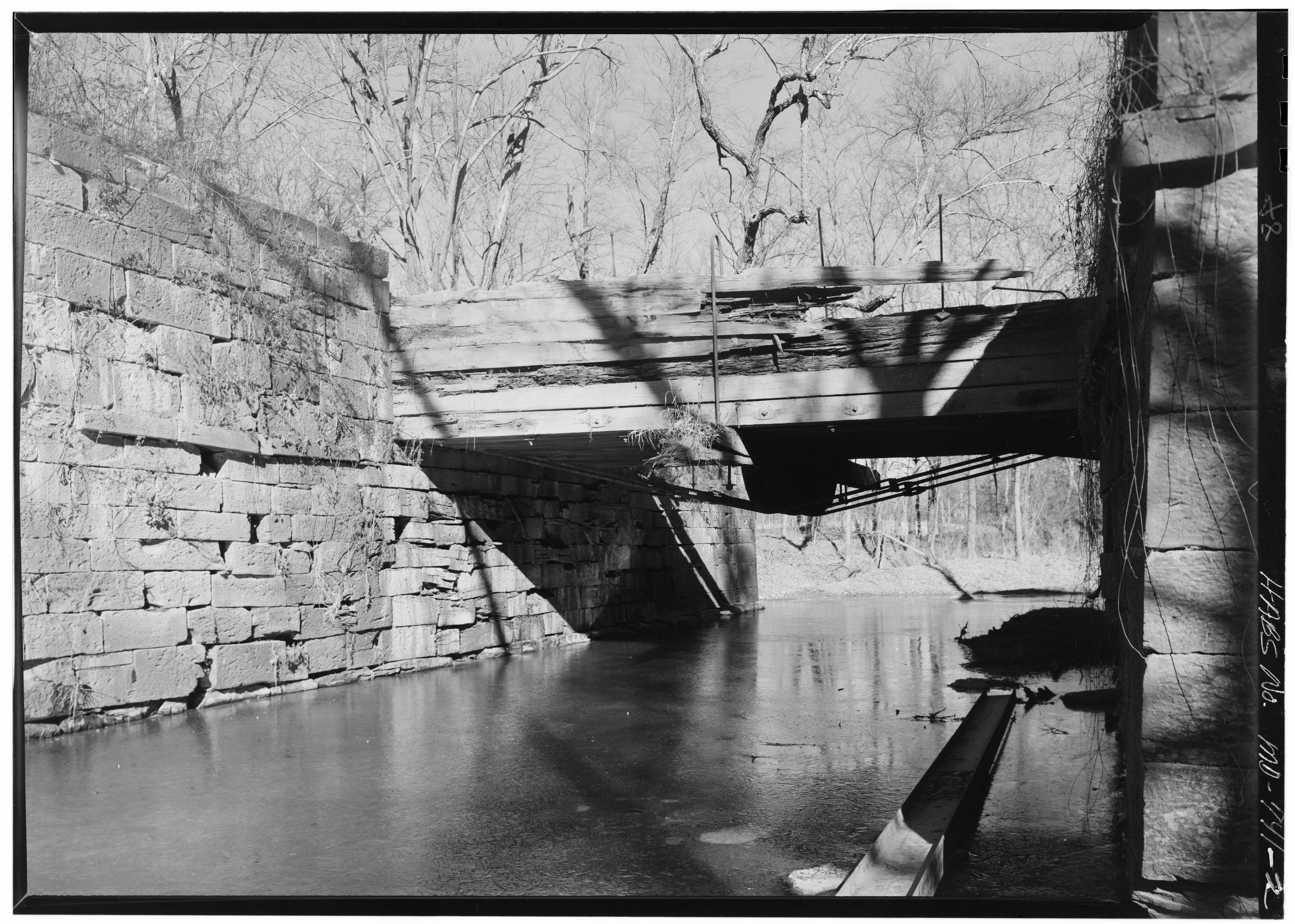
The Broad Run Trunk, looking from the west (river) side.

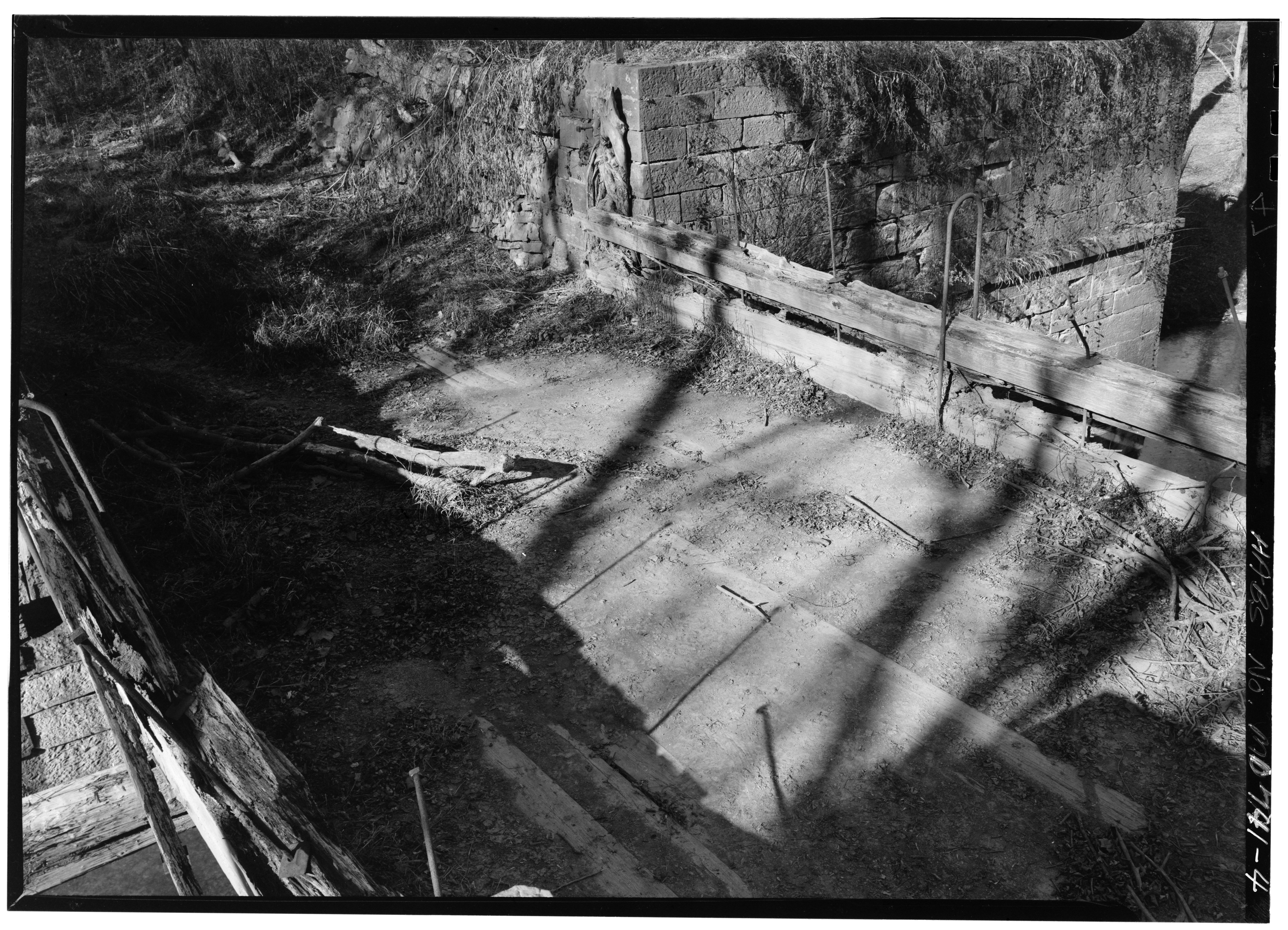
View of the aqueduct bed

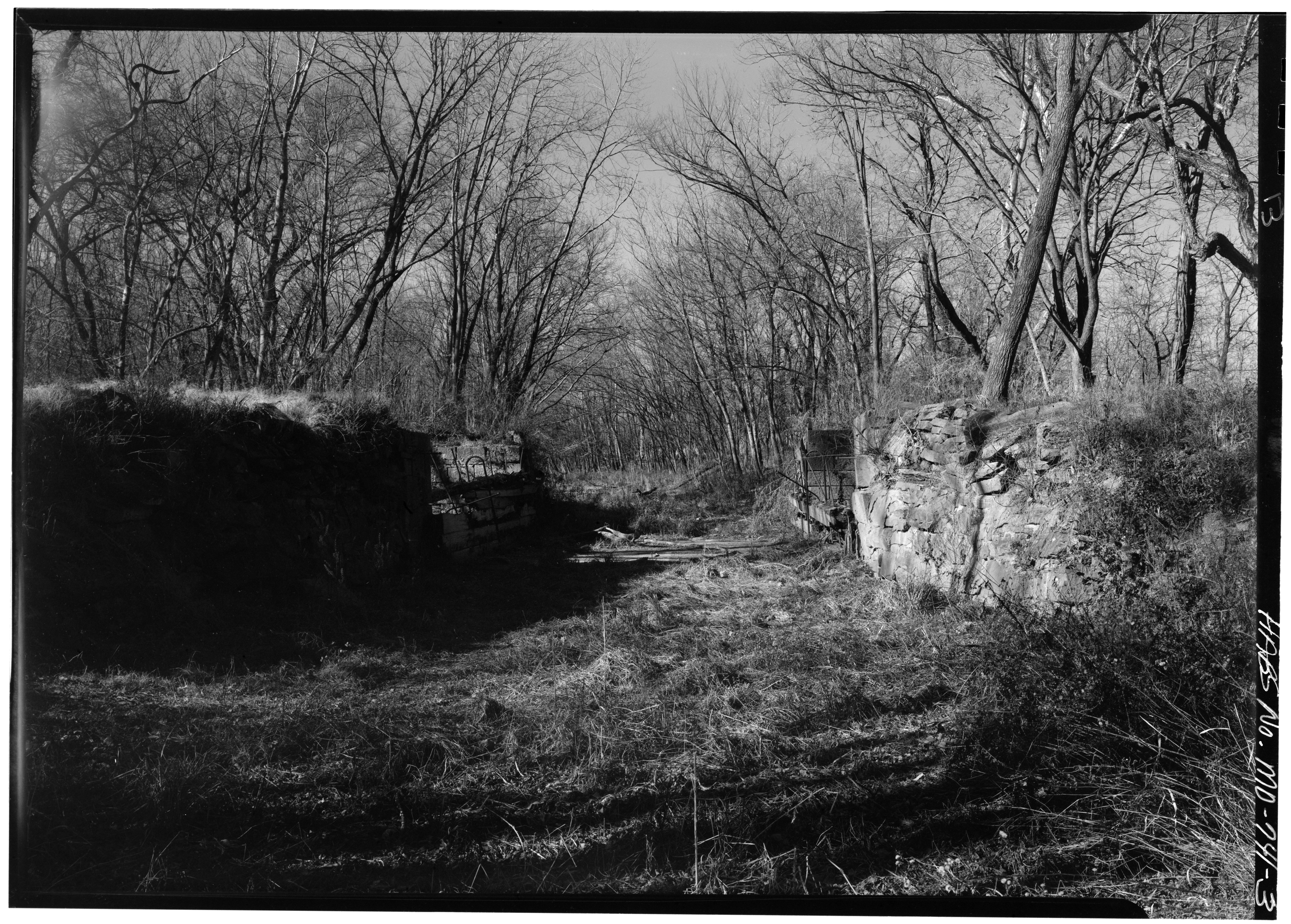
Looking upstream towards the aqueduct, from the canal prism.

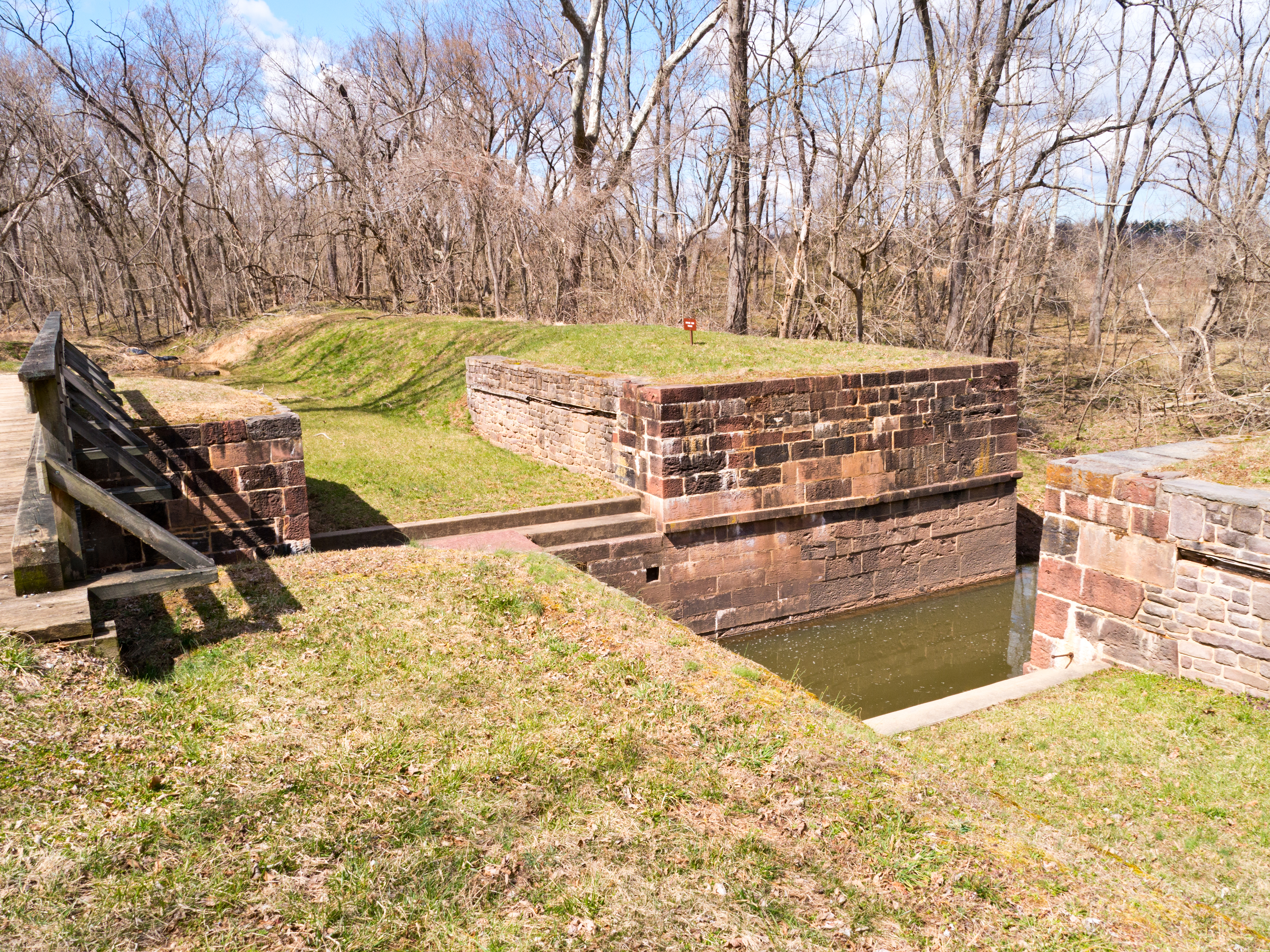
Broad Run Trunk today.

This "unofficial" aqueduct crosses Broad Run in Montgomery County. It was originally two stone culverts 16 feet (4.9 m) long, and listed as Culvert #44 1/2. Construction originally began in 1829, on section 53, and after several contractors worked on it, was completed in 1833. It later washed out in 1846. A wooden trunk was put in to keep navigation open. It deteriorated until it could not be repaired, and was rebuilt 1856. Troops burned it during the American Civil War, and it was replaced again. The wood rotted and constantly had to be replaced. Although it was an aqueduct, the company records still listed it as a culvert.

== Monocacy Aqueduct ==
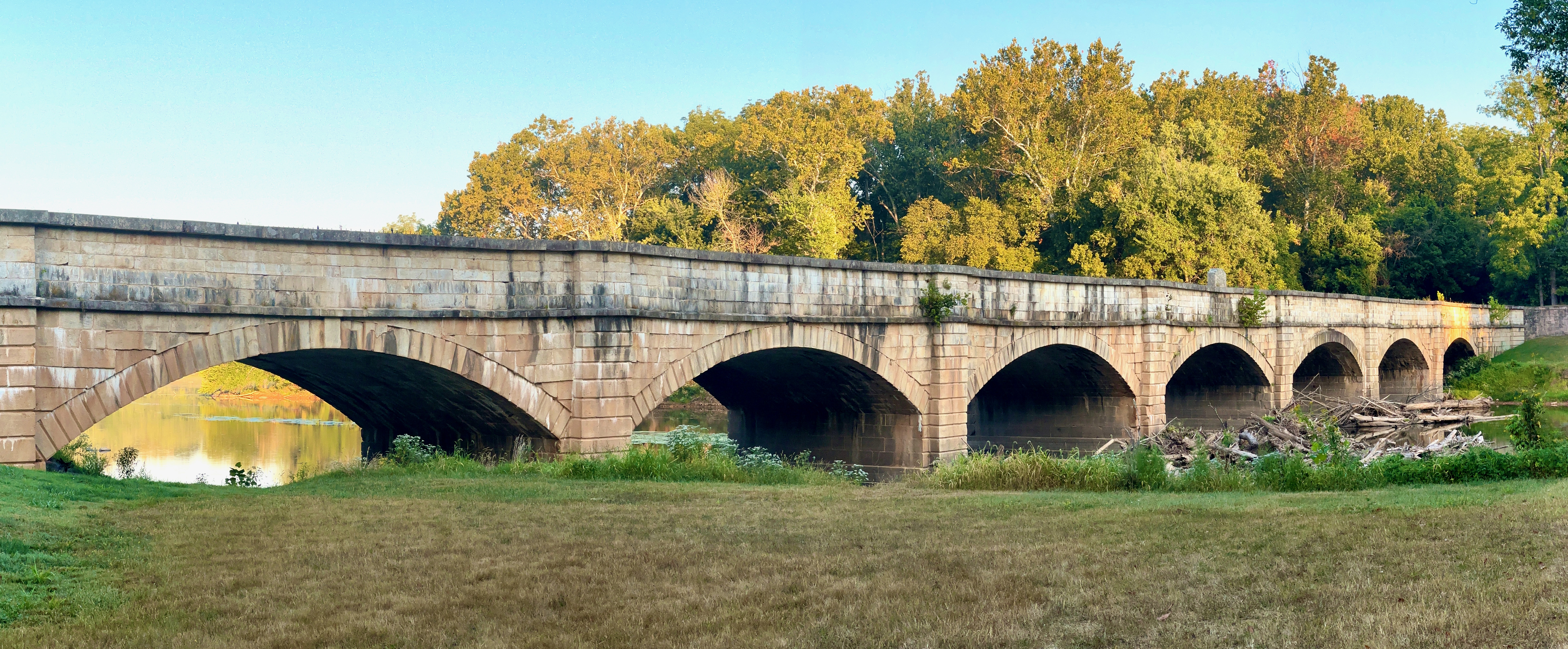
Monocacy Aqueduct restored

The Monocacy Aqueduct (#2) in Frederick County, Maryland is the longest aqueduct on the canal, crossing the Monocacy River. It was completed in May 1833. It is 516 feet (157 m) long, with seven 54 feet (16 m) arches. It was begun in March 1829 and finished in April 1833. Quartz sandstone came from nearby Sugar Loaf Mountain. Some stone was boated down the river, and the rest by a wagon tramway, having oak rails covered with iron straps.

== Catoctin Aqueduct ==
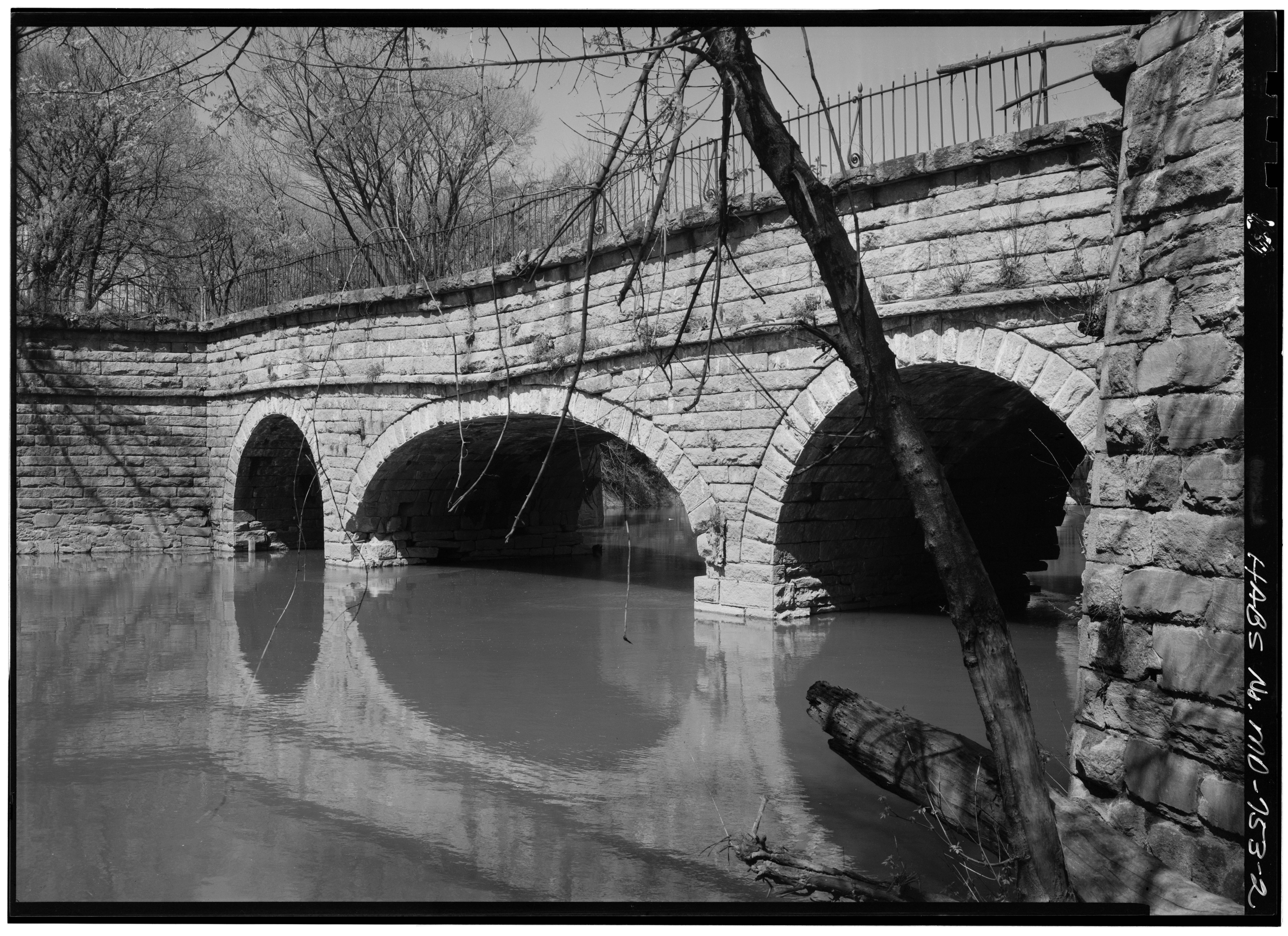
Catoctin Creek aqueduct before collapse from River side.

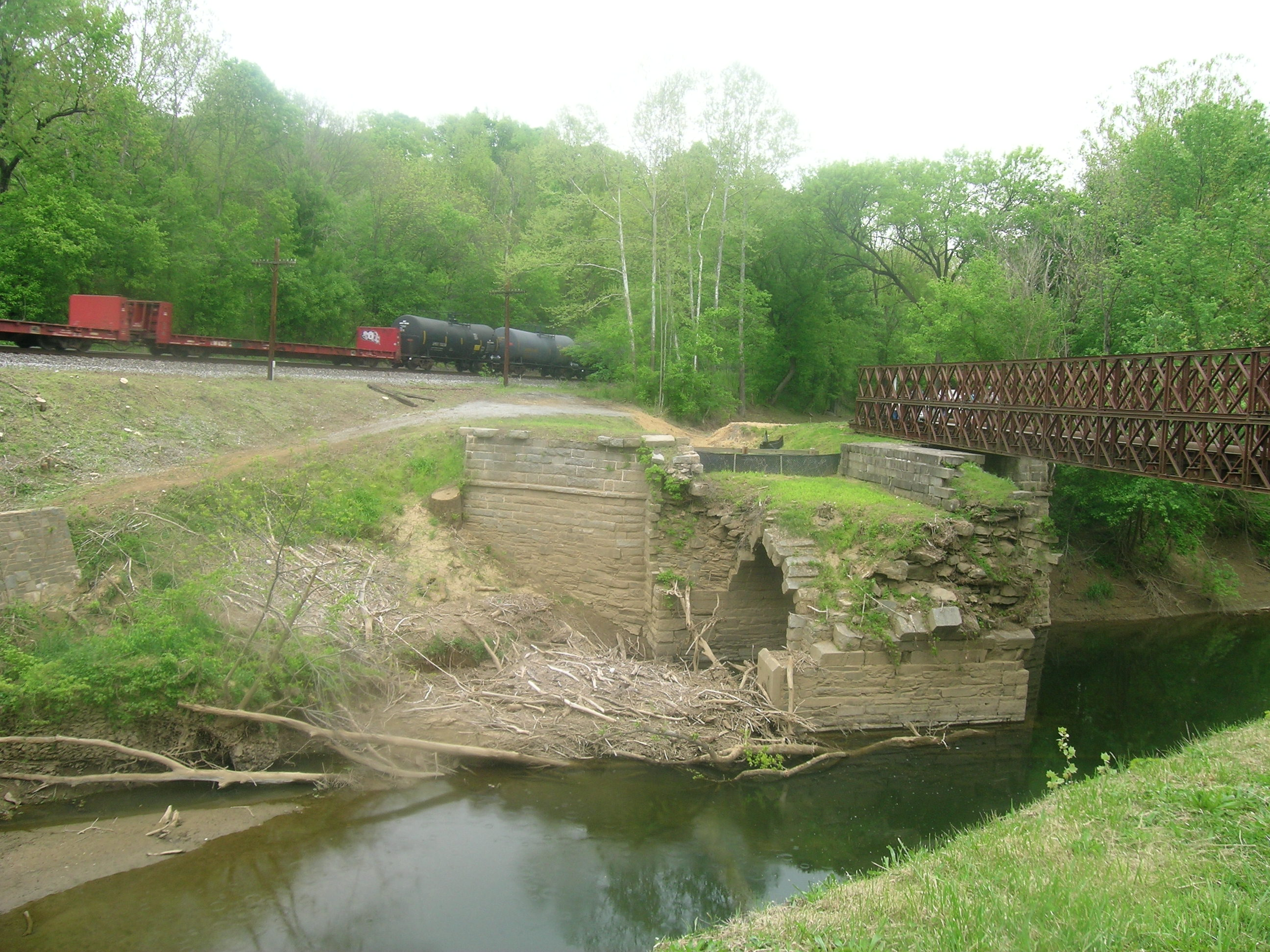
The collapsed aqueduct

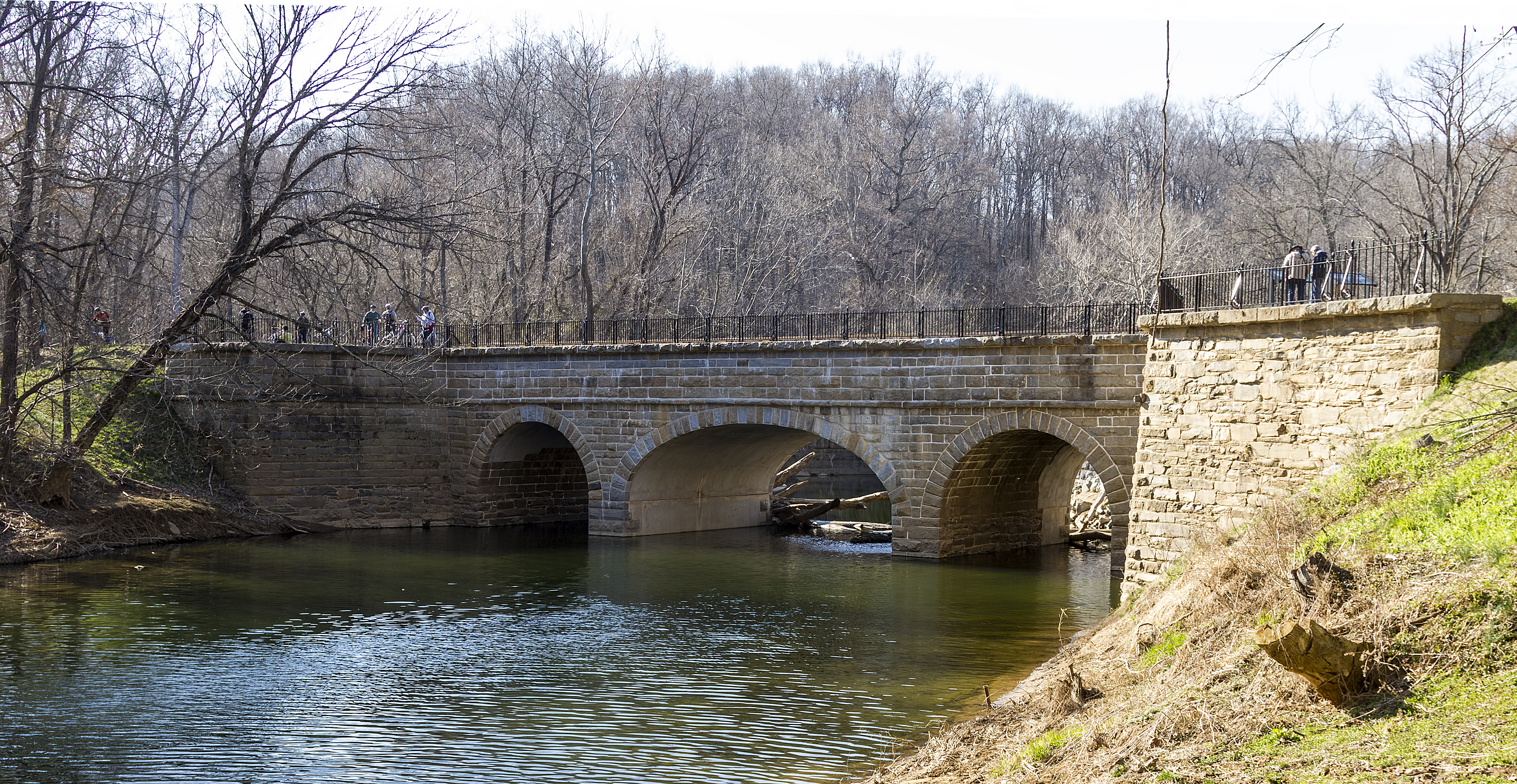
Catoctin Creek, after reconstruction in 2011.

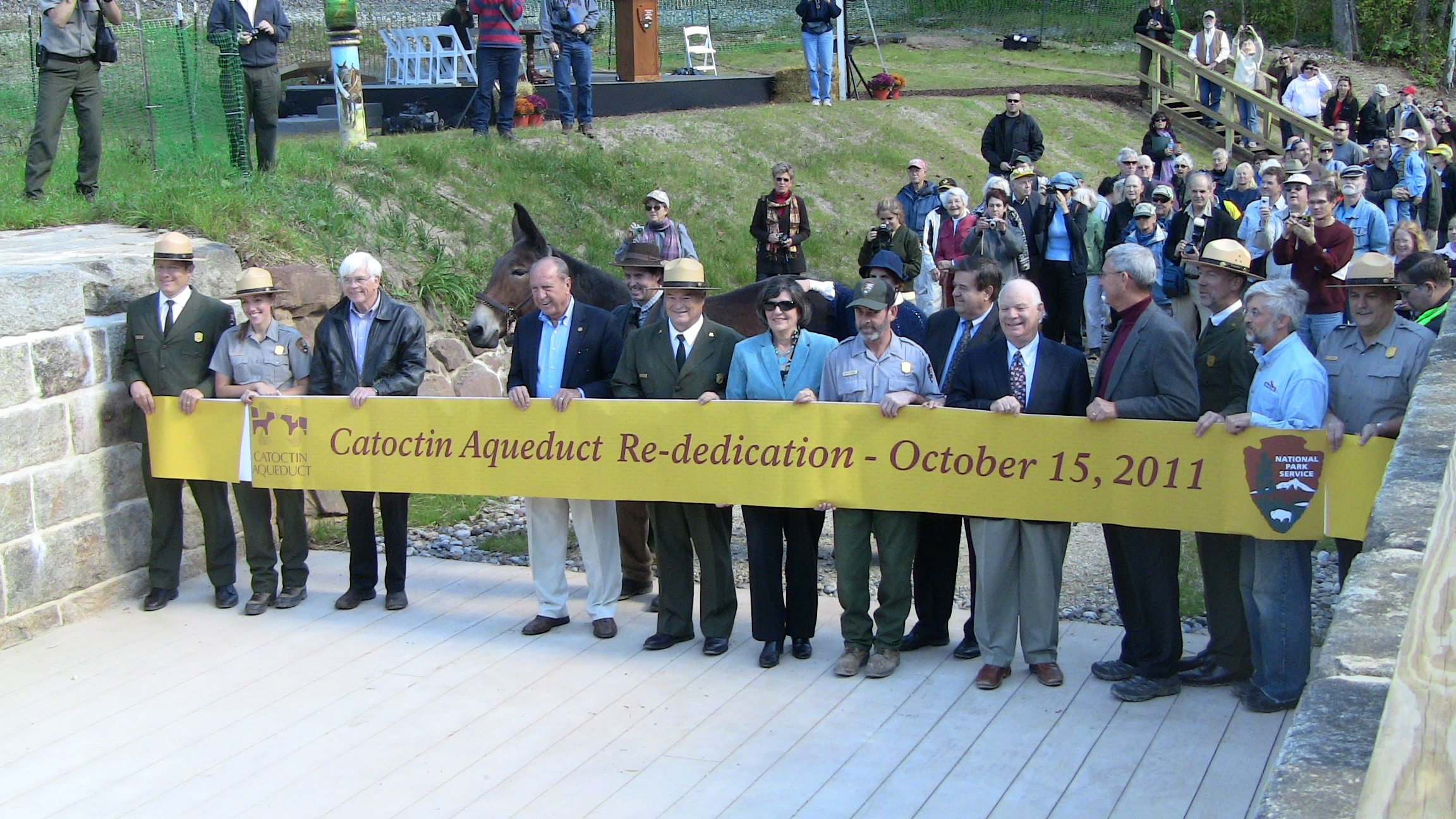
Rededication ceremony for the Catoctin Aqueduct on October 15, 2011

The Catoctin Aqueduct (#3) crosses Catoctin Creek in Frederick County. This aqueduct, completed in 1834, was also called the "Crooked Aqueduct" because of the sharp turns before and after it on the canal. Recklessness among boatmen (usually because of speeding) resulted in accidents, damaging the sides of the aqueduct. In March 1870, the board ordered that all boats should slow down 50 yards from the aqueduct, and stationed a watchman to ensure compliance, as well as printing handbills to that effect. Boatmen called this creek "Jug Creek."

It was made of granite from Ellicott Mills, Maryland. Since it uses two different kinds of arches: elliptical in the center, and Roman on the side, the two stresses do not balance each other, and are prone to failure. Cited as "one of the worst built structures" on the canal, during construction the west pier was torn down and rebuilt. Leaking seriously since 1859, it sagged badly in 1926, finally collapsing on October 31, 1973.

Between 2007 and 2010, funds were raised for restoring the aqueduct. In 2010 the National Park Service awarded a $3.93 million contract to Corman Construction to carry out the restoration work. 459 original stones from the aqueduct were found and used in the restoration, and the aqueduct was reopened on October 15, 2011.

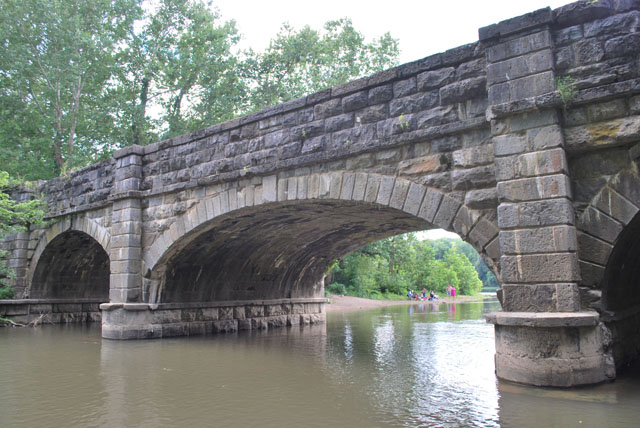
Antietam Creek Aqueduct

== Antietam Creek Aqueduct ==
The Antietam Creek aqueduct (#4), which is on section 126, was begun in 1832 and completed in April 1835.

Media related to Antietam Creek Aqueduct at Wikimedia Commons

== Conococheague Creek Aqueduct ==
The Conococheague Creek Aqueduct (#5) was contracted to Michael Byrne (who completed more contracts on the canal later) in 1832. Work started in 1833, and was completed in November 1835 at a cost of $43,283.78. It is at the 99.80 mile mark (Section No. 188).

This aqueduct, made of local limestone, was damaged during the Civil War by Mosby's Raiders. The stonework wall "went out" (as a boatman would say) three times: 1865, 1887, and finally in 1920.

On April 20, 1920, when the wall went out, boat #73 was returning to Cumberland after dropping off coal in Williamsport. The boat bounced off the wall, and Captain Myers said that he saw the aqueduct wall shudder, and shouted to his stepson to release the mules. The wall collapsed, and Captain Myers was able to jump to safety before the boat fell through the break into the creek. All survived the accident.

The NPS began a restoration project in August 2017 to restore the Conococheague aqueduct and surrounding areas to operating condition resembling that of the 1920s. They plan to rewater the aqueduct and section of the canal after finishing this project. The projected cost is $9 million.

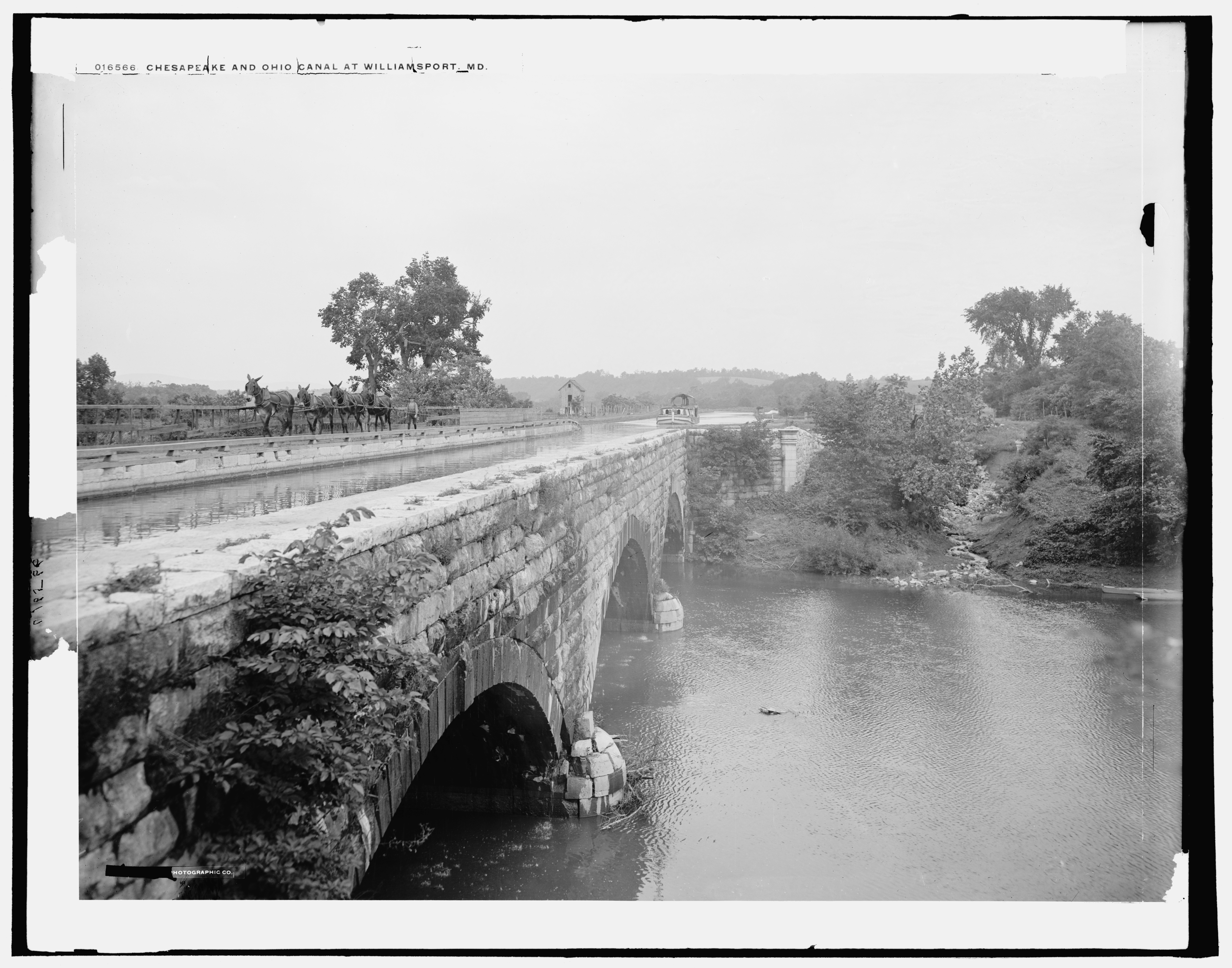
The Conococheague Aqueduct during the canal's operating days, c. 1903, before the wall collapsed.

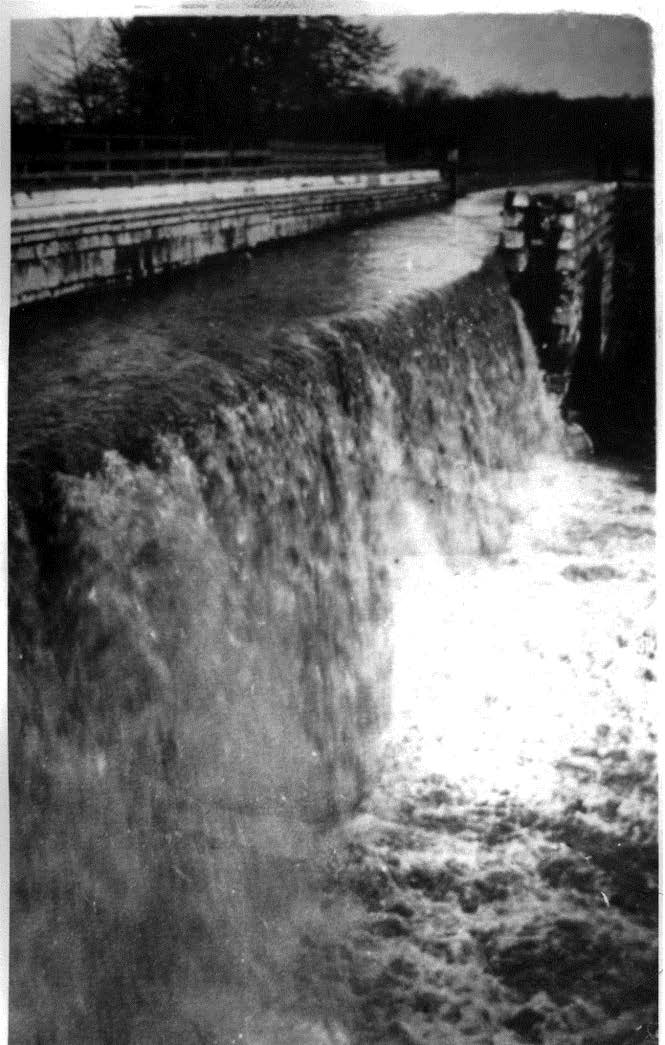
Damaged aqueduct, with water pouring out of the canal, in 1920.

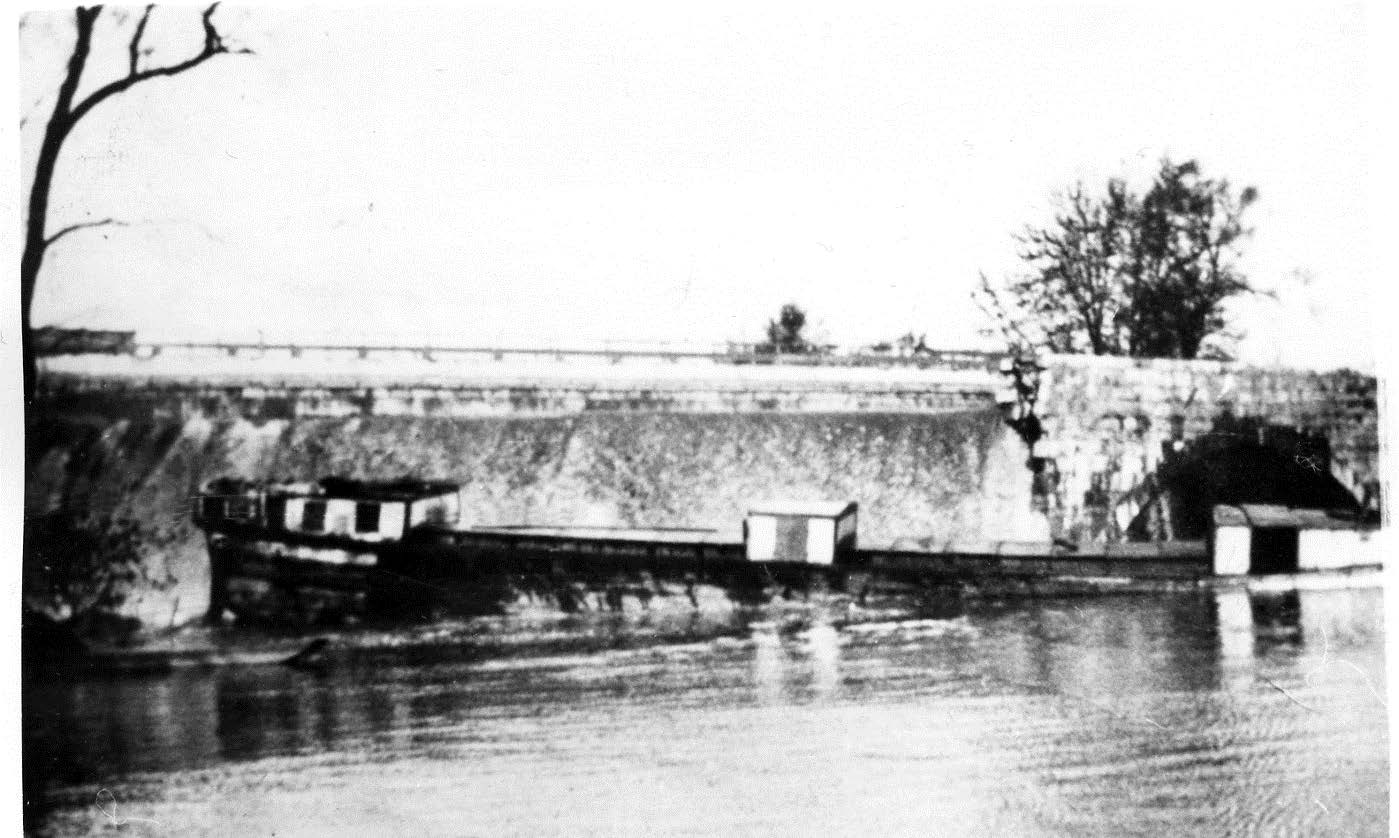
Destroyed aqueduct wall and canal boat in creek

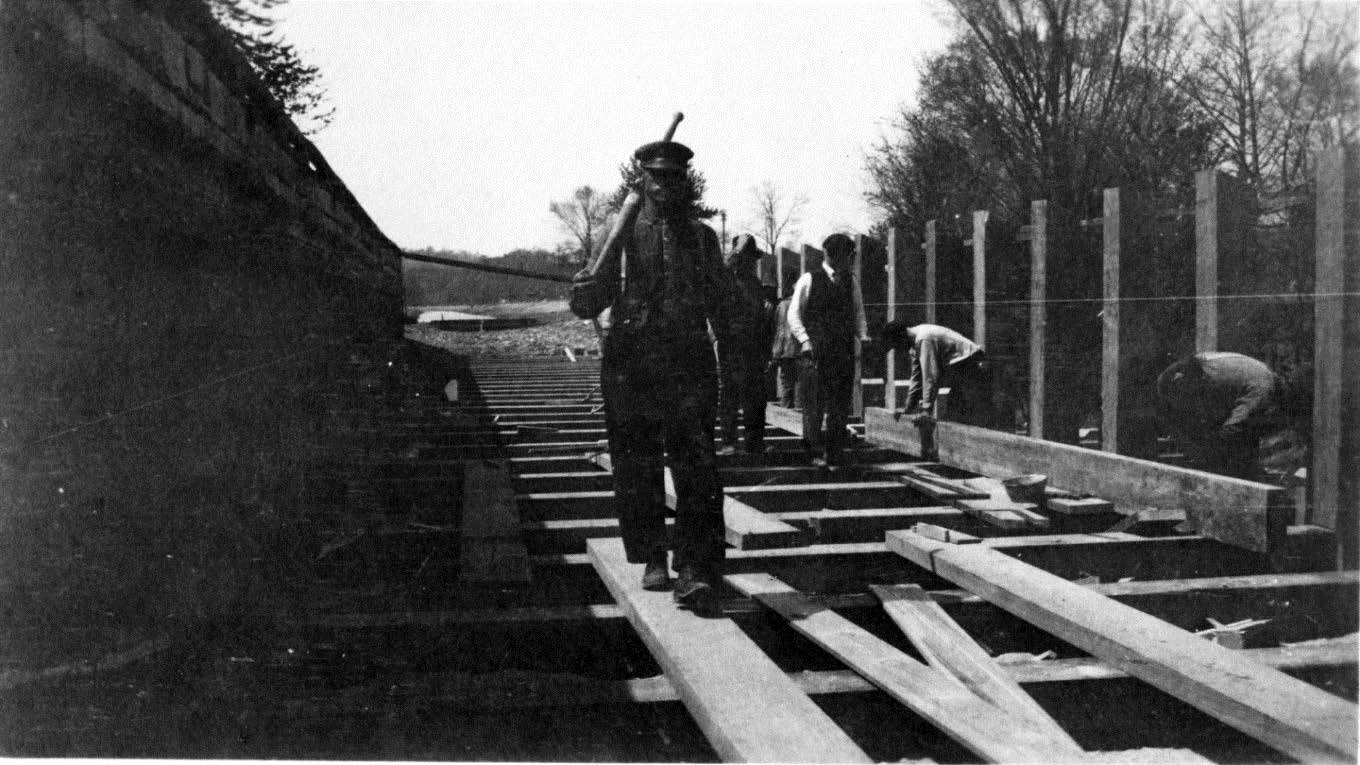
Fixing aqueduct to reopen it in 1920

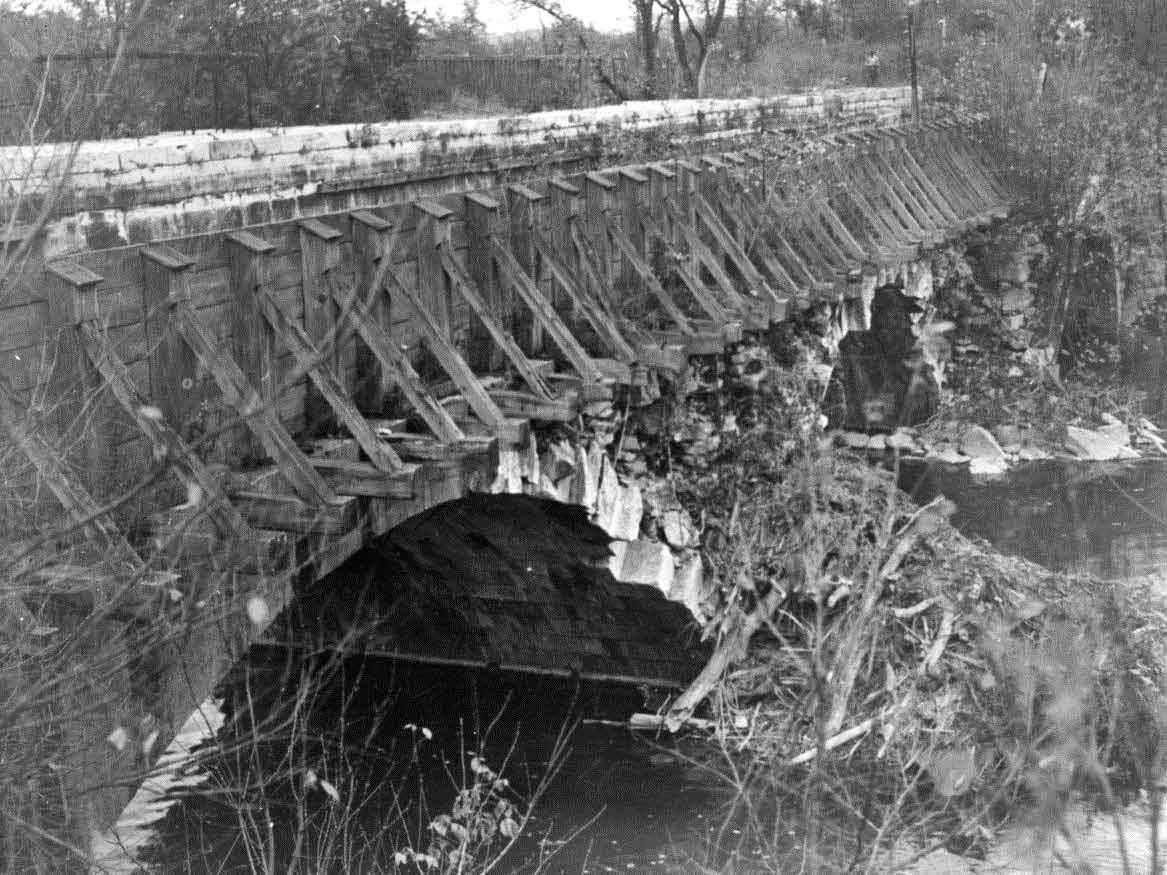
Repaired aqueduct. This is after the canal's closure in 1924

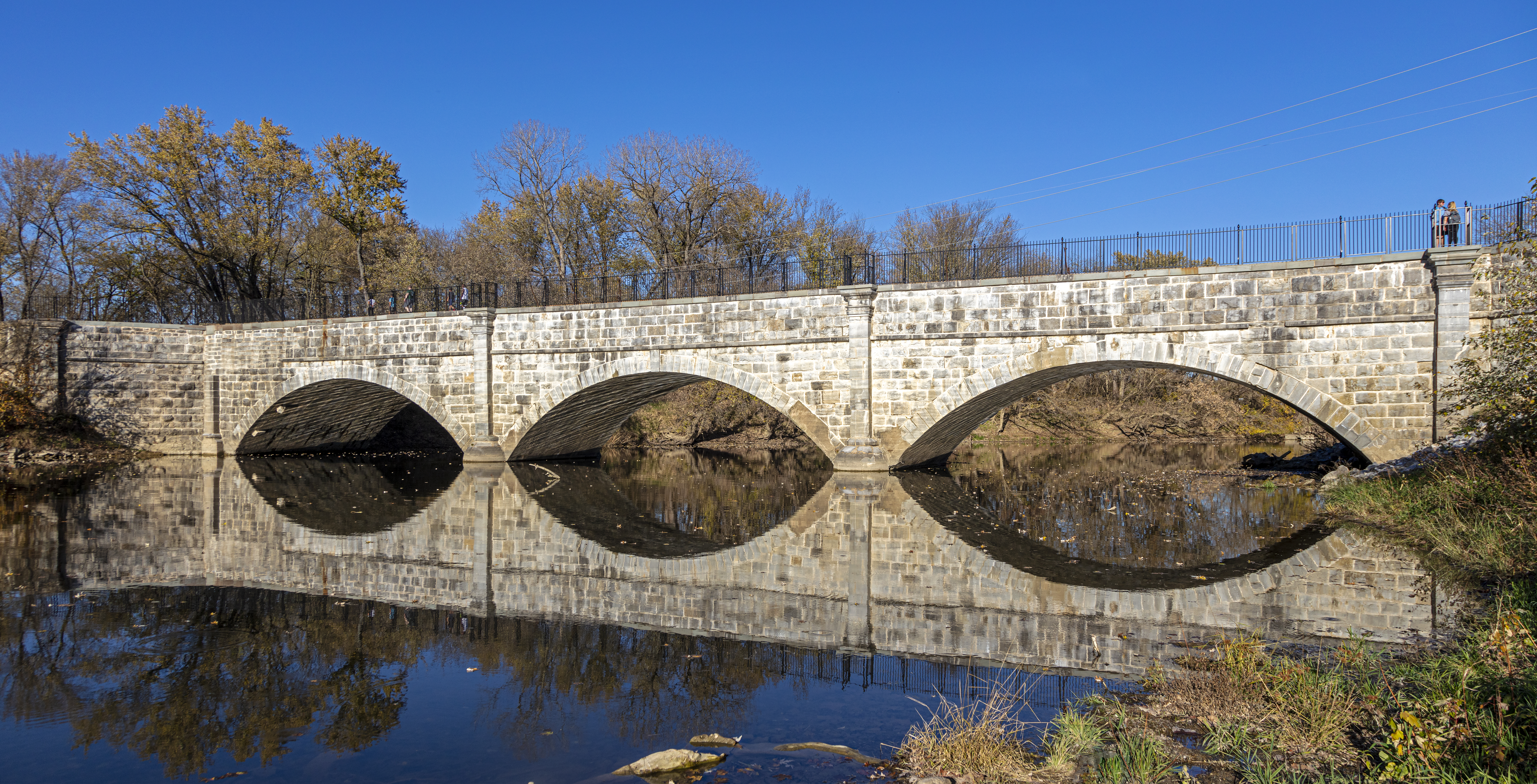
Conococheague Aqueduct in 2020 after restoration

Media related to Conococheague Creek Aqueduct at Wikimedia Commons

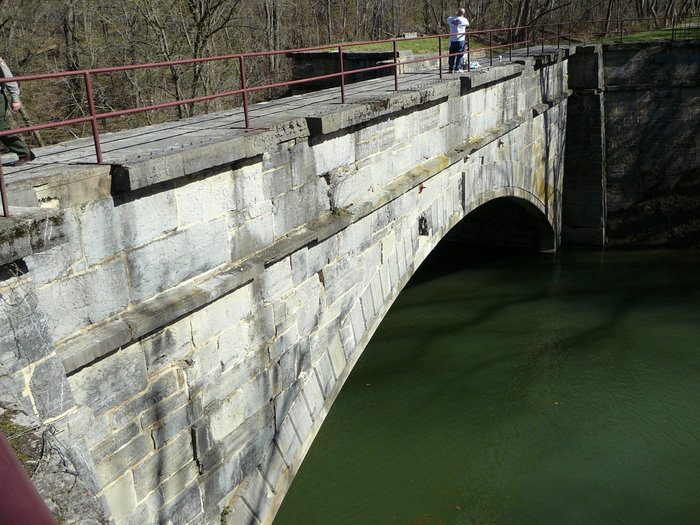
Licking Creek Aqueduct

== Licking Creek Aqueduct ==
The Licking Creek Aqueduct (#6) on section 222 was begun in 1835. In 1837 the contract was reassigned when the original contractor, Holdsworth, died. It was finally completed in May 1938 at the cost of $48,023.85. This is the shortest aqueduct, 50 feet long.

== Tonoloway Creek Aqueduct ==
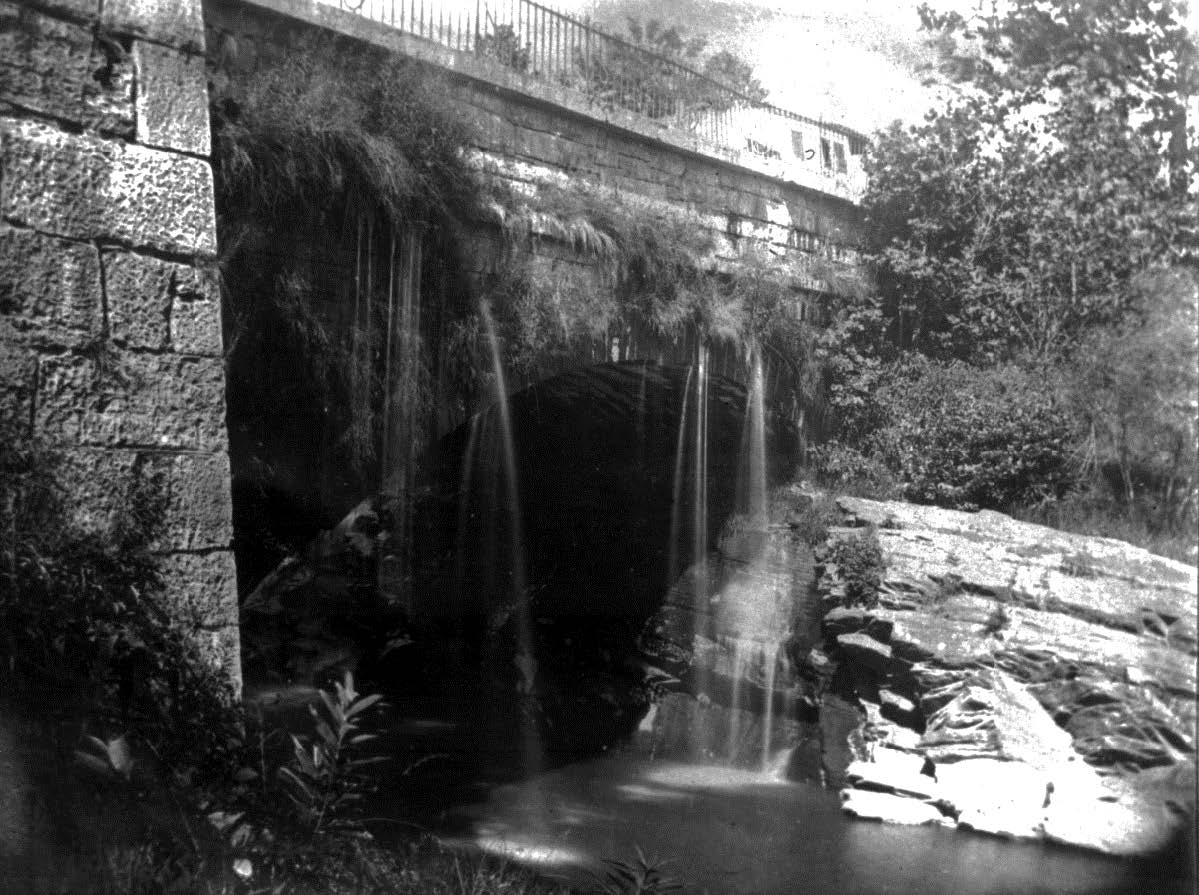
Historical photo of the Tonoloway Aqueduct

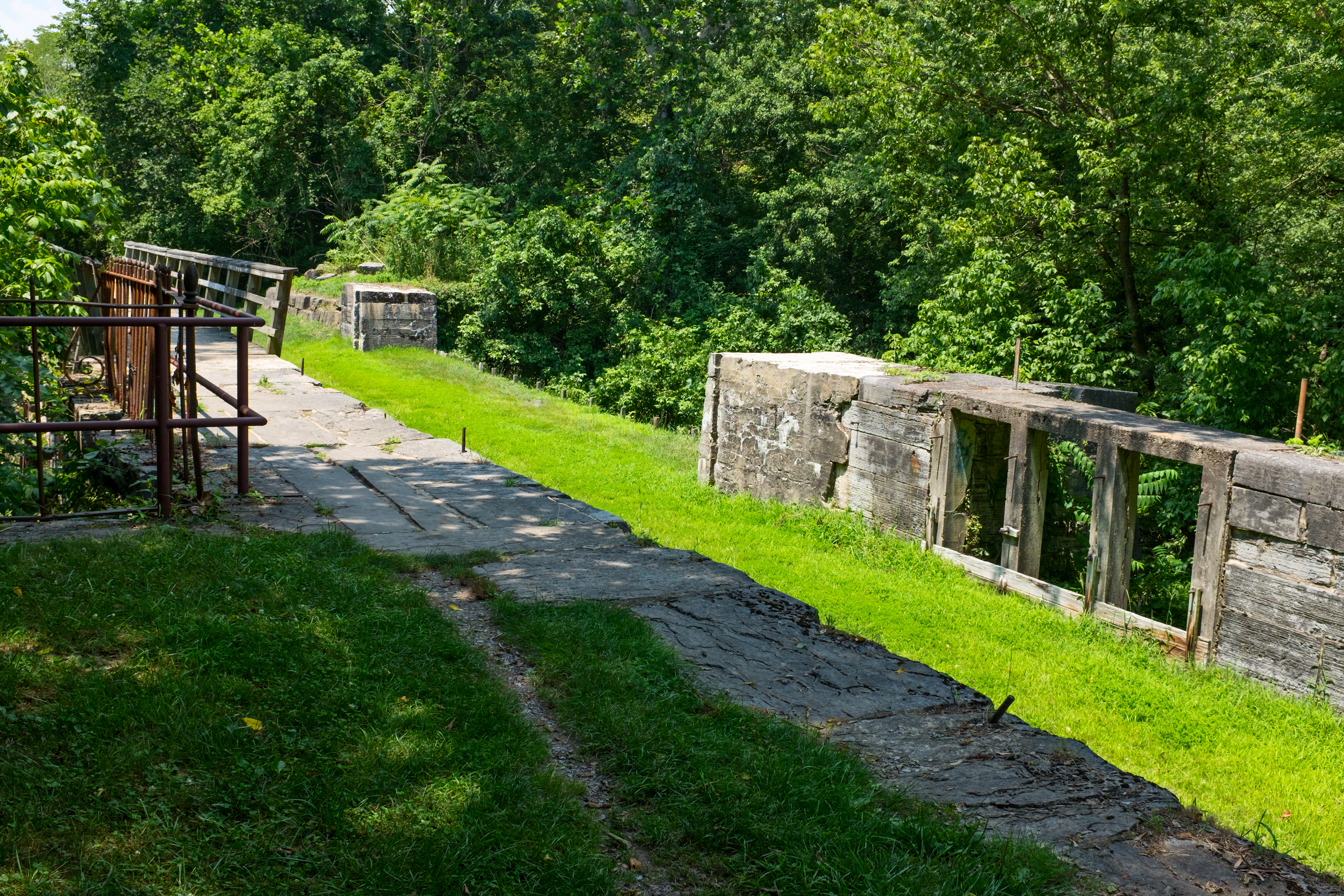
Tonoloway Creek Aqueduct, with waste weir

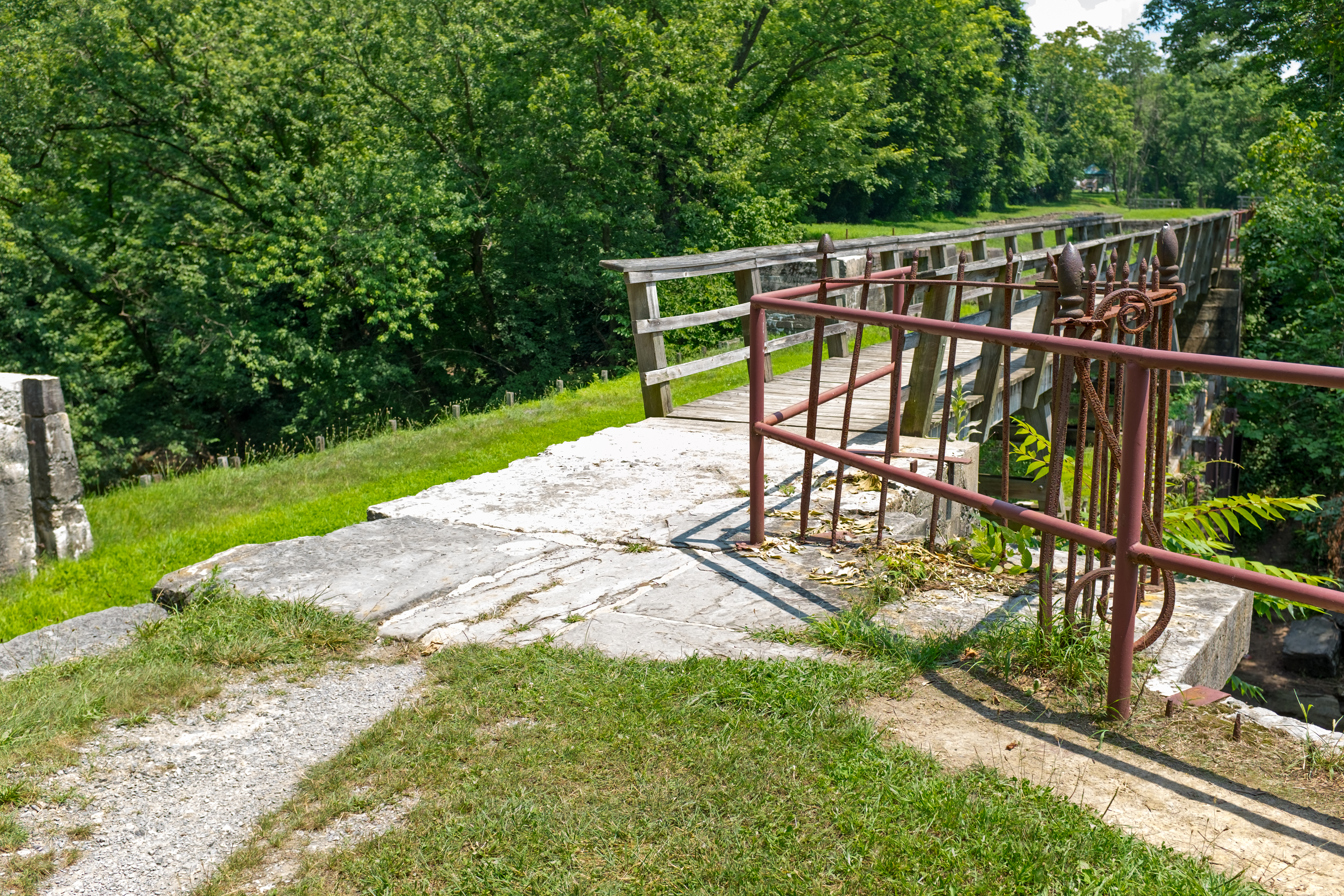
Aqueduct, seen from upstream

Construction on the Tonoloway Creek Aqueduct (#7) began in 1835 and was completed in April 1839. This aqueduct is an incomplete Roman arch; it is incomplete because one end was built into a limestone cliff. Like many other aqueducts, this one has a waste weir as part of the masonry.

== Sideling Hill Creek Aqueduct ==
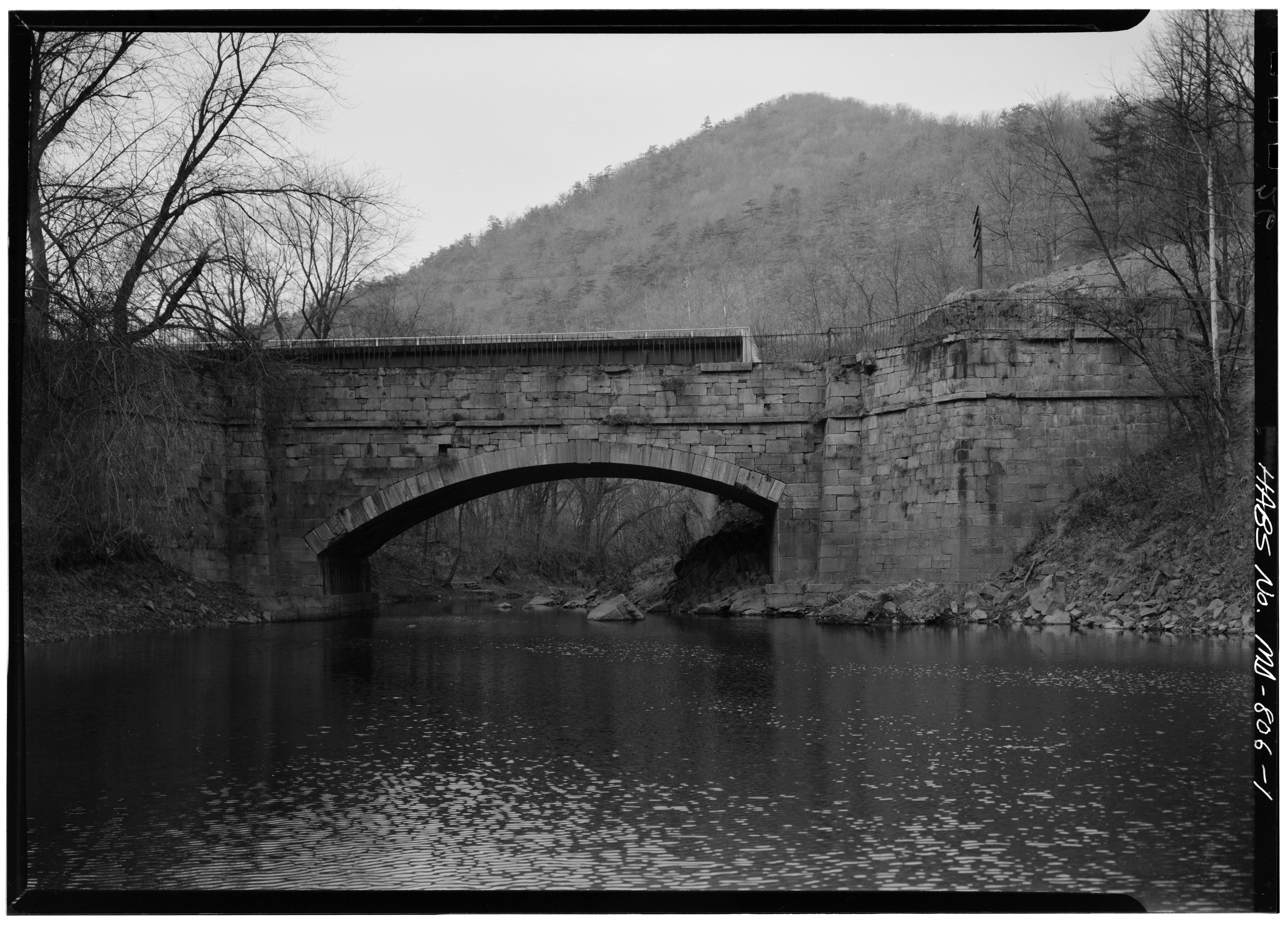
Sidling Creek Aqueduct with Sidling hill in background.

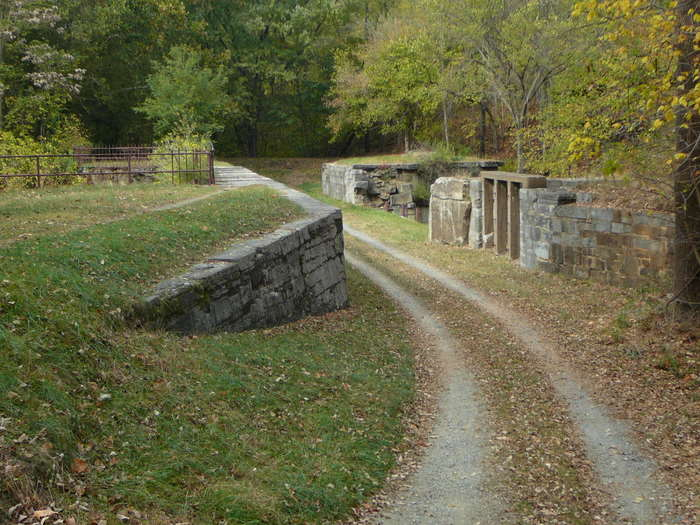
Sidling Creek Aqueduct today.

The Sideling Hill Creek Aqueduct, the ninth of the twelve aqueducts, was built from 1837-1840. The structure spans 70 feet across Sideling Hill Creek, and marks the boundary between Washington and Allegany County.

== Fifteen Mile Creek Aqueduct ==
The Fifteen Mile Creek Aqueduct (#9) was begun in 1838. Contracts were abandoned, work was restarted, and finally was completed in Summer 1850 at a cost of $28,119.51. This aqueduct is just upstream of Little Orleans, Maryland.

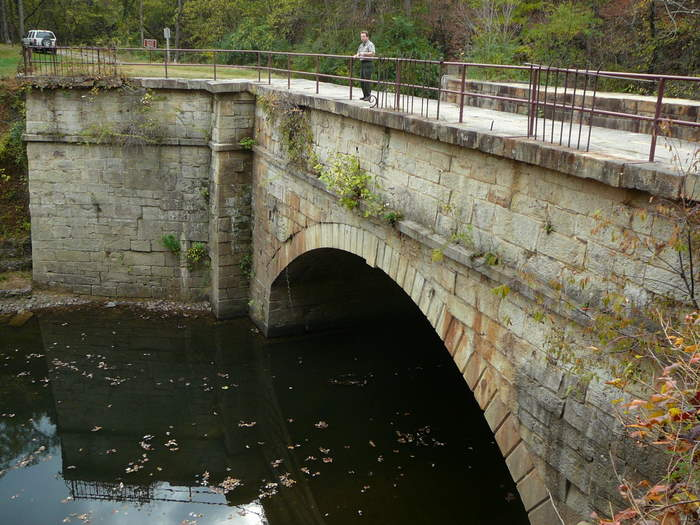
Fifteen Mile Creek Aqueduct

== Town Creek Aqueduct ==
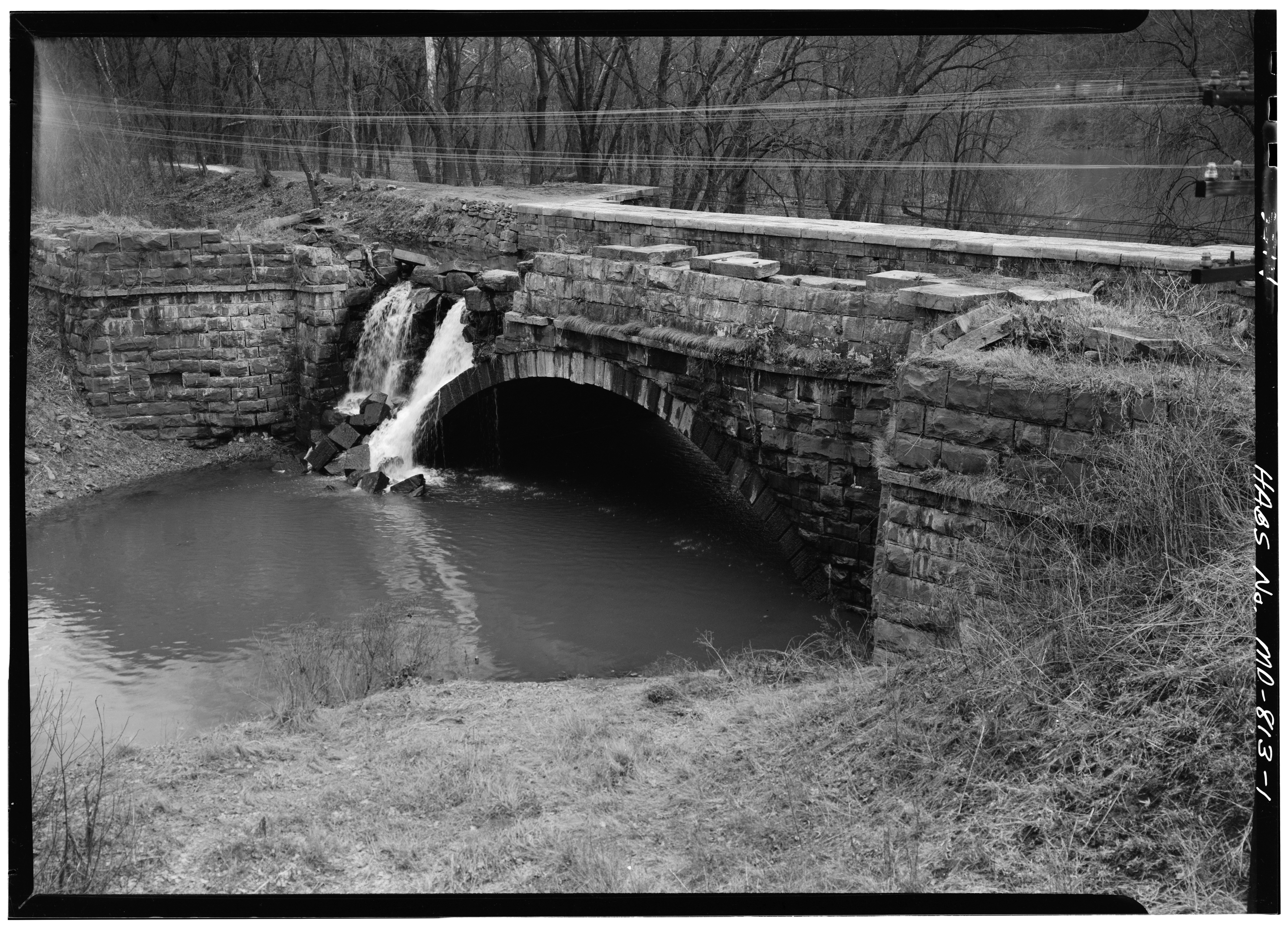
Town Creek Aqueduct.

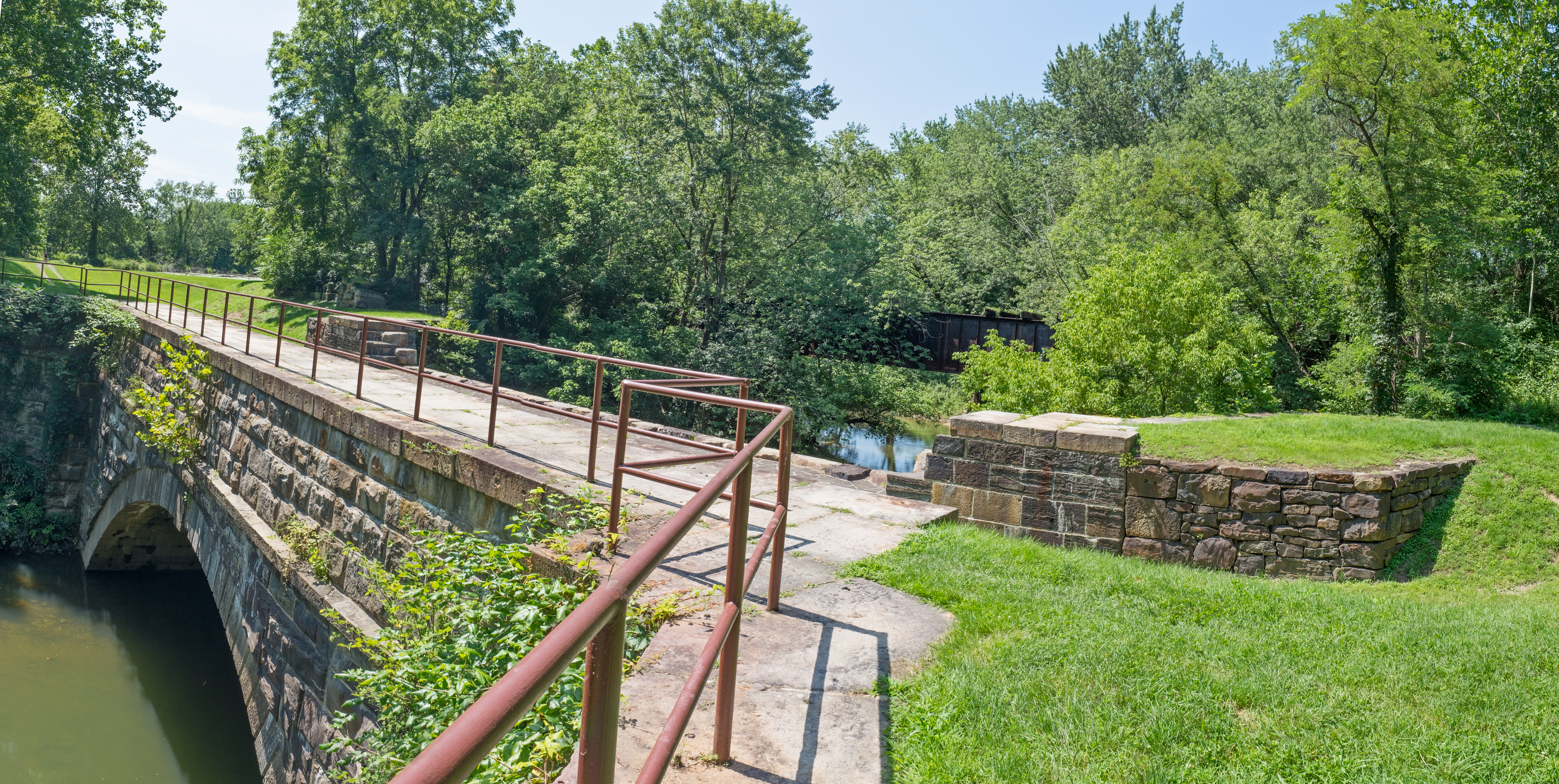
Town Creek Aqueduct Today.

The Town Creek Aqueduct (#10), like the other aqueducts on the last 50 miles (80 km), was begun in 1838, and had the contract abandoned and later another contractor began work (in 1847). It was completed in the Summer of 1850. The Western Maryland Railway constructed a bridge next to this aqueduct.

== Evitts Creek Aqueduct ==
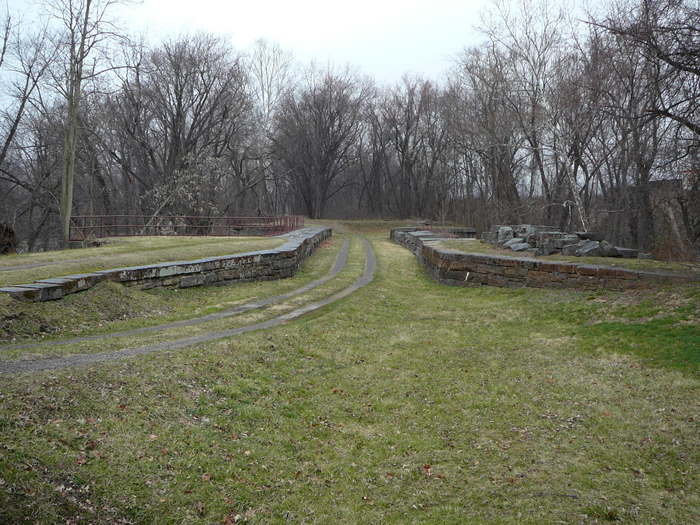
Evitts Creek Aqueduct (recent photo from NPS)

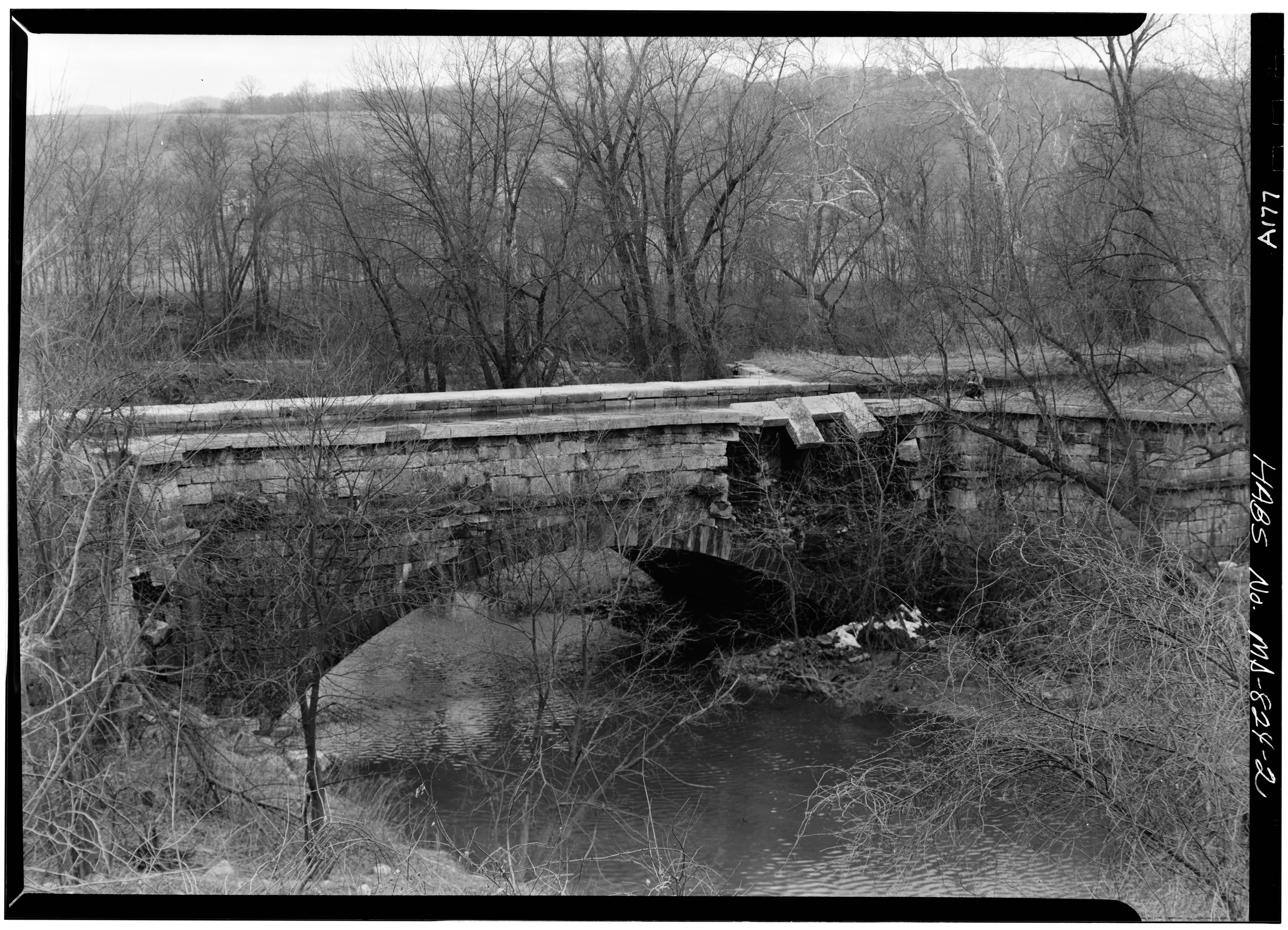
Evitts Creek Aqueduct

The Evitts Creek Aqueduct (#11) was begun in 1838, and finally completed in the Spring of 1850 at a cost of $45,986.00.
