= Walkersville, Maryland =

- Town
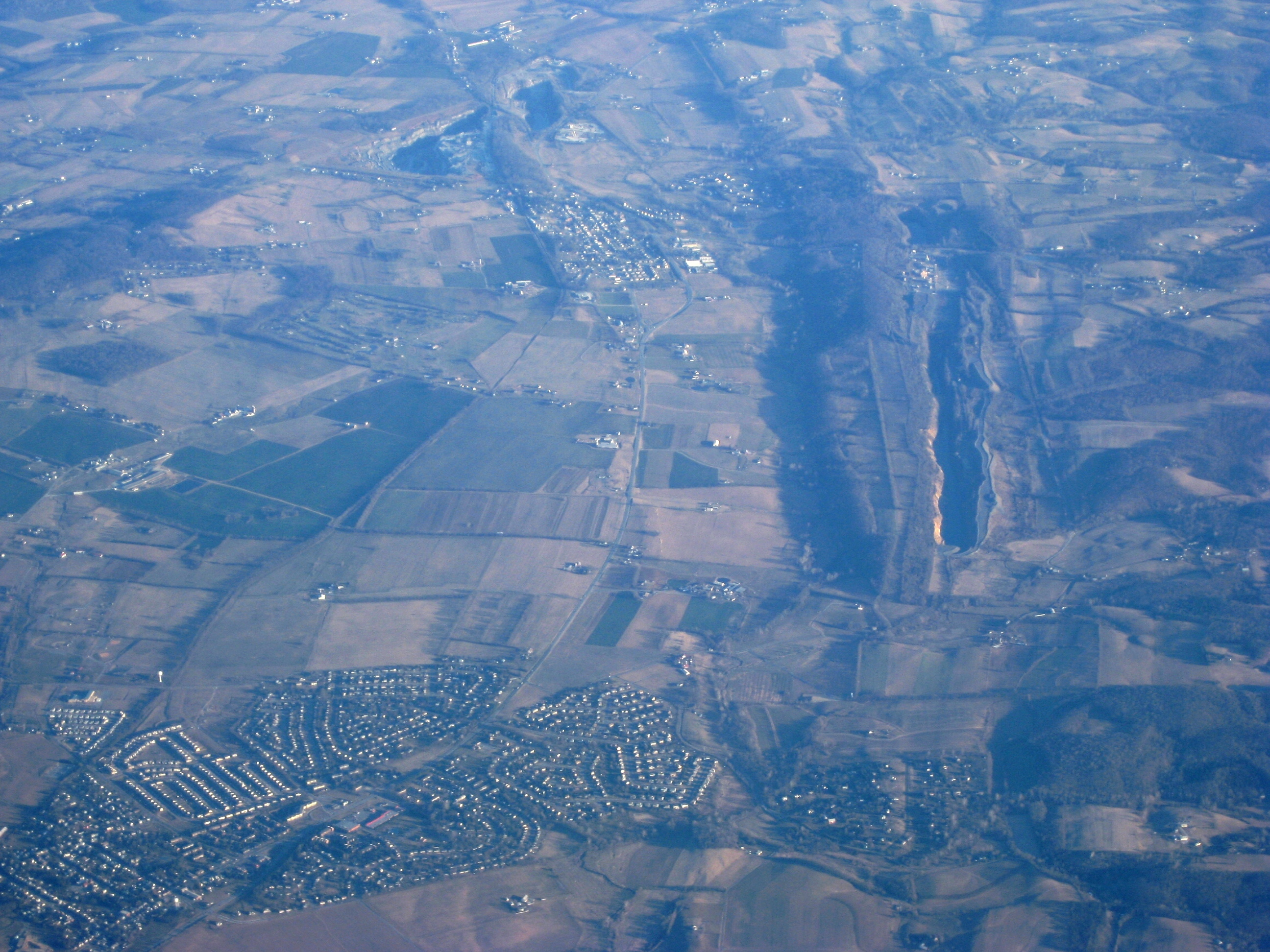
- Aerial photo of Walkersville (in the bottom left)

- Flag Seal

- Location of Walkersville, Maryland
- Coordinates: 39°29′5″N 77°21′56″W
- Country: United States of America
- State: Maryland
- County: Frederick
- Incorporated: 1892

Government
  - Burgess: Chad Weddle

Area
  - Total: 4.76 sq mi (12.34 km^{2})
  - Land: 4.76 sq mi (12.34 km^{2})
  - Water: 0.0039 sq mi (0.01 km^{2})
- Elevation: 302 ft (92 m)

Population (2020)
  - Total: 6,156
  - Density: 1,290/sq mi (499/km^{2})
- Time zone: UTC-5 (Eastern (EST))
  - Summer (DST): UTC-4 (EDT)
- ZIP code: 21793
- Area codes: 301, 240
- FIPS code: 24-81275
- GNIS feature ID: 2391467
- Website: https://www.walkersvillemd.gov/

Walkersville is a town in Frederick County, Maryland, United States. As of the 2020 census, Walkersville had a population of 6,156.

== Geography ==
According to the United States Census Bureau, the town has a total area of 4.36 square miles (11.29 km^{2}), of which 4.35 square miles (11.27 km^{2}) is land and 0.01 square miles (0.03 km^{2}) is water.

== Demographics ==
Historical population
Census	Pop.	Note	%±
1880	160		—
1890	255		59.4%
1900	359		40.8%
1910	582		62.1%
1920	596		2.4%
1930	623		4.5%
1940	731		17.3%
1950	761		4.1%
1960	1,020		34.0%
1970	1,269		24.4%
1980	2,228		75.6%
1990	4,145		86.0%
2000	5,192		25.3%
2010	5,800		11.7%
2020	6,156		6.1%
U.S. Decennial Census

=== 2020 census ===
As of the 2020 census, Walkersville had a population of 6,156. The median age was 40.1 years. 25.2% of residents were under the age of 18 and 16.7% of residents were 65 years of age or older. For every 100 females there were 90.2 males, and for every 100 females age 18 and over there were 86.2 males age 18 and over.

98.7% of residents lived in urban areas, while 1.3% lived in rural areas.

There were 2,181 households in Walkersville, of which 37.5% had children under the age of 18 living in them. Of all households, 60.0% were married-couple households, 11.6% were households with a male householder and no spouse or partner present, and 23.9% were households with a female householder and no spouse or partner present. About 20.6% of all households were made up of individuals and 11.5% had someone living alone who was 65 years of age or older.

There were 2,255 housing units, of which 3.3% were vacant. The homeowner vacancy rate was 1.1% and the rental vacancy rate was 3.0%.

Racial composition as of the 2020 census
Race	Number	Percent
White	4,901	79.6%
Black or African American	356	5.8%
American Indian and Alaska Native	19	0.3%
Asian	186	3.0%
Native Hawaiian and Other Pacific Islander	1	0.0%
Some other race	172	2.8%
Two or more races	521	8.5%
Hispanic or Latino (of any race)	471	7.7%

=== Income and poverty ===
The median income for a household in the town was $65,581, and the median income for a family was $69,476. Males had a median income of $47,309 versus $31,817 for females. The per capita income for the town was $24,103. About 2.1% of families and 2.4% of the population were below the poverty line, including 2.3% of those under age 18 and 4.0% of those age 65 or over.

=== 2010 census ===
As of the census of 2010, there were 5,800 people, 2,094 households, and 1,583 families residing in the town. The population density was 1,333.3 inhabitants per square mile (514.8/km^{2}). There were 2,206 housing units at an average density of 507.1 per square mile (195.8/km^{2}). The racial makeup of the town was 88.0% White, 5.2% African American, 0.3% Native American, 2.4% Asian, 1.5% from other races, and 2.6% from two or more races. Hispanic or Latino of any race were 4.1% of the population.

There were 2,094 households, of which 40.1% had children under the age of 18 living with them, 61.4% were married couples living together, 10.6% had a female householder with no husband present, 3.6% had a male householder with no wife present, and 24.4% were non-families. 21.5% of all households were made up of individuals, and 11.2% had someone living alone who was 65 years of age or older. The average household size was 2.71 and the average family size was 3.16.

The median age in the town was 40.6 years. 26.1% of residents were under the age of 18; 6.9% were between the ages of 18 and 24; 24% were from 25 to 44; 29.9% were from 45 to 64; and 13.3% were 65 years of age or older. The gender makeup of the town was 47.6% male and 52.4% female.

== Arts and culture ==
Sites listed on the National Register of Historic Places include Crum Road Bridge, Harris Farm, and the Woodsboro and Frederick Turnpike Company Tollhouse.

Walkersville fire hall hosts cookouts, auctions, and the annual Volunteer Fire Company Carnival which occurs over the week of July 4.

The Walkersville Southern Railroad offers scenic train rides from May through October. The train was part of the Pennsylvania Railroad that was built in 1872.

== Parks and recreation ==
There are four parks within the local area of Walkersville: Walkersville Community Park, Heritage Farm Park, Creamery Park, and Gilmore C. Trout Memorial Park.

Baseball, softball, soccer and lacrosse fields, playground equipment, a running loop, and covered pavilions are found at Heritage Farm Park. Tennis courts can be found at Walkersville Community Park along with a one-mile paved trail.

== Education ==
Walkersville is in Frederick County Public Schools.

School zoning is as follows: Glade Elementary School and Walkersville Elementary School take different portions of the town in their attendance zones. All residents are zoned to Walkersville Middle School and Walkersville High School. All four schools are in Walkersville.

== Transportation ==
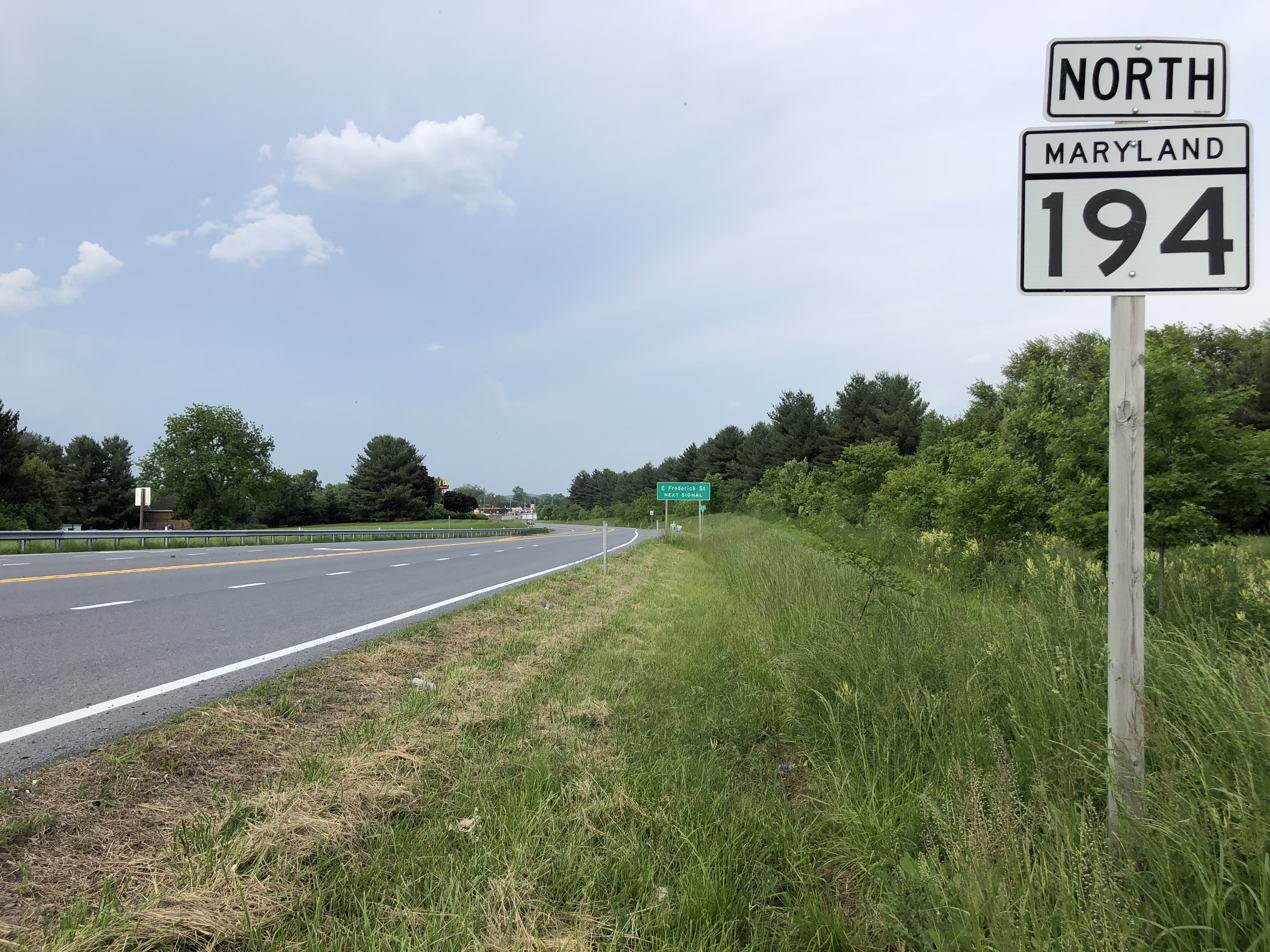
MD 194 northbound in Walkersville

Walkersville is served by Maryland Route 194.

Transit (Frederick County) serves Walkersville by routes 65 and Walkersville Meet-the-MARC.

== Notable people ==
- John D. Nicodemus (1864–1934), member of the Maryland House of Delegates
