= Maryland Route 152 =

State highway in Harford County, Maryland, US

Maryland Route 152
- Maryland Route 152 highlighted in red

Route information
- Maintained by MDSHA
- Length: 17.34 mi (27.91 km)
- Existed: 1927–present

Major junctions
- South end: Aberdeen Proving Ground in Edgewood
- US 40 in Joppatowne; MD 7 in Joppatowne; I-95 near Joppatowne; US 1 in Pleasant Hills; MD 147 in Pleasant Hills; MD 165 in Fallston
- North end: MD 146 near Taylor

Location
- Country: United States
- State: Maryland
- Counties: Harford

Highway system
- Maryland highway system; Interstate; US; State; Scenic Byways
← MD 151	→ MD 155

Maryland Route 152 (MD 152) is a state highway in the US state of Maryland. The state highway runs 17.34 miles (27.91 km) from an entrance to Aberdeen Proving Ground in Edgewood north to MD 146 near Taylor. MD 152 parallels the western edge of Harford County, connecting the communities of Joppatowne and Fallston with Interstate 95 (I-95), U.S. Route 40 (US 40), and US 1. The state highway north of Joppa was mostly built in the late 1920s and early 1930s. MD 152 south of Joppa was built around 1940; shortly thereafter, the highway was reconstructed as a wartime access project. The state highway originally had only a partial interchange with I-95; it was expanded to full interchange in the mid 1990s concurrent with the expansion of the highway to a four-lane divided highway through Joppa.

== Route description ==
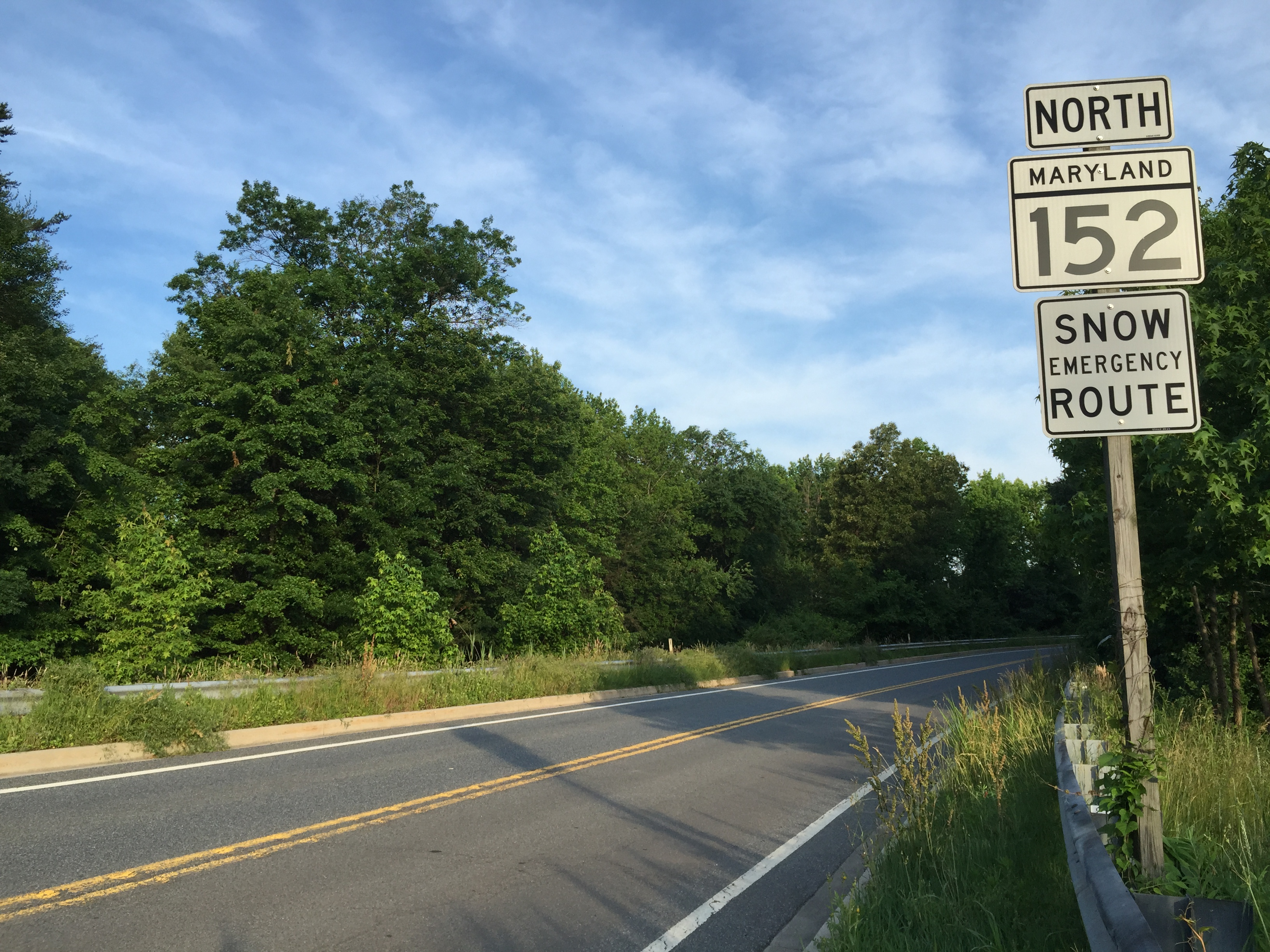
View north from the south end of MD 152 at the Aberdeen Proving Ground in Edgewood

MD 152 begins at an entrance to the Edgewood Area of Aberdeen Proving Ground. The state highway heads north as two-lane undivided Magnolia Road and crosses over Amtrak's Northeast Corridor railroad line and MARC's Penn Line. MD 152 passes through the community of Magnolia, where the highway intersects Trimble Road, which connects the community with Edgewood to the east and Joppatowne to the west. The state highway expands to a four-lane divided highway ahead of its intersection with US 40 (Pulaski Highway), where the highway's name changes to Mountain Road. MD 152 crosses over CSX's Philadelphia Subdivision railroad line to arrive in the community of Joppa, where the highway is paralleled to the west by its old alignment, Old Mountain Road South. The state highway intersects MD 7 (Philadelphia Road) before meeting I-95 (John F. Kennedy Memorial Highway) at a diamond interchange. The interchange ramp from northbound I-95 intersects the old alignment, with a park and ride lot located in the southwest quadrant of the interchange.

North of I-95, MD 152 receives the northern end of Old Mountain Road South and reduces to a two-lane undivided road to pass through the hamlet of Clayton. The state highway, which is paralleled on the east by another loop of old alignment, Old Mountain Road Central, has many sections of three-lane road with a center left-turn lane on its way northwest to Fallston. The state highway intersects Singer Road and Jerusalem Road in the village of Mountain. Singer Road heads east past the historic school McComas Institute; Jerusalem Road heads west to Jerusalem, a village within Gunpowder Falls State Park on Little Gunpowder Falls that contains the Jerusalem Mill Village and the Jericho Farm, which are connected by the Jericho Covered Bridge. Through the hamlet of Stockton, MD 152 is paralleled to the west by Old Mountain Road North and intersects Old Joppa Road, which heads northeast toward Bel Air providing access to the historic farm Olney and the Norris-Stirling House.

Old Mountain Road North returns to the route, where a park and ride lot serving MTA Maryland commuter buses is located west of the road. MD 152 enters the community of Pleasant Hills, where it expands to a four-lane divided highway and intersects US 1 (Belair Road) and MD 147 (Harford Road) in commercial areas in the hamlets of Lynchs Corner and Bagley, respectively. MD 152 passes east of a park and ride lot that serves MTA Maryland commuter buses and continues northwest as two-lane Fallston Road into Fallston. Old Fallston Road splits to the west; the old alignment provides access to the Little Falls Meetinghouse, the historic home Bon Air, and Fallston Airport. MD 152 veers more toward the west at its intersection with the old alignment and Carrs Mill Road, which leads to the historic home Rockdale. As the state highway passes through the hamlet of Scarff, its surroundings transition from suburban residential development to farmland. MD 152 intersects MD 165 (Baldwin Mill Road) in the community of Upper Crossroads, then veers north at its junction with Hess Road in the hamlet of Rutledge. The state highway reaches its northern terminus at MD 146 (Jarrettsville Pike) near Taylor.

MD 152 is a part of the National Highway System as a principal arterial from US 40 to I-95 in Joppatowne and from Singer Road south of Pleasant Hills to Pleasantville Road near Fallston.

== History ==
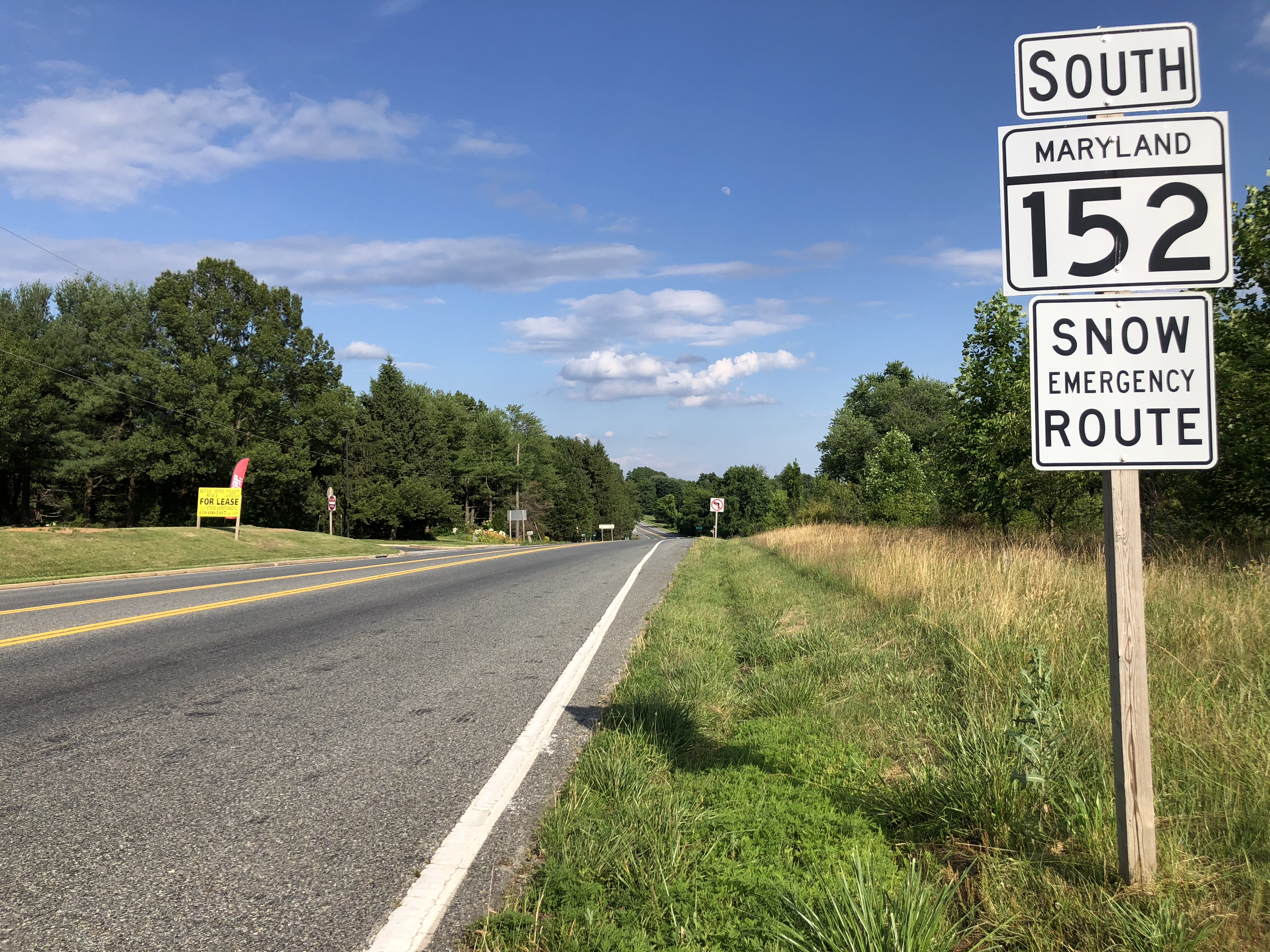
MD 152 southbound past MD 165 in Fallston

The first section of MD 152 was constructed as a macadam road from the Maryland and Pennsylvania Railroad crossing just north of Watervale Road in Fallston to Pleasantville Road in Scarff by 1910. The paved highway was extended north to Rutledge in 1928. The segment from Fallston to MD 147 at Bagley, which was a county highway in 1930, was resurfaced in macadam in 1932. MD 152 was paved in macadam from US 40 (now MD 7) in Joppa north to Bagley in 1932 and 1933. The state highway was extended north from Rutledge to MD 146 near Taylor in 1938.

A disjoint segment of MD 152 was constructed from US 40 south to Magnolia in 1940. At its southern end, instead of continuing southeast across the Pennsylvania Railroad (now Amtrak), the state highway curved to the southwest along what is now Fort Hoyle Road to end where Fort Hoyle Road turns north. Only two years later, the southern segment of MD 152 was widened and resurfaced as a military access project. A bridge over the railroad was constructed as part of a new alignment built starting in 1942 to provide better access to the Edgewood Arsenal; the project was completed by 1944. The gap in MD 152 was filled in 1951 when the highway between US 40 and MD 7 was brought into the state highway system.

MD 152 was widened, resurfaced, and relocated, leaving behind several sections of old alignment, for most of its length in the late 1950s. The highway was reconstructed between Rutledge and Fallston starting in 1957 and from Fallston to Stockton beginning in 1958. MD 152 was expanded to a four-lane divided highway from south of US 1 to north of MD 147 in 1964. When I-95 was constructed northeast of Baltimore in 1963, a half-interchange was constructed with MD 152, with entrance to I-95 southbound and exit from it northbound. The I-95–MD 152 interchange, originally partial, was expanded with ramps from southbound I-95 to MD 152 and from MD 152 to northbound I-95 in 1994. MD 152 was also expanded to a divided highway from south of MD 7 to north of the I-95 interchange and around the US 40 intersection in 1994. The gap in divided highway between US 40 and MD 7 was filled when the highway's bridge over CSX's Philadelphia Subdivision was reconstructed in 1996.

== Junction list ==
The entire route is in Harford County.

Location	mi	km	Destinations	Notes
Edgewood	0.00	0.00	Entrance to Aberdeen Proving Ground	Southern terminus
Joppatowne	2.38	3.83	US 40 (Pulaski Highway) – Joppatowne, Aberdeen	
Joppatowne	2.97	4.78	MD 7 (Philadelphia Road) – Bradshaw, Abingdon	
Joppatowne	3.30	5.31	I-95 (John F. Kennedy Memorial Highway) – Baltimore, New York	I-95 Exit 74
Pleasant Hills	7.55	12.15	US 1 (Bel Air Road) – Perry Hall, Bel Air	
Pleasant Hills	8.03	12.92	MD 147 (Harford Road) – Carney, Bel Air	
Fallston	13.35	21.48	MD 165 (Baldwin Mill Road) – Baldwin, Jarrettsville	
Taylor	17.34	27.91	MD 146 (Jarrettsville Pike) – Jacksonville, Jarrettsville	Northern terminus
1.000 mi = 1.609 km; 1.000 km = 0.621 mi

== Auxiliary routes ==
- MD 152A is the designation for the unnamed 0.09-mile (0.14 km) section of old alignment of MD 152 just east of the state highway's northern terminus at MD 146 near Taylor. MD 152A was designated between 1982 and 1994 after the MD 146–MD 152 intersection was reconstructed from an oblique geometry to perpendicular.
- MD 152B is the designation for the 0.22-mile (0.35 km) section of Jaycee Drive that heads east from MD 152's intersection with Old Mountain Road South just north of the state highway's interchange with I-95 near Joppatowne. The service road, which was constructed concurrent with the expansion of MD 152's interchange with I-95 around 1994, is maintained by the Maryland Transportation Authority.
