= Pleasant Hills, Maryland =

- Census-designated place
- Location of Pleasant Hills, Maryland
- Coordinates: 39°29′8″N 76°23′40″W
- Country: United States
- State: Maryland
- County: Harford

Area
  - Total: 4.37 sq mi (11.32 km^{2})
  - Land: 4.36 sq mi (11.29 km^{2})
  - Water: 0.0077 sq mi (0.02 km^{2})
- Elevation: 410 ft (125 m)

Population (2020)
  - Total: 3,998
  - Density: 917.0/sq mi (354.05/km^{2})
- Time zone: UTC−5 (Eastern (EST))
  - Summer (DST): UTC−4 (EDT)
- FIPS code: 24-62175
- GNIS feature ID: 1698807

Pleasant Hills is a census-designated place (CDP) in Harford County, Maryland, United States. The population was 3,379 at the 2010 census, up from 2,851 in 2000. There is no post office with the designation "Pleasant Hills"; most of the residents have either Fallston or Kingsville addresses and consider themselves as belonging to those communities.

== Geography ==
Pleasant Hills is located in southwestern Harford County at 39°29′08″N 76°23′40″W. It is bordered to the southwest by Baltimore County, with the county border following the Little Gunpowder Falls. Maryland Route 147 (Harford Road) forms the northwestern edge of the CDP. U.S. Route 1 (Bel Air Road) runs through the community, leading northeast 4 miles (6 km) to Bel Air, the Harford County seat, and southwest 18 miles (29 km) to Baltimore. Maryland Route 152 crosses US 1 in Pleasant Hills, leading northwest 2 miles (3 km) to Fallston and southeast 4 miles (6 km) to Interstate 95 near Joppatowne.

According to the United States Census Bureau, the Pleasant Hills CDP has a total area of 4.4 square miles (11.3 km^{2}), of which 0.01 square miles (0.02 km^{2}), or 0.22%, are water.

== Demographics ==
Historical population
Census	Pop.	Note	%±
2000	2,851		—
2010	3,379		18.5%
2020	3,998		18.3%
U.S. Decennial Census

=== 2020 census ===
As of the 2020 census, Pleasant Hills had a population of 3,998. The median age was 48.2 years. 20.6% of residents were under the age of 18 and 23.4% of residents were 65 years of age or older. For every 100 females there were 96.2 males, and for every 100 females age 18 and over there were 94.4 males age 18 and over.

93.8% of residents lived in urban areas, while 6.2% lived in rural areas.

There were 1,453 households in Pleasant Hills, of which 30.3% had children under the age of 18 living in them. Of all households, 69.5% were married-couple households, 9.1% were households with a male householder and no spouse or partner present, and 17.4% were households with a female householder and no spouse or partner present. About 14.9% of all households were made up of individuals and 10.7% had someone living alone who was 65 years of age or older.

There were 1,505 housing units, of which 3.5% were vacant. The homeowner vacancy rate was 0.9% and the rental vacancy rate was 4.5%.

Racial composition as of the 2020 census
Race	Number	Percent
White	3,441	86.1%
Black or African American	133	3.3%
American Indian and Alaska Native	7	0.2%
Asian	163	4.1%
Native Hawaiian and Other Pacific Islander	0	0.0%
Some other race	32	0.8%
Two or more races	222	5.6%
Hispanic or Latino (of any race)	127	3.2%

=== 2000 census ===
As of the census of 2000, there were 2,851 people, 1,026 households, and 854 families residing in the CDP. The population density was 652.0 inhabitants per square mile (251.7/km^{2}). There were 1,053 housing units at an average density of 240.8 per square mile (93.0/km^{2}). The racial makeup of the CDP was 96.28% White, 1.19% African American, 0.14% Native American, 1.19% Asian, 0.25% from other races, and 0.95% from two or more races. Hispanic or Latino of any race were 1.05% of the population.

There were 1,026 households, out of which 33.6% had children under the age of 18 living with them, 74.6% were married couples living together, 5.9% had a female householder with no husband present, and 16.7% were non-families. 14.0% of all households were made up of individuals, and 7.8% had someone living alone who was 65 years of age or older. The average household size was 2.78 and the average family size was 3.07.

In the CDP, the population was spread out, with 24.3% under the age of 18, 5.3% from 18 to 24, 26.2% from 25 to 44, 27.4% from 45 to 64, and 16.8% who were 65 years of age or older. The median age was 42 years. For every 100 females, there were 98.5 males. For every 100 females age 18 and over, there were 94.9 males.

The median income for a household in the CDP was $63,351, and the median income for a family was $65,679. Males had a median income of $51,566 versus $31,857 for females. The per capita income for the CDP was $26,435. About 3.4% of families and 2.8% of the population were below the poverty line, including 2.2% of those under age 18 and 5.3% of those age 65 or over.
