= Clayton, Maryland =

Unincorporated community in Maryland, United States

- Unincorporated community
- Location within Maryland Location within the United States
- Coordinates: 39°27′01″N 76°21′17″W
- Country: United States
- State: Maryland
- County: Harford
- Elevation: 177 ft (54 m)
- Time zone: UTC-5 (Eastern (EST))
  - Summer (DST): UTC-4 (EDT)
- Area codes: 410 & 443
- GNIS feature ID: 589984

Clayton is an unincorporated community in Harford County, Maryland, United States. Clayton is located on Maryland Route 152, 4 miles (6.4 km) northwest of Edgewood.
