= Martha Ellicott Tyson =

American activist (1795–1873)

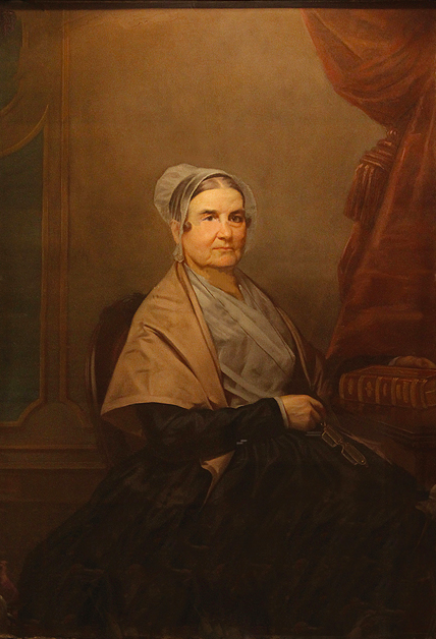
- Martha Ellicott Tyson (1795-1873), Quaker elder, co-founder of Swarthmore College, and author
- Born: September 13, 1795; Ellicott's Mills, Maryland, US
- Died: March 5, 1873 (aged 77); Baltimore, Maryland, US
- Resting place: Green Mount Cemetery, Baltimore, Maryland
- Spouse(s): Nathan Tyson, son of Elisha Tyson
- Children: 12
- Parent(s): George and Elizabeth (Brooke) Ellicott

Martha Ellicott Tyson (September 13, 1795 – March 5, 1873) was an Elder of the Quaker Meeting in Baltimore, an anti-slavery and women's rights advocate, historian, and a co-founder of Swarthmore College. She was married to Nathan Tyson, a merchant whose father was the emancipator and abolitionist Elisha Tyson. She was the great-great-grandmother of Maryland state senator James A. Clark Jr. (1918–2006). She was inducted into the Maryland Women's Hall of Fame in 1988.

== Early life and education ==
Martha was born on September 13, 1795, to George Ellicott and Elizabeth (Brooke) Ellicott, who were members of a respected family of Maryland Quakers, the Ellicotts. The family homestead was a stone house built in 1789 near the Patapsco River and the family's mill. Her father often welcomed Native Americans to their home.

One of seven children, Martha was born and raised in Ellicott's Mills (now Ellicott City, Maryland), which her grandfather, Andrew Ellicott and his brothers had founded. Her books recounted a Christmas visit with chief Little Turtle in 1807 when she was twelve years old. Although she never completed formal schooling past primary education, she was well educated at home and fluent in French.

== Marriage and children ==
In 1815, Martha married Nathan Tyson, the son of a Baltimore Quaker and abolitionist Elisha Tyson. During his lifetime, Nathan Tyson served as the Baltimore Chamber of Commerce's first president and as the first president of the Baltimore Corn and Flour Exchange. He had a "gracious love story" with his wife and they had a relaxed attitude about some Quaker conventions. (Note: Throughout every spring, he picked crocus flowers and presented them to her. It was said that "Wherever you find a descendant of Martha Ellicott Tyson you will find one who cherishes the crocus." She met Nathan, eight years her senior, at the Friend's school at Ellicott's Mill. He was charmed by her and asked her over their childhood to marry him. When she was 20 years of age, she said yes. When they had the ceremony to read the bans, followed by their marriage, she wore beautiful clothing rather than the plain garb of the Quakers and had an elaborate wedding.) Tyson was described as a "woman of much sweetness and dignity of bearing, possessed of an exceedingly cultivated mind and many accomplishments."

The couple had twelve children, ten of whom reached adulthood and eight of whom reached middle-age. Their children included James Tyson (died by or in early 1905), Elizabeth Brooke Tyson Smith, Henry Tyson, Isabella (died by 1905), Frederic Tyson, Robert Tyson, Lucy Tyson Fitzhugh and Anne Tyson Kirk. Tyson ensured that both her sons and daughters received a good education.

Nathan died on January 6, 1867, and his funeral was held January 9, 1867. Leaders of the Baltimore Corn and Flour Exchange said of him, "the deceased presented to us, in his daily conduct, his known integrity, his uniform courtesy and goodness of heart".

== Quaker abolitionist and educator ==
Martha was a member of the Little Falls Meetinghouse in Harford County. At the age of 35, Tyson was chosen as an Elder of the Baltimore Quaker Meeting. When she was 66, she was appointed as a minister, although she had been working in that capacity informally for years. Tyson worked to improve educational opportunities for enslaved people and women and, with her husband, helped found the Fallston Public Library. At her suggestion, a committee on education was established at the Baltimore Yearly Meeting to prepare teachers and to focus on higher education of Quaker children. She was an abolitionist.

== Swarthmore College ==
As a result of her dedication, support and interest in education, Martha became a co-founder of Swarthmore College. She had tried unsuccessfully for ten years to found a college. Martha and her husband tried a new approach when they hosted a meeting in their home of Quaker leaders from New York, Pennsylvania, and Maryland. This meeting of 30 leaders propelled the movement to start the second coeducation college in the United States, providing new educational opportunities for women.

Founded in 1860 just prior to the American Civil War, Swarthmore College was established to provide: "A better educated generation that could achieve freedom, peace, prosperity, and righteousness." Martha, who was a member of the college's Board of Managers, recruited for women professors by writing a letter to the president of Vassar College in 1863 that encouraged the hiring of women professors at the new institution. The college opened after the War in 1869.

== Author and editor ==
Martha authored two biographical accounts of Benjamin Banneker, a free African-American farmer who became an almanac author and surveyor and acquired knowledge of astronomy, mathematics and natural history. Banneker was a frequent visitor at Martha's childhood home, sharing a mutual enthusiasm for learning with the family. Martha's father, George Ellicott, befriended and mentored Banneker, who lived a 1 mile (1.6 km) up a hill from the Ellicotts in what is now Oella, Maryland.

Martha was eleven years old when Banneker died. She conducted interviews and compiled the materials for her two biographies, the second of which was edited by her daughter Anne Tyson Kirk, who sought advice from Frederick Douglass. The two biographies of Banneker are Sketch in the Life of Benjamin Banneker, published in 1854, and the more complete Benjamin Banneker: The African-American Astronomer, published posthumously in 1884.

Martha also wrote A Brief Account of the Settlement of Ellicott's Mills and was a co-author, with Charles Worthington Evans and G. Hunter Bartlett, of American Family History: Fox, Ellicott, Evans. She also wrote memoirs of family members, including one of Joseph Ellicott that the Maryland Historical Society printed.

Encouraged by the Baltimore Yearly Meeting of Friends, Martha's father and Gerard T. Hopkins went to Fort Wayne, then part of the Northwest Territory, to meet with Native Americans. Hopkins kept a journal of the details of the trip, which Martha edited in 1862. She also wrote about the meetings that her father held with the United States government to discuss Native Americans.

== Death and legacy ==
After experiencing declining health for about three months, Martha died on March 5, 1873, at the age of 77 years while surrounded by family members. She was buried at Green Mount Cemetery in Baltimore.

In 1910, John Russell Hayes wrote a poem entitled A Portrait of Martha Ellicott Tyson, which memorialized a work of art hanging on a wall at Swarthmore College. Martha was inducted into the Maryland Women's Hall of Fame in 1988.

Martha Ellicott Tyson came from a tradition that encouraged and appreciated the intellectual accomplishments of the family's women. During her life, Tyson, continued to encourage and support the rights of women and slaves to achieve the freedom necessary to reach their full potential. As a pioneering spiritual leader and minister of the Society of Friends, her life was moved by a desire to do good.

— Maryland Women's Hall of Fame
