= Nathan Tyson (disambiguation) =

Nathan Tyson (born 1982) is an English professional footballer.

Nathan Tyson may also refer to:

- Nathan Tyson (Quaker) (died 1867), Baltimore Quaker merchant and husband of Martha Ellicott Tyson
- Nathan Tyson (Neighbours), a fictional character on the Australian television series Neighbours

== See also ==
- Nathan Tysen (born 1977), an award-winning songwriter and Broadway lyricist
