= Anime Classics Zettai! =

2007 anime encyclopedia

Anime Classics Zettai!: 100 Must-See Japanese Animation Masterpieces
- Cover of Anime Classics Zettai!: 100 Must-See Japanese Animation Masterpieces
- Author: Brian Camp; Julie Davis
- Language: English
- Subject: Anime
- Genre: Encyclopedia
- Publisher: Stone Bridge Press
- Publication date: September 15, 2007 (print); August 1, 2007 (e-book)
- Publication place: United States
- Media type: Print (Paperback) and E-book
- Pages: 408 pp (first edition)
- ISBN: 978-1-933330-22-8: (print); ISBN 978-1-61172-519-3 (e-book)
- OCLC: 124985401

Anime Classics Zettai!: 100 Must-See Japanese Animation Masterpieces is a 2007 encyclopedia written by Brian Camp and Julie Davis and published by Stone Bridge Press, which provides basic details and short reviews of 100 Japanese anime titles, most of which have been translated and licensed for release in English in North America. Stone Bridge Press published the printed version on September 15, 2007, with the e-book version published on August 1, 2007.

== Reception ==
Harford County Public Library's Jamie Watson commends the books as "indispensable for anyone with an interest in anime", with further comments about the book's "interest to teens and also serve as a great reference for collection development as all of the movies are considered classics by the authors." Ain't It Cool News's Scott Green comments that the book is "written with a more objective voice than The Anime Encyclopedia or Manga: The Complete Guide. It is possible to suss out some vague sense of preference, but while a given person is unlikely to truly enjoy every work of anime discussed; every anime is described and evaluated in an even manner".
