= Elisha Tyson =

Philanthropist, abolitionist

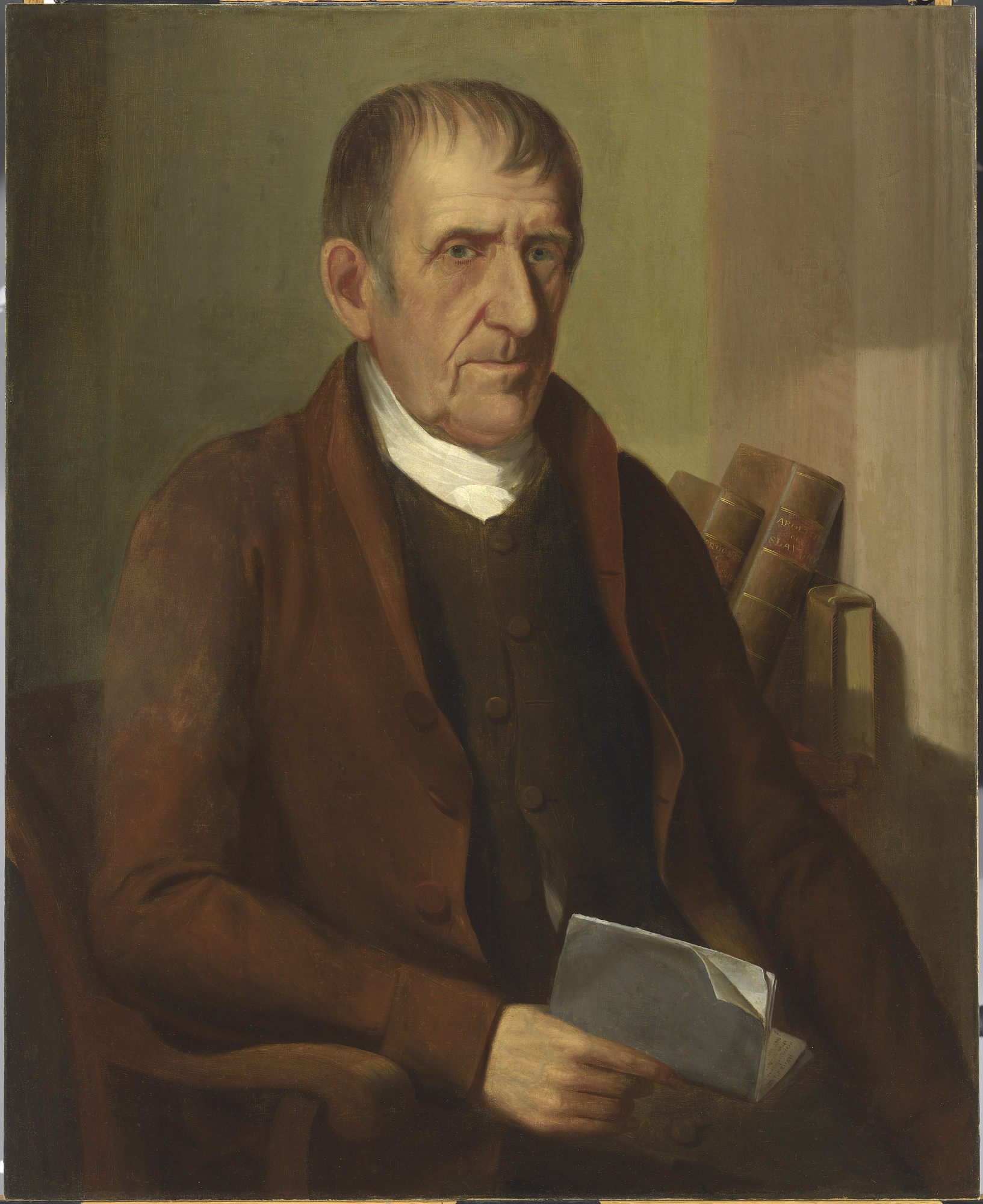
Robert Street, Elisha Tyson, 1823, National Portrait Gallery

Elisha Tyson (December 18, 1750 – February 16, 1824) was an American colonial millionaire and philanthropist who was active in the abolition movement, Underground Railroad, and African colonization movement. He helped black people escape slavery by establishing safe houses, or Underground Railroad stations, on the route from Maryland to Pennsylvania. He purchased the freedom of blacks at slave auctions. He also initiated lawsuits for kidnapped blacks and created a group of vigilantes to prevent blacks from being kidnapped and enslaved. He also returned some kidnapped people from Liberia to their home country.

The Quaker meetings he attended based upon his residence. As a child, his family was with the Abington Friends Meeting House. After moving to Maryland, he attended the Little Falls Meetinghouse and when he moved to Baltimore, he attended the Baltimore Quaker Meeting.

When he died, thousands of people of color followed his casket to its final resting place at a Quaker burial ground. He had ten children. His son Nathan married Martha Ellicott, who wrote the first biography of Benjamin Banneker, the first African American astronomer, and was a founder of Swarthmore College.

== Early life ==
Tyson was born in Upper Dublin Township, Montgomery County, Pennsylvania, to Esther Shoemaker and Isaac Tyson (1718–1796). They were affiliated with the Abington Friends Meeting House in the same county. (Note: Esther, his mother, was the daughter of Isaac and Dorothy (Penrose) Shoemaker. Esther was born April 2, 1732. She married Isaac Tyson on May 26 of either 1748 or 1749. She moved to Baltimore in 1783, where she died on September 8, 1794. His mother's name is also stated as Hester.) His siblings, born after him, were Tacey, Enos, Jacob, Nathan, and Sarah. Elisha, his brother, and his parents moved to Jericho in Maryland.

He came from a Quaker family based in Germantown, Philadelphia, Pennsylvania. His great-grandfather, the first Tyson ancestor in America, was among the first settlers of Pennsylvania. He was a German who was converted to the Quaker religion by George Fox. Tyson followed William Penn to England, after which he sailed for the colonies and settled near what is now Philadelphia, Pennsylvania. He married an English woman, whose father was a settler, and they had sons and daughters. (Note: The may have been Renier Tiesen who converted to Quakerism before coming to the American colonies in 1683. The group, including Renier (or Reynier), founded Germantown.)

== Career ==
In 1772, he set up in the milling business with his brother, buying Bond's Water Mill in Harford County, Maryland. He settled near Little Falls of the Gunpowder River in Jericho. He belonged to the Gunpowder Monthly Meeting. Nine years later, in 1781, he moved to Baltimore. At the close of the American Revolutionary War (1775–1783), Tyson began investing in real estate, but lost everything but the property suitable for a mill. He borrowed $12,000 to build a mill near what is now Druid Hill Park at Jones Falls. The first year, he had a profit of $20,000. Within several years he was a wealthy man. He was a flour miller, trader, and a merchant. In 1818, he was a founder of the Savings Bank of Baltimore.

He allowed the government use one of his mills to make bullets, although he was a pacifist. He believed in temperance and would not allow whiskey to process through his storehouses.

== Community advocate and activist ==
Due to his religious beliefs, Tyson was a pacifist and was not involved in politics. He was, though, very involved in multi-faceted approaches for assisting oppressed people. He was an emancipator and a philanthropist.

=== Abolitionist ===
Elisha was particularly vocal in maintaining the values of the Quakers, often recalling the protest of 1688, which had been the first public protest against the institution of slavery. In 1789, he became one of the founders of the Maryland Society for the Abolition of Slavery, the first abolitionist society in the state. Three years later he became a supporter of the African Academy, which in 1797 opened the first school for free African Americans.

=== Underground Railroad ===
Tyson was also active in offering practical assistance to fugitives from slavery, providing housing along Falls Road Turnpike to act as safe houses, or Underground Railroad stations, and helping these fugitives make their way to Pennsylvania. He purchased women and men at the slave auction in Baltimore, and set them free. He lobbied for laws to help slaves and blacks, persuaded slaveholders to free slaves, and helped provide schools and churches for freed blacks.

He organized vigilante groups, known as the "Georgia men" to thwart the efforts of men who kidnapped black people—both runaway slaves and free people—and enslaved them. He helped thousands of kidnapped slaves earn their freedom through legal suits. Although he received threats against his life and house, he continued to rescue slaves. He was threatened with a pistol by a slave dealer, Austin Woolfolk, when Tyson intervened as Woolfolk dragged a black woman past his house in Baltimore. Tyson calmly "unbuttoned his shirt and exposed his chest. He invited the slave dealer to pull the trigger, telling him that he 'was in hell already though he [Woolfolk] didn't know it.' " An investigation revealed that she was a free woman kidnapped by Woolfolk and she was set free.

Tyson sought to gain the freedom of slaves that had been captured as a war prize on the sea. Capt. John Chase captured the Brilliante Habanero a Spanish slave ship. He took 14 of the slaves into his crew and sold 28 people in the West Indies during the summer of 1822. Tyson lobbied for their freedom and filed freedom suits on their behalf, but the case was denied. With the help of Charles Carroll, Robert Goodloe Harper, and Dr. Ely Ayres, who was a member of the American Colonization Society, the judge changed his opinion and ordered that the men be released. Chase captured three men, and 11 men were freed.

=== African colonization ===
Tyson supported transporting blacks to Africa. He purchases farming equipment and household goods for the colonization of eleven slaves who sailed on the Fidelity for Africa in 1823. Once Tyson, who had been ill, heard that the men made it safely to Liberia, he stated that he was content to die now.

=== Other ===
He provided free medical care to the poor when he established the Baltimore General Dispensary. When the Maryland Penitentiary opened in 1811, Tyson, a member of the directors, ensured that the institute did not engage in racial discrimination.

About 1810, when he was 60 years of age, he traveled on horseback with his friend George Gillingham to Fort Wayne, Indiana to meet with Native American leaders to better understand their needs and concerns. During the trip, he became ill due to exposure.

== Personal life ==
He built a mansion on Hanover Street in Baltimore. Soon after its completion, a man offered to pay much more than its value to purchase it. Tyson sold the house to him and built a new one at Sharp Street, between Pratt and Lombard. He bought four houses across from his for his children: Isaac, Nathan, William, and Mary Tyson Clapp. Elisha's house was across the street from a colored meeting house. He owned a summer house on 732 Pacific Street near Falls Road Turnpike, which he helped finance in 1805. Built with two-feet-thick granite, the house is a classic Federal style.

He married Mary Amos, daughter of Hannah and William Amos, on November 5, 1776. She wore a gray silk cloak on her wedding day. Like the Amos family, Tyson was a member of the Little Falls Meetinghouse. Five of their eleven children died young. They had Isaac; Esther, who died in childbirth; Lucretia; William; Mary; Nathan; James, who died young; two girls named Sarah, who both died young; Elisha, and Deborah Darby Tyson. His wife, Mary, died on April 17, 1813. He married Margaret Cowman of Anne Arundel County, Maryland on October 22, 1814. They did not have any children. She died on January 29, 1853. His son Nathan married Martha Ellicott, who wrote the first biography of Benjamin Banneker, the first African American astronomer. It was entitled A Sketch of the Life (1854). She was a founder of Swarthmore College.

Tyson died on February 16, 1824, in Baltimore. His funeral, one of the largest in the city, saw several thousand or four thousand blacks accompany Tyson's casket to its final resting place at the Friends Burial Ground in Baltimore. (Note: In 1905, the Baltimore Sun stated that the streets of Baltimore were full as 10,000 black people paid their respects to Tyson. The Friends Journal also stated that there were 10,000 black mourners.) An obituary of Tyson in The United States Gazette stated that "the wrongs inflicted on Africa's children made a deep and indelible impression on his heart, till its last beat..." Before he died, Tyson wrote "A Farewell Address by Elisha Tyson of the City of Baltimore to the Colored People of the United States", which was published on April 6, 1824, by The United States Gazette .
