= Sharp Street Memorial United Methodist Church and Community House =

Historic church in Maryland, United States

- U.S. National Register of Historic Places
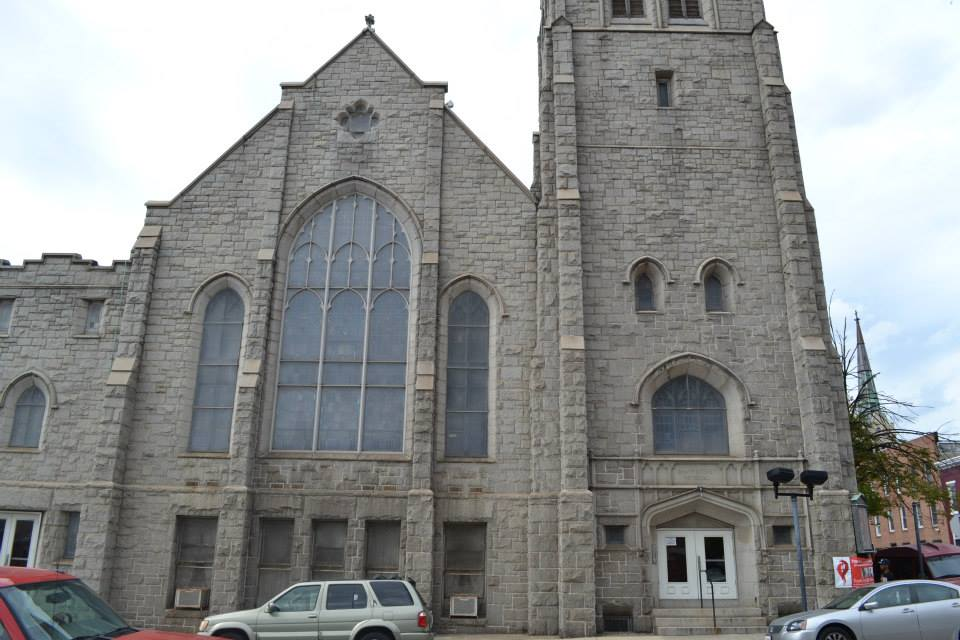

- Location within Baltimore Location within Maryland Location within the United States
- Location: 508--516 Dolphin St. & 1206--1210 Etting St., Baltimore, Maryland
- Coordinates: 39°18′3″N 76°37′44″W
- Area: less than one acre
- Built: 1898
- Architect: Bieler, Alphonsus H.; Noel, Edgar M.
- Architectural style: Colonial Revival, Gothic Revival, Georgian Revival
- NRHP reference No.: 82004749
- Added to NRHP: July 21, 1982

Sharp Street Memorial United Methodist Church and Community House is a historic United Methodist church located at Baltimore, Maryland, United States. It is an 1898 Gothic Revival stone structure of massive proportions. It features sharply pitched gables, a square parapeted 85-foot-high bell tower, lancet windows, and Gothic influenced interior decorative detailing. The Community House is a Georgian Revival influenced brick structure, four stories high and built in 1921. The congregation was organized in 1787 and was highly influential in the antebellum freedom movement, the establishment of the first black school in Baltimore after the abolition of slavery, and the movement to foster the institution of the African American Methodist church. It is known as the "Mother Church" of Black Methodism in Maryland. The National Association for the Advancement of Colored People, during their formative years, held their meetings at this historic church.

Sharp Street Memorial United Methodist Church and Community House was listed on the National Register of Historic Places in 1982.

== See also ==
- African Academy and Sharp Street Methodist Church (1797–1898)
