= Humane Society of Harford County =

Organization in Fallston, Maryland, US

The Humane Society of Harford County, Inc.
- Founded: 1946
- Founder: Mrs. Elsa Horne Voss
- Type: 501(c)(3)
- Tax ID no.: 52-0567970
- Location: Fallston, Maryland
- Region served: Harford County, Maryland State
- Website: http://www.harfordshelter.org/

The Humane Society of Harford County, Inc. (HSHC) is a nonprofit open admission animal shelter located in Fallston, Maryland, contracted with the Harford County Government to provide sheltering services for all animals brought to HSHC by Animal Control (which is operated under the Harford County Sheriff's Office) as stray, or subjects of animal cruelty or neglect cases.

HSHC is also obligated to accept animals from Harford County residents wishing to relinquish their pets, or stray animals which are found in Harford County by private citizens. The shelter takes in approximately 3,000 animals per year, and since 2016 has maintained a live release rate of 90% or higher.

== History ==
In 1944, a wealthy socialite named Elsa Horne Voss and approximately 100 residents of Harford County, Maryland banded together for a common cause and organized the Humane Society of Harford County. This group of animal lovers pledged themselves to care for pets which were ill or who had no home. For a time, HSHC was operated from the homes of these individuals, including on Mrs. Voss’ property, known as Atlanta Hall. Sometime in the early 1940s, Mrs. Voss purchased a small dairy farm at 2208 Connolly Road, in Fallston, Maryland, which would become the permanent home of HSHC. On February 5, 1946, HSHC was officially incorporated by the State of Maryland.

Originally, the shelter had just 10 wooden dog kennels, which housed both stray dogs and cats. The residents of the property, Mr. and Mrs. Sid Boniface, served as caretakers and kennel workers for the facility. The staff not only took care of the animals on the premises but also went out into the county to pick up stray and injured animals. At that time, Harford County did not have an Animal Control department.

Word soon spread about the facility and more animals were brought to the shelter until it was filled to capacity. People who adopted pets were charged between two and three dollars for each animal. This fee also made them a member of the Humane Society. Many adoptable animals were provided care for several months.

In 1961, the existing wooden kennels were replaced with steel gauge kennels and 11 more kennels, with indoor and outdoor runs, were added. Heat was also installed in the kennel area under the floor to keep the animals warm in winter time.

In 1971, a front lobby with a reception area was added to the building; and in 1976 an area to house the chickens, ducks, peacocks, geese, etc., was constructed to house these animals safely.

For years the cats available for adoption were housed in one of the dog kennels. So in 1981 a room in the old farmhouse was converted to a cat room where cats and kittens could play freely.

Anyone who visited HSHC in the 1980s and early 90s knew there were many times when the front office was full of people and animals. It was impossible to hear the phone and at times, was dangerous with too many animals entering and exiting this confined space. In 1994 the Board of Directors approved the construction of a new front office. The project was completed in the fall of 1994, and the old office was converted into two new dog kennels.

In 2006, Rebel's Dog Park, a free community dog park, was opened on the grounds of HSHC. The dog park was closed temporarily at the start of the construction of a new shelter facility in 2014, and the decision was made to close the dog park permanently in 2017.

On September 4, 2014, ground was broken on the new 19,000 square foot shelter facility, and on Easter weekend in 2016, shelter operations moved into the new building. A grand opening and ribbon cutting, attended by State and other local dignitaries, donors, supporters, and members of the local media, took place on Saturday, October 22, 2016.

== Programs & Services ==
HSHC is an open admission shelter and takes in approximately 4,000-4,500 animals every year from Harford County's population of 250,290, including cats, dogs, rodents, reptiles, birds, fish, farm animals, and wildlife. The shelter offers these animals for adoption at its primary location, as well as cats for adoption at several satellite locations such as pet supply stores and veterinary hospitals, and takes animals offsite to regularly scheduled and one-off adoption events at various locations in Harford, Baltimore, and Cecil counties as well as Baltimore City. In addition, a robust foster program helps alleviate overcrowding at the shelter.

Over 250 volunteers provide supplemental staffing to the paid staff of approximately 24 employees. In-house veterinary care is provided by the veterinarian on staff. Animal enrichment programs provide for the physical and mental well-being of the animals in the shelter's care. The shelter works with many animal rescue groups to help reduce the risk of euthanasia. Humane Education programs are offered to schools, libraries, youth groups, and others to nurture compassion and respect for living things.

HSHC also practices shelter intervention, through its pet food bank program, free behavior consultations, and surrender prevention counseling, with the goal of keeping pets with their families thereby reducing shelter intake and decreasing euthanasia rates. As mentioned, HSHC offers free behavior consultations, as well as low-cost dog and puppy training classes, through a partnership with Mutt Magic, Inc. HSHC also offers compassionate, low-cost euthanasia services to residents of Harford County who cannot afford to take their pet to a veterinarian for the service.

== Funding & Fundraising ==
HSHC is a nonprofit organization, and therefore relies on donations from individuals, local businesses, corporations, and foundations to carry out its mission. As part of its contract with the Harford County Government, the shelter also receives a portion of its annual $1.3mm operating budget from the Government. HSHC's Executive Director and Board of Directors is tasked with fundraising responsibilities, and the organization holds several fundraising events throughout the year, as well as special appeals, grant appeals, and other fundraising activities.

== Relationship to Animal Control ==
HSHC does not provide animal control or humane law enforcement services. Animal control services are provided to the County through the Harford County Sheriff's Office. Stray animals picked up by animal control, or animals seized by animal control, are brought to HSHC for care and shelter during their stray hold period or until any case filed against an owner is closed. At the end of the stray hold, or if an owner charged with cruelty or neglect pleads or is found guilty, the animal becomes the property of HSHC, who will determine its disposition.

== Awards ==
- Best Charity/Nonprofit by readers of The Baltimore Sun supplement, Harford Magazine from 2013 to 2022.
- Best Charity/Nonprofit by readers of Harford County Living from 2016 to 2022.
- Harford Award for Best Local Nonprofit, given by the Harford County Chamber of Commerce, in 2018.
