= Abington Friends Meeting House =

Quaker meeting house in Pennsylvania

Coordinates: 40°5′36.8″N 75°7′5.35″W

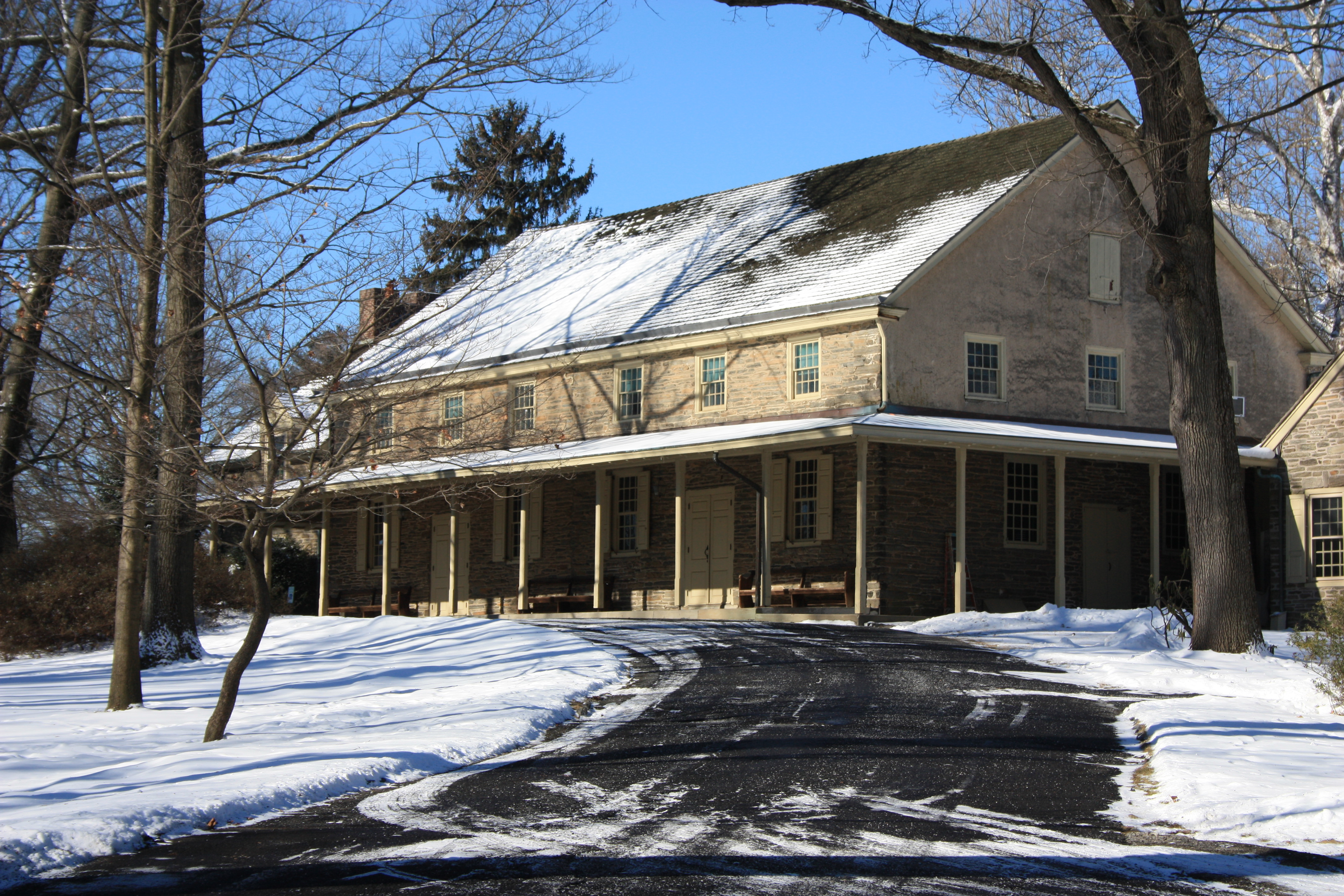
Abington Friends Meeting House

Abington Friends Meeting House is a Quaker meeting house located in Jenkintown, Pennsylvania.

== History ==
The original meeting house was established from 1698 to 1699, with land and a 100 pounds sterling donated by John Barnes. In 1784, a separate school building was established for the Abington Friends School.

The 200th anniversary of the school was celebrated on May 11, 1899. The principal at that time, Louis H. Ambler, "spoke of the importance of celebrating the events surrounding the early settlement of Friends in this country" (the United States). Elizabeth R. Cox read a poem by Ellwood Roberts, entitled "Abington," and William J. Buck spoke about the school's early history.

== Notable people ==
- Elisha Tyson, abolitionist
- Benjamin Lay, Quaker activist
