= Abington Friends School =

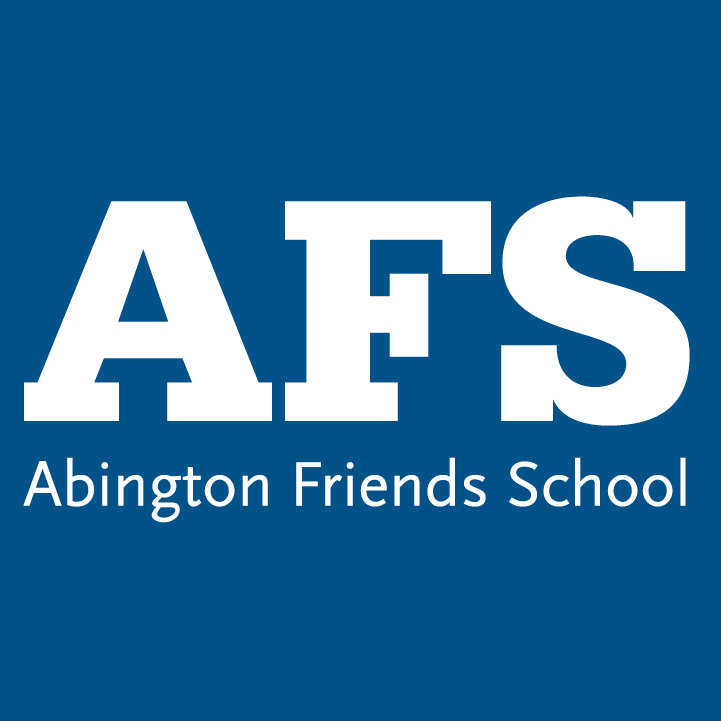

Location
- 575 Washington Lane; Jenkintown postal address, PA 19046; United States; 40.0949°N 75.1205°W

Information
- Type: Private
- Religious affiliation: Quaker
- Established: 1697; 329 years ago
- Head of School: Dr. Nicole Hood
- Enrollment: roughly 600 annually
- Colors: Blue and white
- Athletics conference: Friends Schools League
- Mascot: Kangaroos
- Website: abingtonfriends.net

Abington Friends School is a private, Quaker secondary school in Abington Township, Montgomery County, Pennsylvania, United States, with a Jenkintown postal address. Serving students from age 3 to grade 12, Abington Friends School has stood on its original campus since 1697, and is the oldest primary and secondary educational institution in the United States to operate continuously at the same location under the same management. The school draws students from approximately 75 ZIP codes around the greater Philadelphia area, as well as international students from many regions of China.

== Campus ==
Abington Friends School sits on a fifty-acre (20 ha) campus which includes a meadow, Quaker meeting house, a portion of Jenkintown Creek, and extensive playing fields. Lower, middle, and upper school buildings and athletic facilities sit at the center of the campus.

Campus facilities include:

- The Faulkner Library and Learning Center, a dramatic space which is home to a collection of over 25,000 print volumes, special collections including a peace collection and a leadership collection
- The AFS Outside Classroom, the first nature playground and outdoor classroom in Pennsylvania to be accredited by the National Arbor Day Foundation
- A media and design lab, home to computer assisted design and engineering software workstations
- The Wilf Center, which provides resources to enrich skills of active engagement, discernment, collaboration leadership, and continual learning
- The Josephine Muller Auditorium, a fully equipped professional theatre
- The Black Box Theatre, a flexible space for student-produced performances, cabarets, and open mic nights
- Art, Ceramics and Photography Studios, housing multiple potters wheels, five kilns, and a fully furnished dark room and lab
- Choral, instrumental and music classrooms and an electronic music studio, featuring Apple and Roland recording software and hardware, baby grand pianos, and a full instrumental backline
- Athletic Facilities that include the Berman Athletics Center, the Thode Fitness Center, four soccer fields, six tennis courts, and several baseball and softball diamonds

== Academic program ==
The Early Childhood and Lower School Program at AFS serves students age 3 to 4th grade, the Middle School program 5th through 8th grade, and the Upper School program 9th through 12th grade.

== History ==
Abington Friends School was founded in March 1697, when John Barnes, a wealthy tailor who belonged to the Abington Monthly Meeting of the Religious Society of Friends, donated 120 acres (49 ha) of his estate "for and towards erecting a meetinghouse for Friends and toward the maintenance of a school under the direction of Friends." The school has been continuously operated on the same plot of land since its founding in that year, making it the oldest school in the Commonwealth of Pennsylvania with such a claim. AFS operates under the care of Abington Monthly Meeting of the Religious Society of Friends.

In its earliest days the school was located in one large room in the Friends' meeting house, with the principles of the Religious Society of Friends dominating virtually every aspect of school life. In the 1780s the school moved to a structure of its own, the present day caretaker's house adjacent to the meeting house on Greenwood Avenue. Boys occupied the first floor room, while girls were instructed in the upstairs room. Boys were responsible for supplying firewood for the stoves in each room and the girls collected drinking water from the Jenkintown Creek behind the meeting house.

Coeducation was not the only way in which the School observed the Quaker testimony of equality. By the mid-18th century, Abington Friends School admitted African American students too. Throughout the 18th century, AFS provided an education for the primary grades only, with enrollment fluctuating between 20 and 40 students, most of whom were Quaker.

The foundations for the modern school we know today were laid in the 1880s, when the school was transformed from an ungraded primary day school with around 90 students and two teachers to a boarding school that served kindergarten through twelfth grade. The new school was opened in 1887 on the triangular property bordered by present-day Greenwood Avenue, Jenkintown Road, and Meetinghouse Road.

By 1931, the school had become an all-girls college preparatory school, which offered a more progressive education than many of the all-girls schools by including exchange programs with European schools, mandatory community service and greater diversity in student enrollment.

The School Committee of Abington Monthly Meeting decided to return to coeducation in 1966. By 1975 all grades, kindergarten through twelfth, contained both boys and girls. Under the leadership of headmaster Adelbert Mason, the school's facilities expanded, with new buildings for the Lower, Middle, and Upper Schools. Growth continued in the late 1980s with a new science and arts wing in the Lower School.

== Athletics ==
AFS offers sports including soccer, basketball, baseball, cross country, wrestling, swimming, tennis, softball, and women's lacrosse.

The boys basketball team has been the school's most successful team, winning numerous Friends School League titles under the coaching of National Jewish Sports Hall of Fame and Museum selection Steve Chadwin. Chadwin has coached an array of players at AFS who have gone on to have very strong college careers. Jabril Trawick was on the Georgetown Hoyas men's basketball team. His classmate Kenneth Johnson transferred in 2014 to MacEwan University in Edmonton, Alberta. In the 2013–2014 season, AFS produced two 1,000 point scorers, Joe Robinson and Jordan Greene, at 20.7 and 22.3 points per game respectively. They are the highest-scoring duo in Friends School League history.

== Notable alumni ==
- Joey Lawrence (1994), actor and singer
- Hal Lublin (1995), actor and podcaster
- Mike Jordan (1996), basketball player who played overseas
- Matthew Lawrence (1998), actor and singer
- Jason Love (2006), assistant coach for the Milwaukee Bucks, played overseas
- Bryan Cohen (2008), basketball player who played overseas
- Jabril Trawick (2011), basketball player who played overseas
