= Jabril Trawick =

American basketball player (born 1992)

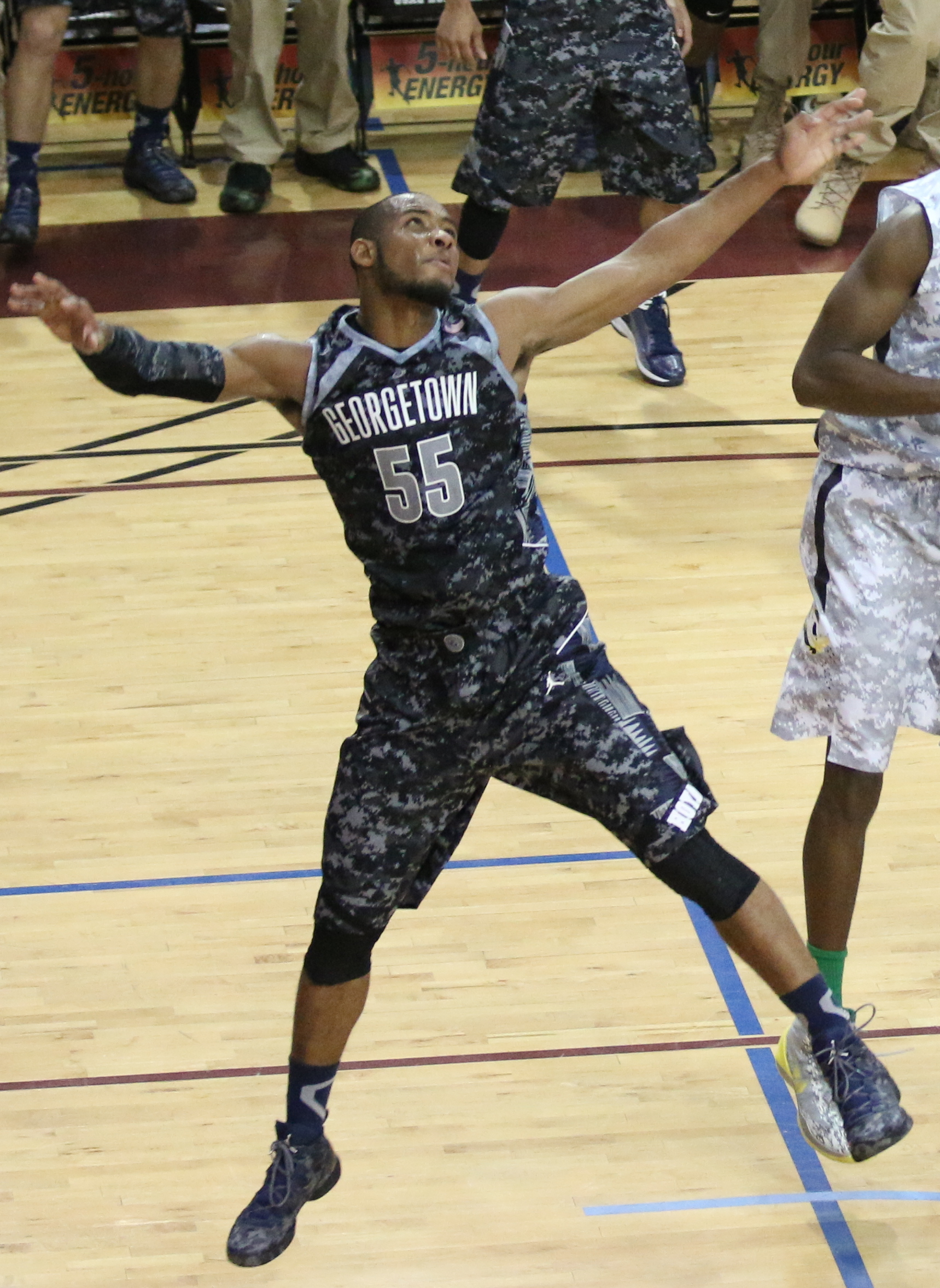
- Trawick playing for Georgetown

Personal information
- Born: June 17, 1992 (age 34) Philadelphia, Pennsylvania, U.S.
- Listed height: 6 ft 6 in (1.98 m)
- Listed weight: 215 lb (98 kg)

Career information
- High school: Abington Friends (Jenkintown, Pennsylvania)
- College: Georgetown (2011–2015)
- NBA draft: 2015: undrafted
- Playing career: 2015–2017
- Position: Small forward / shooting guard

Career history
- 2015–2017: Sioux Falls Skyforce
- 2017: GlobalPort Batang Pier
- 2017: Hapoel Holon

Career highlights
- NBA D-League champion (2016)

Jabril Trawick (born June 17, 1992) is an American former professional basketball player. He played college basketball for Georgetown.

== High school career ==
Trawick attended Abington Friends School where he scored 500 points as a senior and finished his career with 1,167 points. He was named First Team All-State as a senior and was an all-area selection.

== College career ==
Trawick attended Georgetown where he averaged 9.1 points as a senior, 3.6 rebounds and 2.4 assists while scoring in double figures 13 times, 11 of which were against Big East foes. He played the second-most number of minutes with 27.9, and led the team from behind the arc with a 40.7% three-point shooting percentage, leading the Hoyas to the #4 seed in the 2015 NCAA Tournament.

== Professional career ==
After going undrafted in the 2015 NBA draft, Trawick joined the Orlando Magic for the 2015 NBA Summer League. On October 31, 2015, he was selected by the Sioux Falls Skyforce with the 14th overall pick in the 2015 NBA Development League Draft. On November 14, he made his professional debut in a 98–95 loss to the Iowa Energy, recording five points in one minute of the bench. On February 27, 2016, he scored a season-high 23 points on 8-of-8 shooting against the Maine Red Claws. He helped the Skyforce finish with a D-League-best 40–10 record in 2015–16, and went on to help the team win the league championship with a 2–1 Finals series win over the Los Angeles D-Fenders.

On November 1, 2016, Trawick was reacquired by the Sioux Falls Skyforce.

On August 1, 2017, Trawick signed with Israeli club Hapoel Holon for the 2017–18 season. However, on October 30, 2017, he was released by Holon after appearing in seven games.

== Personal life ==
The son of Saskia Jones and Hakeem Trawick, he has two sisters, Bashia and Faji, and two brothers, Khalil and Hakim.
