= Harford County Public Library =

Public library in Maryland, US

- Location: Harford County, Maryland, United States
- Type: Public library
- Established: 1946
- Service area: Harford County, Maryland
- Branches: 11

Other information
- CEO: Mary L. Hastler
- Website: hcplonline.org

Harford County Public Library (HCPL) is a public library system serving Harford County, Maryland. The system operates 11 branches, a headquarters, and six outreach vehicles. In fiscal year 2025, HCPL recorded 804,820 visits to its branches and circulation of 3,143,704 items, and reported 161,610 registered borrowers.

== History ==
Library service in Harford County predates the county library system. The Bel Air Circulating Library was organized in 1885, and the Harford County Library Association was formed in 1912. The association operated the county's first free library from rooms above a tailor shop on Main Street in Bel Air.

Under Maryland's State Library Law of 1945, Harford became the first county in the state to take advantage of the program, which authorized matching state funds for county library systems. The first Harford County Board of Library Trustees was formed in January 1946, and the Harford County Library Association subsequently transferred its assets to the new public library system. In 1947, the former Grace Methodist Church on Main Street became the system's headquarters, and approximately 12,300 books were moved there.

The system expanded as Harford County grew. A purpose-built Bel Air library was dedicated in 1960, and additional permanent branches were established throughout the county in subsequent decades. Mobile outreach also became part of the system: the Rolling Reader began serving children in 2001, and the Silver Reader was introduced in 2006 to provide library services to senior communities. The original Rolling Reader was retired in November 2023 and replaced by a new outreach vehicle unveiled in December 2025.

== Services ==
Harford County Public Library provides circulating print, audio, video, and digital materials, as well as public computers and Internet access, meeting rooms, information services, and programs for children and adults.

The library's digital services include eBooks, eAudiobooks, digital magazines, and streaming media. The Abingdon branch houses an Innovation Lab for video, audio, publishing, and 3D design projects, while the Bel Air branch serves as a passport acceptance facility. HCPL also maintains a collection of more than 300 oral histories of Harford County residents recognized as Living Treasures.

== Awards ==
In 2023, Harford County Public Library received an American Inhouse Design Award from Graphic Design USA (GDUSA) for the graphics on its Traveling Library outreach vehicles. It was the third time the library had received an American Inhouse Design Award since 2018.

Also in 2023, The Daily Record named HCPL one of the inaugural recipients of its Empowering Women Award, which recognizes organizations for efforts to support and advance women in the workplace and community.

In 2024, the Maryland Library Association presented HCPL with its Excellence in Marketing Award for the marketing campaign for the Harford County Public Library Foundation's 19th annual gala, SpyBall: Secrets in the Stacks.

== Branches ==
Harford County Public Library operates 11 branches throughout the county.

Harford County Public Library branches

Branch	Address	Current facility opened	Notes
Aberdeen	21 Franklin St., Aberdeen, MD 21001	November 1975	
Abingdon	2510 Tollgate Road, Abingdon, MD 21009	May 17, 2004	
Bel Air	100 E. Pennsylvania Ave., Bel Air, MD 21014	1960	Expanded in 1967 and again in 1997; renovation of the original building was completed in 1998.
Darlington	3535 Conowingo Road, Street, MD 21154	October 19, 2022	Relocated from Darlington Village to a repurposed building in Street.
Edgewood	629 Edgewood Road, Edgewood, MD 21040	December 1963	Expanded in 1979 and reopened following another renovation and expansion in February 2001.
Fallston	1461 Fallston Road, Fallston, MD 21047	December 1984	Originally the Fallston/Jarrettsville Branch; after the separate Jarrettsville branch opened in 2006, it primarily served the Fallston area.
Havre de Grace	120 N. Union Ave., Havre de Grace, MD 21078	June 15, 2016	Replaced a library building at the same address that had opened in 1987.
Jarrettsville	3722 Norrisville Road, Jarrettsville, MD 21084	May 1, 2006	
Joppa	655 Towne Center Drive, Joppa, MD 21085	July 1980	Major renovation completed in 2000.
Norrisville	5310 Norrisville Road, White Hall, MD 21161	February 1, 2003	Joint facility with the Harford County Department of Parks and Recreation.
Whiteford	2407 Whiteford Road, Whiteford, MD 21160	June 1992	Expanded and reopened in January 2010.

=== Other services ===
==== Rolling Reader ====
The Rolling Reader is an outreach bookmobile serving children from birth through eighth grade. It began operating in January 2001 to bring library resources and technology to children who might not otherwise have access to a library branch. Based at the Edgewood branch, it visits after-school programs, early-literacy centers, youth organizations, and community programs throughout the year.

==== Silver Reader ====
The Silver Reader outreach service began in 2006 to provide library services to residents of senior housing, assisted-living facilities, and long-term-care facilities. In 2021, the program introduced lobby-stop service, in which library staff bring temporary collections and other library services into senior communities. The original 33-foot Silver Reader bookmobile was largely retired from regular service in 2023, with staff transitioning routine outreach to the library's Traveling Library Van.
