= African Academy (Baltimore) =

First permanent school in Baltimore, Maryland, for African Americans

Coordinates: 39.287°N 76.618°W

African Academy was the first permanent school for African Americans in Baltimore, Maryland. It was located at 112–116 Sharp Street, between Lombard and Pratt.

There was an initial attempt to operate the African Academy beginning in 1797, when a group of black Methodists received support from the Maryland Society for the Abolition of Slavery, specifically involving Elisha Tyson and his brother Jesse Tyson. The school and meetinghouse was opened on what is now Saratoga Street (previously Fish Street), but after a few months they were forced to leave the building due to insufficient funds. The meetinghouse congregation was affiliated with the Lovely Lane Meeting House until 1802.

Having acquired sufficient funds, the African Methodist Episcopal Church and the African Academy were established on Sharp Street in 1802 by the Colored Methodist Society, at which time the congregation separated from the Lovely Lane Meeting House. Daniel Coker, who was the school headmaster until 1817, established the Bethel Charity School in 1807. It was sponsored by the Colored Methodist Society. Children from Baltimore and Washington, D.C., attended the school. In 1817, Coker became the pastor of the Bethel African Methodist Episcopal Church on Saratoga Street, east of Holliday Street, and operated the school at that location. By the 1820s, there were 150 students in attendance.

Daniel Coker, a founder of the African Methodist Episcopal Church, was also the lead teacher of the congregation until 1817. In 1860, a new church was built on the same site. A Gothic style church, named the Sharp Street Memorial United Methodist Church and Community House, was built on Dolphin and Etting Streets in 1898.
