= Killing of Kujoe Bonsafo Agyei-Kodie =

Murder in Joppatowne, Maryland, United States

- Location: Joppatowne, Maryland, U.S.
- Date: May 25, 2012
- Attack type: Murder, cannibalization
- Weapon: Axe
- Deaths: 1
- Perpetrator: 1
- Charges: First-degree murder
- Verdict: Guilty but not criminally responsible
- Judge: Stephen Waldron

Kujoe Bonsafo Agyei-Kodie, a Ghanaian exchange student, was killed by Alexander Kinyua in 2012 in Joppatowne, Maryland, United States. Kinyua ate Agyei-Kodie's organs in an act of cannibalism. The killing came after Kinyua was released on bail following a separate brutal attack.

== Background ==
Kwadwo "Kujoe" Agyei-Kodie had come to the United States from Ghana to pursue a doctoral degree at Morgan State University in Baltimore, having already obtained several master's degrees in Ghana. While at Morgan State, he met Anthony Kinyua, father of his alleged killer. Agyei-Kodie stopped his studies in 2008. He had been living with the Kinyua family for six weeks before his death, pending self-deportation due to non-compliance with the terms of his visa.

Alexander "Alex" Kinyua was born on October 23, 1990, in Nairobi, Kenya. Kinyua emigrated from Kenya to the United States as a child, and became a U.S. citizen. At the time of the alleged murder and cannibalism, 21-year-old Kinyua was an engineering student at Morgan State University, where his father is a professor.

Kinyua had posted nonsensical and bizarre writings on his Facebook page. For example, Kinyua posted the following in all capital letters, two days before the arrest:

Hear me out butchers: are you strong enough to endure ritual HBCU mass human sacrifices around the country and still be able to function as human beings? It's been all too tragic with the dual university shootings at Virginia Tech, and other past university killings across the country. Now for a twist: ethnic cleansing is the policy, strategy and tactics that will affect you, directly or indirectly in the coming months. This is the brutal basis, an evil & terrifying method of this death cults.

Kinyua's mother posted on her Facebook:

Our son, Alexander Kimanthi Kinyua, was arrested on Saturday, May 19, for being involved in a fight in his dormitory room at Morgan State University. The charge against him is "1st Degree Assault and Excessive Endangerment of Life". His bail has been set for US $220,000.00. In order to get him the best defense possible, we need to secure an attorney who will take his case and leave no stone unturned.

== Killing ==
On Friday, May 25, 2012, Kujoe Bonsafo Agyei-Kodie was reported missing by Kinyua's father. Police reported to the Kinyua residence on May 31 after being contacted by Kinyua's brother, to report what looked like body parts in two tins in the basement. Further remains were found outside a church, about a mile away. Alexander Kinyua was arrested and charged with first degree murder, along with first and second degree assault.

== Aftermath ==
Morgan State established a chief public safety officer position in the wake of the killing.

Kinyua was diagnosed with paranoid schizophrenia, and was found incompetent to stand trial.

Kinyua has been indefinitely committed to a Maryland mental institution.

== See also ==
- Internet homicide
- List of incidents of cannibalism
