= Joppa Iron Works =

19th century iron works near Baltimore, Maryland, US

Coordinates: 39°24′45″N 76°23′41″W

The Joppa Iron Works, also known as Patterson's Iron Works, was founded around 1817 by Joseph and Edward Patterson of Baltimore, the brothers of Elizabeth Patterson Bonaparte, the sister-in-law of Napoleon I of France.

== Construction ==
Built at the falls-line of the (Dividing line of the Coastal Plain, the Piedmont Plateau) Big Gunpowder River in eastern Baltimore County, Maryland, the plant was started as a slitting and nail-making company. Located about 0.75 mi (1.21 km) below current-day Maryland Route 7, it eventually had six puddling furnaces, one heating furnace, and 37 water-powered nail machines.

The Joppa Iron Works were on the Great Gunpowder not quite a mile from its embouchure and near Divers Island. They were operated up to the commencement of the civil war and their product was well known in all the markets. They consisted of a large rolling mill nail works and forges. First-class vessels came up the river to the island and the embankments for the wharves are still visible. Where the main channel of the Gunpowder once was and where sea going ships rode at anchor is now a corn field on the Mount Peru estate. One rolling mill an immense stone structure abandoned more than twenty years ago still stands and is almost covered by the rank luxuriance of the Virginia creeper. The works were owned and operated by that Patterson family of which Madame Elizabeth Patterson Bonaparte was a member, who sold the whole tract of one hundred and thirty four acres known as Bald Hill to the city of Baltimore for water privileges for twenty thousand dollars. The city resold it and it is now the property of Levi Furstenburg.

— John Thomas Scharf, 1881

== Conversion into a whiskey distillery ==
The Joppa Iron Works closed around 1865 with the death of Edward Patterson. The Loreley Distilling Company eventually purchased the property and distilled whiskey on the site, closing when Prohibition took effect; selling the property to the Frank L. Wight Distilling Co. in 1933. Frank Wight sold the company to Hiram Walker & Sons of Canada in 1941. The site was subsequently shut down in 1948 when production moved to their Peoria, Illinois, facility.

== Remnants on the site ==
Few remnants of the iron works that remain; a mill race and some stone foundations are still visible. Iron bolts and an old ship's mooring ring are still visible in various boulders. Remnants of slag from the furnaces can still be found in the area. In 1970, the property was acquired by the Department of Forest & Parks Maryland and is now part of the Gunpowder State Park.
