= Rockdale (Fallston, Maryland) =

Historic house in Maryland, United States

- U.S. National Register of Historic Places
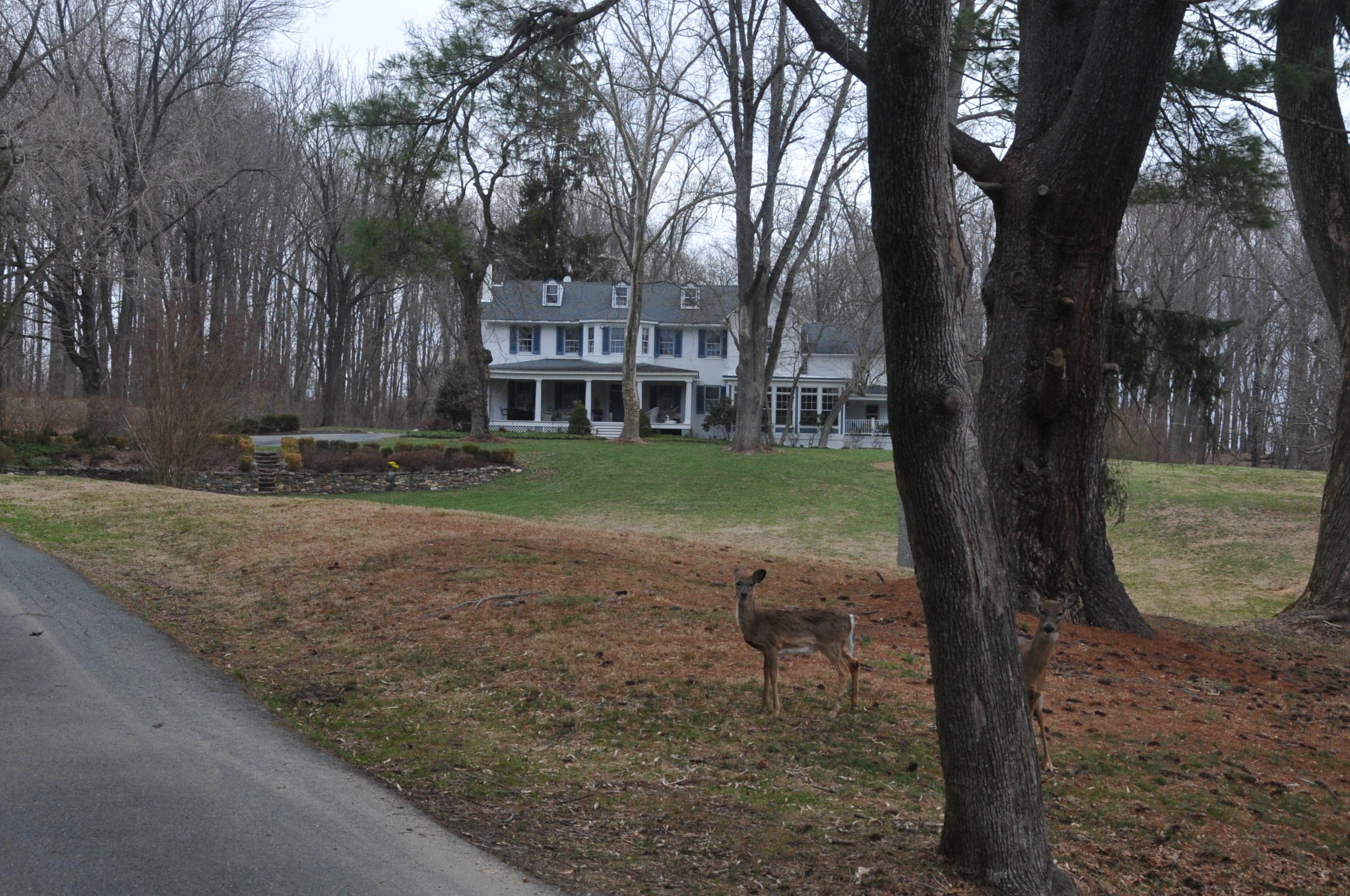
- Rockdale in 2007

- Location within Maryland Location within the United States
- Location: 1724 Carrs Mill Road, Fallston, Maryland
- Coordinates: 39°32′3″N 76°24′19″W
- Area: 6.5 acres (2.6 ha)
- Built: 1815
- NRHP reference No.: 82002814
- Added to NRHP: June 30, 1982

Rockdale, also known as The Robinson/Stirling Place, is a historic home and farm complex located at Fallston, Harford County, Maryland, United States. It is a farm developed from the late 18th century through the early 20th century. The dwelling is in three parts. The east room of the east wing is the earliest section dating from the 18th century. The largest or main portion of the dwelling dates from between 1815 and 1830. The north wing, a bay centered in the south façade of the second story, and a small conservatory, date from the very early 20th century. The main house is five bays in length, two and a half stories, of stone construction, stuccoed and scored. The home is surrounded by several outbuildings, trees, and other plantings, and the remains of formal gardens and garden structures developed in the early 20th century. It was the residence of William E. Robinson (1860-1935), an entrepreneur in the local canning industry.

Rockdale was listed on the National Register of Historic Places in 1982.
