= Gunpowder Falls State Park =

State park in Maryland, United States

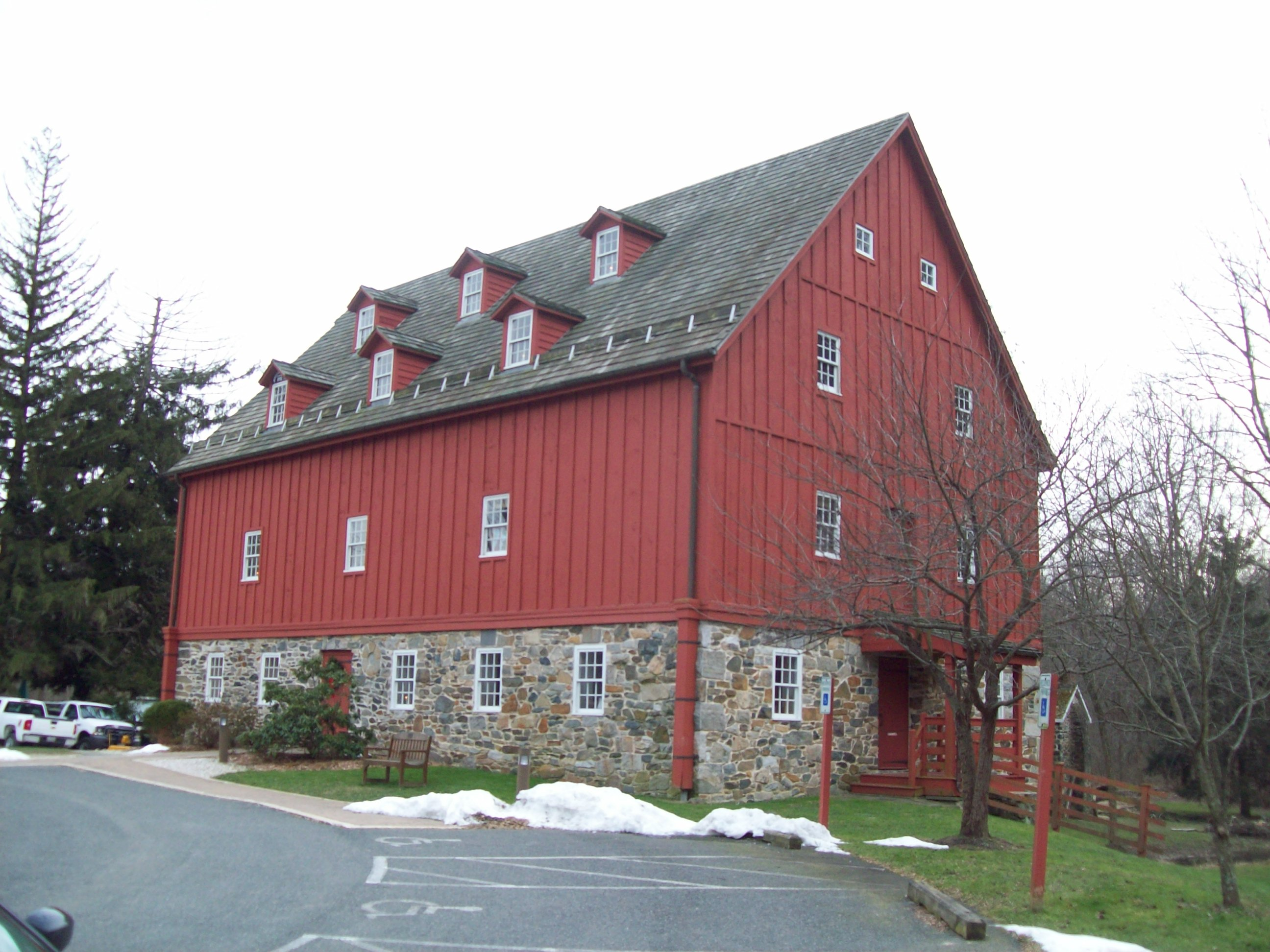
- Park headquarters at Jerusalem Mill Village

- Location within Maryland
- Location: Baltimore and Harford counties, Maryland, United States
- Nearest city: Baltimore, Maryland
- Coordinates: 39°21′45″N 76°20′33″W
- Area: 15,088 acres (6,106 ha)
- Elevation: 43 ft (13 m)
- Established: 1959
- Administrator: Maryland Department of Natural Resources
- Designation: Maryland state park
- Website: Official website

Gunpowder Falls State Park is a Maryland state park comprising six non-contiguous areas covering 15,088 acres (6,106 ha) in northeastern Baltimore County and western Harford County, Maryland. The park is primarily made up of the stream valleys of the Big and Little Gunpowder Falls and the Gunpowder River; its natural features range from tidal marshes to rugged interior slopes. The park has over 120 miles of trails for hiking, biking, horseback riding, and cross-country skiing plus facilities for picnicking, tubing, canoeing and kayaking, tide-water fishing and crabbing, fly fishing, and hunting, among other activities. It is managed by the Maryland Department of Natural Resources.

== History ==
The park was established in 1959 to protect the Gunpowder River and the Big and Little Gunpowder Falls, with purchases of the first properties that would make up the park occurring in 1960.

== Park areas ==
Park areas are accessible at various exits off Interstate 83, Interstate 695, and Interstate 95.

Hereford Area
The 3,620-acre (1,460 ha) Hereford Area is a state-designated wildlands area located below the Prettyboy Reservoir. Recreational opportunities include 20 miles (32 km) of hiking and horseback riding trails, kayaking and canoeing, trout fishing, and youth group camping. The Mill Pond Cottage provides accommodations.
Sweet Air Area
The Sweet Air Area has 18 miles (29 km) of multi-use trails along the Little Gunpowder Falls on the border between Baltimore and Harford counties.
Torrey C. Brown Rail Trail
The converted rail trail extends 19.7 miles (31.7 km) north from Ashland (near Cockeysville) to the Pennsylvania state line. The Sparks Bank Nature Center is located along the trail in Sparks, Maryland, and has interpretive displays and family activities on summer weekends.
Central Area
The Central Area borders the Big and Little Gunpowder Falls. It includes the historic Jerusalem Mill Village and the site of the 19th-century Joppa Iron Works. Recreational features include multi-use trails, fishing, river paddling, and youth group camping. The former Baltimore Area Council scout camp, Camp Cone is now a campsite near the Sweathouse area of the central area.
Hammerman Area
The Hammerman Area offers a 1,500-foot (460 m) swimming beach, picnicking areas, trails, fishing opportunities, and an archery range.
Dundee Creek Marina
The Dundee Creek Marina is located near the mouth of the Gunpowder River. Marina services include fuel pumps, wet and dry slip leases, boat rentals, and store.
