= Bon Air (Fallston, Maryland) =

Historic house in Maryland

- U.S. National Register of Historic Places
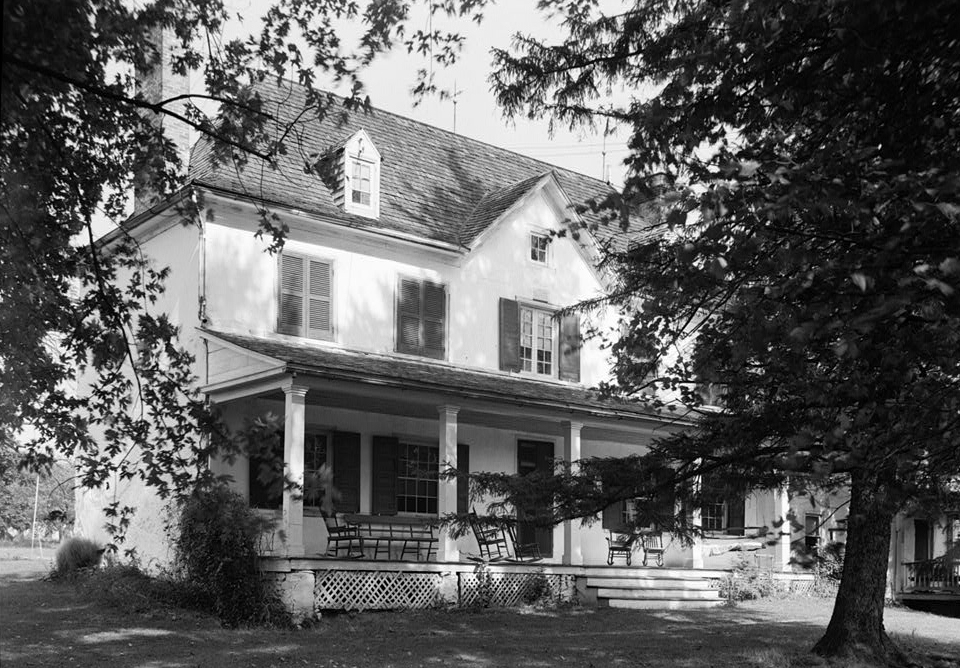
- Bon Air in 1936

- Location within Maryland Location within the United States
- Location: Laurel Brook Road, Fallston, Maryland
- Coordinates: 39°30′28″N 76°25′0″W
- Area: 26.1 acres (10.6 ha)
- Built: 1794
- Built by: de la Porte, Francois
- NRHP reference No.: 77000697
- Added to NRHP: November 10, 1977

Bon Air is a historic home located at Fallston, Harford County, Maryland. It is a three-story dwelling of stone, stuccoed and scored in imitation of ashlar, with a steep hipped roof featuring a pronounced splay or "kick" at the eaves. It was built in 1794 by Francois de la Porte, who brought his own joiners, blacksmiths, masons, and artisans with him to recreate an exact replica of a rural seat in Northern France. It is one of the few structures in Harford County with a distinct French heritage.

It was listed on the National Register of Historic Places in 1977.
