= Olney (Joppa, Maryland) =

Historic house in Maryland, United States

- U.S. National Register of Historic Places
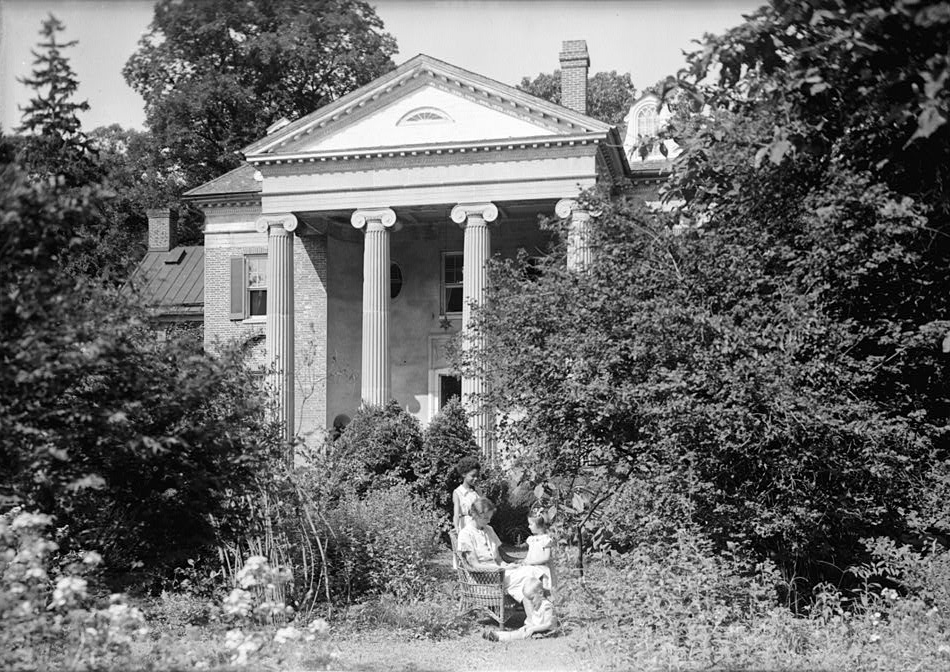
- Olney in 1936

- Location within Maryland Location within the United States
- Location: 1001 Old Joppa Rd., Joppa, Maryland
- Coordinates: 39°28′39″N 76°22′11″W
- Area: 264 acres (107 ha)
- Built: 1720
- Architect: Multiple
- Architectural style: Federal
- NRHP reference No.: 87001197
- Added to NRHP: July 9, 1987

Olney, originally patented as Prospect, is a historic home and farm complex located at Joppa, Harford County, Maryland. It is a 264-acre (1.07 km^{2}) working pony farm with a collection of 15 structures ranging in style, use, and elegance. The main building on the property is a 2 1/2-story brick house dating to 1810, generally called "the mansion." The house was evolved into a museum of Maryland architecture, with salvaged features from demolished buildings in Baltimore and Philadelphia. These include paneling from the Isaac Van Bibber house in Fells Point, Baltimore dating to 1815; the marble Ionic portico from William Small's Baltimore Athenaeum from 1830; and a marble bas-relief plaque designed by Pierre L'Enfant for Robert Morris's great 1795 house in Philadelphia. Also on the property is an early-18th-century, 2 1/2-story stone dwelling and a variety of still-functioning farm structures that in themselves range in style from simple stone stables and frame hay barns to an unusual two-story brick blacksmith's shop. In addition, the 1914 Wilna School was moved onto the property in 1980 and re-outfitted as St. Alban's Anglican Church. The property was developed by J. Alexis Shriver (1872–1951), a man prominent in local and state historical and agricultural matters who lived at Olney from 1890 until his death.

It was listed on the National Register of Historic Places in 1987.
