= Little Falls Meetinghouse =

Historic church in Maryland, United States

- U.S. National Register of Historic Places
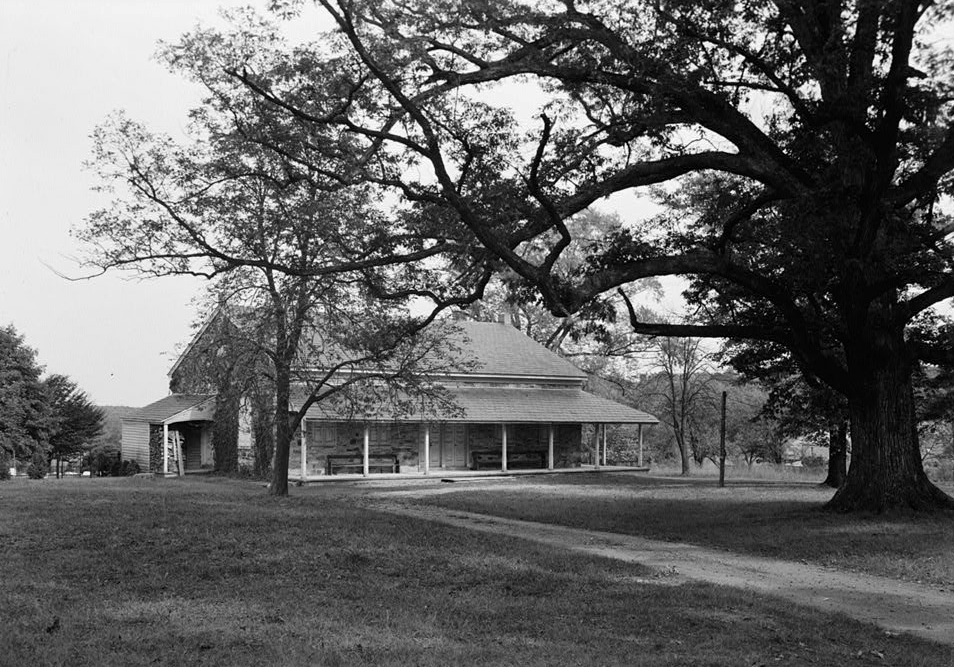
- Little Falls Meetinghouse in 1936

- Location within Maryland Location within the United States
- Location: Old Fallston Rd., Fallston, Maryland
- Coordinates: 39°30′33″N 76°24′23″W
- Area: 3.4 acres (1.4 ha)
- Built: 1843
- NRHP reference No.: 80001818
- Added to NRHP: May 7, 1980

The Little Falls Meetinghouse is a historic Friends meeting house located at Fallston, Harford County, Maryland, United States. It was constructed in 1843 and is a sprawling one-story fieldstone structure with shallow-pitched gable roof and a shed-roofed porch. The building replaced an earlier meetinghouse built in 1773. Also on the property is a cemetery and a one-story frame mid-19th century school building, with additions made post-1898 and in 1975. It features the characteristic two entrance doors and a sliding partition dividing the interior into the men's and women's sides. The Friends currently meet on the former men's side of the meetinghouse, and the women's side is only used for large groups and special occasions.

The Little Falls Meetinghouse was listed on the National Register of Historic Places in 1980.

== Notable people ==
- Elisha Tyson, devoted emancipator and abolitionist
- Martha Ellicott Tyson, Quaker elder, author and co-founder of Swarthmore College
