= Old Town Friends' Meetinghouse =

Historic church in Maryland, United States

- U.S. National Register of Historic Places
- Baltimore City Landmark
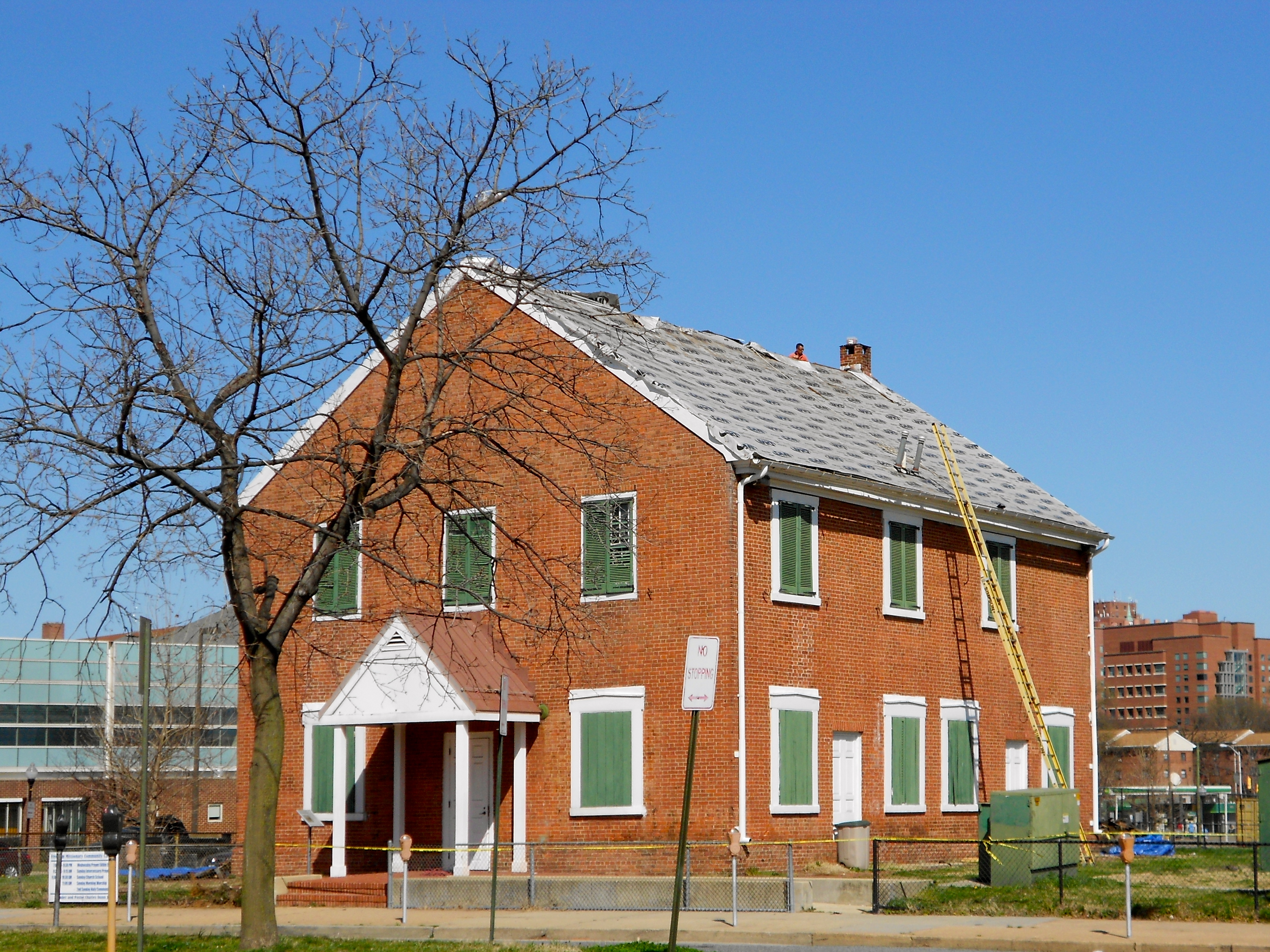
- Meetinghouse in March 2012
- Interactive map of Old Town Friends' Meetinghouse
- Location: 1201 East Fayette St., Baltimore, Maryland
- Coordinates: 39°17′31″N 76°36′4″W
- Area: 1.1 acres (0.45 ha)
- Built: 1781
- Built by: Mathews, George
- NRHP reference No.: 73002192

Significant dates
- Added to NRHP: March 30, 1973
- Designated BCL: 1975

Old Town Friends' Meetinghouse, also known as Aisquith Street Meeting or Baltimore Meeting, is a historic Quaker meeting house located at Baltimore, Maryland, United States. It is a two-story brick building which has undergone several alterations over the years. It is the oldest religious building in the city, having been built in 1781 by contractor George Mathews.

Old Town Friends' Meetinghouse was listed on the National Register of Historic Places in 1973.
