= Fallston, Maryland =

- Census-designated place
- Location of Fallston, Maryland
- Coordinates: 39°31′55″N 76°26′17″W
- Country: United States
- State: Maryland
- County: Harford

Area
  - Total: 14.02 sq mi (36.32 km^{2})
  - Land: 14.00 sq mi (36.26 km^{2})
  - Water: 0.027 sq mi (0.07 km^{2})
- Elevation: 466 ft (142 m)

Population (2020)
  - Total: 9,306
  - Density: 664.8/sq mi (256.68/km^{2})
- Time zone: UTC−5 (Eastern (EST))
  - Summer (DST): UTC−4 (EDT)
- ZIP code: 21047
- Area codes: 410, 443
- FIPS code: 24-27700
- GNIS feature ID: 0584343

Fallston is a census-designated place (CDP) in Harford County, Maryland, United States. The population was 8,958 at the 2010 census, up from 8,427 in 2000. Fallston is a semi-rural community consisting mostly of farms and suburban-like developments.

== Geography ==
Fallston is located in western Harford County at 39°31′55″N 76°26′17″W (39.532006, −76.438021). It is bordered to the south by Baltimore County and to the northeast by the Bel Air North CDP. The Little Gunpowder Falls river forms the southern border of the Fallston CDP and the county line, while Winters Run forms the border with Bel Air North.

Maryland Route 152 is the main road through Fallston, leading southeast 6 miles (10 km) to Interstate 95 at Exit 74 and northwest 7 miles (11 km) to Maryland Route 146 near Jarrettsville. The original community of Fallston is in the southeastern part of the CDP on Old Fallston Road just southwest of MD 152, and the CDP extends northwest along MD 152 to Hess Road and Engle Road. Maryland Route 165 passes through the west side of the Fallston CDP, crossing MD 152 at Upper Crossroads, and leads north 4 miles (6 km) to Jarrettsville and south four miles to Baldwin in Baltimore County. Fallston is 30 miles (48 km) northeast of downtown Baltimore via MD 152 and I-95.

According to the United States Census Bureau, the Fallston CDP has a total area of 14.0 square miles (36.3 km^{2}), of which 0.03 square miles (0.07 km^{2}), or 0.20%, are water.

Bon Air, Little Falls Meetinghouse and Rockdale are listed on the National Register of Historic Places.

== Demographics ==
Historical population
Census	Pop.	Note	%±
2000	8,427		—
2010	8,958		6.3%
2020	9,306		3.9%
U.S. Decennial Census

=== 2020 census ===
As of the 2020 census, Fallston had a population of 9,306. The median age was 45.4 years. 22.9% of residents were under the age of 18 and 21.7% of residents were 65 years of age or older. For every 100 females there were 99.4 males, and for every 100 females age 18 and over there were 99.5 males age 18 and over.

62.0% of residents lived in urban areas, while 38.0% lived in rural areas.

There were 3,215 households in Fallston, of which 34.3% had children under the age of 18 living in them. Of all households, 73.0% were married-couple households, 9.6% were households with a male householder and no spouse or partner present, and 14.0% were households with a female householder and no spouse or partner present. About 13.5% of all households were made up of individuals and 8.3% had someone living alone who was 65 years of age or older.

There were 3,304 housing units, of which 2.7% were vacant. The homeowner vacancy rate was 0.3% and the rental vacancy rate was 8.4%.

Racial composition as of the 2020 census
Race	Number	Percent
White	8,491	91.2%
Black or African American	97	1.0%
American Indian and Alaska Native	24	0.3%
Asian	178	1.9%
Native Hawaiian and Other Pacific Islander	2	0.0%
Some other race	43	0.5%
Two or more races	471	5.1%
Hispanic or Latino (of any race)	203	2.2%

=== 2000 census ===
As of the census of 2000, there were 8,427 people, 2,875 households, and 2,550 families residing in the CDP. The population density was 600.9 inhabitants per square mile (232.0/km^{2}). There were 2,906 housing units at an average density of 207.2 per square mile (80.0/km^{2}). The racial makeup of the CDP was 97.33% White, 0.76% African American, 0.12% Native American, 1.10% Asian, 0.09% from other races, and 0.59% from two or more races including Hispanic or Latino.

There were 2,875 households, out of which 37.3% had children under the age of 18 living with them, 81.5% were married couples living together, 5.3% had a female householder with no husband present, and 11.3% were non-families. 9.6% of all households were made up of individuals, and 3.5% had someone living alone who was 65 years of age or older. The average household size was 2.93 and the average family size was 3.13.

In the CDP, the population was spread out, with 25.8% under the age of 18, 5.5% from 18 to 24, 23.0% from 25 to 44, 34.8% from 45 to 64, and 10.9% who were 65 years of age or older. The median age was 43 years. For every 100 females, there were 98.6 males. For every 100 females age 18 and over, there were 95.2 males.

The median income for a household in the CDP was $84,296, and the median income for a family was $87,686. Males had a median income of $62,112 versus $37,500 for females. The per capita income for the CDP was $31,093. About 2.2% of families and 2.3% of the population were below the poverty line, including 3.4% of those under age 18 and 2.4% of those age 65 or over.

== Notable areas ==
Despite being mostly residential, the Humane Society of Harford County is located here.

== Notable people ==
- Joe Barger, indoor/outdoor soccer player
- Jim Hunter, broadcaster formerly with the Baltimore Orioles
- Fred Manfra, retired Orioles broadcaster
- Melvin Mora, retired Major League Baseball player
- Gerry Sandusky, 11 News sportscaster WBAL-TV and Baltimore Ravens radio broadcaster
