= Edgewood, Maryland =

- Census-designated place
- Location of Edgewood, Maryland
- Coordinates: 39°25′07″N 76°17′40″W
- Country: United States
- State: Maryland
- County: Harford

Area
  - Total: 17.24 sq mi (44.64 km^{2})
  - Land: 17.10 sq mi (44.30 km^{2})
  - Water: 0.13 sq mi (0.34 km^{2})
- Elevation: 52 ft (16 m)

Population (2020)
  - Total: 25,713
  - Density: 1,503.4/sq mi (580.46/km^{2})
- Time zone: UTC−5 (Eastern (EST))
  - Summer (DST): UTC−4 (EDT)
- ZIP Code: 21040
- Area code: 410
- FIPS code: 24-25150

Edgewood is an unincorporated community and census-designated place (CDP) in Harford County, Maryland, United States. The population was 25,562 at the 2010 census, up from 23,378 in 2000.

== Geography ==
Edgewood is located in southwestern Harford County. It is bordered to the west by Baltimore County, Joppatowne, to the north by Bel Air South, to the east by the Bush River, an arm of the Chesapeake Bay, to the south by the Edgewood Arsenal portion of Aberdeen Proving Ground, and to the southwest by the tidal Gunpowder River, another arm of the Chesapeake.

Interstate 95 forms the northern border of the Edgewood CDP and provides access from Exit 74 (Maryland Route 152) and Exit 77 (Maryland Route 24). I-95 leads southwest 25 miles (40 km) to Baltimore and northeast 50 miles (80 km) to Wilmington, Delaware. U.S. Route 40 (Pulaski Highway) runs through the northern part of Edgewood, parallel to I-95. US 40 leads southwest 9 miles (14 km) to White Marsh and the same distance northeast to Aberdeen. Maryland Route 24 begins at an entrance to Aberdeen Proving Ground in the southern part of the CDP and leads 10 miles (16 km) north to Bel Air, the Harford County seat.

According to the United States Census Bureau, the Edgewood CDP has a total area of 17.9 square miles (46.4 km^{2}), of which 17.8 square miles (46.1 km^{2}) are land and 0.2 square miles (0.4 km^{2}), or 0.77%, are water.

== Demographics ==
Historical population
Census	Pop.	Note	%±
2000	23,378		—
2010	25,562		9.3%
2020	25,713		0.6%
U.S. Decennial Census

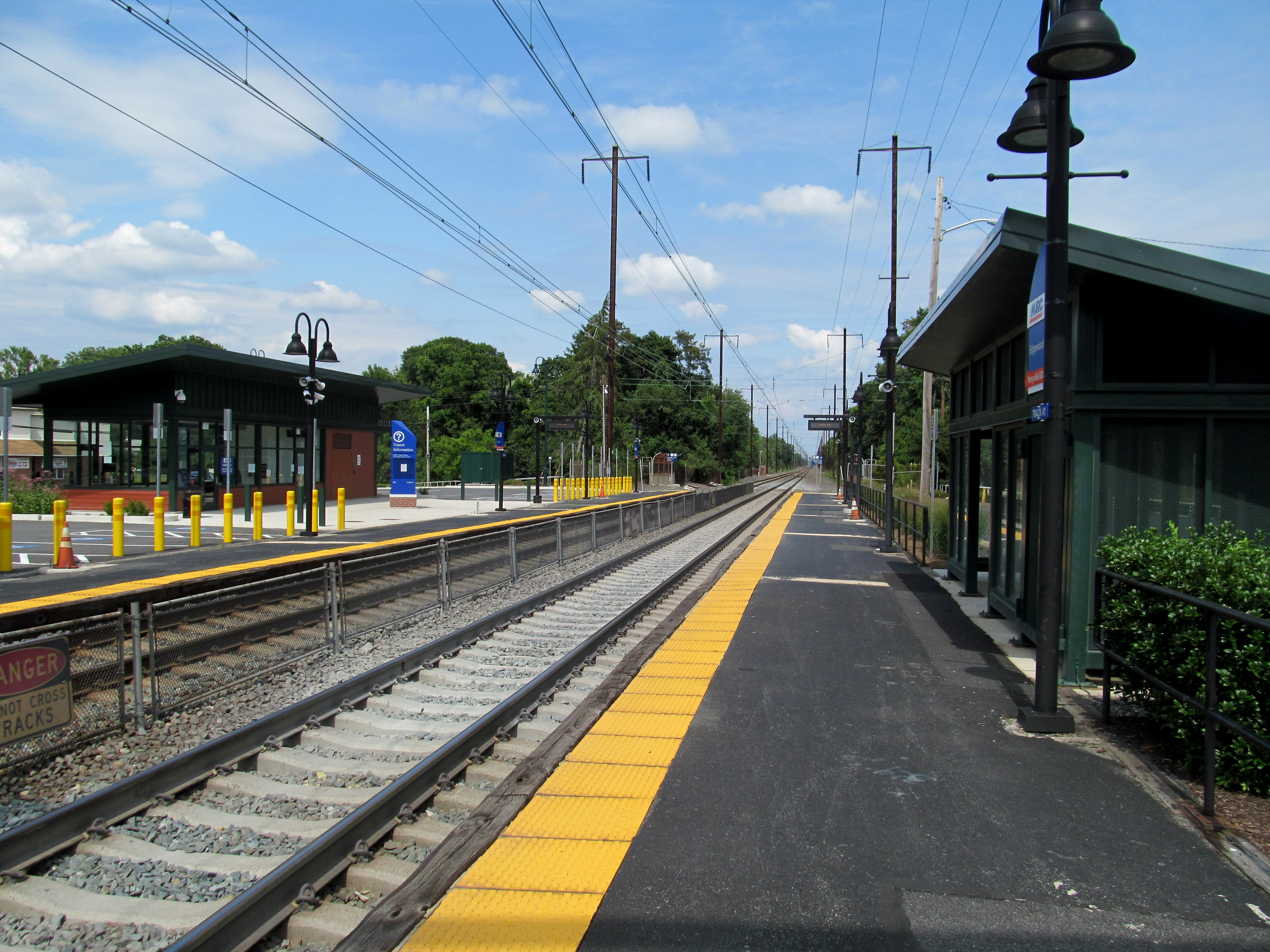
Edgewood station, which is served by MARC Train commuter rail service to Baltimore and Washington DC

=== 2020 census ===
As of the 2020 census, Edgewood had a population of 25,713. The median age was 34.7 years. 27.6% of residents were under the age of 18 and 11.9% of residents were 65 years of age or older. For every 100 females there were 89.3 males, and for every 100 females age 18 and over there were 85.0 males age 18 and over.

99.7% of residents lived in urban areas, while 0.3% lived in rural areas.

There were 9,206 households in Edgewood, of which 38.1% had children under the age of 18 living in them. Of all households, 39.0% were married-couple households, 17.6% were households with a male householder and no spouse or partner present, and 35.2% were households with a female householder and no spouse or partner present. About 23.3% of all households were made up of individuals and 7.7% had someone living alone who was 65 years of age or older.

There were 9,885 housing units, of which 6.9% were vacant. The homeowner vacancy rate was 2.3% and the rental vacancy rate was 7.8%.

Racial composition as of the 2020 census
Race	Number	Percent
White	9,893	38.5%
Black or African American	11,547	44.9%
American Indian and Alaska Native	123	0.5%
Asian	405	1.6%
Native Hawaiian and Other Pacific Islander	27	0.1%
Some other race	1,418	5.5%
Two or more races	2,300	8.9%
Hispanic or Latino (of any race)	2,642	10.3%

=== 2000 census ===
As of the census of 2000, there were 23,378 people, 8,299 households, and 6,224 families living in the CDP. The population density was 1,303.9 inhabitants per square mile (503.4/km^{2}). There were 8,834 housing units at an average density of 492.7 per square mile (190.2/km^{2}). The racial makeup of the CDP was 68.10% White, 25.66% African American, 0.40% Native American, 1.64% Asian, 0.09% Pacific Islander, 1.40% from other races, and 2.70% from two or more races. Hispanic or Latino of any race were 3.40% of the population.

There were 8,299 households, out of which 43.9% had children under the age of 18 living with them, 50.2% were married couples living together, 19.3% had a female householder with no husband present, and 25.0% were non-families. 19.6% of all households were made up of individuals, and 4.3% had someone living alone who was 65 years of age or older. The average household size was 2.81 and the average family size was 3.21.

In the CDP, the population was spread out, with 32.2% under the age of 18, 9.0% from 18 to 24, 33.0% from 25 to 44, 19.6% from 45 to 64, and 6.3% who were 65 years of age or older. The median age was 31 years. For every 100 females, there were 92.6 males. For every 100 females age 18 and over, there were 87.5 males.

The median income for a household in the CDP was $47,150, and the median income for a family was $50,276. Males had a median income of $36,076 versus $27,214 for females. The per capita income for the CDP was $17,943. About 8.5% of families and 10.3% of the population were below the poverty line including 14.8% of those under age 18 and 9.3% of those age 65 or over.

== Education ==
The Harford County Board of Education, under the jurisdiction of the State of Maryland, provides services to educate the residents of Edgewood and its surrounding neighborhoods within the official boundaries established by the county. Edgewood has several elementary schools (Edgewood Elementary and Deerfield Elementary), a middle school (Edgewood Middle), and a newly rebuilt high school (Edgewood High School). Edgewood High School is home to two special magnet programs, the International Baccalaureate Diploma Program and the Academy of Finance.

There are several parochial schools in the Edgewood area including the Trinity Lutheran School, which is a Christian school that provides an education for students from Pre-K to the 8th grade. The Trinity Lutheran Christian School is a member of the Carbon Disclosure Project (CDP). In 2017 the school lost its right to participate in Maryland's school voucher program, Broadening Options and Opportunities for Students Today (BOOST), because it had maintained the right to prevent gay and lesbian students in the school's handbook.

== Notable people ==
- Richard Chizmar, Best selling author of Chasing the Boogeyman and other books
- Brandon Albert, former offensive guard for the Miami Dolphins of the NFL
- B. Daniel Riley, former Maryland state legislator
- Johnathon Schaech, actor, born in Edgewood in 1969
- Zach Thornton, former goalie for Chicago Fire of Major League Soccer, born in Edgewood in 1973
- Frank Zappa, former composer, musician, and film director, lived in the area from the late 1940s to the early 1950s when his father was employed at Edgewood Arsenal

== See also ==
- Edgewood Arsenal human experiments
- Edgewood Chemical Activity
- Edgewood Chemical Biological Center
