= List of covered bridges in Maryland =

Below is a list of covered bridges in Maryland. There are six authentic covered bridges in the U.S. state of Maryland of which five are historic. A covered bridge is considered authentic not due to its age, but by its construction. An authentic bridge is constructed using trusses rather than other methods such as stringers, a popular choice for non-authentic covered bridges.

== Bridges ==
Name	Image	County	Location	Built	Length	Crosses	Ownership	Truss	Notes
Foxcatcher Farm Covered Bridge	Foxcatcher Farm Covered Bridge	Cecil	Fair Hill; 39°42′35″N 75°50′15″W	ca. 1860	80 feet (24 m)	Big Elk Creek		Multiple king and arch	Civil engineering landmark designated by the Maryland section in 1994.
Gilpin's Falls Covered Bridge	Gilpin's Falls Covered Bridge	Cecil	North East; 39°38′55.8″N 75°57′20.1″W	ca. 1855	119 feet (36 m)	North East Creek	County of Cecil	Burr	
Jericho Covered Bridge	Bridge	Baltimore and Harford	Jerusalem and Kingsville; 39°27′34″N 76°23′16″W	1865, 1937	88 feet (27 m)	Little Gunpowder Falls	Counties of Baltimore and Harford	Burr	
Loys Station Covered Bridge	Loys Station Covered Bridge	Frederick	Thurmont; 39°36′26″N 77°21′8″W	ca. 1860, rebuilt 1994	90 feet (27 m)	Owens Creek	County of Frederick	Multiple king	Original bridge destroyed by arson in 1991
Roddy Road Covered Bridge	Roddy Road Covered Bridge	Frederick	Thurmont; 39°38′26″N 77°23′39″W	ca. 1860, rebuilt 2017	39 feet (12 m)	Owens Creek	County of Frederick	King	
Utica Covered Bridge	Utica Covered Bridge	Frederick	Thurmont; 39°31′28″N 77°23′46″W	ca. 1860	100 feet (30 m)	Fishing Creek	County of Frederick	Burr	

== See also ==
- List of bridges on the National Register of Historic Places in Maryland
- World Guide to Covered Bridges
