= Gilmor's Raid =

Coordinates: 39°34′36″N 77°0′0″W

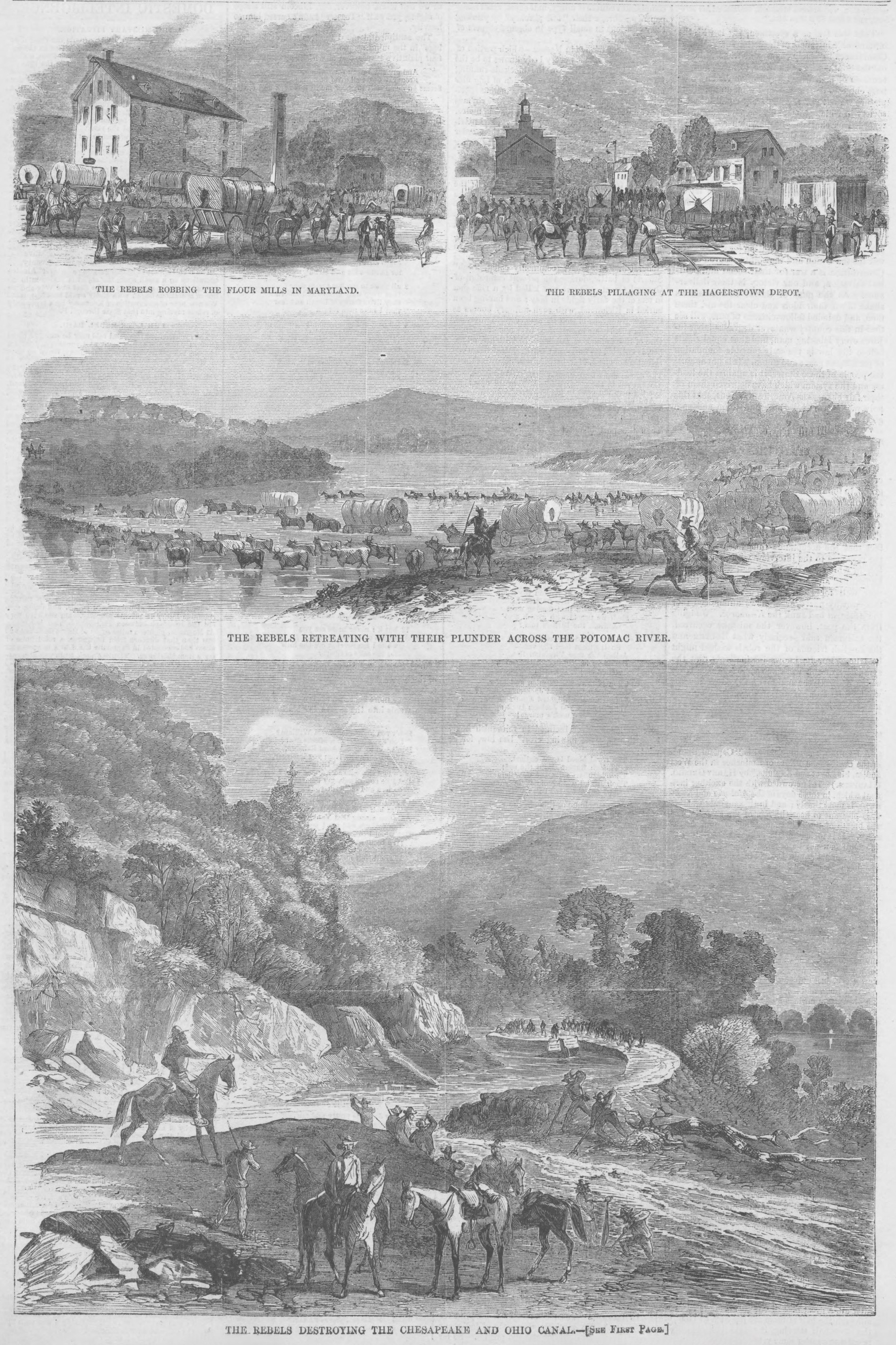
Scenes from the Gilmor's raid in Harper's Weekly magazine, 1864

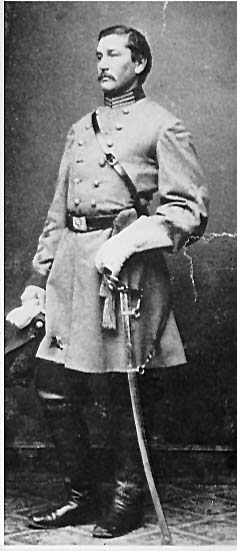
Harry W. Gilmor

Gilmor's Raid, also known as The Magnolia Station Train Raid, was a foraging and disruptive cavalry raid that was part of an overall campaign against Union railroads, led by Maj. Harry W. Gilmor with 135 men from the First and Second Maryland Cavalry regiments. It was authorized by Confederate Lt. Gen. Jubal Early during his Valley Campaigns of 1864, which threatened Washington, D.C., during the American Civil War.

== Events on July 9–10 ==
As Early advanced north and east toward Baltimore, Maryland, a Union force led by Maj. Gen. Lew Wallace met Early's forces and was defeated in the Battle of Monocacy on July 9, 1864. The cavalry brigade of the Second Corps, led by Brig. Gen. Bradley T. Johnson advanced further eastward into Maryland, led by cavalry forces under the command of Maj. Harry W. Gilmor. Upon reaching Westminster, Maryland, on July 10, Gilmor attacked Union cavalry forces, driving them out. Johnson's main cavalry force continued pressing Wallace's retreating Union troops, pursuing them into Cockeysville-Hunt Valley, Maryland, north of Baltimore, and then turned south destroying tracks and trestle bridges along the Northern Central Railway. Upon reaching Timonium, Maryland, Johnson divided the Second Corps cavalry brigade. He sent the commander of 2nd Maryland Cavalry, Maj. Gilmor, with a 135 detachment made up of both the 1st and 2nd Maryland Cavalry southeastward. The second part of Johnson's cavalry simultaneously turned south and headed toward the prison camp at Point Lookout, Maryland at the confluence of the Potomac River and the Chesapeake Bay.

== Events on July 11 ==
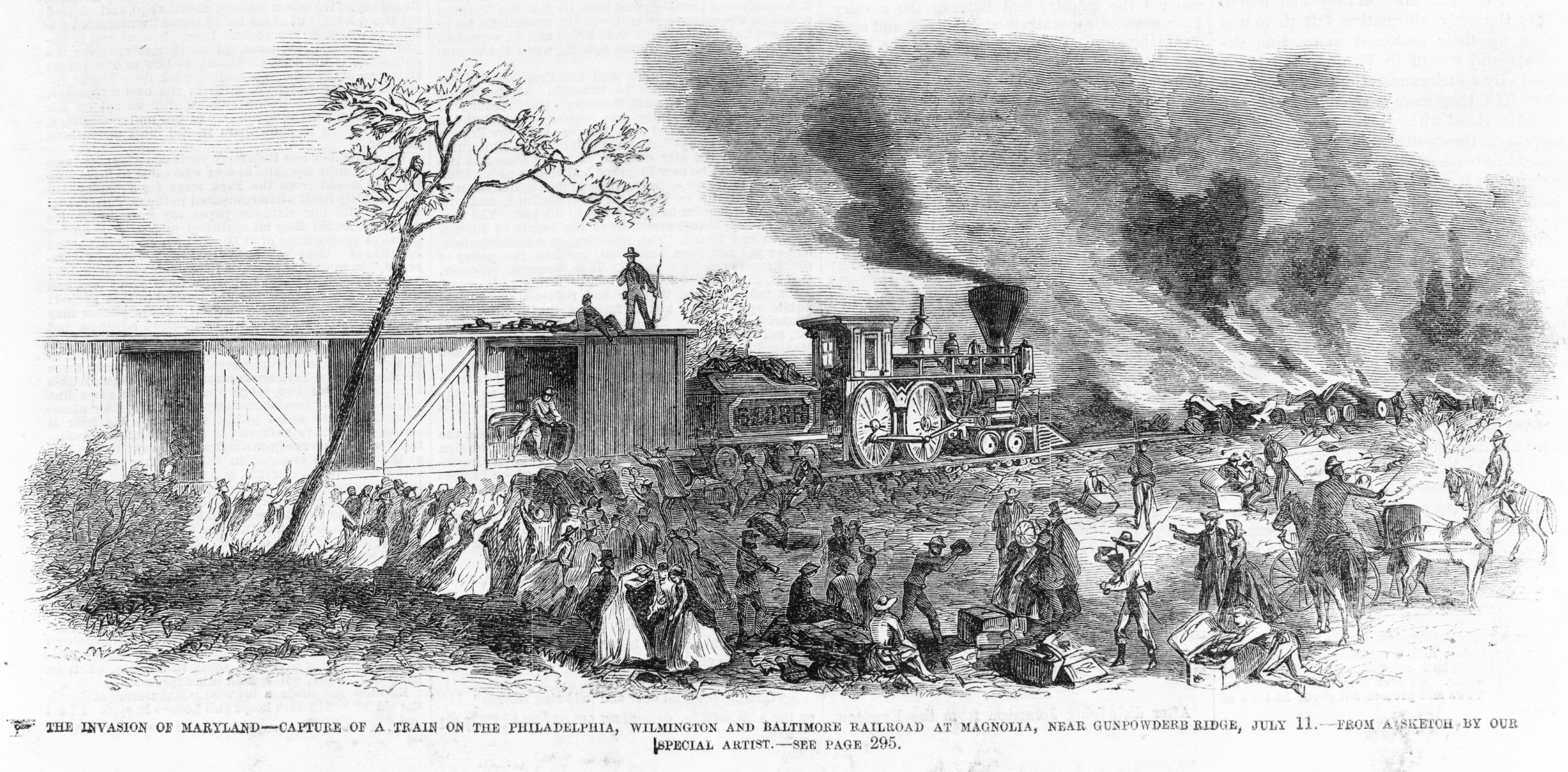
Capture of a train on the Philadelphia, Wilmington and Baltimore Railroad at Magnolia, July 11

Maj. Gilmor's cavalry detachment moved undetected through Baltimore County, Maryland, and into Harford County, Maryland. They first stopped at the General Store in Jerusalem Mill now popularly known as McCourtney's, capturing supplies and horses, and then arrived on the morning of July 11 at the Gunpowder River bridge, a railroad bridge near Magnolia Station, close to Joppa, Maryland, which belonged to the Philadelphia, Wilmington and Baltimore Railroad. Defending the railroad bridge at both ends were seventy troops from the 159th Ohio Infantry. Gilmor's troops captured two trains, one north- and one southbound, evacuated the passengers, captured supplies on the train, and set fire to one of the trains before backing it over and partially destroying the railroad trestle bridge. The telegraph communications lines were also cut along the bridge. Among the passengers captured on the northbound train was Union Maj. Gen. William B. Franklin, who was taken as a prisoner of war back to Virginia. After completing the actions at Magnolia Station, Gilmor's men headed back west, across Baltimore County, and stopped at Ady's Hotel, near Towson, Maryland to rest and refresh his men. Shortly afterward a large cavalry patrol from Baltimore arrived, which outnumbered Gilmor's men more than two to one. Gilmor attacked and defeated the Union cavalry patrol, and pursued them as far as Govanstown. Gilmor later claimed that if his men had not been so tired, he would have gone into Baltimore and captured the city. Gilmor's detachment then proceeded back through Green Spring Valley, to recover his prisoner, Gen. Franklin, who had escaped. After resting for a few hours, Gilmor's detachment rejoined Gen. Early's main forces as they crossed the Potomac River back into Virginia. On the 11th, the Confederates also burned the home of Maryland Governor Augustus Bradford. There is a state historic marker near the site.

== Aftermath ==
Only one man was lost in Gilmor's detachment during the raid, Sgt. Field, who was shot at point blank range by Ishmael Day in a dispute near Day's residence in the thirteenth district of Baltimore. Sgt. Field was leading Gilmor's advance guard and refused to pass under a Union flag on the Day residence. Ishmael Day suddenly shot Sgt. Field and fled, and Gilmor's main party proceeded to burn the Day residence in retaliation.
