= Upper Falls =

Upper Falls may be:

== Waterfalls ==
United States

- Upper Yellowstone Falls on the Yellowstone River, Yellowstone National Park, Wyoming
- Upper Falls — a waterfall in Uvas Canyon County Park, California
- Upper Falls in Waterfalls of Montana

== Communities ==
United States

- Upper Falls, Baltimore County, Maryland
- Newton Upper Falls, Massachusetts in Middlesex County

United Kingdom

- Upper Falls, Northern Ireland
