= Harry Gilmor =

American policeman (1838–1883)

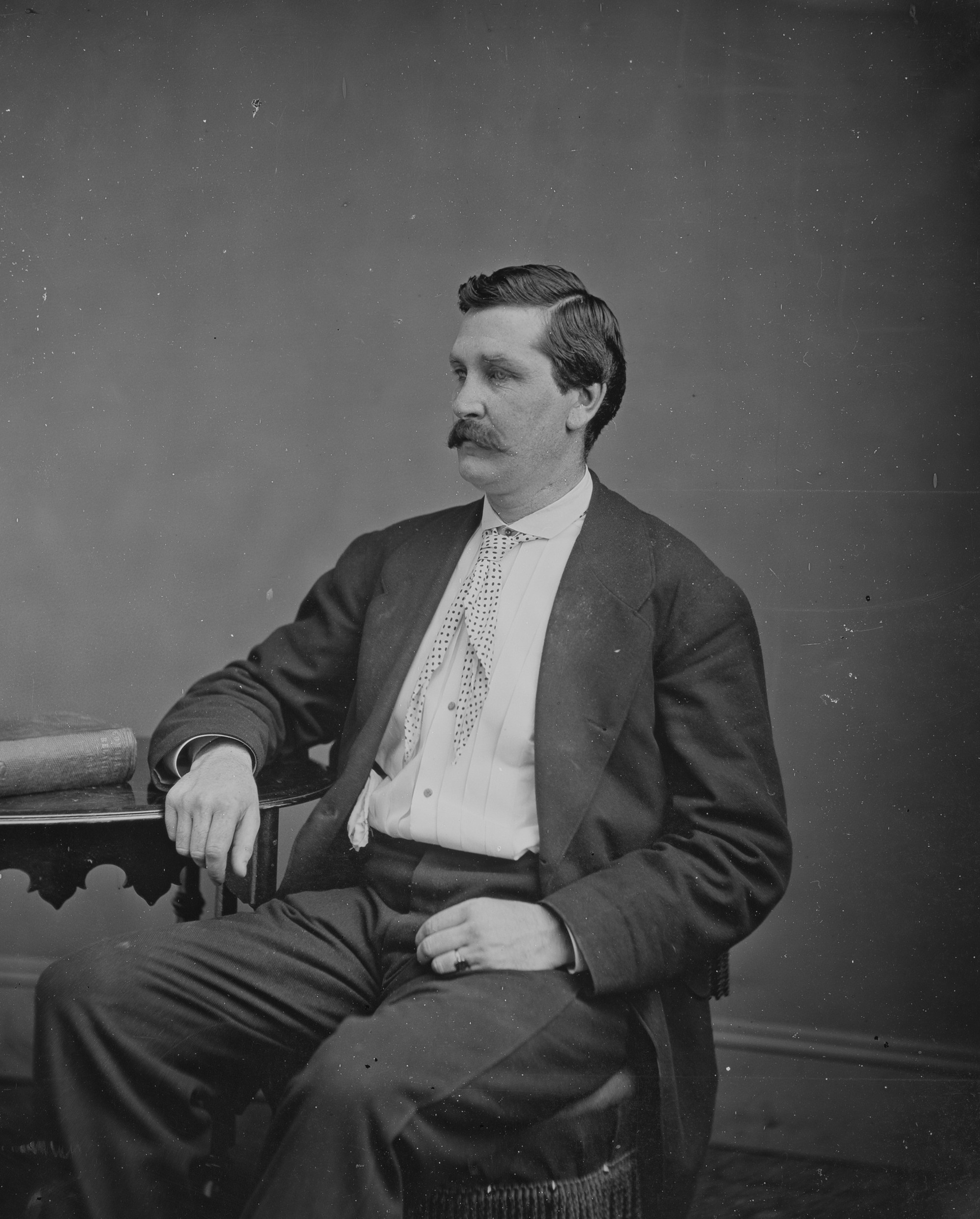
- Gilmor photographed by Mathew Brady, c. 1860.
- Born: January 24, 1838; Baltimore County, Maryland
- Died: March 4, 1883 (aged 45); Baltimore, Maryland
- Children: 3
- Military career
- Allegiance: Confederate States of America
- Branch: Confederate States Army
- Rank: Cavalry officer
- Conflicts: American Civil War: Gilmor's Raid; Battle of Monocacy

Harry Ward Gilmor (January 24, 1838 – March 4, 1883) served as the Baltimore City Police Commissioner, head of the Baltimore Police Department in the 1870s, and a Confederate cavalry officer during the American Civil War. Gilmor's daring raids, including Gilmor's Raid through northern and central Maryland in July 1864 during the third major Confederate invasion of the North gained his partisans fame as "Gilmor's Raiders".

== Early life ==
Gilmor was born at "Glen Ellen", the Jacobethan/English Tudor-styled "Castle" family estate, a 25 minute walk from present-day Providence Rd, (its ruins stand about 100 yards from the waters of the Loch Raven Reservoir), just north of Towson in central Baltimore County, Maryland. He was the son of Robert Gilmor and Ellen (Ward) Gilmor, daughter of Judge William H. Ward. Harry was the fifth of eleven children.

== Civil War ==
During the American Civil War, as a member of the "Baltimore County Horse Guards" under Captain Charles Carnan Ridgely, Jr.'s of Hampton Mansion, near present-day Towson, Maryland, Gilmor was arrested and imprisoned in Fort McHenry following the "Pratt Street Riots" of April 19th, 1861, with the subsequent occupation of Baltimore and Fort Federal Hill by Federal troops under Gen. Benjamin F. Butler of the 6th & 8th Massachusetts state militia in May 1861. Upon his release, he traveled South and eventually rejoined the fighting serving, for a while, under General Turner Ashby. He was again captured during the Maryland Campaign and spent five months in prison.

During the Gettysburg campaign of June – July, 1863, Gilmor was assigned command of the First Maryland Cavalry and Second Maryland Cavalry, supporting Brig. Gen. George Steuart's infantry brigade. Gilmor was the provost marshal of the town of Gettysburg while it was occupied by the Confederates July 1–4.

== Baltimore County/Magnolia Station Raid ==
As part of the third major Confederate invasion, this under commanding Gen. Jubal Early with several corps of troops on a mission to attack the national capital at Washington, D.C., and possibly liberate Southern prisoners-of-war at Camp Point Look-Out in southern Maryland at the confluence of the Chesapeake Bay and Potomac River in St. Mary's County.

After the Battle of Monocacy, along the Monocacy River on July 9, 1864, southeast of Frederick in Frederick County, Maryland, Colonel Gilmor's command, along with Frederick's Brig. Gen. Bradley T. Johnson's Maryland Confederate infantry and cavalry, made a series of raids around Baltimore going as far east as Magnolia Station in Harford County, Maryland and Fork, Maryland. On July 10, 1864, Major Harry Gilmor of the 2nd Maryland Cavalry was given 135 men of the 1st and 2nd Maryland, and directed to cross northern Baltimore Count, Maryland into Harford County at Jerusalem Mill, and destroy the railroad bridge of the Philadelphia, Wilmington and Baltimore Railroad at Magnolia Station, across the Gunpowder River, northeast of the city, in Harford County. In the meantime, while crossing his home county, he stopped and visited his family at the family estate "Glen Ellen", then near the former village of Warren, now beneath the surface of Loch Raven Reservoir. Early on July 11, Gilmor's advance group passed the home of Ishmael Day on Sunshine Avenue in Fork. Day, a strong Union sympathizer, had hung a large United States flag to greet Gilmor's troops. Sergeant Eugene Fields, a member of the advance guard unit, told Day to take the flag down. Day refused, so Sgt. Fields dismounted to do it himself. Day shot Fields at close range with a shotgun. Day immediately fled, hiding under an apple cider press for days until the passing troops were gone. Gilmor's men then burned Day's home and barn. Maj. Gilmor sent Sgt. Fields to Wright's Hotel, operated by W.O.B. Wright on the Harford Road, where he later died.

At about 8:40 in the morning on July 11, Gilmor's cavalrymen reached the station and proceeded to stop two northbound trains from Baltimore. After evacuating the passengers, the troopers set fire to the second train and backed it down the tracks and onto the bridge. The train burned through the draw section of the bridge and effected much damage to the area around it. Aboard the first train was a convalescing Union Maj. Gen. William B. Franklin. This raid was regarded as one of the most daring during the war by detached cavalry on either side.

== Later raids ==
Gilmor was eventually ordered to take his command to Hardy County, West Virginia, and attack the Baltimore and Ohio Railroad. There, he was captured on February 4, 1865, by Major Henry Young, chief of scouts for Major General Philip Sheridan, and was held as a prisoner of war at Fort Warren in Boston Harbor until July 24, 1865, three and a half months after Lee's surrender at Appomattox.

== Postbellum life ==
After the war, Gilmor moved to New Orleans, where he married Miss Mentoria Nixon Strong, daughter of Jasper Strong and Eliza Julia Nixon. Gilmor and his wife had three children.

Gilmor wrote his war memoirs, entitled "Four Years in the Saddle" (published in New York, Harper & Bros., 1866). He soon returned to Maryland and was elected a colonel of the cavalry in the reorganized Maryland National Guard. He also served as Police Commissioner for Baltimore from 1874 to 1879, a position in which his Civil War predecessor, Police Marshal George Proctor Kane, was serving when he was arrested by federal authorities in 1861. Kane was later elected Mayor of Baltimore.

== Death and legacy ==
Gilmor died in Baltimore, plagued by complications from a Civil War injury to his jaw. He was buried in Loudon Park Cemetery in the southwest section of Baltimore between Frederick Road and Wilkens Avenue, in an area of the cemetery now known as "Confederate Hill." At his death, the Baltimore Police Department's central and district stations flew their flags at half-staff. Gilmor's funeral was a large local ceremonial event with many dignitaries present to honor his war and civil service.

There is also a Gilmor Street laid out between Calhoun Street running south to Cole Street in West Baltimore's Upton, Sandtown-Winchester, Poppleton neighborhoods.

The Gilmor Homes, one of Baltimore's best known public housing projects, is named for the Gilmor family.
