= Franklinville, Baltimore County, Maryland =

Unincorporated community in Maryland, United States

Franklinville, Maryland
- Unincorporated community
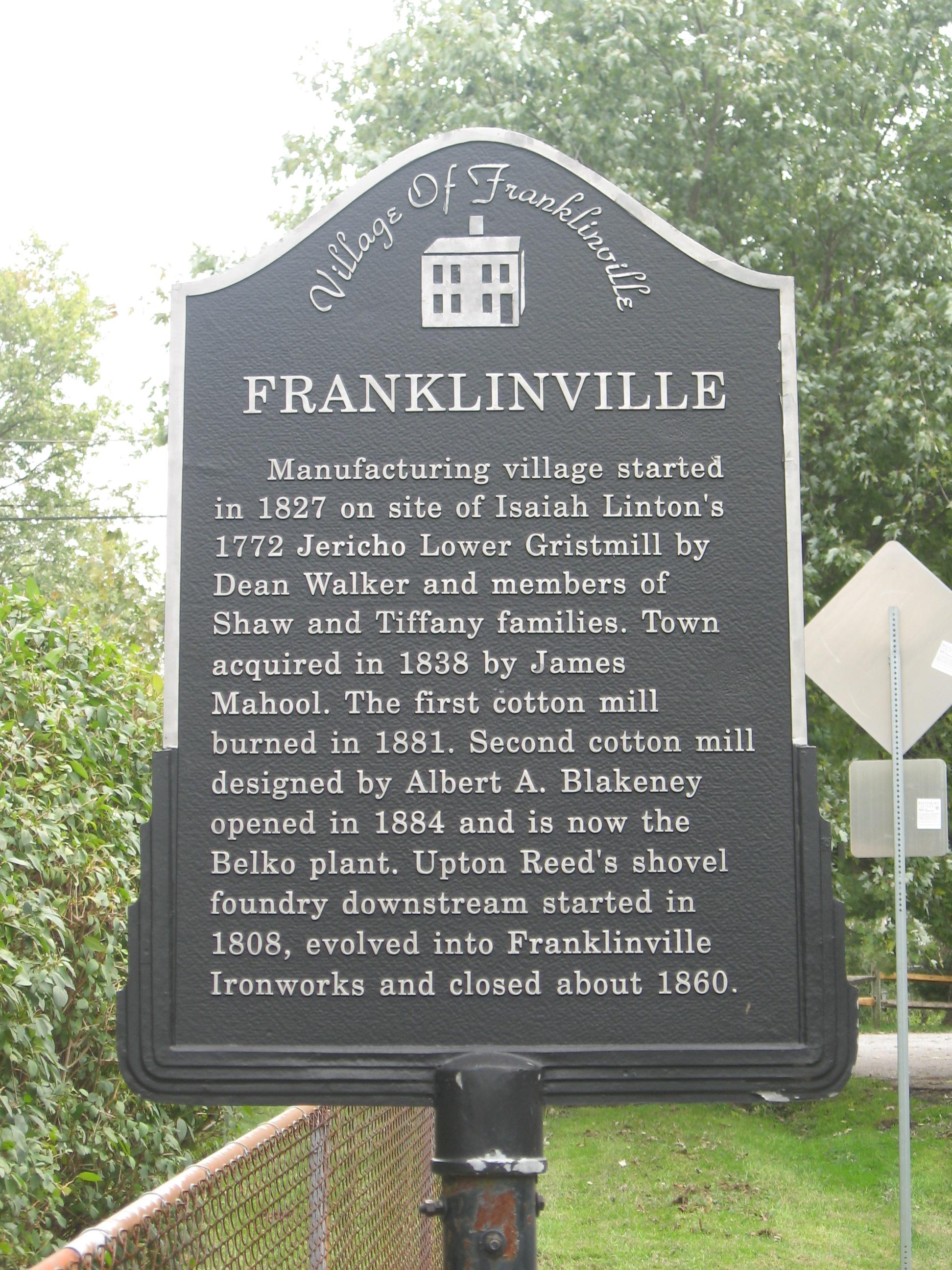
- Plaque commemorating the Village of Franklinville.

- Location within the State of Maryland Franklinville, Maryland (the United States)
- Coordinates: 39°26′52″N 76°23′05″W
- Country: United States
- State: Maryland
- County: Baltimore
- Time zone: UTC-5 (Eastern (EST))
  - Summer (DST): UTC-4 (EDT)
- ZIP codes: 21087
- GNIS feature ID: 590249

Franklinville is an unincorporated community in Baltimore County, Maryland, United States. southeast of Kingsville.
