= Fair Hill Natural Resources Management Area =

Hiking area in Maryland

Fair Hill Natural Resources Management Area is in Elkton, Maryland. It has 80 miles of trails. Fishing areas are available. There is a nature center and ruins to explore. It has long been an area used by equestrians. The Fair Hill Training Center for thoroughbred horses was built on the site in 1983.

The Foxcatcher Farm Covered Bridge, which is one of two covered bridges in Cecil County, is located on the property near the Fair Hill Nature and Environmental Center.

== See also ==
- Fair Hill, Maryland
- List of Maryland state parks#Maryland natural resources management areas
