= Foxcatcher Farm Covered Bridge =

Historic bridge in Maryland, United States

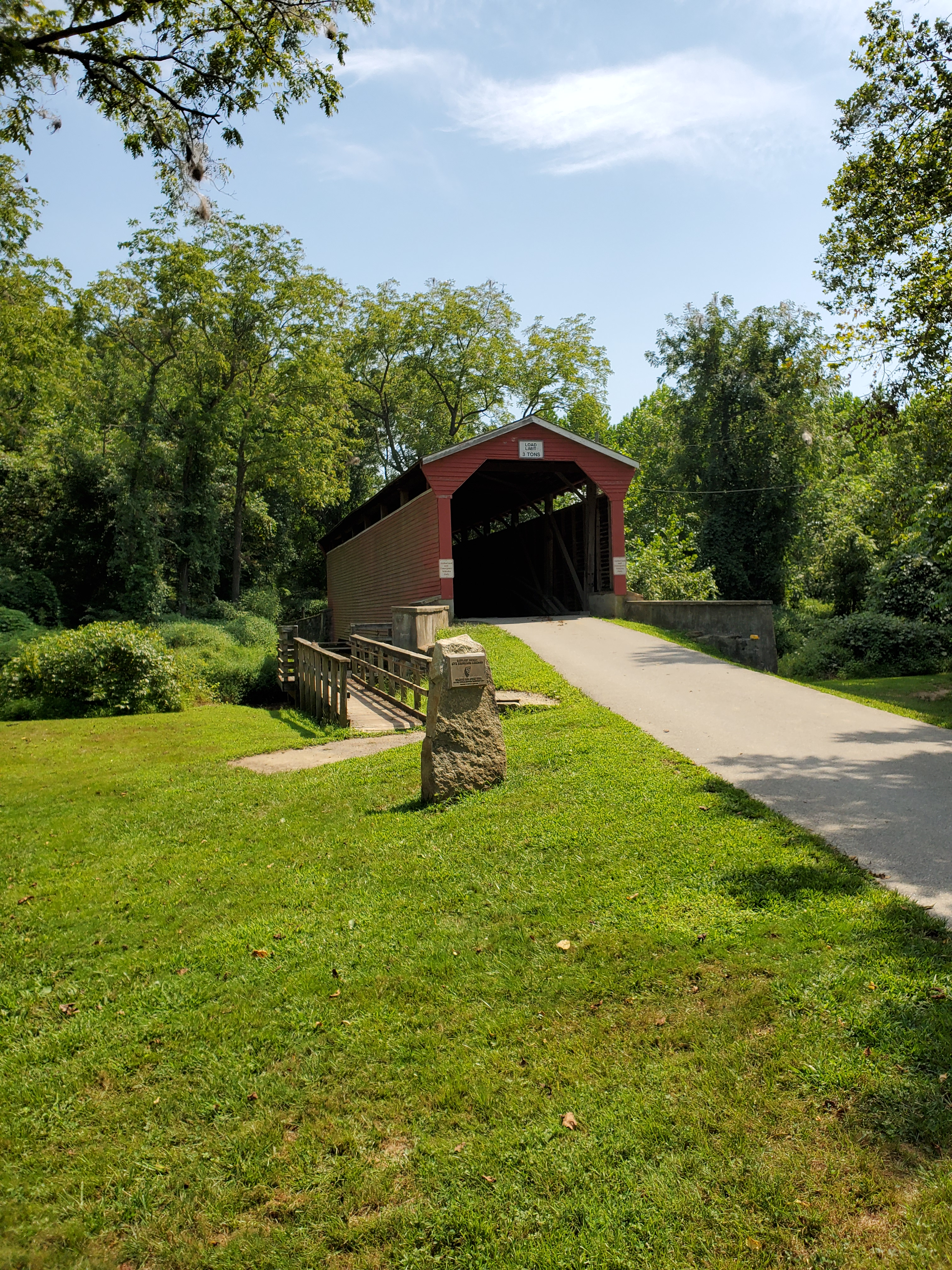
- The bridge in August 2019
- Coordinates: 39°42′35″N 75°50′15″W
- Carries: Tawes Drive
- Crosses: Big Elk Creek

Characteristics
- Total length: 80 feet 2 inches (24.4 m)
- Width: 12.1 ft (3.7 m)
- Longest span: 65.9 ft (20.1 m)
- Load limit: 3 short tons (2.7 t)

History
- Built: 1860
- Rebuilt: 1992

Location
- Interactive map of Foxcatcher Farm Covered Bridge

Foxcatcher Farm Covered Bridge, also known as Big Elk Creek Covered Bridge and Fair Hill Covered Bridge, is a Burr arch truss wooden covered bridge near Fair Hill, Maryland, United States. The bridge was originally built in 1860 and underwent substantial renovations in 1992. It is located within the Fair Hill Natural Resources Management Area near a former fox hunting lodge.

== History ==
The bridge crosses Big Elk Creek and is located within the Fair Hill Natural Resources Management Area, the former land holdings of William du Pont Jr. The crossing was originally called Strahorn's Mill Bridge after Strahorn's Mill - one of the properties purchased by William du Pont Jr. in 1927 to create his Foxcatcher Farm estate for his foxhounds, which also shared the name of his thoroughbred racing stable. During this period, the bridge was located on private property and was not accessible to the general public. In 1975, ten years after the death of William du Pont Jr., the State of Maryland purchased the estate and converted the property into public land managed by the Maryland Department of Natural Resources. The covered bridge is located near the Fair Hill Nature Center, a building that formerly served as a fox hunting lodge.

In May and June 1860, advertisements were placed in the Cecil Whig calling for bids to construct a new bridge over Big Elk Creek at Hill's Fording near Strahorn's Mill. These included detailed specifications for the crossing, called for the woodworking to employ either the "Burr" or "Canal" plan, and required the structure to be covered. A similar advertisement for building a bridge at the location was also placed in the Cecil Democrat. The contract was awarded on June 19, 1860 to Ferdinand Wood for a cost of $1,165 and specified the use of the "Old Burr plan" in its design. On December 15, 1860, the Cecil Whig reported that construction of the new bridge at Hill's Fording was nearing completion.

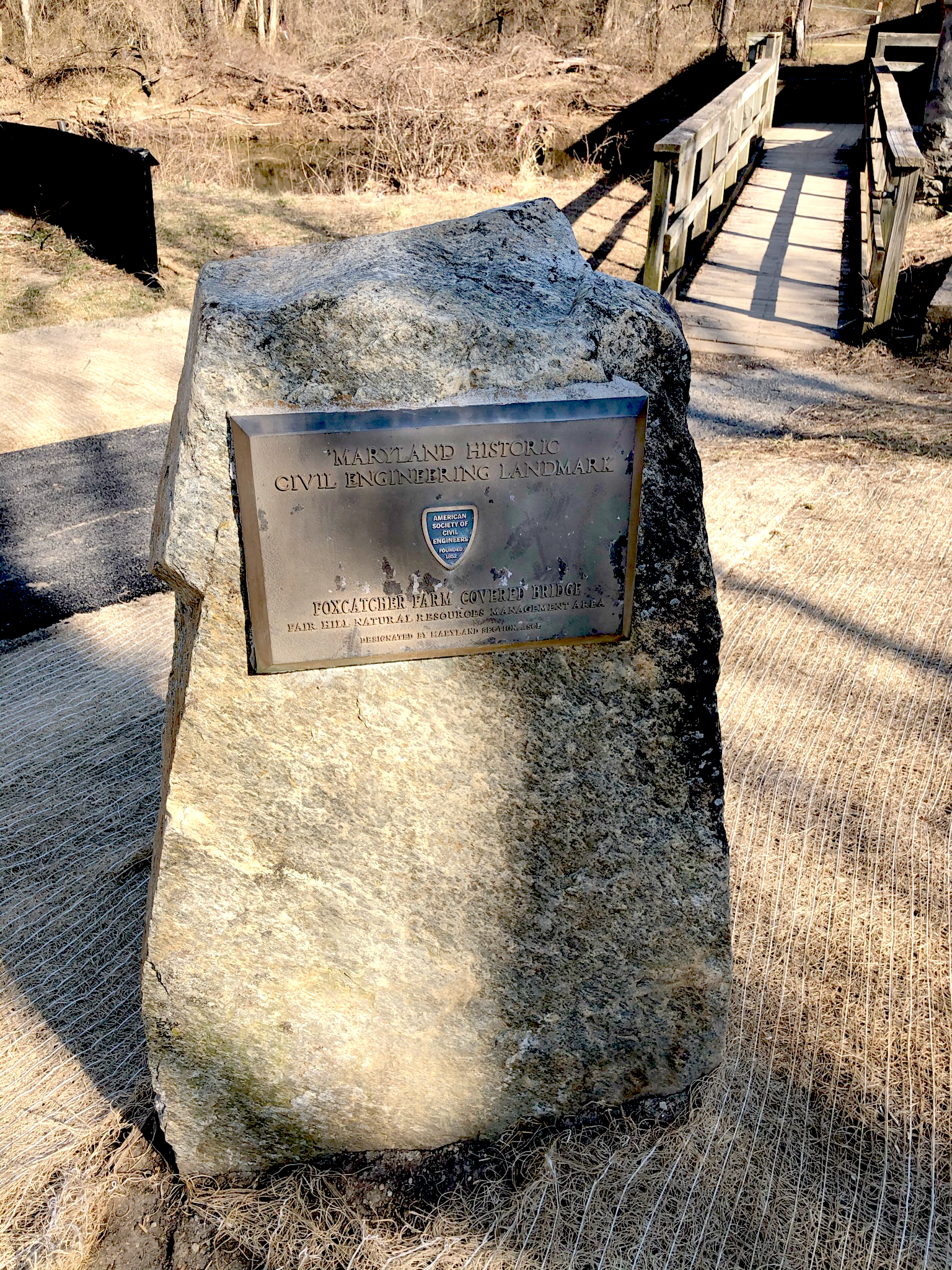
ASCE civil engineering landmark plaque at the bridge site, with the fishing pier in the background

An inventory of the bridge completed for the Maryland Historical Trust in the late 1970s described the covered bridge as being a smaller version of the Gilpin's Falls Covered Bridge, a covered bridge which is also located in Cecil County.

Foxcatcher Farm Covered Bridge was damaged by trucks in 1938 and 1950; it was repaired in both instances. The bridge was substantially reconstructed from March 1992 through September 1992. Engineers estimated that about 60 percent of the structural members were replaced during the process, but some of the King post splices and chord timbers in the Burr arch were saved and reused inside the bridge. The renovation was completed by Erik Straub for the Maryland Department of Natural Resources at a cost of $152,000.

The bridge was designated as a Maryland Historic Civil Engineering Landmark by the American Society of Civil Engineers in 1994. At the time of its designation as a civil engineering landmark, the Foxcatcher Farm Covered Bridge was the last remaining Burr arch truss bridge in Maryland carrying vehicular traffic.

The bridge was closed to general vehicular traffic by 1998. It is currently open to pedestrians, bicycles, and equestrians; use by motor vehicles is restricted to those associated with the Fair Hill Natural Resources Area.

A wooden fishing pier was added along the north side of the bridge in 1992 as part of the restoration project. The site of the covered bridge has been used by workers to stock Big Elk Creek with brown and rainbow trout.

== See also ==
- List of covered bridges in Maryland
