= Kingsville, Maryland =

- Census-designated place
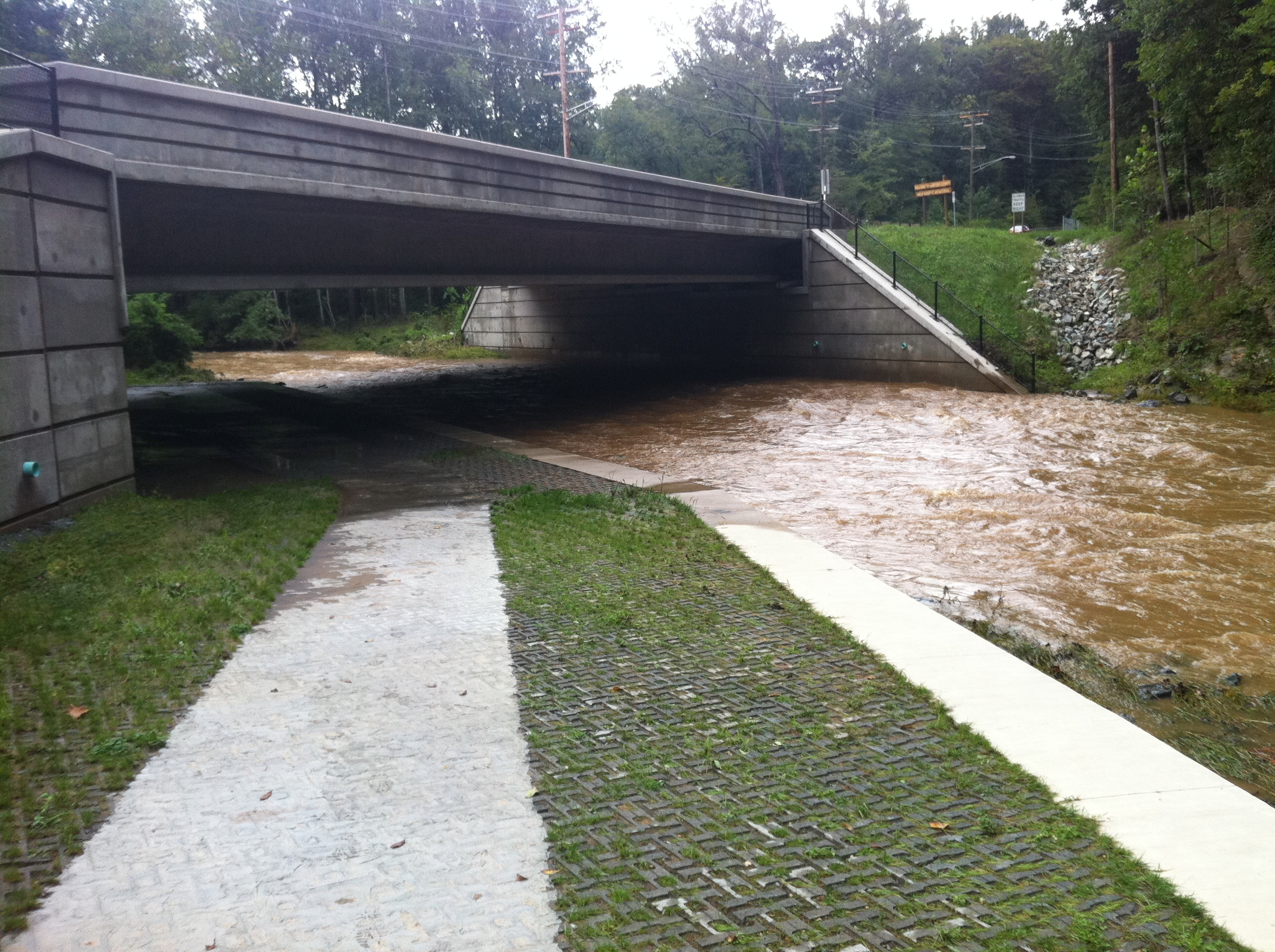
- Little Gunpowder Falls Bridge at Baltimore-Harford County Line in Kingsville, Maryland

- Location of Kingsville, Maryland
- Coordinates: 39°26′57″N 76°24′50″W
- Country: United States
- State: Maryland
- County: Baltimore

Area
  - Total: 10.10 sq mi (26.17 km^{2})
  - Land: 10.04 sq mi (26.00 km^{2})
  - Water: 0.066 sq mi (0.17 km^{2})
- Elevation: 272 ft (83 m)

Population (2020)
  - Total: 4,358
  - Density: 434.1/sq mi (167.62/km^{2})
- Time zone: UTC−5 (Eastern (EST))
  - Summer (DST): UTC−4 (EDT)
- ZIP code: 21087
- Area code: 410
- FIPS code: 24-44350
- GNIS feature ID: 0585320

Kingsville is a semi-rural, unincorporated community and census-designated place in Baltimore County, Maryland, United States. It is a close-knit and rustic community bounded by the Little Gunpowder Falls river (to the northeast) and the Big Gunpowder Falls river (to the southwest) which join to form the Gunpowder River. The population of Kingsville was 4,318 at the 2010 census.

== History ==
Kingsville takes its name from Abraham King (1760–1836), who died there on December 15 at the age of 76. King, a native of Willistown Township, Chester County, Pennsylvania, acquired some 290 acres (1.2 km^{2}) of land from Thomas Kell (a county judge) in and about the site of Kingsville from parts of the original grants of Leaf's Chance, William the Conqueror, Selby's Hope, John's Delight and Onion's Prospect Hill, according to a deed executed May 13, 1816. King lived in the old Hugh Deane-John Paul mansion (later known as the Kingsville Inn and presently as the Lassahn Funeral home on Belair Road) with his wife Elizabeth Taylor, a sister of the Hon. John Taylor of Willistown, who settled in the West and was the Chief Judge of the Superior Court of Mississippi for a number of years. An 1823 assessment of Old District 2 showed "Abraham King with 290 acres of 'William the Conqueror' and $350 worth of improvements, no slaves."

The King family operated a tavern according to an 1847 advertisement in American Farmer (a pioneer agricultural journal) at the forks of Bel Air and Joppa (presumably present day Jerusalem) roads. U.S. postal records indicate that a post office was established at King's Tavern on January 29, 1829, with a George King noted as the postmaster; the office was named "Kingsville" on January 8, 1830. In 1840, State Geologist John Henry Alexander was the first to put Kingsville on a map.

Kingsville is bordered by the restored Jerusalem Mill Village museum, Jericho Farm, and the renovated Jericho Covered Bridge on the banks of the Little Gunpowder Falls. They are listed on the National Register of Historic Places.

Other nearby communities include Upper Falls, Bradshaw, Franklinville, Joppa, Fork and Perry Hall.

== Geography ==
Kingsville is located at 39°26′57″N 76°24′50″W (39.449257, −76.413933).

According to the United States Census Bureau, the CDP has a total area of 10.1 square miles (26 km^{2}), all land.

== Demographics ==
Historical population
Census	Pop.	Note	%±
1980	2,824		—
1990	3,550		25.7%
2000	4,214		18.7%
2010	4,318		2.5%
2020	4,358		0.9%
U.S. Decennial Census

=== Racial and ethnic composition ===
Kingsville CDP, Maryland – Racial and ethnic composition Note: the US Census treats Hispanic/Latino as an ethnic category. This table excludes Latinos from the racial categories and assigns them to a separate category. Hispanics/Latinos may be of any race.
Race / Ethnicity (NH = Non-Hispanic)	Pop 2000	Pop 2010	Pop 2020	% 2000	% 2010	% 2020
White alone (NH)	4,087	4,112	3,957	96.99%	95.23%	90.80%
Black or African American alone (NH)	15	40	45	0.36%	0.93%	1.03%
Native American or Alaska Native alone (NH)	10	2	4	0.24%	0.05%	0.09%
Asian alone (NH)	40	55	58	0.95%	1.27%	1.33%
Native Hawaiian or Pacific Islander alone (NH)	0	0	11	0.00%	0.00%	0.25%
Other race alone (NH)	1	5	11	0.02%	0.12%	0.25%
Mixed race or Multiracial (NH)	25	37	122	0.59%	0.86%	2.80%
Hispanic or Latino (any race)	36	67	150	0.85%	1.55%	3.44%
Total	4,214	4,318	4,358	100.00%	100.00%	100.00%

=== 2020 census ===
As of the 2020 census, Kingsville had a population of 4,358. The median age was 51.5 years. 17.6% of residents were under the age of 18 and 24.1% of residents were 65 years of age or older. For every 100 females there were 101.8 males, and for every 100 females age 18 and over there were 102.7 males age 18 and over.

28.7% of residents lived in urban areas, while 71.3% lived in rural areas.

There were 1,622 households in Kingsville, of which 26.8% had children under the age of 18 living in them. Of all households, 69.9% were married-couple households, 12.8% were households with a male householder and no spouse or partner present, and 13.6% were households with a female householder and no spouse or partner present. About 16.3% of all households were made up of individuals and 8.7% had someone living alone who was 65 years of age or older.

There were 1,701 housing units, of which 4.6% were vacant. The homeowner vacancy rate was 0.7% and the rental vacancy rate was 0.0%.

=== 2000 census ===
As of the census of 2000, there were 4,214 people, 1,483 households, and 1,224 families residing in the CDP. The population density was 417.3 inhabitants per square mile (161.1/km^{2}). There were 1,522 housing units at an average density of 150.7 per square mile (58.2/km^{2}). The racial makeup of the CDP was 97.41% White, 0.36% African American, 0.31% Native American, 0.97% Asian, 0.24% from other races, and 0.71% from two or more races. Hispanic or Latino of any race were 0.85% of the population.

There were 1,483 households, out of which 35.5% had children under the age of 18 living with them, 73.6% were married couples living together, 6.1% had a female householder with no husband present, and 17.4% were non-families. 13.9% of all households were made up of individuals, and 7.3% had someone living alone who was 65 years of age or older. The average household size was 2.84 and the average family size was 3.14.

In the CDP, the population was spread out, with 24.4% under the age of 18, 6.1% from 18 to 24, 24.8% from 25 to 44, 29.8% from 45 to 64, and 14.9% who were 65 years of age or older. The median age was 42 years. For every 100 females, there were 97.1 males. For every 100 females age 18 and over, there were 95.0 males.

The median income for a household in the CDP was $78,025, and the median income for a family was $87,071. Males had a median income of $52,140 versus $31,438 for females. The per capita income for the CDP was $34,579. About 2.6% of families and 2.6% of the population were below the poverty line, including 0.5% of those under age 18 and 7.4% of those age 65 or over.

== Notable people ==
- Charles Joseph Bonaparte (1851–1921), U.S. Secretary of the Navy and Attorney General
- Ishmael Day, early resident
- Dave Johnson, former MLB pitcher
- Tom Phoebus, former MLB pitcher
- Blaze Starr, former burlesque star
- William Purington Cole Jr. - US Congressman 1927–29, 31–38; President Board of Trustees of University of Maryland; resided at Beachmont Farm, then known as Clearview Farm.
