= Jericho Farm (Kingsville, Maryland) =

Historic house in Maryland, United States

- U.S. National Register of Historic Places
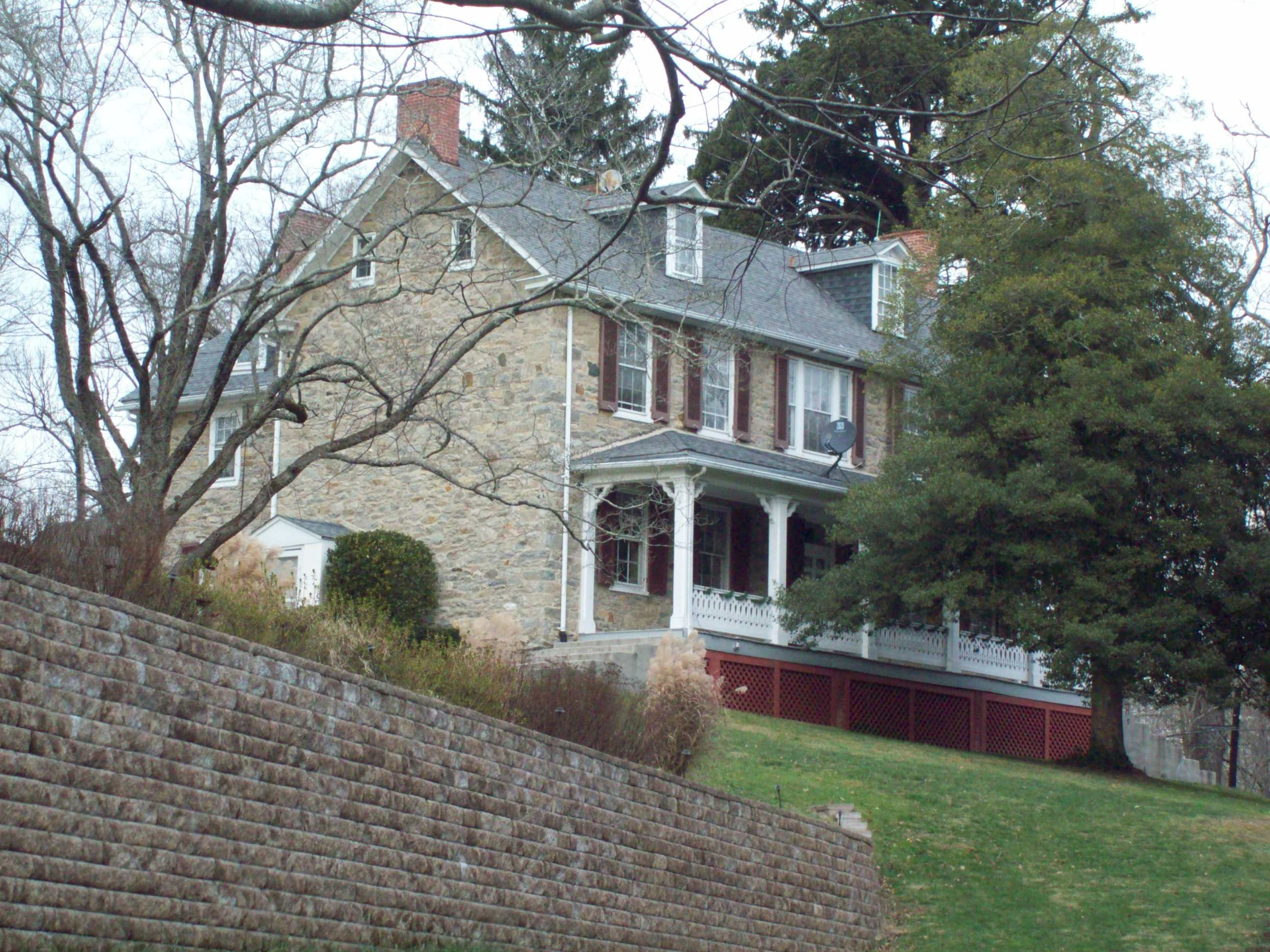
- Jericho Farm, December 2009

- Location within Maryland Location within the United States
- Location: 12230 Jericho Road, Kingsville, Maryland, U.S.
- Coordinates: 39°27′23″N 76°23′17″W
- Area: 1.2 acres (0.49 ha)
- Built: 1780
- NRHP reference No.: 84001352
- Added to NRHP: September 7, 1984

Jericho Farm is a historic home located near Kingsville, Baltimore County, Maryland, near historic Jerusalem Mill Village. It is a large 2 1/2-story gable-roofed stone 25 by 30-foot dwelling house.

The house was constructed in two periods: the original dwelling, built circa 1771 consisting of a 2+1/2-story, side-passage, double pile house; additions were made in 1780; about 1820, a five-bay, 2+1/2-story, center-passage, single pile house was constructed against the south gable of the earlier building.

Jericho Farm was listed on the National Register of Historic Places in 1984.
