= Ishmael Day =

Ishmael Day (March 20, 1792 – December 27, 1873) was a supporter of the Union during the American Civil War who made a famous stand against Confederate raiders attempting to remove the Union flag outside his property. Day is remembered in poems and ballads of the Civil War era.

== Biography ==
Born on March 20, 1792, in Baltimore County and christened June 16, 1793, at Saint James Protestant Episcopal Parish, Baltimore, Maryland. Ishmael Day was the son of Edward and Mary Day in the 11th District of Baltimore County in Maryland. His birthplace was off of the current Mount Vista Road. He was married to Charity Johnson on March 21, 1822, at the St Johns Parish Protestant Episcopal, in Kingsville, Maryland, in Baltimore County, Maryland, which still stands and is in use as of 2016. Charity Johnson Day died in 1846 and he married again to Ann E. Day, who died in 1868 at 63 years of age. Ishmael Day died December 27, 1873. Buried in the same vicinity of Day and his two wives is a Jenny Day who died October 1, 1836, aged 1 year and 10 months, which would have been the daughter of Charity Johnson Day. This family is buried at Fork United Methodist Church's cemetery.

Day freed his slave woman, Eliza, in 1846, declaring in the manumission document that he lived "under a Republican Government & believing as I most sincerely do that all the Human Race without respect to sex or Coulour (sic) should & ought to be free."

Little is known of his life, except that during the American Civil War he was sympathetic to the Union Army in a neighborhood that had sympathy for the Confederate Army. His home on Sunshine Avenue in Fork, Maryland near Mount Vista Estates and the intersection of Harford Road was the site of an incident on July 11, 1864. When the advance guard for Harry Gilmor's raiders was in the area, Ishmael Day placed a large Union flag over his gate. Gilmor's Ordnance Sergeant Eugene Fields told Day to take the flag down. After Day refused, an argument followed and Ishmael Day shot Sgt. Field at close range with a shotgun. Gilmor's men burned Day's home and Day immediately fled- hiding under a cider press for days until the passing troops were gone. The mortally wounded Sgt. Field was taken to Wright's Hotel operated by W.O.B. Wright on Harford Road accompanied by Gilmor where Field later died.

After this incident, Day fled into the nearby fields and hid under a cider press for several days until he could escape into the city of Baltimore. After a time, he returned and rebuilt his home. Ishmael Day is buried in the cemetery of Fork United Methodist Church in Fork, Maryland.

== Legacy ==
The State Convention of Maryland, formed to construct a new constitution, formally ordered that Day be thanked for his actions.

Day is remembered in the poem The Patriot Ishmael Day by William H. Hayward and the anonymous Ballad of Ishmael Day. There is also a modern fictional account of his life by William R. Bell.

Maryland Marker commemorating the event

Ishmael Day's marker
