= Utica Covered Bridge =

- U.S. National Register of Historic Places
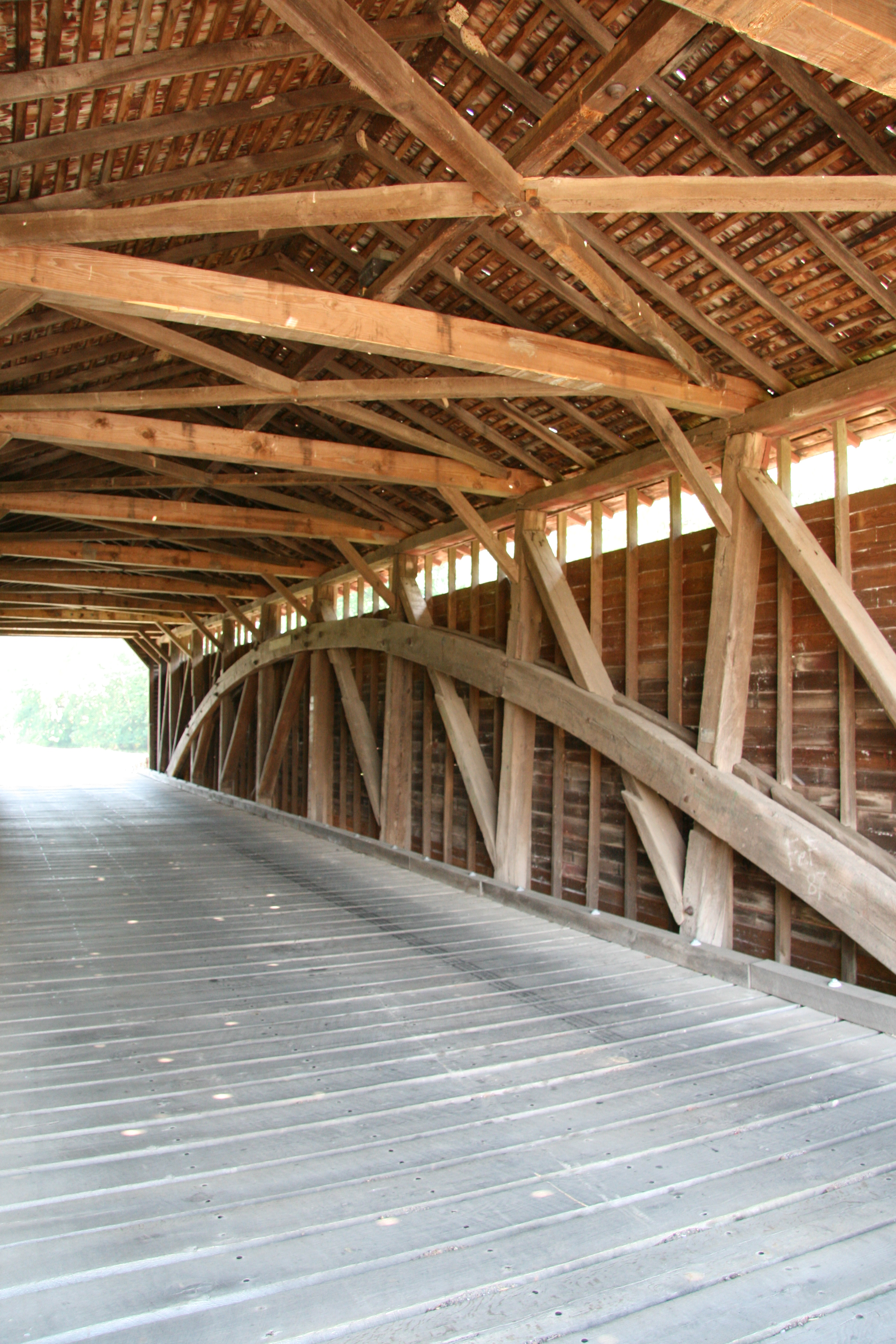

- Location within Maryland Location within the United States
- Location: Utica Rd. at Fishing Creek, Thurmont, Maryland
- Coordinates: 39°31′28″N 77°23′46″W
- Area: 0.2 acres (0.081 ha)
- Built: 1860
- Architectural style: Burr arch truss
- MPS: Covered Bridges in Frederick County TR
- NRHP reference No.: 78003174
- Added to NRHP: June 23, 1978

The Utica Road Covered Bridge is a Burr truss wooden covered bridge located near Lewistown, Maryland. Originally built in 1834, it spanned the Monocacy River at the Devilbiss Bridge crossing. An 1889 flood damaged the bridge and the surviving half was moved to Fishing Creek in 1891. Like the nearby Loys Station Covered Bridge, a pier was inserted at the middle of the bridge to halve its span.

The Utica Covered Bridge was listed on the National Register of Historic Places in 1978.

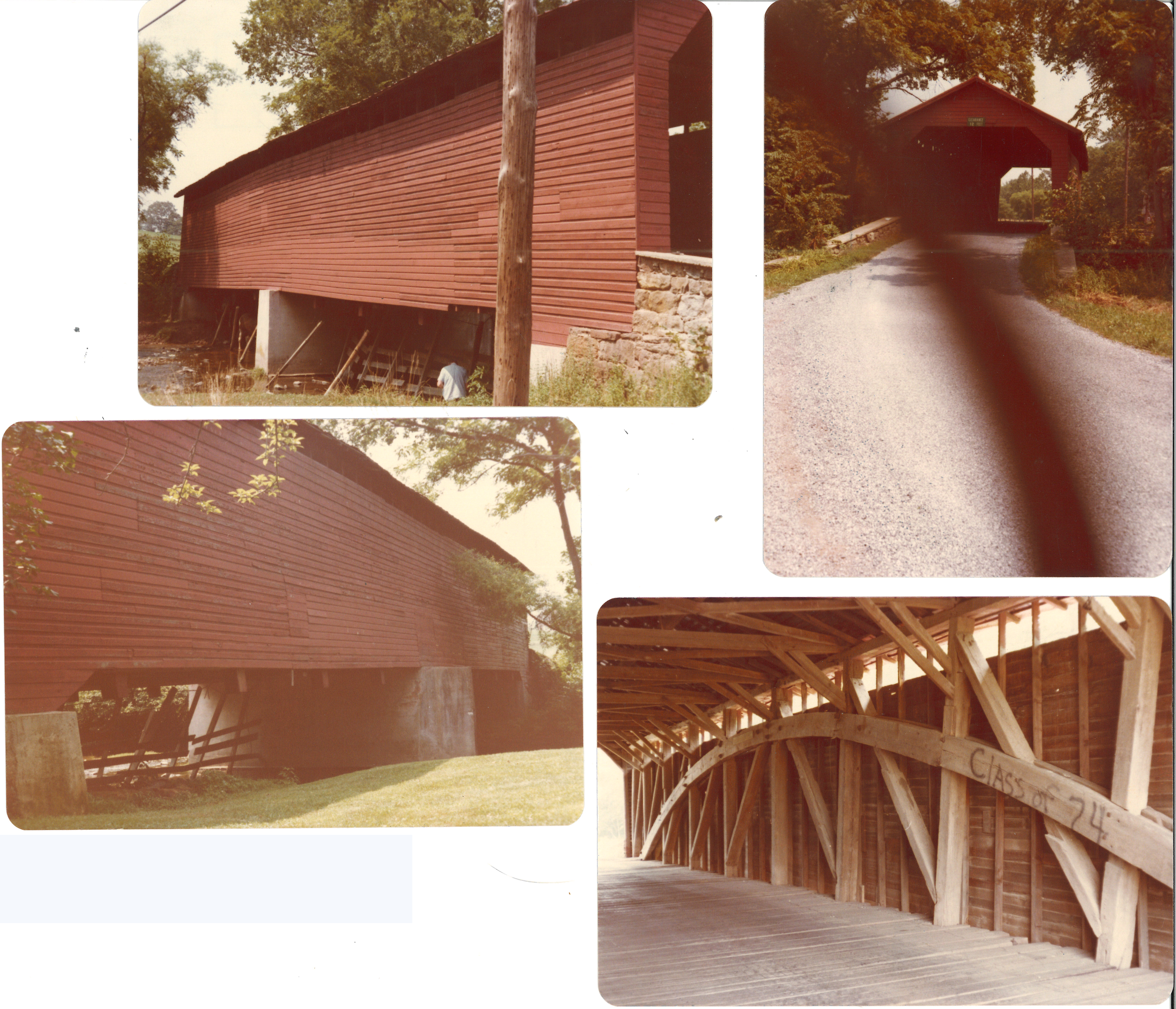
Utica Covered Bridge 1980s Condition
