= Jerusalem, Maryland =

Unincorporated community in Maryland, United States

Jerusalem
- Unincorporated community
- Location within the state of Maryland Jerusalem (the United States)
- Coordinates: 39°27′46″N 76°23′21″W
- Country: United States
- State: Maryland
- County: Harford
- Time zone: UTC-5 (Eastern (EST))
  - Summer (DST): UTC-4 (EDT)
- GNIS feature ID: 590559

Jerusalem is an unincorporated community in Harford County, Maryland, United States. It is the location of the historic Jerusalem Mill Village and Jericho Covered Bridge, both listed on the National Register of Historic Places. Jerusalem Mill Village is located on Jerusalem Road in Kingsville, MD between the Little Gunpowder Falls river and Jericho Road.
