= Jerusalem Mill Village =

Historic district in Maryland, United States

- U.S. National Register of Historic Places
- U.S. Historic district
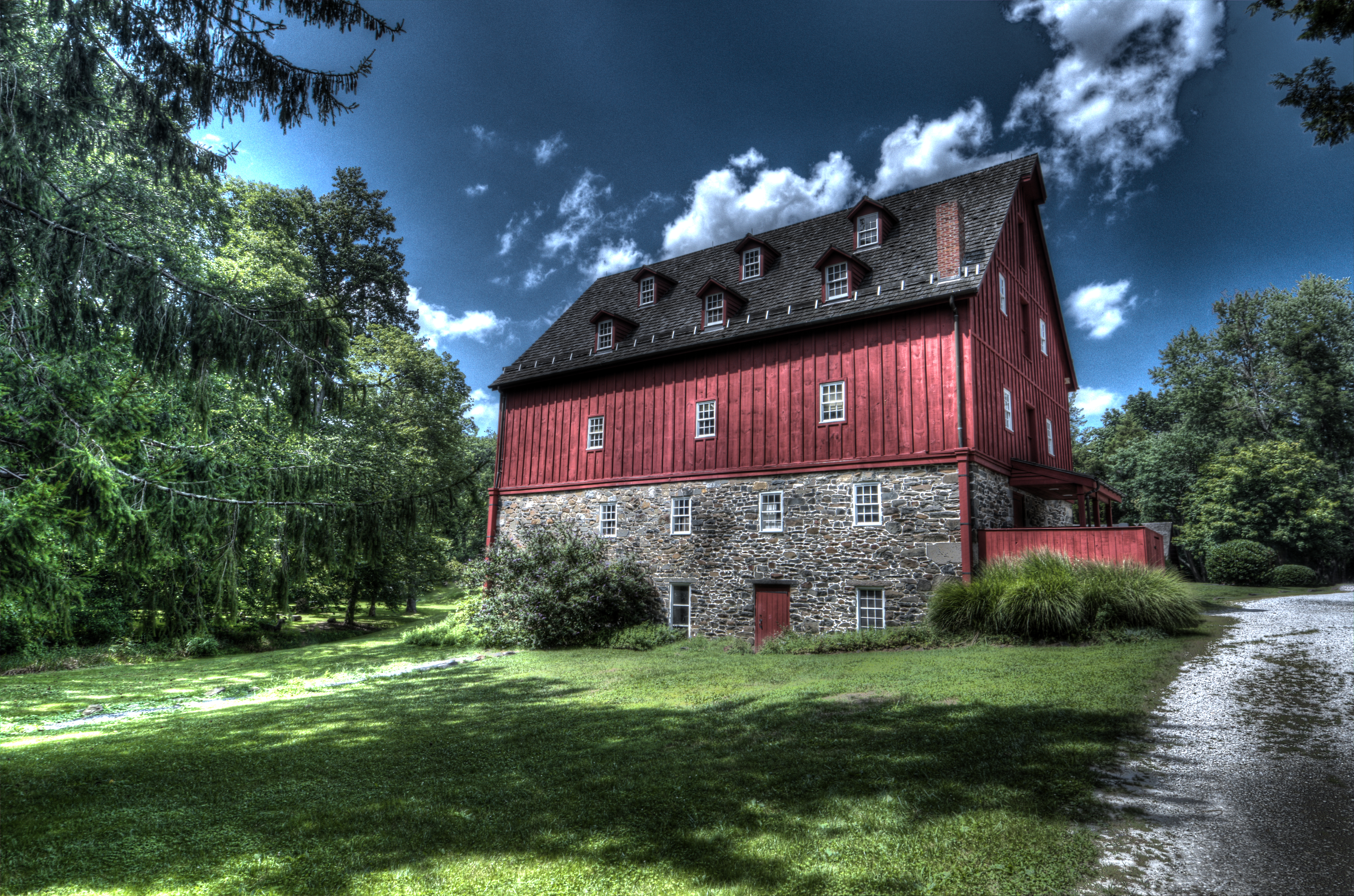
- Jerusalem Mill at Jerusalem Mill Village, August 2012

- Location within Maryland Location within the United States
- Location: Jerusalem and Jericho Rds. Jerusalem, Maryland, U.S.
- Coordinates: 39°27′41″N 76°23′23″W
- Area: 27 acres (11 ha)
- Built: 1772
- Architect: Lee, David; Et al.
- NRHP reference No.: 87001400
- Added to NRHP: August 20, 1987

Jerusalem Mill Village is a living history museum that spans the 18th through early 20th centuries. One of the oldest and most intact mill villages in the U.S. state of Maryland, Jerusalem is located in Harford County, along the Little Gunpowder Falls River. It also serves as the headquarters of the Gunpowder Falls State Park. The site was added to the National Register of Historic Places on August 20, 1987. Also on the National Register of Historic Places and located nearby are Jericho Farm and the Jericho Covered Bridge.

== History ==
The 318-acre (129 ha) tract of land called Jerusalem was patented to Nicholas Hampstead and John Walley in 1687. By 1743, the tract had been acquired by an ironmaster, Stephen Onion, and had been enlarged to 368 acres (149 ha) with several buildings. When Onion died in 1750, his nephew, Zacheas Barrett Onion, acquired the property. Onion engaged Isaiah Linton of Bucks County, Pennsylvania to come to Jerusalem to construct a merchant grist mill and to improve a nearby ironworks and several other mills. Linton was joined by his family and partner David Lee. He eventually built eight water-powered mills along the Little Gunpowder. The fourth mill, Jerusalem Mill, was completed in 1772 and is now the centerpiece of the living history village.

The village functioned as a Quaker village into the early 20th century. Evidence suggests that David Lee and several of his Quaker neighbors carved black walnut stocks and assembled rifles for the Continental army in the gunshop that stands behind the gristmill. During the Civil War, on July 11, 1864, Confederate Army Major Harry Gilmor sent a cavalry unit to the general store in Jerusalem Mills, now popularly known as McCourtney's Store, capturing supplies and horses, as part of Gilmor's Raid.

After the Civil War, the buildings in the village were gradually leased out and sold. A succession of owners operated the gristmill until 1961, when it was then purchased by the State of Maryland to be part of the Gunpowder Falls State Park.

The historic buildings are being restored and preserved by Friends of Jerusalem Mill, an all-volunteer, non-profit, public charity, which has leased the village from the state of Maryland since 1986. Its current lease is valid through 2039. Restoration, preservation and maintenance efforts are funded almost entirely by donations, sponsorships, memberships, events and countless volunteer hours. Events include a living history program, concerts by the falls, jousting tournaments, vintage baseball, First Responders' Day, and a lot more. Efforts are currently underway to stabilize and preserve the Lee Family's historic Bank Barn, mansion and two-story springhouse-smokehouse.

On April 10, 2016, a Blue Star Memorial Highway marker was dedicated at Jerusalem Mill, honoring those who served in the U.S. armed forces.

== Gallery ==
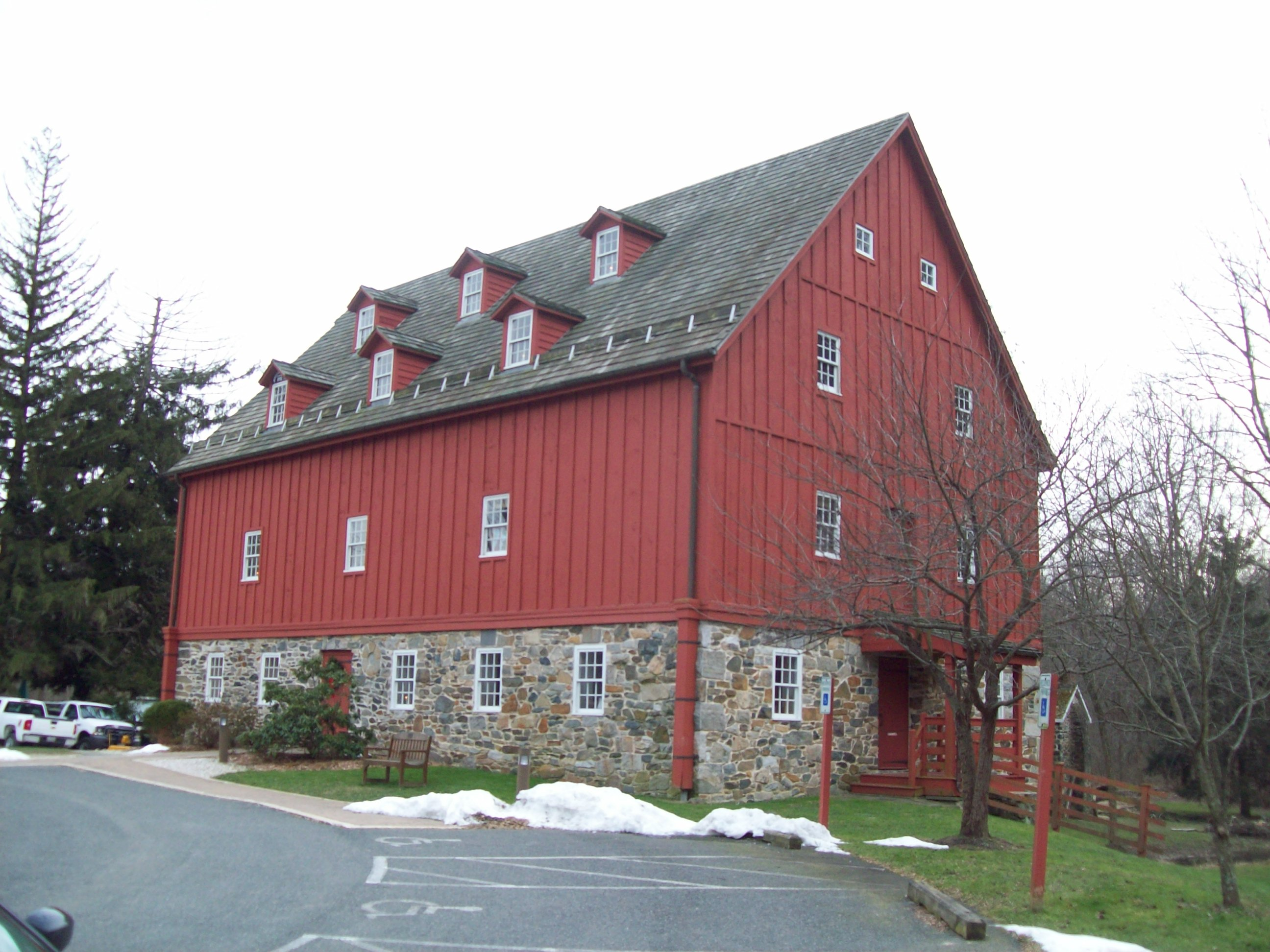
Jerusalem Mill at Jerusalem Mill Village, December 2009

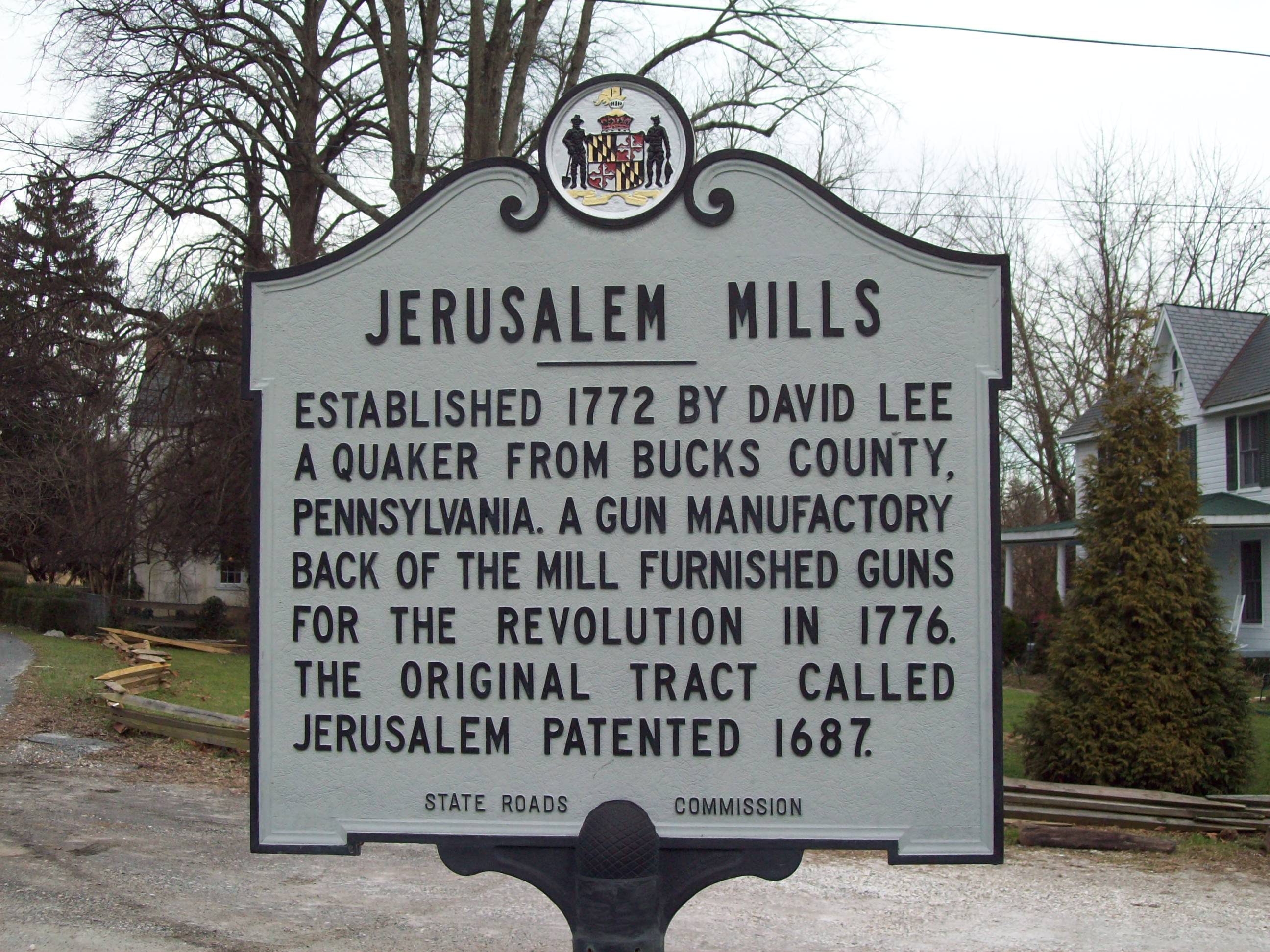
Jerusalem Mill Village Marker, December 2009

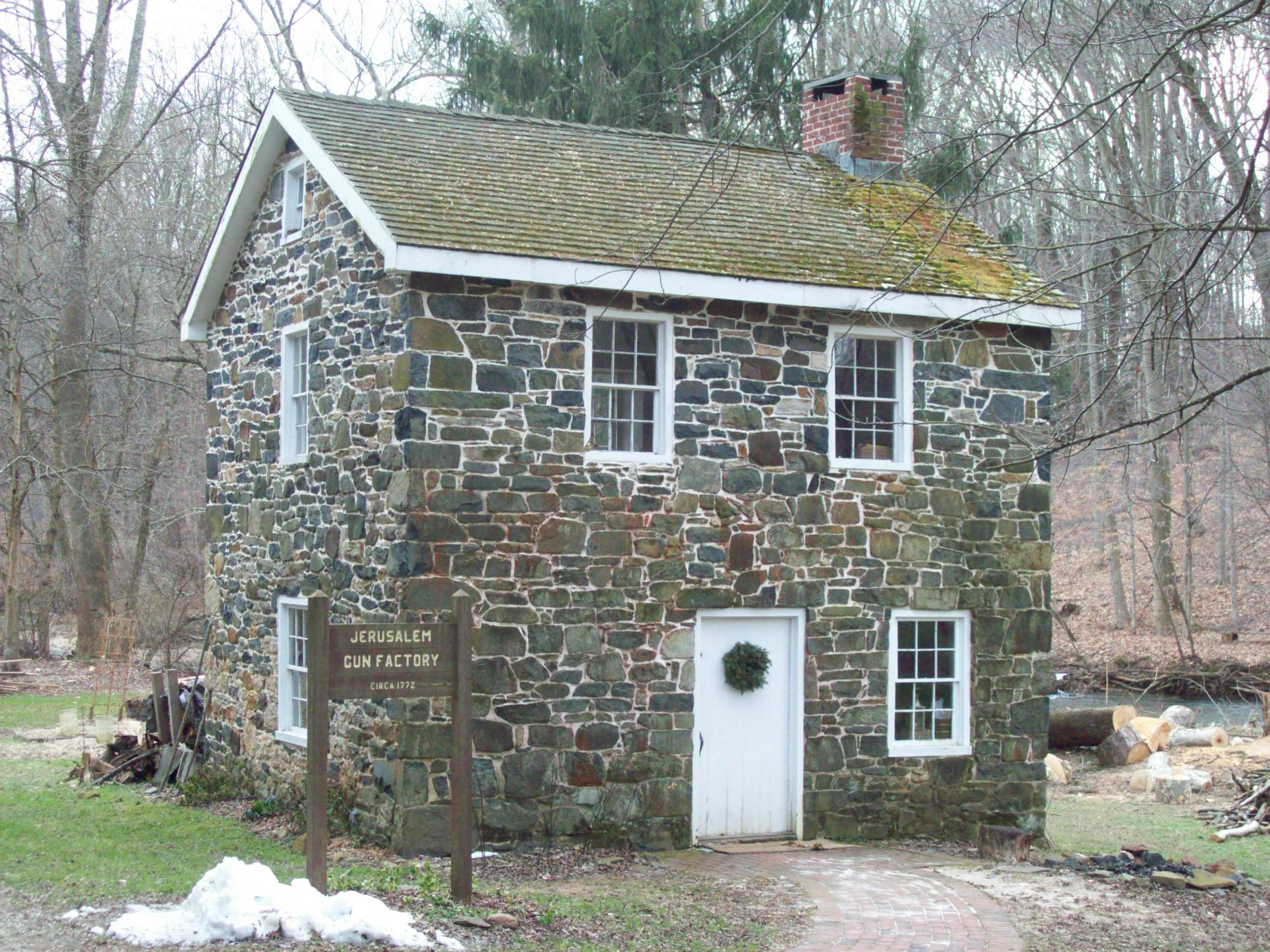
Jerusalem Mill Village-Gun/Cooper Shop, December 2009

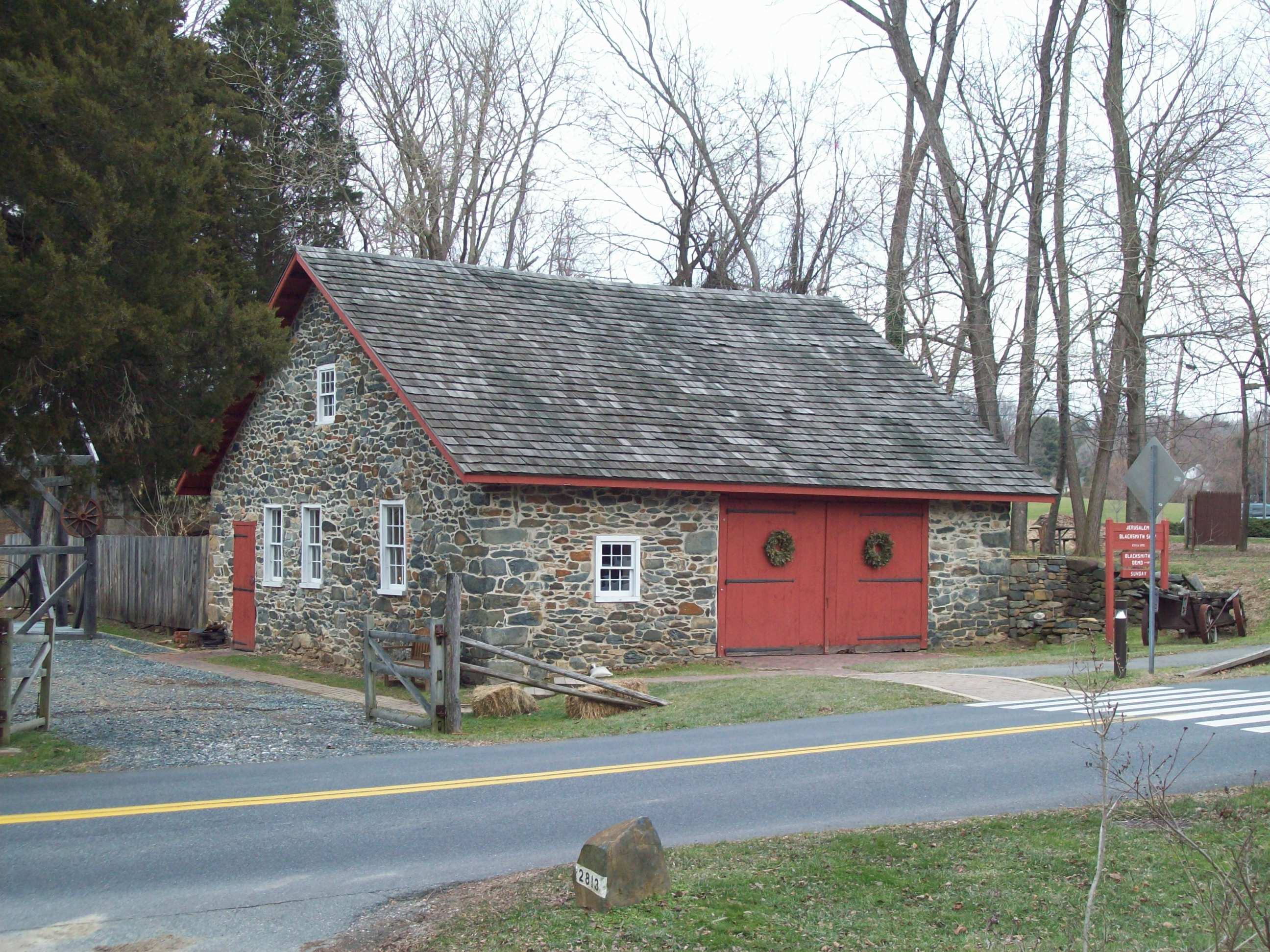
Jerusalem Mill Village-Blacksmith Shop, December 2009

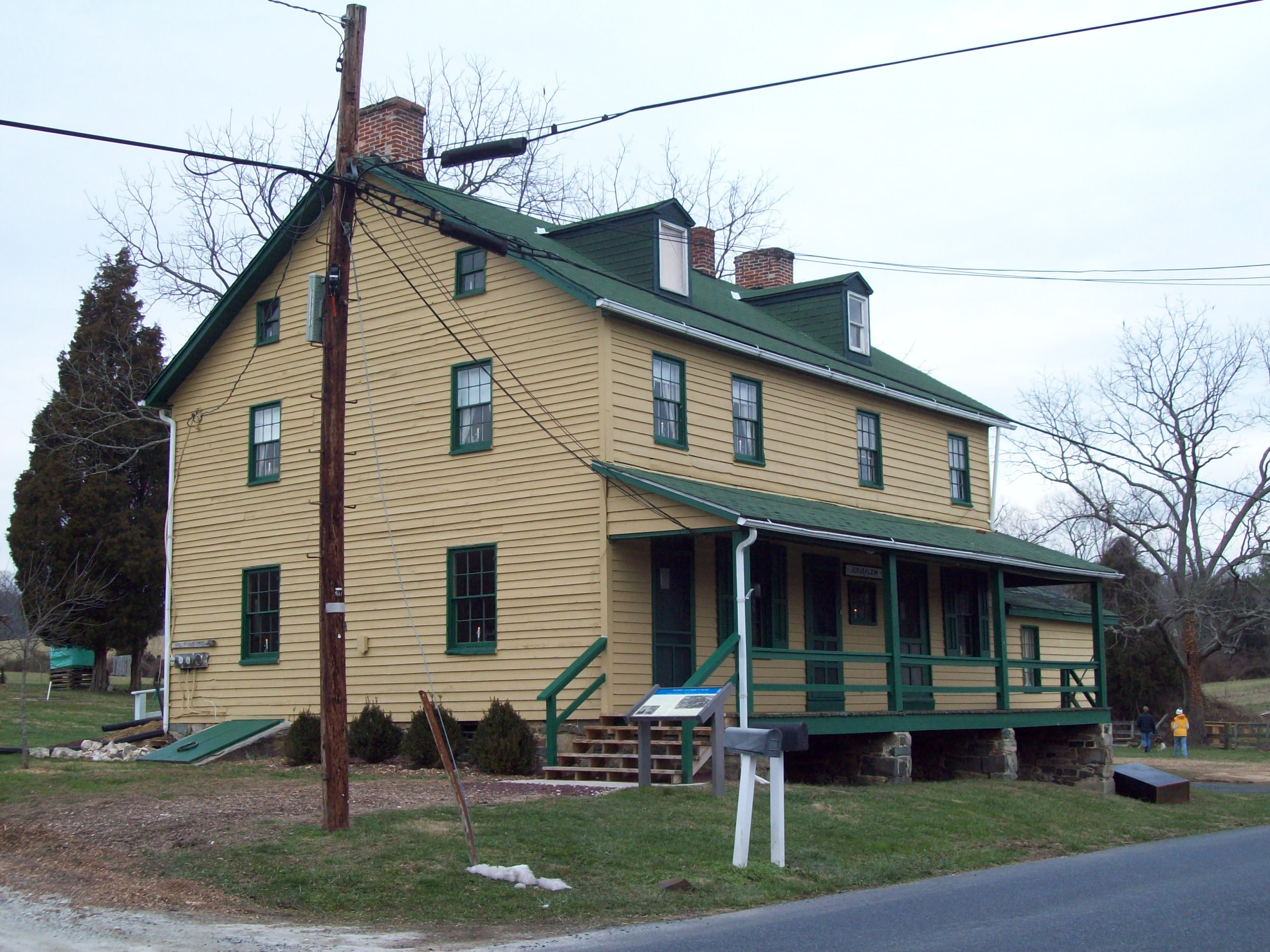
Jerusalem Mill Village-McCourtney's Store, December 2009

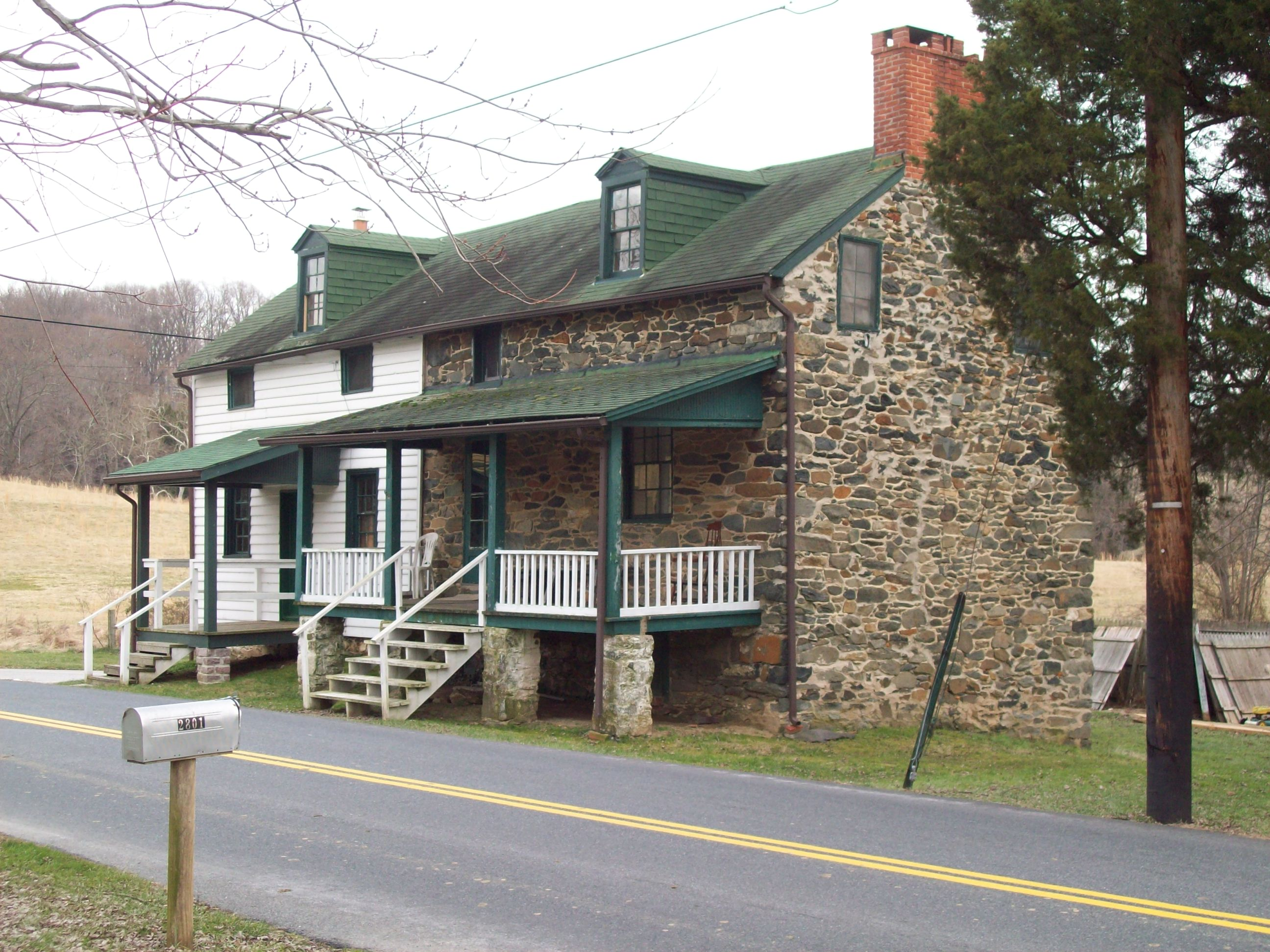
Jerusalem Mill Village-Tenant Farmhouse, December 2009

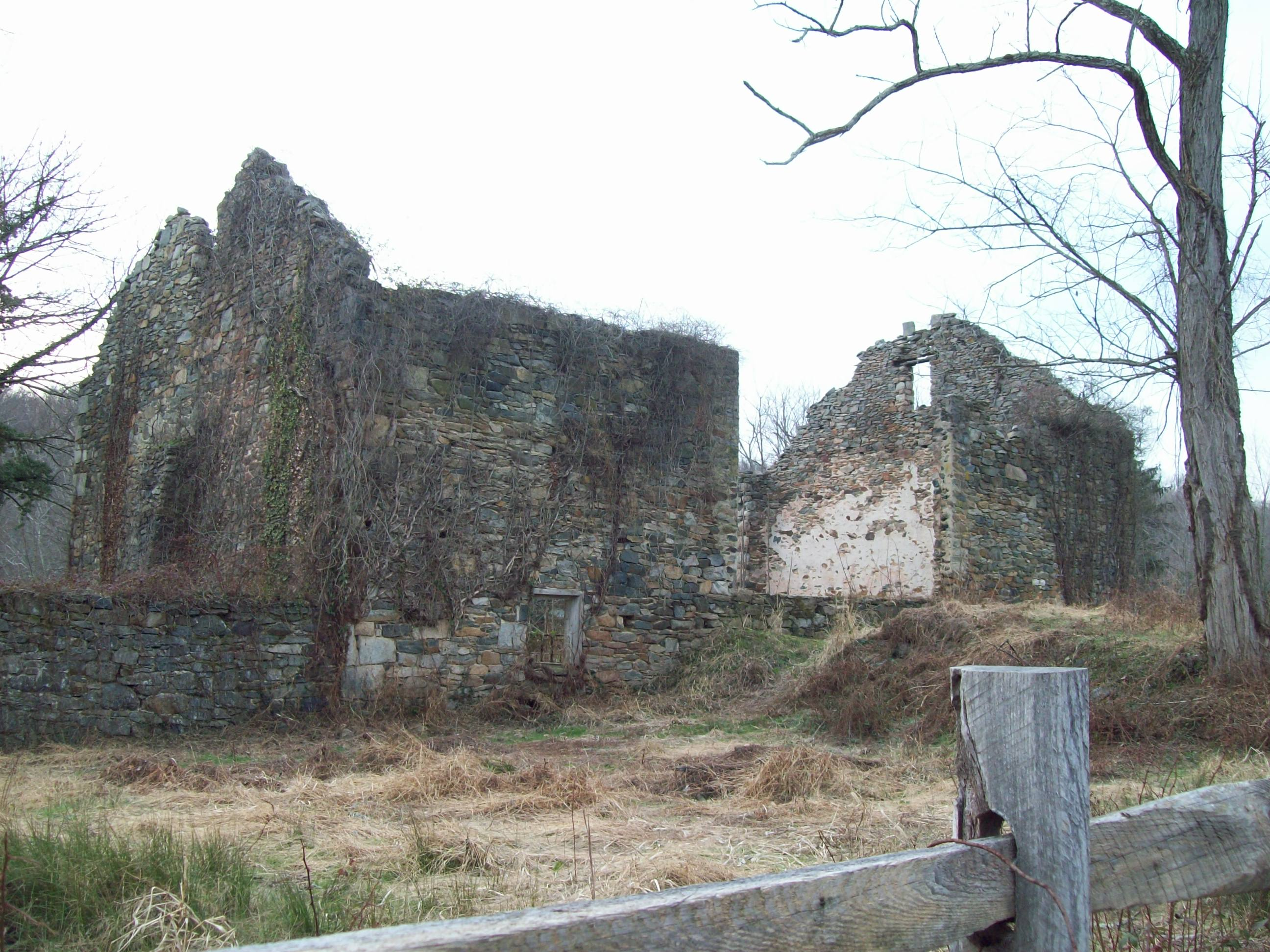
Jerusalem Mill Village-Bank Barn Ruins, December 2009

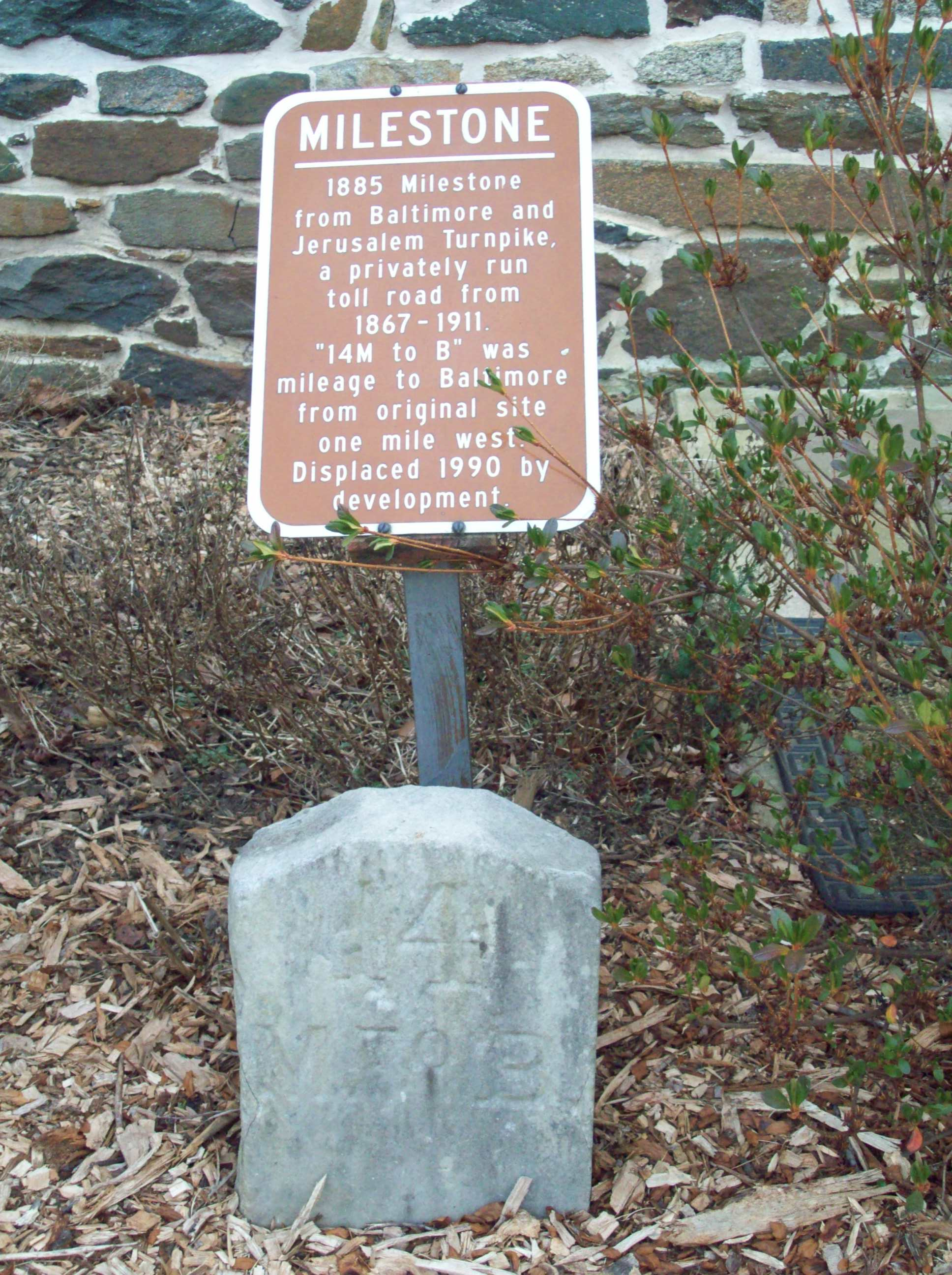
Jerusalem Mill Village-Milestone, December 2009

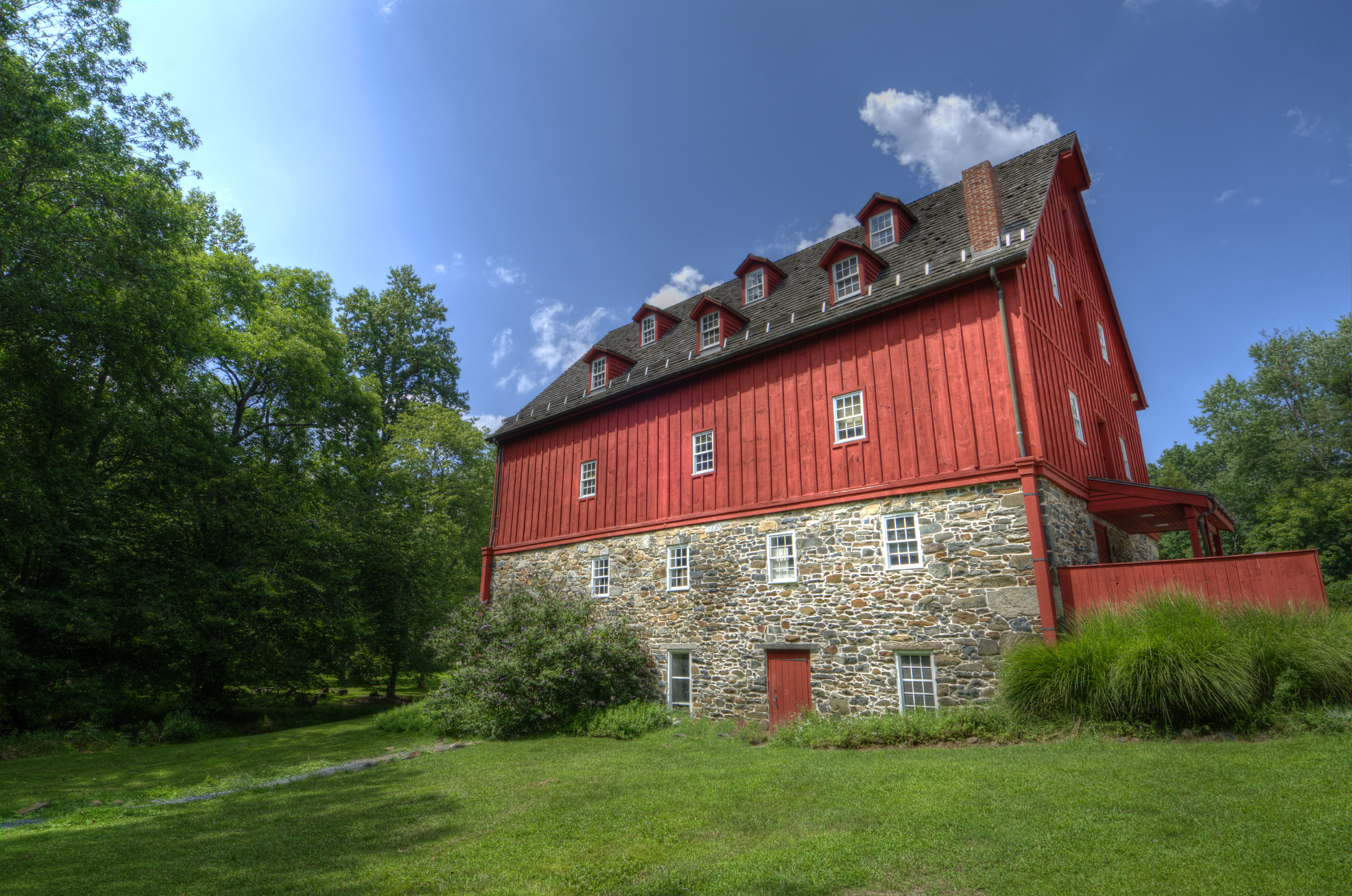
Jerusalem Mill at Jerusalem Mill Village, August 2012
