= Jericho Covered Bridge =

- U.S. National Register of Historic Places
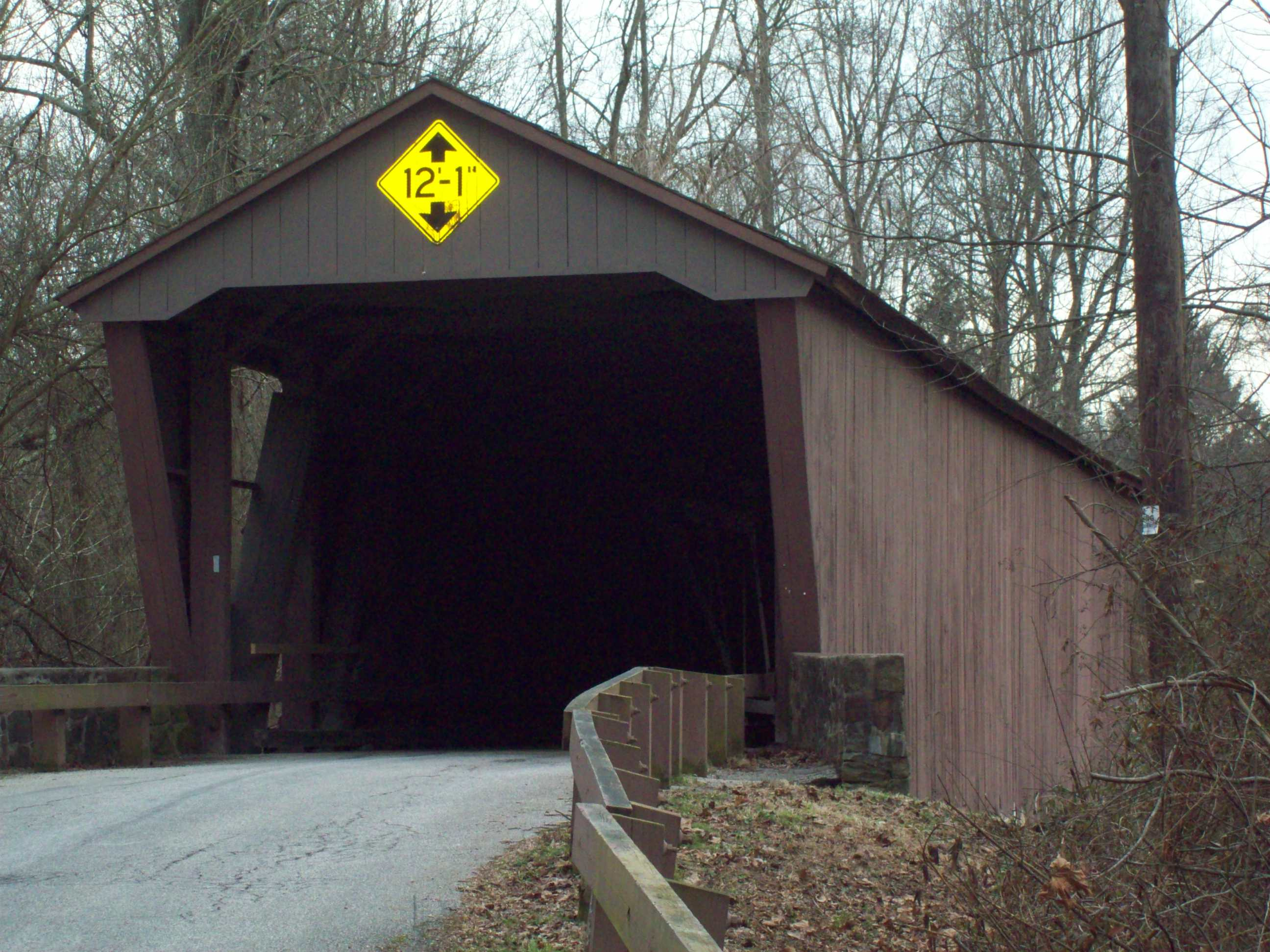
- Jericho Covered Bridge, December 2009

- Location within Maryland Location within the United States
- Location: Jericho Road over Little Gunpowder Falls, Jerusalem and Kingsville, Maryland
- Coordinates: 39°27′34″N 76°23′16″W
- Area: less than one acre
- Built: 1865
- Architect: Forsyth, Thomas F.
- Architectural style: Burr Arch Through Truss
- NRHP reference No.: 78001444
- Added to NRHP: September 13, 1978

The Jericho Covered Bridge is a Burr arch through truss wooden covered bridge near Jerusalem, Harford County and Kingsville, Baltimore County, in Maryland, United States and near historic Jerusalem Mill Village. The bridge was constructed in 1865 across the Little Gunpowder Falls. This bridge is 88 feet (27 m) long and 14.7 feet (4.5 m) wide and is open to traffic.

The Jericho Covered Bridge was listed on the National Register of Historic Places in 1978.

== Renovations ==
Renovations were made to the original bridge in 1937 and 1982. The bridge also underwent renovations during the summer of 2015.

== See also ==
- List of bridges documented by the Historic American Engineering Record in Maryland
- List of bridges on the National Register of Historic Places in Maryland
