= Upper Falls, Maryland =

Unincorporated community in Maryland, United States

- Unincorporated community
- Location within the State of Maryland Upper Falls, Maryland (the United States)
- Coordinates: 39°26′14″N 76°24′12″W
- Country: United States
- State: Maryland
- County: Baltimore
- Time zone: UTC-5 (Eastern (EST))
  - Summer (DST): UTC-4 (EDT)
- ZIP codes: 21156
- GNIS feature ID: 587979

Upper Falls is an unincorporated community in Baltimore County, Maryland, United States. southeast of Kingsville. Upper Falls has a post office with ZIP code 21156.
