= Loys Station Covered Bridge =

- U.S. National Register of Historic Places
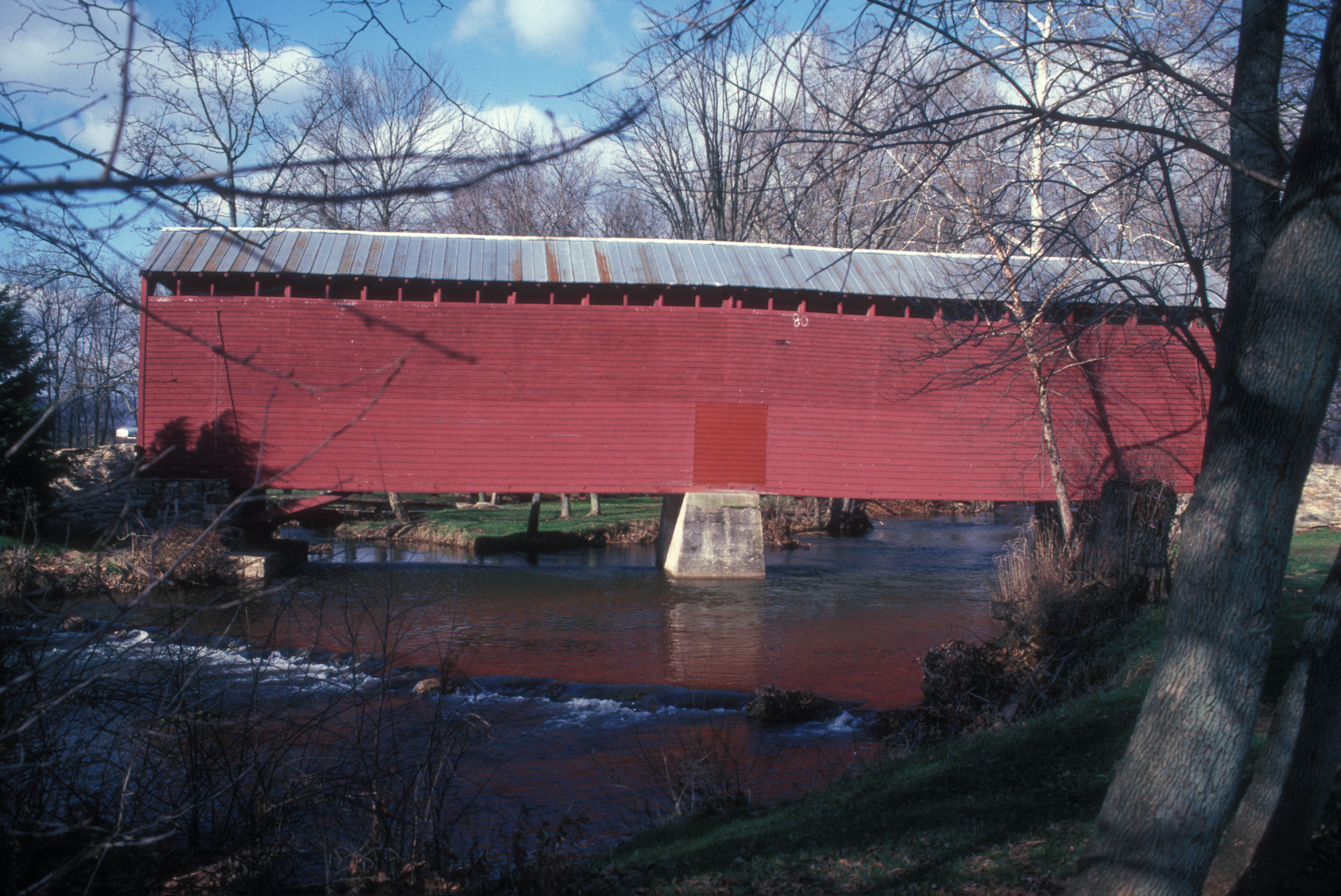
- The original bridge in 1985

- Location within Maryland Location within the United States
- Nearest city: Thurmont, Maryland
- Coordinates: 39°36′31″N 77°21′5″W
- Area: 0.2 acres (0.081 ha)
- Built: 1860
- Architectural style: Multiple king post
- MPS: Covered Bridges in Frederick County TR
- NRHP reference No.: 78003175
- Added to NRHP: June 23, 1978

The Loys Station Covered Bridge is a multiple king post wooden covered bridge near Thurmont, Maryland. The bridge was burned by an arsonist in 1991 and rebuilt using surviving framing. The original bridge spanned 90 feet in one span, but has since been modified with a pier at the middle of the span. The bridge crosses Owen's Creek and is surrounded by a park.

== History ==
Loys Station Covered Bridge was originally built in 1848. Between 1929 and 1930 the bridge was reinforced with a concrete pier and steel beams. The bridge gets its name from a Western Maryland Railroad station that stopped nearby the bridge in Loys. In 1978 the bridge was added to the National Register of Historic Places. In 1991 the bridge was burned down by an arsonist who was trying to fraudulently collect insurance money. The bridge took three years and $300,000 to rebuild and was rebuilt to match the bridge as it was in 1930 after having been reinforced. Most of the cost of reconstructing the bridge was covered by insurance. On 4 July 1994 the bridge officially reopened for the public. In October 2013 the bridge was damaged twice by vehicles, but quickly repaired both times.

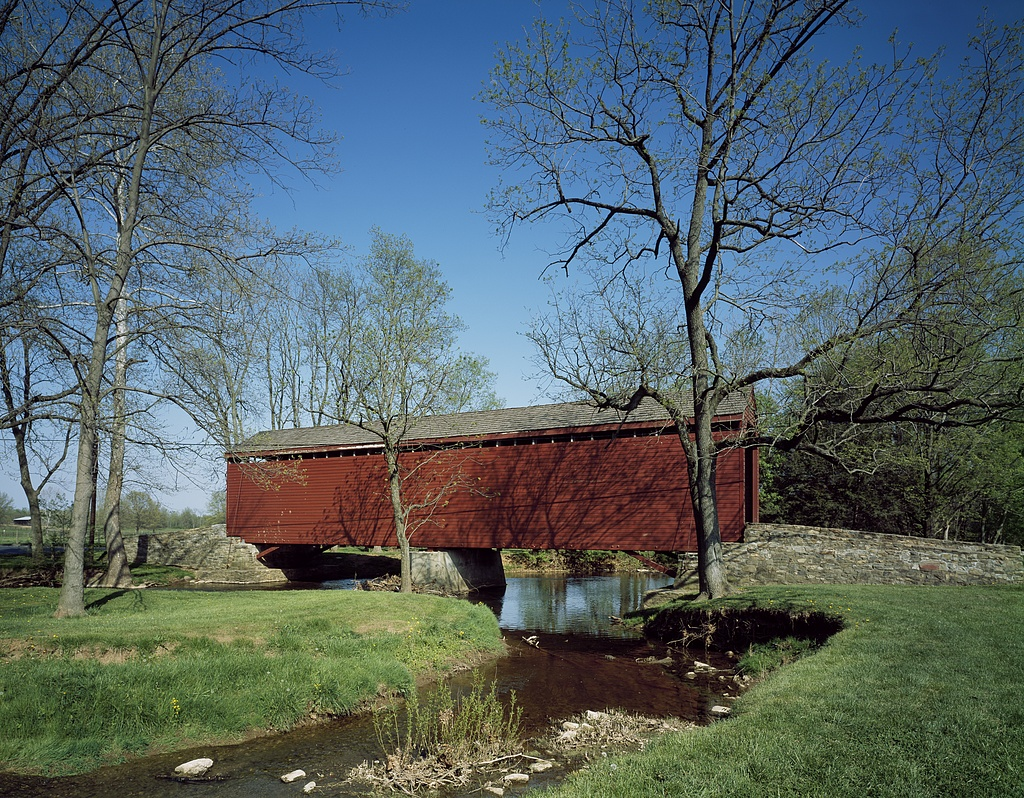
As photographed by Carol M. Highsmith

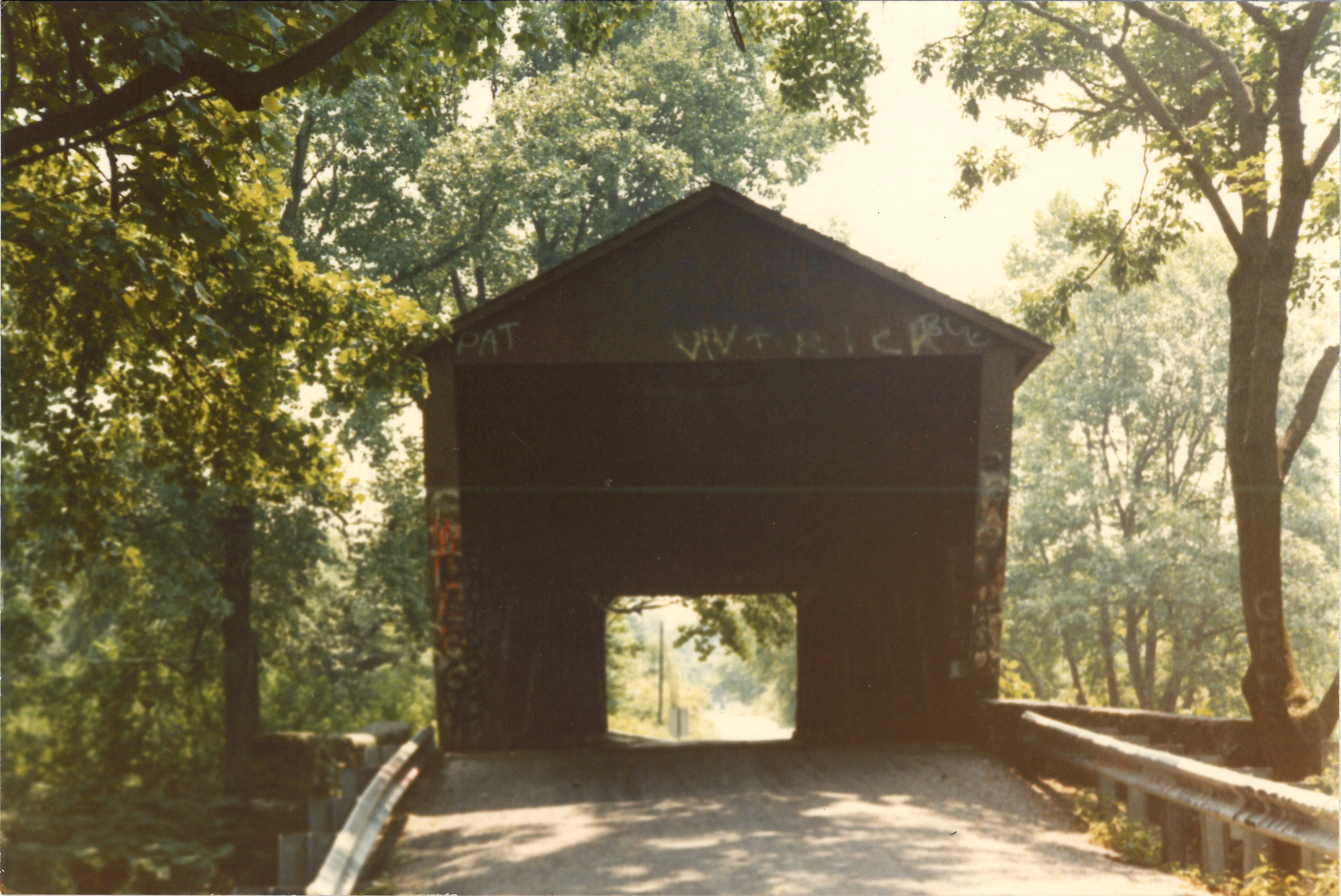
Loy's Station Approach from 1980s

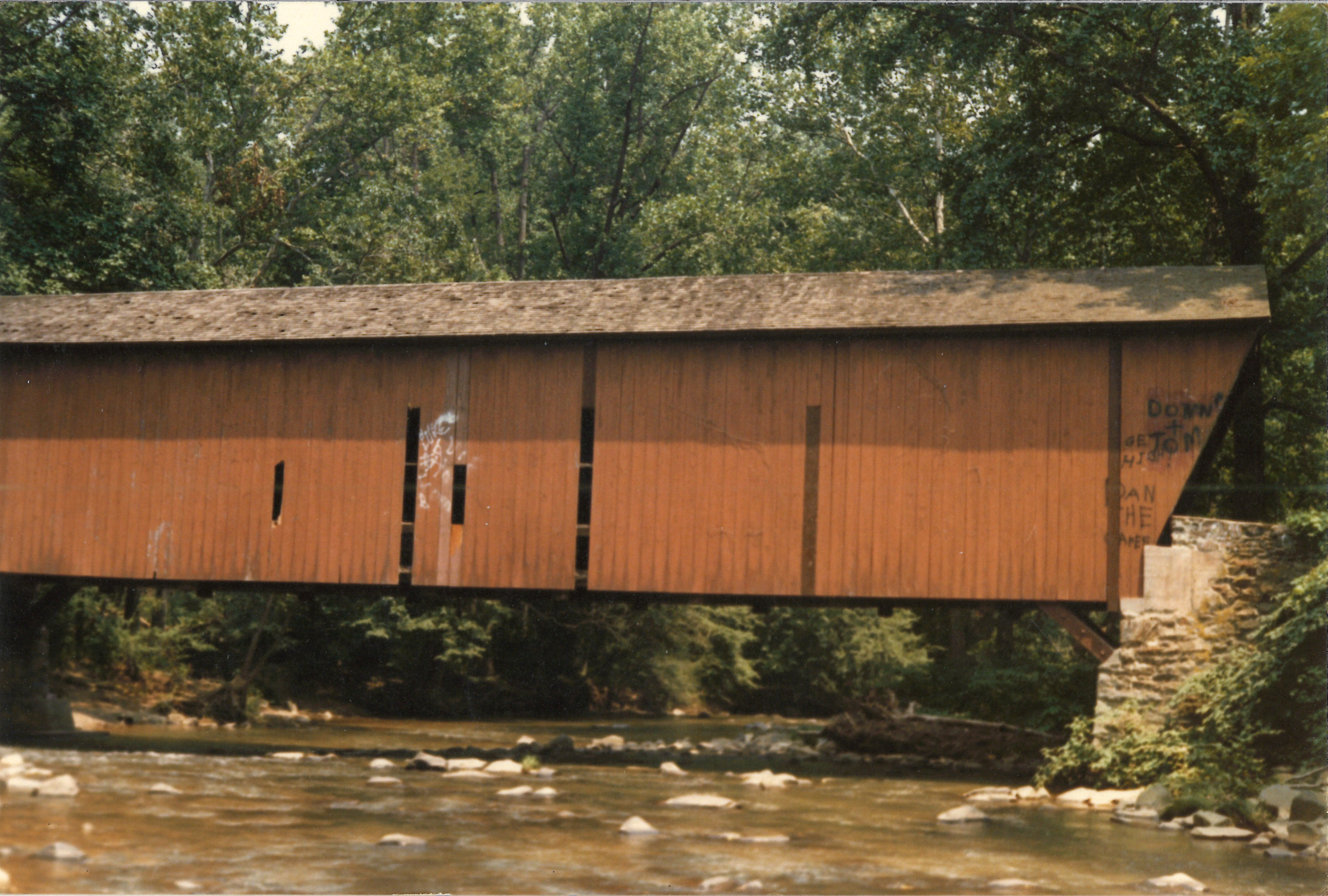
Loy's Station from 1980s

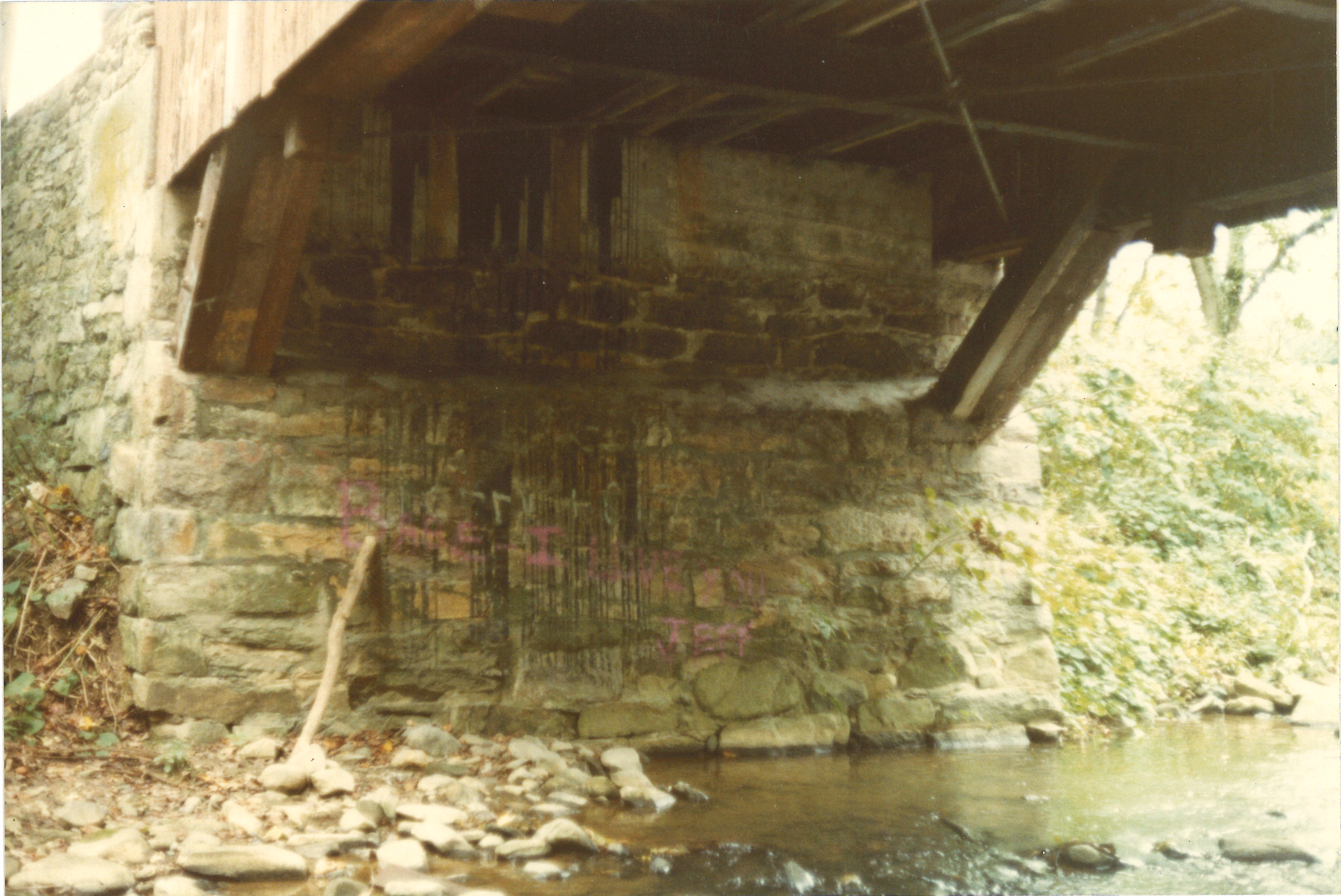
Loy's Station Abutment Wall from 1980s

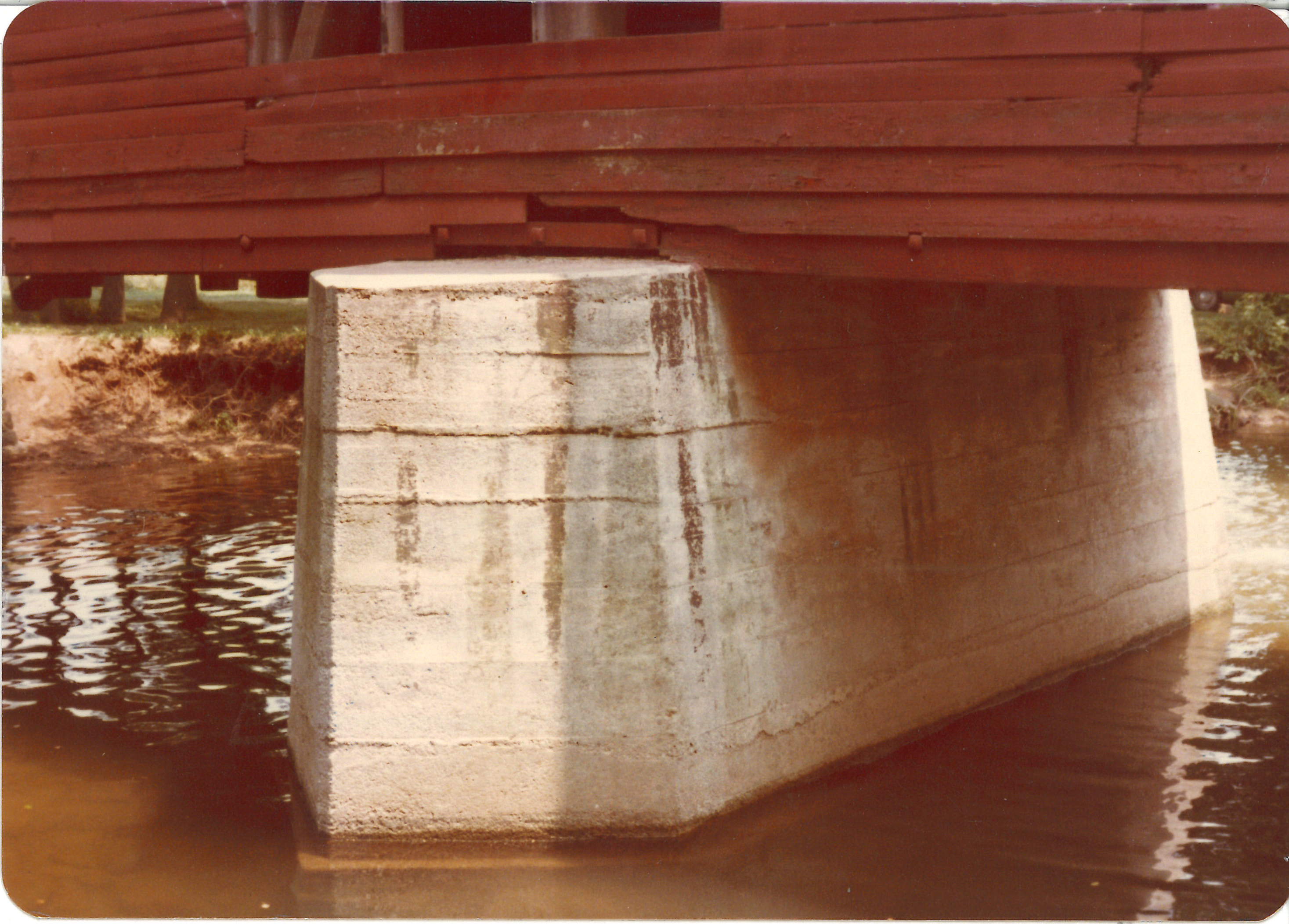
Loy's Station Pier Wall from 1980s

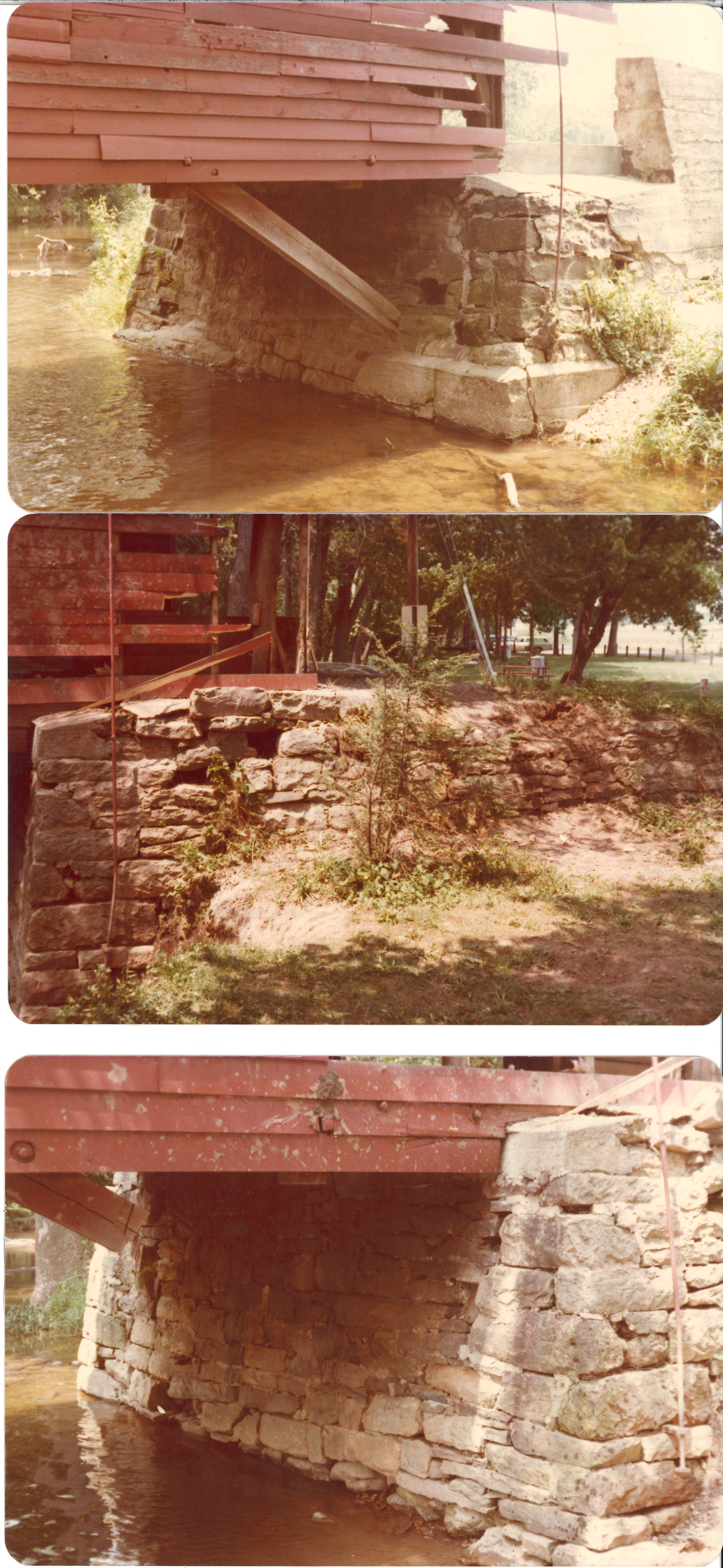
Loy's Station Field Condition from 1980s

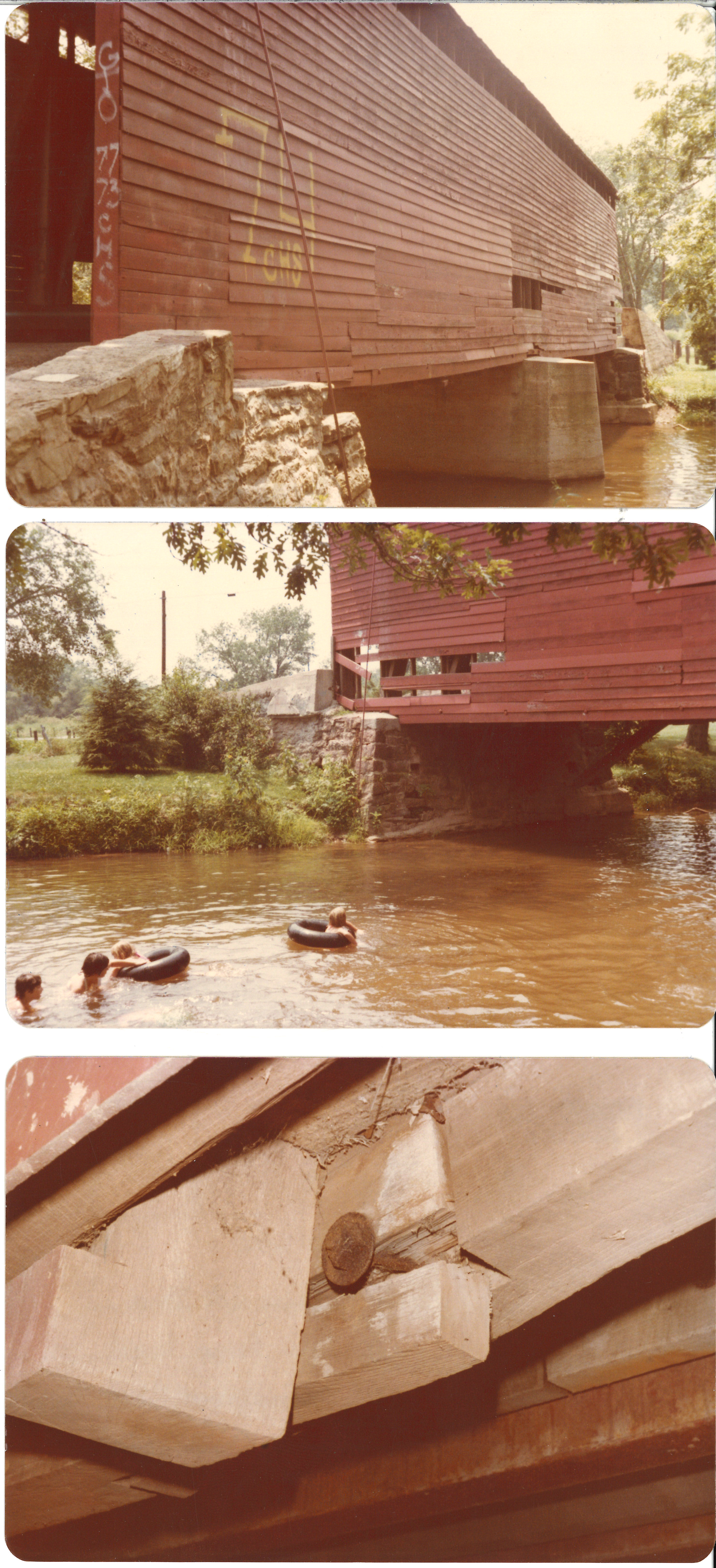
Loy's Station Field Condition from 1980s
