= National Register of Historic Places listings in Harford County, Maryland =

Location of Harford County in Maryland

This is a list of the National Register of Historic Places listings in Harford County, Maryland.

This is intended to be a complete list of the properties and districts on the National Register of Historic Places in Harford County, Maryland, United States. Latitude and longitude coordinates are provided for many National Register properties and districts; these locations may be seen together in a map.

There are 80 properties and districts listed on the National Register in the county, including one National Historic Landmark called Sion Hill.

Contents: Counties in Maryland
Allegany - Anne Arundel - Baltimore (city) - Baltimore County - Calvert - Caroline - Carroll - Cecil - Charles - Dorchester - Frederick - Garrett - Harford - Howard - Kent - Montgomery - Prince George's - Queen Anne's - Somerset - St. Mary's - Talbot - Washington - Wicomico - Worcester

This National Park Service list is complete through NPS recent listings posted May 1, 2026.

== Current listings ==
	Name on the Register	Image	Date listed	Location	City or town	Description
1	James B. Baker House	James B. Baker House	December 10, 1982 (#82001593)	452 W. Bel Air Ave. 39°30′45″N 76°10′25″W	Aberdeen	
2	Bel Air Armory	Bel Air Armory	September 25, 1985 (#85002667)	N. Main St. 39°32′15″N 76°21′01″W	Bel Air	
3	Bel Air Courthouse Historic District	Bel Air Courthouse Historic District	July 25, 1985 (#85001617)	Office, Courtland, and Main Sts. 39°32′08″N 76°20′59″W	Bel Air	
4	Berkley Crossroads Historic District	Berkley Crossroads Historic District	July 17, 2003 (#03000649)	Berkley Road and Castleton Rd. 39°39′46″N 76°12′19″W	Darlington	
5	Berkley School	Berkley School	July 22, 1988 (#88001011)	Castleton Rd., Maryland Route 623; 39°39′29″N 76°12′21″W	Darlington	
6	Best Endeavor	Best Endeavor	December 28, 1990 (#90001993)	1612 Calvary Rd. 39°30′12″N 76°15′55″W	Churchville	
7	Bon Air	Bon Air	November 10, 1977 (#77000697)	Laurel Brook Rd. 39°30′28″N 76°25′00″W	Fallston	
8	Broad Creek Soapstone Quarries	Broad Creek Soapstone Quarries	May 12, 1975 (#75000903)	Address Restricted	Whiteford	
9	Broom's Bloom	Broom's Bloom	December 19, 1991 (#91001778)	1616 S. Fountain Green Rd. 39°30′44″N 76°17′01″W	Bel Air	
10	Chestnut Ridge	Chestnut Ridge	December 1, 1983 (#83003780)	3850 W. Chapel Rd. 39°33′34″N 76°10′53″W	Aberdeen	
11	Church of the Holy Trinity	Church of the Holy Trinity	December 27, 2002 (#02001580)	2929 Level Rd. 39°33′39″N 76°14′48″W	Churchville	
12	Churchville Presbyterian Church	Churchville Presbyterian Church	August 21, 1986 (#86001733)	Intersection of Maryland Routes 22 and 136; 39°33′34″N 76°15′10″W	Churchville	
13	D. H. Springhouse	D. H. Springhouse	May 8, 1973 (#73000923)	About 6 miles (9.7 km) northeast of Bel Air on Sandy Hook Rd. 39°37′17″N 76°18′37″W	Bel Air	
14	Darlington Historic District	Darlington Historic District	September 10, 1987 (#87001571)	Main St., Shuresville Rd., Quaker Ln., Richmond Ave., and Trappe Church Rd. 39°38′23″N 76°12′03″W	Darlington	
15	Deer Creek Friends Meetinghouse	Deer Creek Friends Meetinghouse	April 23, 1980 (#80001817)	Maryland Route 161; 39°38′46″N 76°12′19″W	Darlington	
16	Dibb House	Dibb House	March 18, 1980 (#80001812)	East of Bel Air at 1737 Churchville Rd. 39°32′56″N 76°18′11″W	Bel Air	
17	Fair Meadows	Fair Meadows	November 25, 1980 (#80004255)	Creswell Rd. 39°29′57″N 76°15′58″W	Creswell	
18	Finney Houses Historic District	Finney Houses Historic District	June 16, 1989 (#89000502)	Glenville Rd. near its junction with Maryland Route 155; 39°34′20″N 76°14′20″W	Churchville	
19	Gladden Farm	Gladden Farm	May 28, 1993 (#93000444)	3881 Rocks Station Rd. 39°38′27″N 76°24′22″W	Street	
20	Graham-Crocker House	Graham-Crocker House	March 17, 1980 (#80001813)	30 N. Main St. 39°32′12″N 76°21′01″W	Bel Air	
21	Gray Gables	Gray Gables	March 27, 1986 (#86000582)	4528 Conowingo Rd. 39°39′13″N 76°13′15″W	Darlington	
22	Graystone Lodge	Graystone Lodge	August 30, 2007 (#07000858)	1118 Bel Air Rd. 39°30′44″N 76°22′24″W	Bel Air	
23	Griffith House	Griffith House	November 14, 1978 (#78001465)	Southwest of Aberdeen at 1120 Old Philadelphia Rd. 39°29′18″N 76°11′41″W	Aberdeen	
24	Gunpowder Meetinghouse	Gunpowder Meetinghouse	June 5, 1974 (#74000954)	Magnolia Rd. 39°24′13″N 76°18′29″W	Aberdeen Proving Ground	
25	Harford Furnace Historic District	Harford Furnace Historic District	July 18, 1990 (#90001020)	Creswell and Goat Hill Rds. 39°29′36″N 76°15′38″W	Bel Air	
26	Harford National Bank	Harford National Bank	March 20, 1980 (#80001814)	Wall and Courtland Sts. 39°32′07″N 76°20′59″W	Bel Air	Richardsonian Romanesque bank building now replaced by a court building
27	Havre de Grace Historic District	Havre de Grace Historic District	March 25, 1982 (#82002815)	Roughly bounded by Chesapeake Bay, the Susquehanna River, U.S. Route 40, and Stokes, Juniata, and Superior Sts. 39°32′49″N 76°05′29″W	Havre de Grace	
28	Havre de Grace Lighthouse	Havre de Grace Lighthouse	April 2, 1976 (#76000999)	Concord and Lafayette Sts. 39°32′26″N 76°05′07″W	Havre de Grace	
29	Hays House	Hays House	January 3, 1980 (#80001815)	324 S. Kenmore Ave. 39°31′57″N 76°20′52″W	Bel Air	
30	Hays-Heighe House	Hays-Heighe House	February 11, 1972 (#72000581)	401 Thomas Run Rd. 39°33′37″N 76°17′00″W	Bel Air	
31	Heighe House	Heighe House	November 1, 1990 (#90001568)	Junction of Southampton and Moores Mill Rds. 39°33′00″N 76°20′17″W	Bel Air	
32	Hidden Valley Farm	Hidden Valley Farm	January 17, 1983 (#83002950)	2916 Green Rd. 39°31′35″N 76°29′59″W	Baldwin	
33	Hirsch Residence	Hirsch Residence	February 2, 2023 (#100008592)	605 Giles St. 39°32′23″N 76°05′39″W	Havre de Grace	
34	Husband Flint Mill Site	Husband Flint Mill Site	June 18, 1975 (#75000902)	Address Restricted	Kalmia	
35	Ivory Mills	Ivory Mills	August 29, 1997 (#97000968)	4916 Harford Creamery Rd. 39°40′28″N 76°32′15″W	White Hall	
36	Jericho Covered Bridge	Jericho Covered Bridge	September 13, 1978 (#78001444)	East of Kingsville on Jericho Rd. 39°27′34″N 76°23′16″W	Jerusalem	
37	Jerusalem Mill Village	Jerusalem Mill Village	August 20, 1987 (#87001400)	Jerusalem and Jericho Rds. 39°27′41″N 76°23′23″W	Jerusalem	
38	Joshua's Meadows	Joshua's Meadows	December 21, 1982 (#82001594)	300 N. Tollgate Rd. 39°31′18″N 76°21′54″W	Bel Air	
39	Ladew Topiary Gardens and House	Ladew Topiary Gardens and House	May 13, 1976 (#76001002)	3535 Jarrettsville Pike (Maryland Route 146); 39°34′52″N 76°30′44″W	Taylor	Historic home and 1930s topiary gardens on a 250-acre (1.0 km^{2}) estate.
40	Liriodendron	Liriodendron	September 27, 1980 (#80001816)	501 and 502 W. Gordon St. 39°32′01″N 76°21′40″W	Bel Air	
41	Little Falls Meetinghouse	Little Falls Meetinghouse	May 7, 1980 (#80001818)	Old Fallston Rd. 39°30′33″N 76°24′23″W	Fallston	
42	Lower Deer Creek Valley Historic District	Lower Deer Creek Valley Historic District	November 3, 1993 (#93001143)	Roughly bounded by the Susquehanna River, Maryland Route 543, and Harmony, Church, and Trappe Rds. 39°36′43″N 76°14′05″W	Darlington	
43	MARTHA LEWIS (skipjack)	MARTHA LEWIS (skipjack)	December 11, 2008 (#08001175)	Millard Tydings Memorial Park, Commerce St. at S. Strawberry La. 39°32′18″N 76°05′25″W	Havre de Grace	Chesapeake Bay Skipjack Fleet TR
44	McComas Institute	McComas Institute	September 8, 1980 (#80001819)	North of Joppa on Singer Rd. 39°28′02″N 76°21′30″W	Joppa	
45	Medical Hall Historic District	Medical Hall Historic District	August 28, 1973 (#73000926)	West of Churchville off Maryland Route 154; 39°34′24″N 76°16′20″W	Churchville	
46	Mill Green Historic District	Mill Green Historic District	June 3, 1993 (#93000445)	Junction of Mill Green and Prospect Rds. 39°39′50″N 76°19′34″W	Street	
47	Mount Adams	Mount Adams	October 27, 1988 (#88002062)	1912 Fountain Green Rd. 39°30′27″N 76°16′52″W	Bel Air	
48	My Lady's Manor	My Lady's Manor	April 15, 1978 (#78001445)	Maryland Route 138; 39°35′15″N 76°34′16″W	Jarrettsville	
49	Nelson-Reardon-Kennard House	Nelson-Reardon-Kennard House	April 15, 1991 (#91000001)	3604 Philadelphia Rd. 39°27′51″N 76°16′45″W	Abingdon	
50	Norris-Stirling House	Norris-Stirling House	May 30, 1979 (#79001135)	Ring Factory Rd. 39°29′26″N 76°21′31″W	Bel Air	
51	Odd Fellows Lodge	Odd Fellows Lodge	August 22, 1975 (#75000901)	21 Pennsylvania Ave. 39°32′13″N 76°20′56″W	Bel Air	
52	Old Joppa Site	Old Joppa Site	August 24, 1979 (#79001136)	Address Restricted	Joppatowne	
53	Olney	Olney	July 9, 1987 (#87001197)	1001 Old Joppa Rd. 39°28′39″N 76°22′11″W	Joppa	
54	Pooles Island Lighthouse	Pooles Island Lighthouse	February 19, 1997 (#97000060)	Northwestern portion of Poole's Island and southeast of Rickett Point at Aberdeen Proving Ground; 39°17′26″N 76°15′59″W	Edgewood	
55	Poplar Hill	Poplar Hill	May 28, 1976 (#76000998)	115 Poplar Hill Rd. 39°29′46″N 76°10′17″W	Aberdeen	
56	Presbury Meetinghouse	Presbury Meetinghouse	May 23, 1974 (#74000955)	Austin and Parrish Rds. 39°23′15″N 76°18′24″W	Aberdeen Proving Ground	
57	Priest Neal's Mass House and Mill Site	Priest Neal's Mass House and Mill Site	March 15, 1990 (#90000352)	2618 Cool Spring Rd. 39°35′55″N 76°15′33″W	Bel Air	
58	Proctor House	Proctor House	March 23, 1990 (#90000376)	54 E. Gordon St. 39°32′24″N 76°21′06″W	Bel Air	
59	Rigbie House	Rigbie House	August 14, 1973 (#73000925)	Southeast of Berkley off Maryland Route 623; 39°39′37″N 76°12′12″W	Berkley	
60	Rockdale	Rockdale	June 30, 1982 (#82002814)	North of Fallston at 1724 Carrs Mill Rd. 39°32′03″N 76°24′19″W	Fallston	
61	St. George's Parish Vestry House	St. George's Parish Vestry House	March 26, 1976 (#76001001)	1522 Perryman Rd. 39°28′27″N 76°12′16″W	Perryman	
62	St. Ignatius Church	St. Ignatius Church	April 16, 1974 (#74000956)	533 E. Jarrettsville Rd. 39°34′25″N 76°21′19″W	Forest Hill	
63	St. Mary's Church	St. Mary's Church	March 30, 1973 (#73000928)	South of Emmorton on Maryland Route 24; 39°29′16″N 76°19′04″W	Emmorton	
64	Silver Houses Historic District	Silver Houses Historic District	September 7, 1984 (#84001800)	South of Darlington on Maryland Route 161; 39°36′22″N 76°11′47″W	Darlington	
65	Sion Hill	Sion Hill	April 30, 1990 (#90000608)	2026 Level Rd. 39°33′42″N 76°07′32″W	Havre de Grace	Historic home of U.S. Navy officers including Commodore John Rodgers.
66	Slate Ridge School	Slate Ridge School	July 16, 1987 (#87000657)	Old Pylesville Rd. 39°42′45″N 76°20′25″W	Whiteford	
67	Sophia's Dairy	Sophia's Dairy	September 20, 1973 (#73000922)	Southwest of Aberdeen off U.S. Route 40; 39°28′24″N 76°14′03″W	Aberdeen	
68	Southern Terminal, Susquehanna and Tidewater Canal	Southern Terminal, Susquehanna and Tidewater Canal	May 28, 1976 (#76001000)	North of Erie St. between Conesteo St. and the Susquehanna River; 39°33′24″N 76°05′41″W	Havre de Grace	
69	Col. John Streett House	Col. John Streett House	July 16, 1990 (#90001022)	Northern side of Holy Cross Rd. east of Deer Creek; 39°39′27″N 76°26′04″W	Street	
70	Swansbury	Swansbury	July 15, 1994 (#94000730)	Beard's Hill Rd. Extended, northeast of Aberdeen; 39°31′18″N 76°09′11″W	Aberdeen	
71	Thomas Run Church	Thomas Run Church	January 3, 1978 (#78001466)	Northeast of Bel Air off Maryland Route 136; 39°35′32″N 76°17′34″W	Bel Air	
72	Tudor Hall	Tudor Hall	March 14, 1973 (#73000924)	Northeast of Bel Air off Maryland Route 22; 39°33′15″N 76°18′11″W	Bel Air	
73	The Vineyard	The Vineyard	July 22, 1994 (#94000762)	1201 Conowingo Rd. (U.S. Route 1); 39°33′56″N 76°20′34″W	Bel Air	
74	Webster's Forest	Webster's Forest	September 1, 1983 (#83002951)	500 Asbury Rd. 39°32′32″N 76°15′51″W	Churchville	
75	Whitaker's Mill Historic District	Whitaker's Mill Historic District	July 16, 1990 (#90001021)	1210, 1212, and 1213 Whitaker Mill Rd. 39°29′51″N 76°21′15″W	Joppa	
76	Whiteford-Cardiff Historic District	Whiteford-Cardiff Historic District	November 15, 2005 (#05001278)	Whiteford Rd., Platted Parry St., Quarry Rd., west of Main St.; split between Maryland and Pennsylvania; 39°42′56″N 76°20′19″W	Whiteford	
77	Wildfell	Wildfell	September 20, 1973 (#73000927)	Northwest of Darlington on U.S. Route 1; 39°39′04″N 76°13′11″W	Darlington	
78	Winsted	Winsted	September 19, 1979 (#79003266)	North of Aberdeen at 3844 W. Chapel Rd. 39°33′36″N 76°10′54″W	Aberdeen	
79	Woodside	Woodside	November 1, 1979 (#79001134)	Northwest of Abingdon at 400 Singer Rd; 39°28′47″N 76°19′22″W	Abingdon	
80	Woodview	Woodview	October 25, 1990 (#90001574)	1236 Somerville Rd. 39°29′47″N 76°20′56″W	Bel Air	

== See also ==
- List of National Historic Landmarks in Maryland
- National Register of Historic Places listings in Maryland
