= U.S. Route 1 Business (Bel Air, Maryland) =

Highway in Maryland

U.S. Route 1 Business

Route information
- Auxiliary route of US 1
- Maintained by MDSHA
- Length: 6.90 mi (11.10 km)
- Existed: 1966–present

Major junctions
- South end: US 1 / MD 147 in Benson
- MD 24 in Bel Air; MD 22 / MD 924 in Bel Air; MD 23 in Hickory; MD 543 in Hickory
- North end: US 1 near Hickory

Location
- Country: United States
- State: Maryland
- Counties: Harford

Highway system
- United States Numbered Highway System; List; Special; Divided; Maryland highway system; Interstate; US; State; Scenic Byways

U.S. Route 1 Business (US 1 Bus.) is a business route of US 1 in the U.S. state of Maryland. The highway runs 6.90 miles (11.10 km) from US 1 and Maryland Route 147 (MD 147) in Benson north to US 1 near Hickory. US 1 Bus. is the old alignment of US 1 through Bel Air, the county seat of Harford County. US 1 was originally constructed on both sides of Bel Air in the early 1910s. The U.S. Route was widened in the 1920s, 1930s, and 1950s. US 1 Bus. was assigned to the highway from Benson through Bel Air to south of Hickory after the Bel Air Bypass was built in the mid-1960s. US 1 Bus. was extended north through Hickory when US 1 bypassed Hickory in 2000.

== Route description ==
US 1 Bus. begins at an intersection with US 1 and MD 147 in the community of Benson. US 1 heads north as the Bel Air Bypass and south as Belair Road. MD 147 (Harford Road) forms the west leg of the intersection opposite US 1 Bus., which heads east as Belair Road, a three-lane road with center turn lane that passes the Graystone Lodge at its intersection with Old Joppa Road. US 1 Bus. crosses Winters Run at a place known as Lake Fanny Hill just to the north of a loop of old alignment that uses US 1's original bridge over the stream. East of the Lake Fanny area, the business route enters a commercial area and expands to a five-lane road with center turn lane. The highway enters the town of Bel Air just west of its intersection with Tollgate Road. US 1 Bus. intersects MD 24 (Vietnam Veterans Memorial Highway) surrounded by shopping centers, including the Harford Mall on the northwest corner.

US 1 Bus. continues east as the Baltimore Pike to downtown Bel Air. The business route intersects Bond Street, which carries southbound MD 924, and becomes one-way eastbound. At the next intersection with Main Street, the street continues as the eastbound lanes of MD 22 (Fulford Avenue) while US 1 Bus. turns north onto Main Street, where the business route runs concurrently with northbound MD 924. The two directions of US 1 Bus. pass through Bel Air Courthouse Historic District, which includes the Harford County courthouse and county offices. The business route also passes by Odd Fellows Lodge, Bel Air Armory, and the Graham-Crocker House. The southbound business route passes the historic Harford National Bank building. North of downtown, the two directions of the business route come together at Gordon Street, which heads east past Proctor House and west to the historic estate Liriodendron. One block to the north, MD 924 continues straight toward Forest Hill while US 1 Bus. turns east onto Broadway.

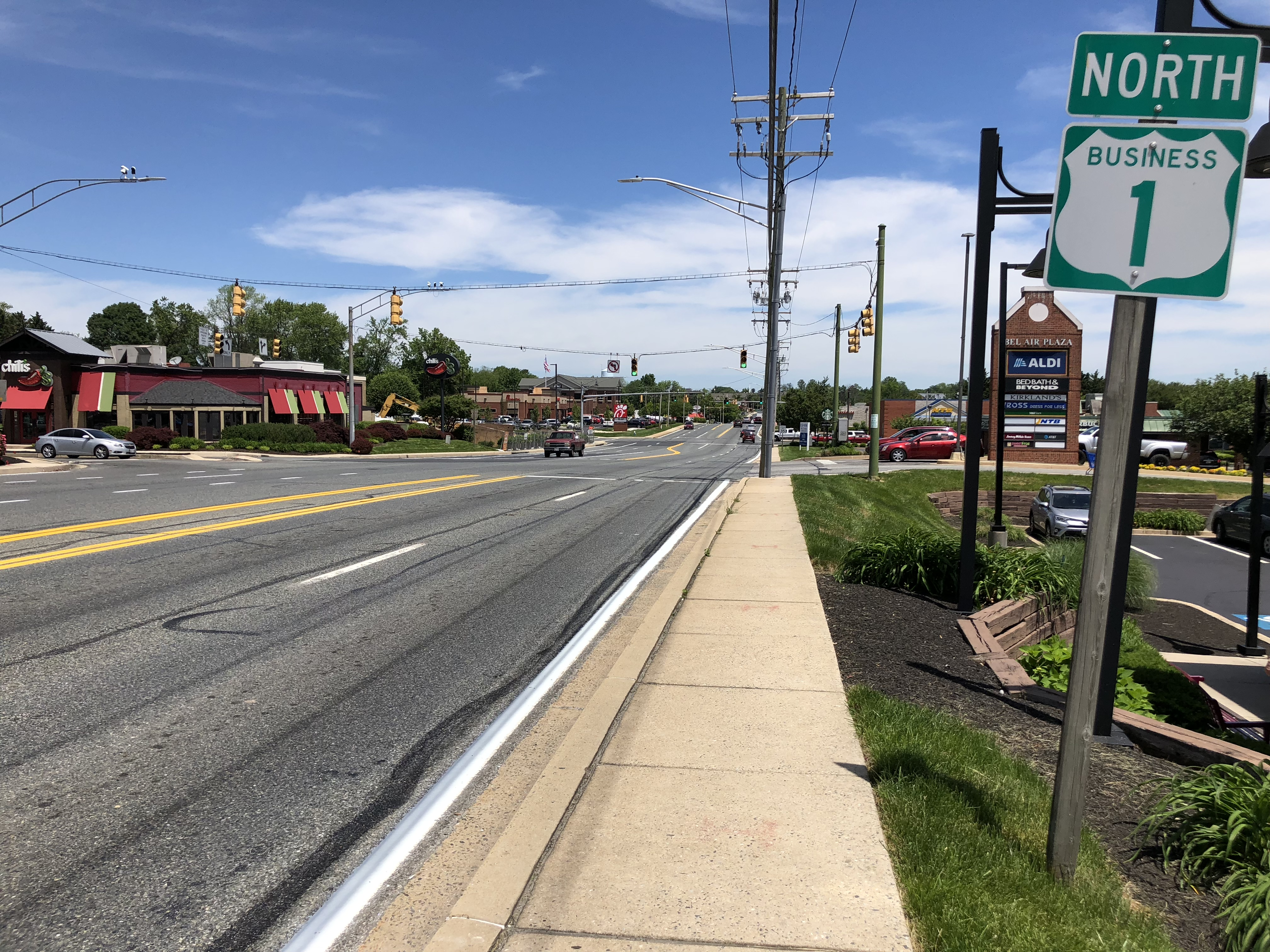
View north along US 1 Bus. at MD 24 in Bel Air

US 1 Bus. follows two-lane Broadway east to Hickory Avenue, onto which the business route turns north. At the northern limit of Bel Air, the business route intersects Moores Mill Road, which heads east toward Heighe House. US 1 Bus. crosses Bynum Run and continues north as Conowingo Road, which becomes a three-lane road just before the entrance to the farm complex The Vineyard. The business route intersects US 1 at the northern end of the Bel Air Bypass; the U.S. highway continues north as the Hickory Bypass. US 1 Bus. becomes a two-lane road at the present alignment of MD 23 (East–West Highway). The business route intersects the old alignment of the state highway, Jarrettsville Road, adjacent to St. Ignatius Church, then veers east through the center of Hickory. US 1 Bus. intersects MD 543 (Ady Road) before reaching its northern terminus at US 1 at the northern end of the Hickory Bypass. Conowingo Road continues north as mainline US 1 through northeastern Harford County.

US 1 Bus. is a part of the National Highway System as a principal arterial from US 1 and MD 147 at Benson to MD 924 in Bel Air.

== History ==
The highway that was to become US 1 through Bel Air was designated one of the original state roads to be improved by the Maryland State Roads Commission in 1909. By 1910, Conowingo Road had already been paved from the corner of Broadway and Hickory Avenue in Bel Air north through Hickory. Belair Road from Benson to Archer Street in Bel Air was constructed as a 14-foot-wide (4.3 m) macadam road in 1913. That project included the construction of a new bridge over Winters Run at Lake Fanny Hill the same year. After incremental improvements to the road at Lake Fanny Hill in the late 1910s proved insufficient, the present bridge was constructed over Winters Run and the dangerous curve was bypassed in 1930.

By 1930, US 1 had been widened to 20 feet (6.1 m) throughout Harford County with the construction of concrete shoulders. Widening of Belair Road to 30 feet (9.1 m) from Baltimore County to downtown Bel Air was underway by 1934 and completed in 1936. By 1938, US 1 entered downtown Bel Air on the Baltimore Pike, turned north onto Bond Street, followed Main Street—which in 1938 also became part of MD 24—to Broadway, then followed Broadway to Hickory Avenue. Around 1940, the portions of Bond and Main streets that carried US 1 were expanded to 40 feet (12 m) in width. US 1 was expanded further following World War II: the highway was reconstructed and widened from downtown Bel Air through Hickory between 1950 and 1952 and from Benson to Bel Air by 1954.

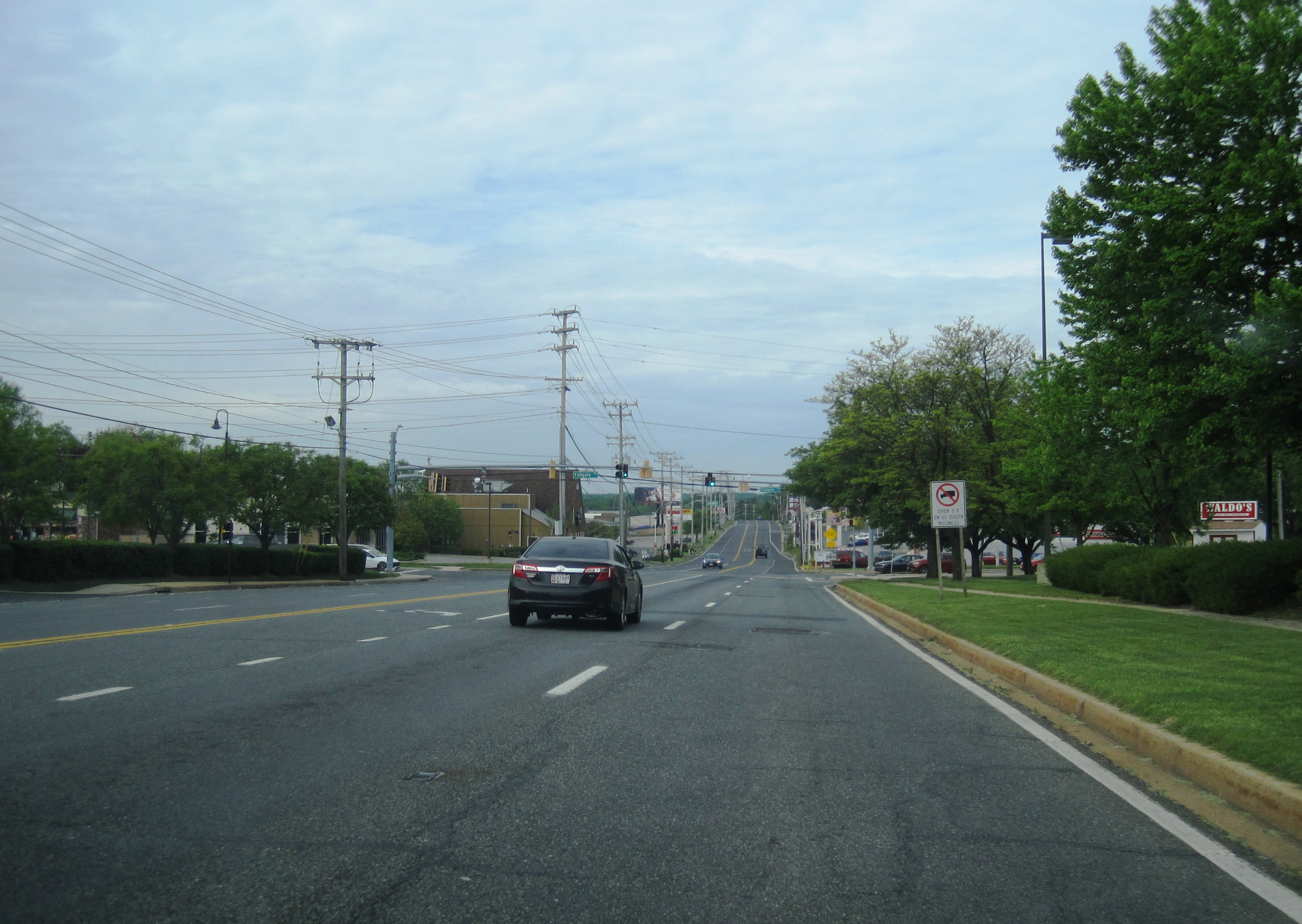
US 1 Bus. southbound at Tollgate Road, the site of a bomb detonation on March 10, 1970

Construction on the Bel Air Bypass got underway in 1963. The bypass was originally planned to pass around Hickory as well, but the northern extension was postponed by 1966. When the bypass opened in 1965, taking US 1 out of downtown Bel Air, Belair Road from Benson to downtown Bel Air was temporarily designated as an extension of MD 147. By 1966, US 1 Bus. was assigned from Benson north to the end of the bypass south of Hickory. The extension of the Bel Air Bypass around Hickory was constructed in 2000. US 1 was subsequently placed on the new bypass, and US 1 Bus. was extended to its current length.

On March 10, 1970, at the modern day intersection of US 1 Bus. and Tollgate Road in Bel Air, a bomb exploded in the car of two friends of H. Rap Brown, who was set to appear in court in the town facing charges of inciting a riot in Cambridge.

== Junction list ==
The entire route is in Harford County.

Location	mi	km	Destinations	Notes
Benson	0.00	0.00	US 1 (Bel Air Bypass/Belair Road) / MD 147 south (Harford Road) – Baltimore, Rising Sun	Southern terminus
Bel Air	1.98	3.19	MD 24 (Vietnam Veterans Memorial Highway) – Edgewood, Forest Hill	
Bel Air	2.58	4.15	MD 924 south (Bond Street) – Emmorton	Southern end of MD 924 concurrency
Bel Air	2.65	4.26	MD 22 east (Fulford Avenue) – Aberdeen, Havre de Grace	US 1 Bus. turns north onto Main Street; western terminus of MD 22
Bel Air	3.22	5.18	MD 924 north (Main Street) / Broadway west – Forest Hill	US 1 Bus. turns east onto Broadway; northern end of MD 924 concurrency
Bel Air	3.57	5.75	Broadway east / Hickory Avenue south	US 1 Bus. turns north onto Hickory Avenue
Hickory	5.32	8.56	US 1 (Bel Air Bypass / Hickory Bypass) – Baltimore, Rising Sun	
Hickory	5.59	9.00	MD 23 (East–West Highway) – Jarrettsville	
Hickory	6.39	10.28	MD 543 (Ady Road) – Pylesville, Fountain Green	
Hickory	6.90	11.10	US 1 (Conowingo Road / Hickory Bypass) – Rising Sun, Bel Air	Northern terminus
1.000 mi = 1.609 km; 1.000 km = 0.621 mi: Concurrency terminus
