= Maryland Route 924 =

State highway in Maryland, United States

Maryland Route 924

Route information
- Maintained by MDSHA
- Length: 7.39 mi (11.89 km)
- Existed: 1987–present

Major junctions
- South end: MD 24 near Emmorton
- MD 22 in Bel Air; US 1 Bus. in Bel Air
- North end: US 1 / MD 24 near Bel Air

Location
- Country: United States
- State: Maryland
- Counties: Harford

Highway system
- Maryland highway system; Interstate; US; State; Scenic Byways
← MD 922	→ MD 925

Maryland Route 924 (MD 924) is a state highway in the U.S. state of Maryland. The state highway runs 7.39 miles (11.89 km) from MD 24 near Emmorton to U.S. Route 1 (US 1) and MD 24 in Bel Air. MD 924 is the old alignment of MD 24 through the Bel Air area in central Harford County. The state highway was originally constructed in the late 1920s and early 1930s. MD 924 was assigned when MD 24 was moved to a new divided highway to the west in 1987.

== Route description ==
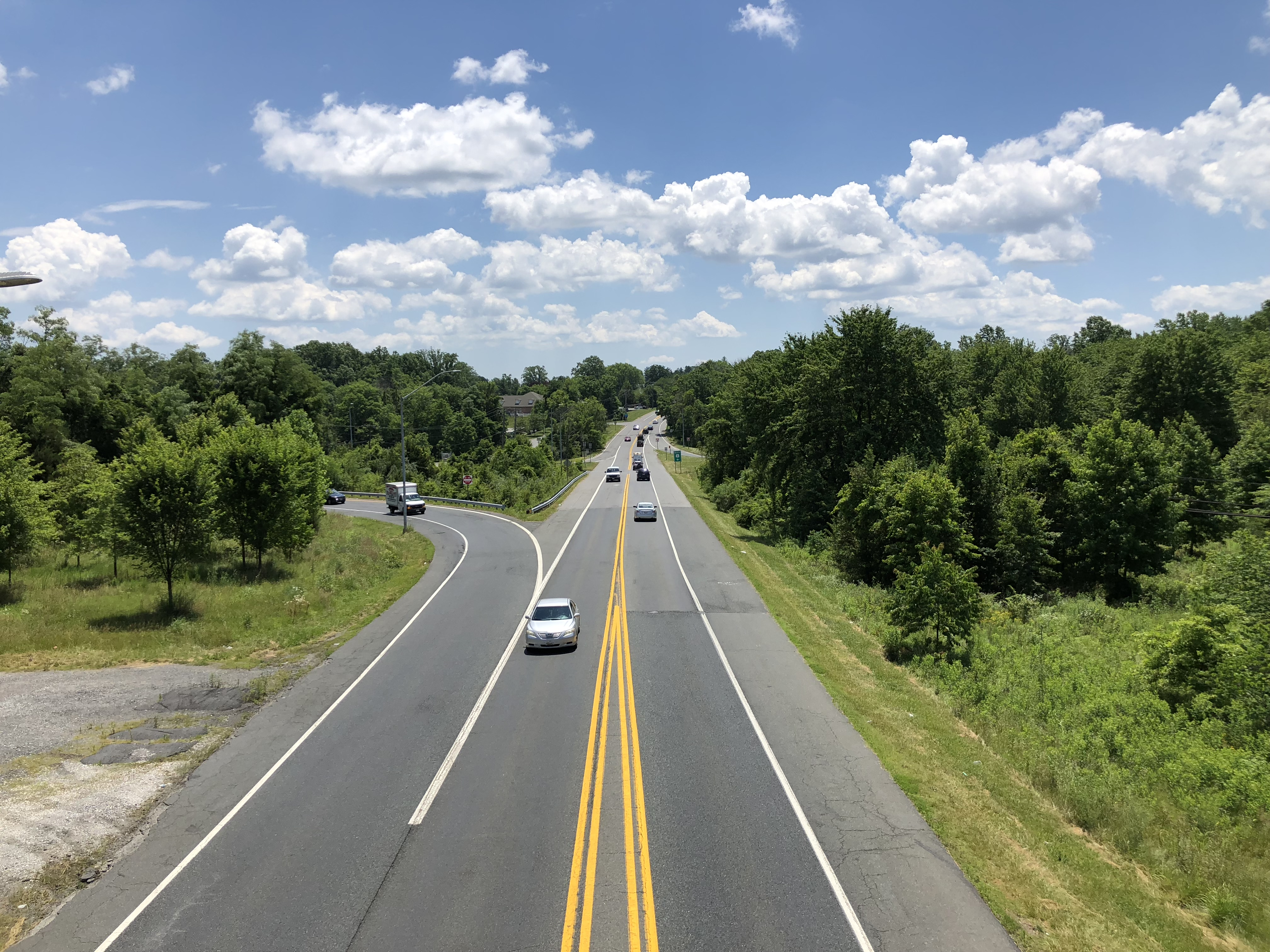
View south along MD 924 from US 1/MD 24 in Bel Air North

MD 924 begins at a diamond interchange with MD 24 (Vietnam Veterans Memorial Highway) just north of the MD 24's interchange with Interstate 95 (I-95) near Emmorton. The roadway continues west and then north on the opposite side of the interchange as county-maintained Tollgate Road. MD 924 passes north of a park and ride lot and heads northeast and then north as two-lane undivided Emmorton Road. The state highway gains a center turn lane as it passes between several residential subdivisions and a few shopping centers around its intersection with Singer Road and Abingdon Road at Norris Corner. After passing St. Mary's Church, Old Emmorton Road splits to the east and MD 924 passes through the hamlet of Emmorton. The state highway gains a center left-turn lane at Wheel Road and continues north as a three-lane highway through suburban areas past its intersection with MacPhail Road, where the highway enters the town of Bel Air and its name changes to Main Street.

MD 924 remains a three-lane street until the highway splits into a one-way pair at Linwood Avenue at the southern edge of downtown Bel Air. Northbound MD 924 continues on Main Street while the southbound direction follows Bond Street one block to the west. Within the Bel Air Courthouse Historic District, which contains the county courthouse and county offices at the center of the county seat, the one-way pair intersects another one-way pair, Fulford Avenue eastbound and Churchville Road westbound. Those streets head east from Main Street as MD 22 and west as US 1 Business, which joins MD 924 in a concurrency. Within the downtown area, MD 924 passes the Harford National Bank building, the Odd Fellows Lodge, the Graham-Crocker House, the Bel Air Armory, and the Hays House, now a museum and home of the Harford County Historical Society.

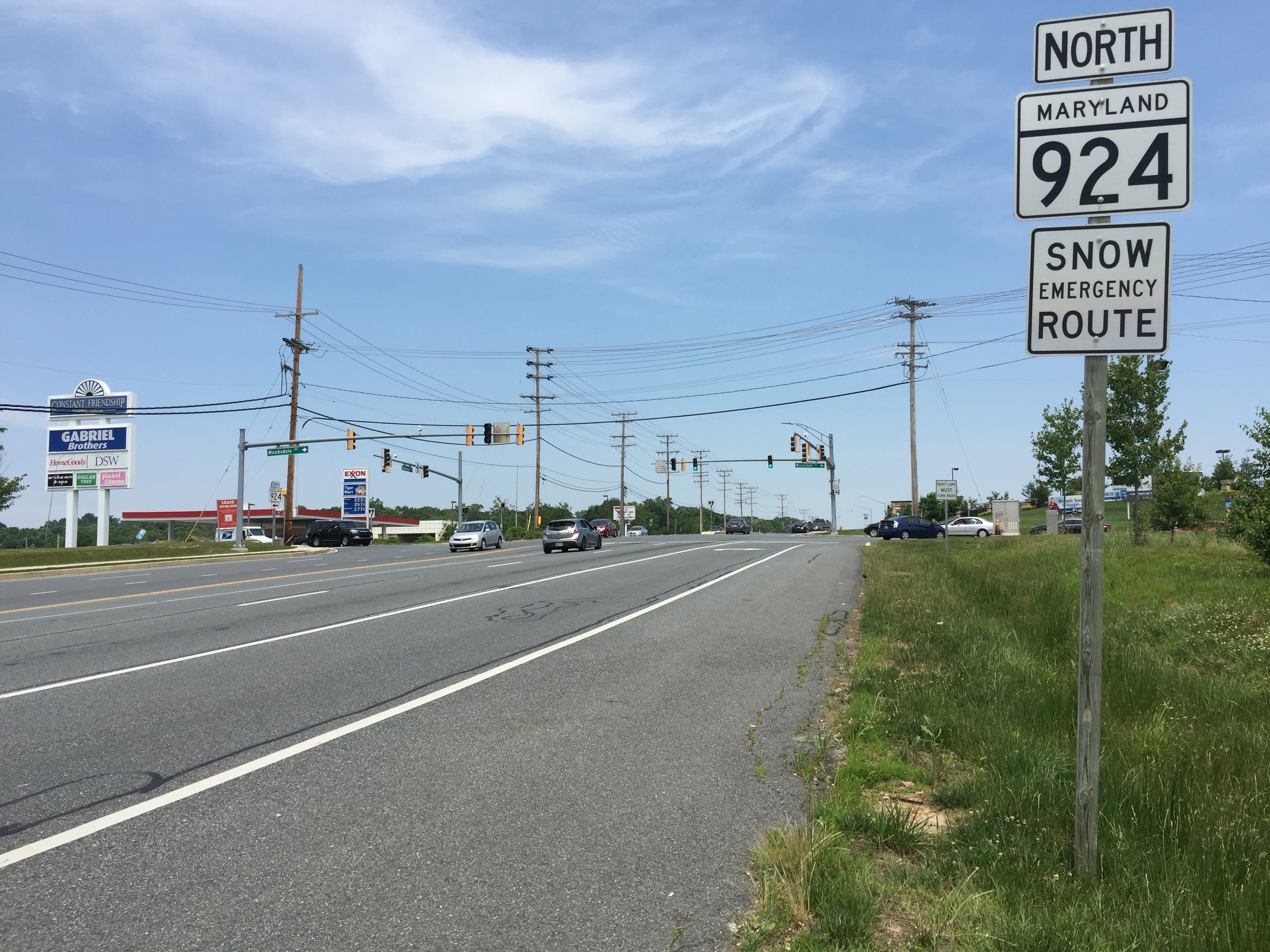
View north from the south end of MD 924 at MD 24 near Emmorton

The two directions of the one-way pair come together at Gordon Street on the north side of downtown. Gordon Street leads west to the historic home Liriodendron and east to the historic Proctor House. One block to the north, US 1 Business turns northeast onto Broadway. MD 924's name changes to Rock Spring Road at Maulsby Avenue. The state highway heads through the northern part of the town as a three-lane road with a center left-turn lane to its northern terminus at a partial cloverleaf interchange with the Bel Air Bypass, which carries US 1. Southbound MD 24 follows the Bel Air Bypass around the northwest side of the town and then south to the other end of MD 924. The roadway continues as MD 24 north toward Forest Hill.

== History ==
Construction on what is now MD 924 got underway with the construction of a 1-mile (1.6 km) section of macadam road from Ring Factory Road south to Plumtree Road near Emmorton between 1925 and 1927. Another macadam segment was completed from Emmorton south to Singer Road at Norris Corner in 1928. A concrete highway from Norris Corner toward US 40 in Edgewood, as well as a macadam road along Rock Spring Avenue from Bel Air to the community of Frogtown, which is the location of the Bel Air Bypass, was started in 1929. The first section of the road toward Edgewood, which includes the southernmost part of MD 924, was completed to approximately the location of I-95 in 1930. The road to Frogtown was also completed in 1930. Two county highway gaps in the state highway from Edgewood to Bel Air—from Ring Factory Road to Bel Air and from Emmorton to Plumtree Road—were resurfaced with macadam and brought into the state system in 1933. All of modern MD 924 was designated as a southern extension of MD 24 in 1938; MD 24 originally had its southern terminus in Forest Hill.

When the Vietnam Veterans Memorial Highway was under construction in 1986, the old alignment of MD 24 was provisionally marked as a northern segment of MD 755, which is the designation for old MD 24 in Edgewood. MD 924 was assigned to the old alignment of MD 24 between Edgewood and the Bel Air Bypass when MD 24 was moved to the Vietnam Veterans Memorial Highway in 1987. In late 2008, the Maryland Transportation Authority began a project to build a diamond interchange at MD 24's junction with MD 924 and Tollgate Road just north of I-95. The interchange opened in 2011.

== Junction list ==
The entire route is in Harford County.

Location	mi	km	Destinations	Notes
Emmorton	0.00	0.00	MD 24 (Vietnam Veterans Memorial Highway) to I-95 / Tollgate Road north – Bel Air, Edgewood, Baltimore	Diamond interchange; southern terminus
Bel Air	5.25	8.45	Heighe Street	South end of MD 924 one-way pair
Bel Air	5.50	8.85	MD 22 east (Fulford Avenue) / US 1 Bus. south – Churchville, Aberdeen	Western terminus of eastbound direction of MD 22; south end of concurrency with US 1 Bus.
Bel Air	5.56	8.95	US 1 Bus. south (Churchville Road) – Baltimore	Western terminus of westbound direction of MD 22; Churchville Road heads west as unsigned MD 922E
Bel Air	6.00	9.66	MD 924 south / US 1 Bus. south (Bond Street)	North end of MD 924 one-way pair
Bel Air	6.07	9.77	US 1 Bus. north (Broadway) / Broadway west – Hickory	North end of concurrency with US 1 Bus.
Bel Air	7.39	11.89	US 1 (Bel Air Bypass) / MD 24 (Rock Spring Avenue) – Baltimore, Hickory, Forest Hill	Partial cloverleaf interchange; northern terminus
1.000 mi = 1.609 km; 1.000 km = 0.621 mi: Concurrency terminus
