= Harford County Airport =

Airport in Maryland, US

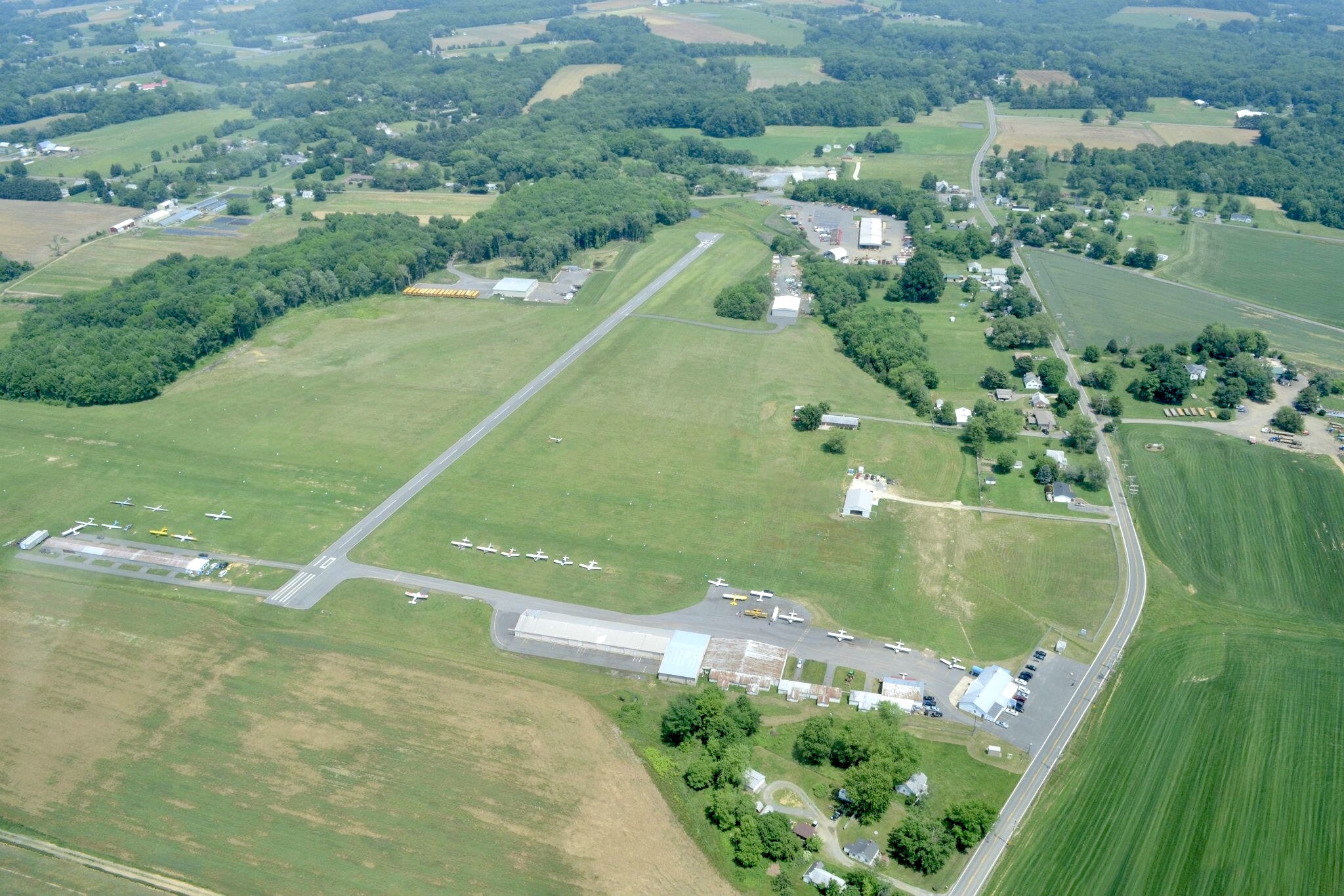
- Harford County Airport in 2014
- IATA: none; ICAO: none; FAA LID: 0W3

Summary
- Airport type: Public
- Owner: Harford County Airport Owners Group Inc.
- Operator: Harford Air Services
- Serves: Churchville, Havre de Grace, Aberdeen
- Location: Churchville, Maryland
- Elevation AMSL: 409 ft (125 m)
- Coordinates: 39.5668°N 76.2024°W
- Website: www.harfordair.com

Map
- Location of airport in Maryland

Runways
| Direction | Length | | Surface |
| Direction | ft | m | Surface |
|---|---|---|---|
| 10 / 28 | 2,000 | 871 | Asphalt |
| 01 / 19 | 2,856 | 610 | Asphalt |

Harford County Airport (FAA LID: 0W3) is a public airport located in the unincorporated community of Churchville, in Harford County, Maryland, United States.

Harford County Airport is a general aviation (GA) airport in northern Maryland that serves primarily recreational pilots. There used to be three runways at Harford, two turf/grass runways 01/19 and 14/32, as well as one paved/asphalt runway 10/28. As part of a major expansion project, in September of 2018, the turf runway 14/32 was permanently closed to make room for a paved parking area and new hangars. At the same time, runway 01/19 was closed to be paved and extended from 2000 feet to 2856 feet. In April of 2020, the new runway 01/19 opened to traffic.

The airport has a large sailplane/glider contingent and hosts some commercial flying activities, mainly sightseeing and flight training.

== Airport upgrades ==
The airport is currently obtaining permits to enable a generalized expansion. This expansion is aimed at increasing the overall safety of the airport and to attract new business into the surrounding area. The airport expansion will consist of eliminating two of the three existing runways and extending the length of one of its runways to just over 3,000 feet. This will allow aircraft to arrive and depart on a safer longer runway, while simultaneously reducing noise for the surrounding community. This expansion will also promote increased business revenue for many of the shops and restaurants in Bel Air, Churchville, Aberdeen, and Edgewood, and will serve as convenient access to those visiting the Aberdeen Proving Grounds.

On April 14, 2015, a judge ruled against a zoning appeal to stop the airport expansion. The completed runway 01/19 is 2,856 feet (871 m) long by 75 feet (23 m) wide.
