= Joshua's Meadows =

Historic house in Maryland, US

- U.S. National Register of Historic Places
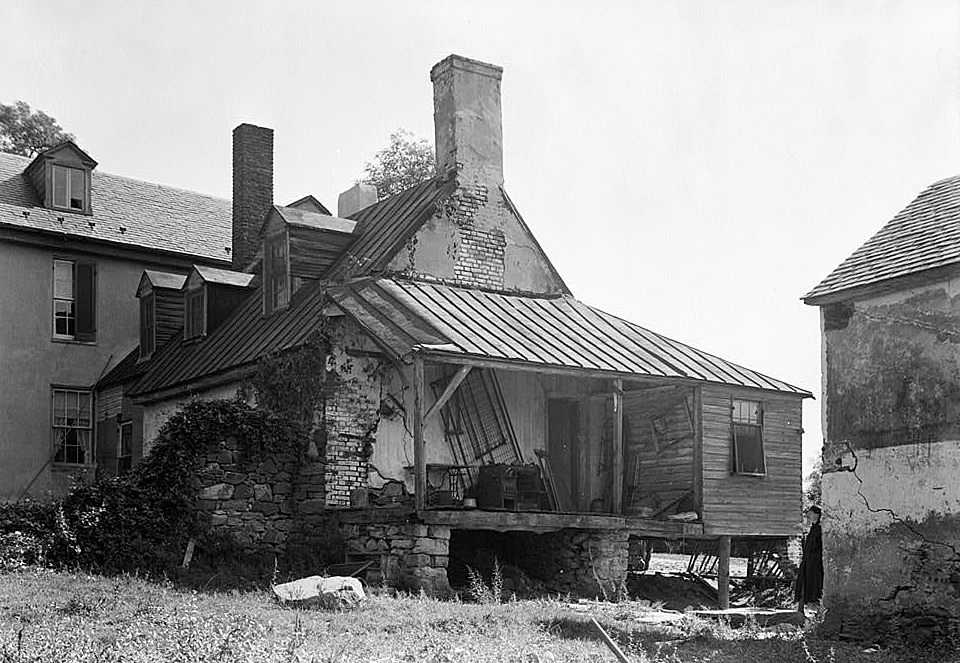
- Joshua's Meadows in 1936

- Location within Maryland Location within the United States
- Location: 300 N. Tollgate Rd., Bel Air, Maryland
- Coordinates: 39°31′18″N 76°21′54″W
- Area: 1 acre (0.40 ha)
- Built by: Bond, Thomas
- NRHP reference No.: 82001594
- Added to NRHP: December 21, 1982

Joshua's Meadows is a historic home located at Bel Air, Harford County, Maryland, United States. It is a three-part house: the two oldest sections are Flemish bond brick, T-shaped, gable roofed, built about 1750; and the third section is of native fieldstone and dates to 1937. The original house consists of two parts; a main 2 1/2-story 20-by-40-foot (6.1 by 12.2 m) house and a 1 1/2-story 16-by-20-foot (4.9 by 6.1 m) kitchen wing.

Joshua's Meadows was listed on the National Register of Historic Places in 1982.
