= Bel Air, Maryland =

Bel Air
- Town
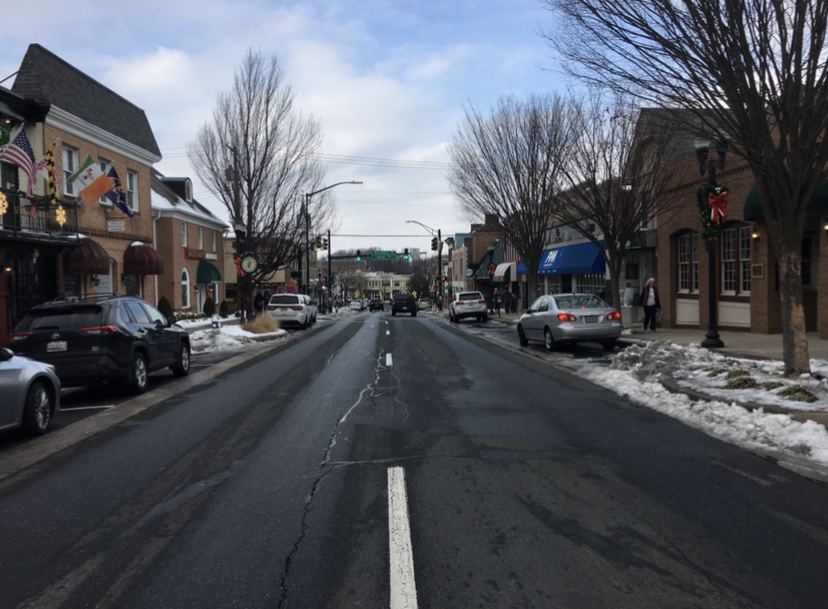
- Bel Air's South Main Street in December 2021

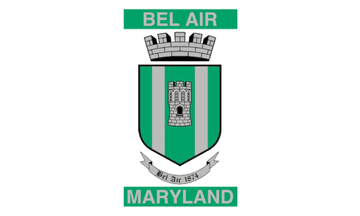
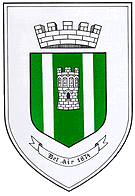
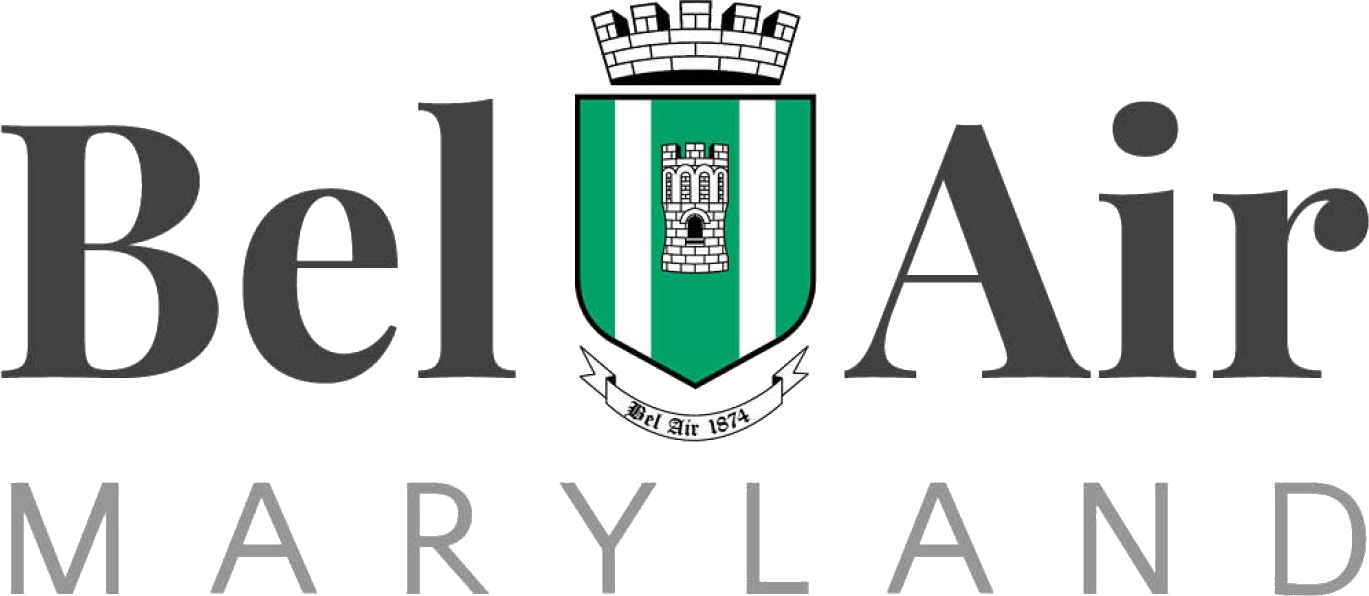
- Flag Seal Coat of arms Wordmark

- Location of Bel Air, Maryland

- Location within Maryland Location within the United States Location within North America
- Coordinates: 39°32′12″N 76°20′54″W
- Country: United States
- State: Maryland
- County: Harford
- Founded: 1780
- Incorporated: 1874

Government
  - Type: Council-Manager
  - Mayor: Paula Etting (R)

Area
  - Town: 3.04 sq mi (7.88 km^{2})
  - Land: 3.03 sq mi (7.85 km^{2})
  - Water: 0.0077 sq mi (0.02 km^{2})

Population (2020)
  - Town: 10,661
  - Density: 3,516.8/sq mi (1,357.84/km^{2})
  - Urban: 214,647 (US: 180th)
  - Urban density: 2,002.3/sq mi (773.1/km^{2})
- Time zone: UTC−5 (Eastern (EST))
  - Summer (DST): UTC−4 (EDT)
- ZIP Codes: 21014, 21015
- Area codes: 410, 443, and 667
- FIPS code: 24-05825
- Website: Bel Air, Maryland

Bel Air is a town and the county seat of Harford County, Maryland, United States. According to the 2020 United States census, the population of the town was 10,661.

The United States Census Bureau defines an urban area in northeast Maryland in which Bel Air is the principal settlement: the Bel Air–Aberdeen urban area had a population of 214,647 as of the 2020 census, making it the 180th most populous in the United States.

== History ==
Bel Air's identity has gone through several incarnations since 1780. Aquilla Scott, who had inherited land known as "Scott's Improvement Enlarged", planned the town on a portion that he called "Scott's Old Fields". Four years later, the town had expanded as local politicians, merchants, and innkeepers purchased lots from Scott, and the county commissioners decided to change its name to the more appealing "Belle Aire". In his deeds, Scott dropped one letter, renaming the town "Bell Aire". Around 1798, court records dropped two more letters, and "Bel Air" was born.

During this period, Bel Air began to rise in prominence. In 1782, just two years after its founding, it became Harford's county seat, and Daniel Scott (Aquilla's son) started building a courthouse on Main Street. Although the town limits in the late 18th century encompassed nothing more than the two sides of Main Street, the days following the Civil War saw a building and land-development boom that remains in full swing to this day.

Bel Air was part of a land grant issued to Daniel Scott in 1731. In March 1782 "Belle Aire" was designated the county seat of Harford County. At the turn of the 20th century the "e" was dropped and the second "l" and its companion "e" gave way a few years later. The town's incorporation was effective in 1874. The town began with just 42 lots along Main Street centering on the Court House and the county jail and sheriff's house. Over the years, the population grew slowly to about 200 residents by 1865. The introduction of the canning industry, the Ma & Pa railroad and related financial businesses jump started the growth after the Civil War. Although the town experienced periods of rapid growth followed by extremely slow growth over the next century, Bel Air's role as the center of government and commerce continued to expand.

Since 1980, the town and its surrounding suburbs have grown substantially. Today, Bel Air is the center for governmental, educational, cultural, medical, and commercial institutions in the county.

In the early 20th century, several fires swept through the downtown area, notably in 1900 and 1942. In 1972, another fire struck, decimating the east side of Main Street and causing $2 million in damage.

In 1970, H. Rap Brown, a member of the Black Panthers and the fourth chairman of the Student Nonviolent Coordinating Committee (SNCC), was charged with instigating a riot after a rally in Cambridge, Maryland; a change in venue brought his trial to Bel Air. Two black militants drove to Bel Air in a truck laden with plastic explosives, intending to attack the courthouse. Due to heavy security at the courthouse, the two men driving the truck fled on Route 1. The explosives subsequently detonated and killed both men. The blast left a crater in the road and blew out the windows of a nearby toll house. Brown would go on to escape the night of his trial.

Into the 1950s, the town hosted horse racing at Bel Air Racetrack, which stood where the Harford Mall is today.

The Bel Air Armory, Bel Air Courthouse Historic District, Broom's Bloom, D. H. Springhouse, Dibb House, Graham-Crocker House, Graystone Lodge, Harford Furnace Historic District, Harford National Bank, Hays House, Hays-Heighe House, Heighe House, Joshua's Meadows, Liriodendron, Mount Adams, Norris-Stirling House, Odd Fellows Lodge, Priest Neal's Mass House and Mill Site, Proctor House, Thomas Run Church, Tudor Hall, The Vineyard, and Woodview are listed on the National Register of Historic Places.

== Geography ==
According to the U.S. Census Bureau, the town has a total area of 3.03 square miles (7.85 km^{2}), of which 3.02 square miles (7.82 km^{2}) is land and 0.01 square miles (0.03 km^{2}) is water.

=== Climate ===
Bel Air lies within the humid subtropical climate zone. Bel Air features hot, often humid summers, mild, wet springs, pleasant falls and cool to chilly winters. The average precipitation for Bel Air is around 40-43 inches while snowfall averages 19–24 inches.

== Demographics ==
Historical population
Census	Pop.	Note	%±
1850	255		—
1860	197		−22.7%
1870	633		221.3%
1890	1,416		—
1900	961		−32.1%
1910	1,005		4.6%
1920	1,091		8.6%
1930	1,650		51.2%
1940	1,885		14.2%
1950	2,578		36.8%
1960	4,300		66.8%
1970	6,307		46.7%
1980	7,814		23.9%
1990	8,860		13.4%
2000	10,080		13.8%
2010	10,120		0.4%
2020	10,661		5.3%
2021 (est.)	10,715	▲	0.5%
U.S. Decennial Census

=== 2020 census ===
As of the 2020 census, Bel Air had a population of 10,661. The median age was 40.2 years. 20.1% of residents were under the age of 18 and 20.3% of residents were 65 years of age or older. For every 100 females there were 92.7 males, and for every 100 females age 18 and over there were 88.2 males age 18 and over.

100.0% of residents lived in urban areas, while 0.0% lived in rural areas.

There were 4,711 households in Bel Air, of which 27.1% had children under the age of 18 living in them. Of all households, 39.6% were married-couple households, 20.3% were households with a male householder and no spouse or partner present, and 32.4% were households with a female householder and no spouse or partner present. About 35.8% of all households were made up of individuals and 16.6% had someone living alone who was 65 years of age or older.

There were 4,921 housing units, of which 4.3% were vacant. The homeowner vacancy rate was 0.9% and the rental vacancy rate was 4.4%.

Racial composition as of the 2020 census
Race	Number	Percent
White	8,657	81.2%
Black or African American	607	5.7%
American Indian and Alaska Native	23	0.2%
Asian	317	3.0%
Native Hawaiian and Other Pacific Islander	2	0.0%
Some other race	350	3.3%
Two or more races	705	6.6%
Hispanic or Latino (of any race)	800	7.5%

=== 2010 census ===
As of the census of 2010, there were 10,120 people, 4,491 households, and 2,568 families living in the town. The population density was 3,453.9 inhabitants per square mile (1,333.6/km^{2}). There were 4,744 housing units at an average density of 1,619.1 units per square mile (625.1 units/km^{2}). The racial makeup of the town was 89.8% White, 4.4% African American, 0.2% Native American, 1.8% Asian, 0.1% Pacific Islander, 1.7% from other races, and 2.0% from two or more races. Hispanic or Latino people of any race were 4.3% of the population.

There were 4,491 households, of which 26.9% had children under the age of 18 living with them, 41.0% were married couples living together, 11.4% had a female householder with no husband present, 4.8% had a male householder with no wife present, and 42.8% were non-families. 36.3% of all households were made up of individuals, and 15.4% had someone living alone who was 65 years of age or older. The average household size was 2.20 and the average family size was 2.89.

The median age in the town was 40.3 years. 20.5% of residents were under the age of 18; 8.9% were between the ages of 18 and 24; 26.1% were from 25 to 44; 26.1% were from 45 to 64; and 18.4% were 65 years of age or older. The gender makeup of the town was 47.8% male and 52.2% female.

=== 2000 census ===
As of the census of 2000, there were 10,080 people, 4,235 households, and 2,511 families living in the town. The population density was 3,583.7 inhabitants per square mile (1,383.7/km^{2}). There were 4,444 housing units at an average density of 1,580.0 units per square mile (610.0 units/km^{2}). The racial makeup of the town was 92.82% White, 4.38% African American, 0.20% Native American, 1.41% Asian, 0.03% Pacific Islander, 0.27% from other races, and 0.90% from two or more races. Hispanic or Latino of any race were 1.22% of the population.

There were 4,235 households, out of which 28.2% had children under the age of 18 living with them, 45.2% were married couples living together, 10.4% had a female householder with no husband present, and 40.7% were non-families. 35.2% of all households were made up of individuals, and 14.8% had someone living alone who was 65 years of age or older. The average household size was 2.25 and the average family size was 2.94.

In the town the population was spread out, with 22.1% under the age of 18, 8.2% from 18 to 24, 30.5% from 25 to 44, 21.8% from 45 to 64, and 17.4% who were 65 years of age or older. The median age was 39 years. For every 100 females there were 94.0 males. For every 100 females age 18 and over, there were 91.1 males.

The median income for a household in the town was $44,135, and the median income for a family was $58,299. Males had a median income of $42,412 versus $29,207 for females. The per capita income for the town was $23,737. 6.4% of the population and 4.0% of families were below the poverty line. Out of the total people living in poverty, 7.6% are under the age of 18 and 6.5% are 65 or older.

== Infrastructure ==
=== Transportation ===
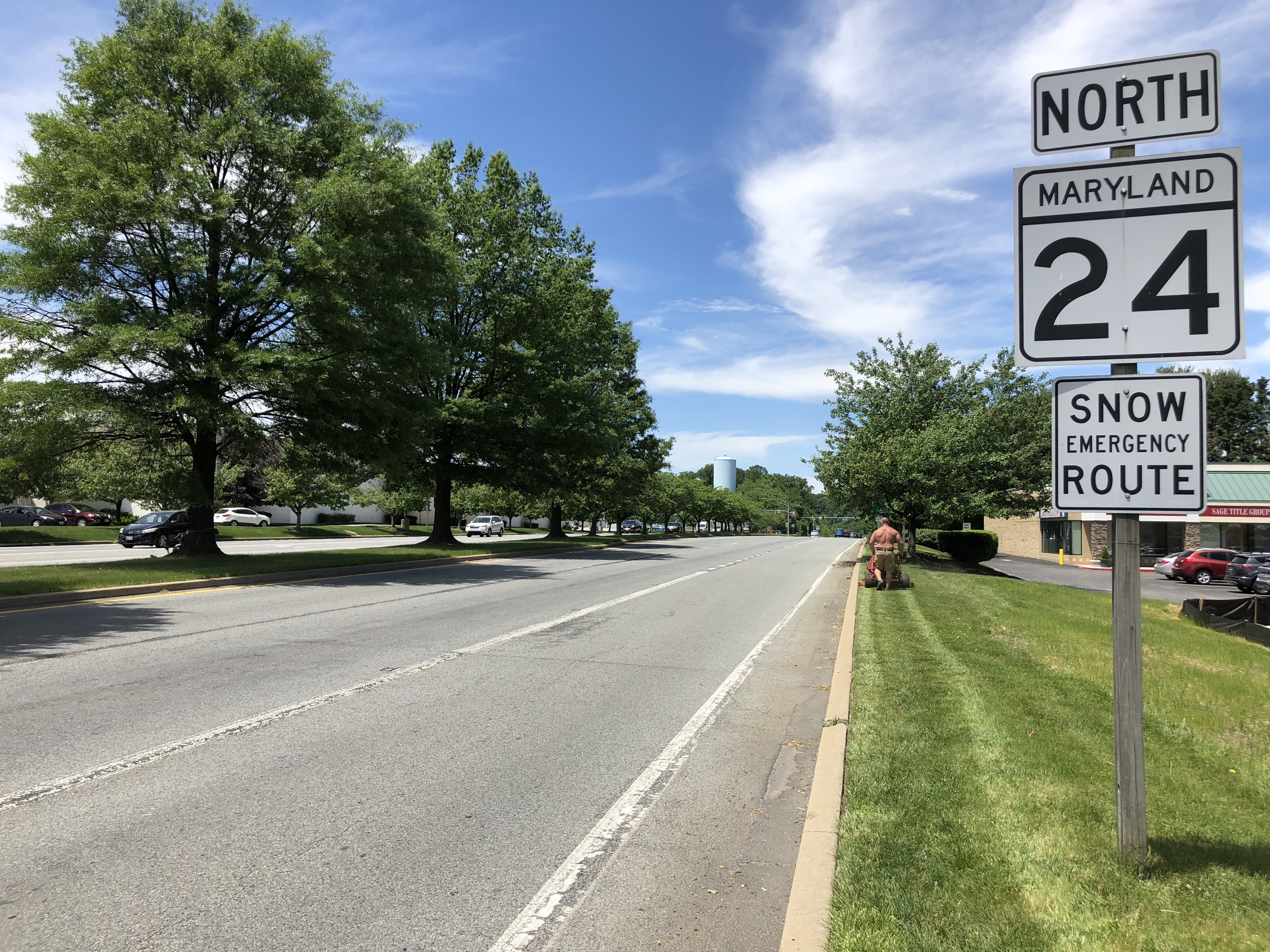
MD 24 northbound at US 1 Bus in Bel Air

==== Highways ====
The primary means of transportation to and from Bel Air is by road, and the most prominent highway serving the town is Maryland Route 24. MD 24 provides the most direct link between Bel Air and the nearest U.S. Highway, U.S. Route 1, and the nearest Interstate highway, Interstate 95. US 1 formerly ran through the town, but now follows a bypass around the northwest side, with U.S. Route 1 Business following US 1's former alignment through Bel Air. Maryland Route 924 also follows MD 24's old alignment through downtown Bel Air. Finally, Maryland Route 22 provides a direct connection between Bel Air and the city of Aberdeen. By road, Bel Air is 27 mi (43 km) northeast of Baltimore, 66 mi (106 km) northeast of Washington, D.C., 78 mi (126 km) southwest of Philadelphia and 167 mi (269 km) southwest of New York City.

==== Airports ====
The three small plane airports in the metropolitan area are:

- Forest Hill Industrial Airpark
- Fallston Airport
- Harford County Airport

==== Railroads ====
In the mid 20th century the Maryland and Pennsylvania Railroad ("Ma and Pa") ran through town, but the tracks were dismantled in 1958. The station was located (at milepost 26.5) on Rockspring Ave. between Broadway and Ellendale St. Much of the railroad's former route in and around Bel Air is now the Ma and Pa walking trail, which cuts through various wooded sections of town in and around Heavenly Waters Park.

==== Bus service ====
Harford Transit LINK is the primary means of transportation through Bel Air and to other areas of Harford County. The service operates seven routes throughout the county, including the Orange Line, or the Bel Air Circulator. Other routes include the Blue Line to Edgewood, and the Green Line to Aberdeen and Havre De Grace. The Blue Line connects to the Edgewood MARC train station, and the Green Line connects with the Aberdeen Amtrak and MARC train station. The Harford Mall serves as the major transfer hub in the town.

Nearby, the MTA operates the 410 and 411 lines, which connect into downtown Baltimore.

=== Law enforcement ===
Bel Air's primary law enforcement agency is the Bel Air Police Department which was established in 1874. Its headquarters is located at 39 N. Hickory Avenue. Overseeing the department is Charles Moore, lifelong Harford County resident and former Maryland State Police captain.

== Culture ==
Bel Air includes one of Maryland's 24 designated arts and entertainment districts. The district consists of 99 acres, which includes most of the city's downtown. It is used for concerts, art galleries, and other venues and events.

== Publications ==
The Aegis is the main daily print news publication for Bel Air and surrounding Harford County. Bel Air News and Views is a popular online community news publication started in 2006.

== Government ==
Bel Air is governed by a Council-Manager form of government. It is led by a five-member Board of Town Commissioners. The Board appoints a Town Administrator, who is responsible for the daily functions of municipal government. The chair of the Board, elected by its members each year, is given the ceremonial title of Mayor of Bel Air.

All five Bel Air Town Commissioners are Republicans, though municipal elections are officially nonpartisan.

Commissioner	Party	Term began	Term ends
Paula Etting, Chair	Republican	2021	2029
Steve Chizmar, Vice Chair	Republican	2023	2027
Jake Taylor	Republican	2023	2027
Gavin Hanley	Republican	2025	2029
Kristien Foss	Republican	2025	2027

== Education ==
Local public schools are administered by the Harford County Public Schools.

== Notable people ==
- John Archer, United States representative and physician, recipient of first medical diploma issued in United States, from what is now University of Pennsylvania School of Medicine; 1741–1810
- Lisa Aukland, professional bodybuilder and powerlifter
- Andrew Berry, professional football manager
- Austin Brinkman, NFL long snapper for the Houston Texans
- Elijah Bond, inventor of the ouija board
- Edwin Booth, brother of John Wilkes Booth and son of Junius Brutus Booth; considered one of the great Shakespearean actors of the 1800s
- John Wilkes Booth, American stage actor and assassin of President Abraham Lincoln
- Augustus Bradford, 32nd Governor of Maryland, 1862–1866
- Richard Chizmar, New York Times bestselling author, publisher and editor of Cemetery Dance magazine, and the owner of Cemetery Dance Publications
- Pat Healey, midfielder for Crystal Palace Baltimore and Baltimore Blast
- Julienne Irwin, America's Got Talent finalist, singer
- Chase Kalisz, swimmer, gold medalist at 2020 Summer Olympics
- Howard Atwood Kelly, pioneering gynecologist, one of "big four" founding staff members of Johns Hopkins University School of Medicine
- Kimmie Meissner, figure skating Olympian, 2006 World Champion and 2007 U.S. Champion
- Melvin Mora, former Baltimore Orioles player, lived in Bel Air
- Herman Stump, Congressman; U.S. Commissioner-General of Immigration under President Grover Cleveland
- Drew Westervelt, professional lacrosse player for Chesapeake Bayhawks and Colorado Mammoth
- Jay Witasick, MLB pitcher
- Brandon Scott Jones, American actor on Ghosts (CBS)
