= Hays-Heighe House =

Historic house in Maryland, United States

- U.S. National Register of Historic Places
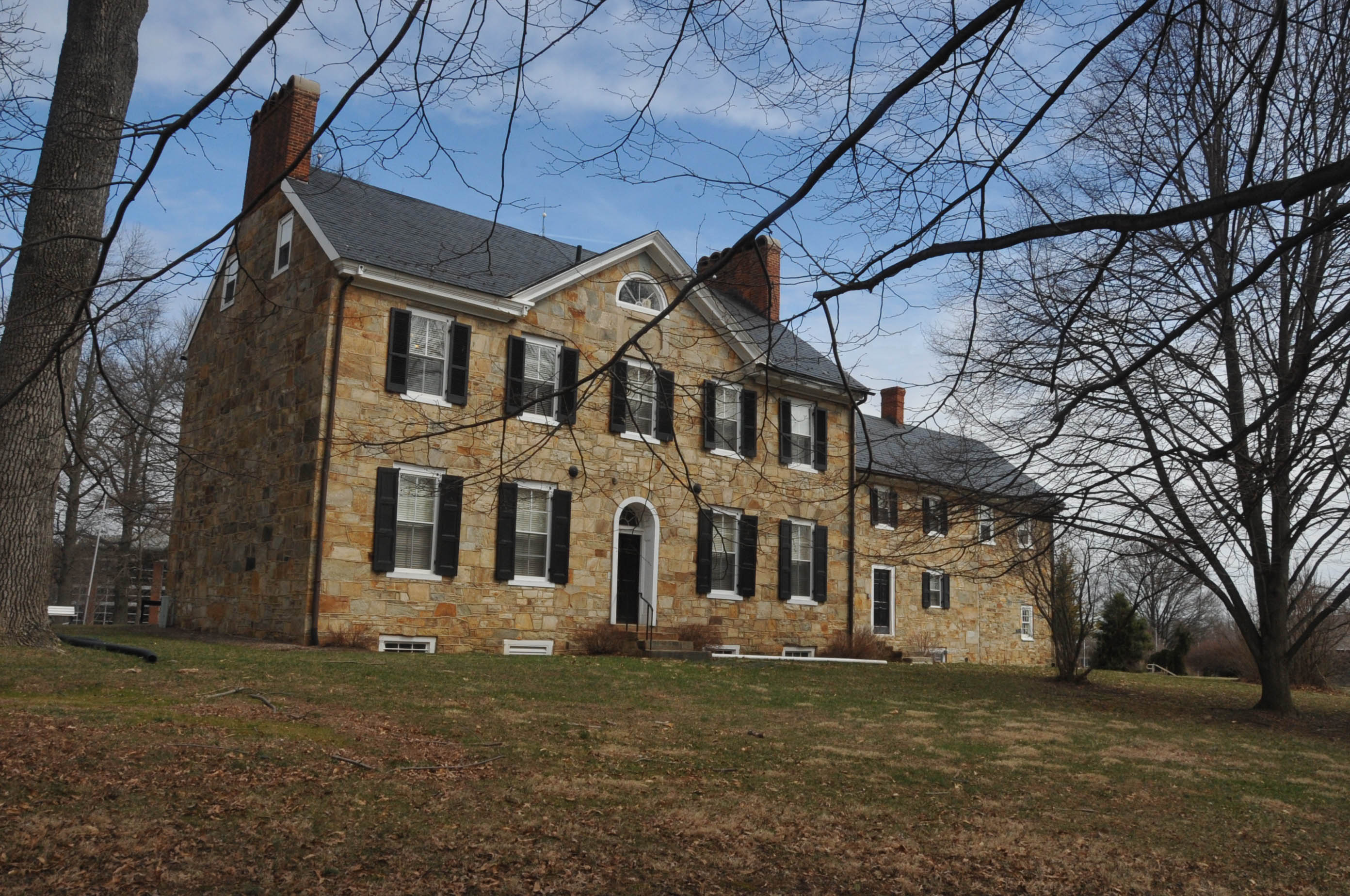
- Hays-Heighe House in 2007

- Location within Maryland Location within the United States
- Location: 401 Thomas Run Rd., Bel Air, Maryland
- Coordinates: 39°33′37″N 76°17′0″W
- Area: 1 acre (0.40 ha)
- Built: 1808
- NRHP reference No.: 72000581
- Added to NRHP: February 11, 1972

The Hays-Heighe House is a historic home located on the campus of Harford Community College near Bel Air, Harford County, Maryland, United States. It is a five bay long, two bay deep stone house with a gable roof and massive brick chimneys on each gable, built in 1808. On the east is a five bay long, two-story stone wing. Its initial owner, Thomas A. Hays, was one of the founders of the town of Bel Air.

The Hays-Heighe House was listed on the National Register of Historic Places in 1972.
