= Priest Neal's Mass House and Mill Site =

Historic church in Maryland, United States

- U.S. National Register of Historic Places
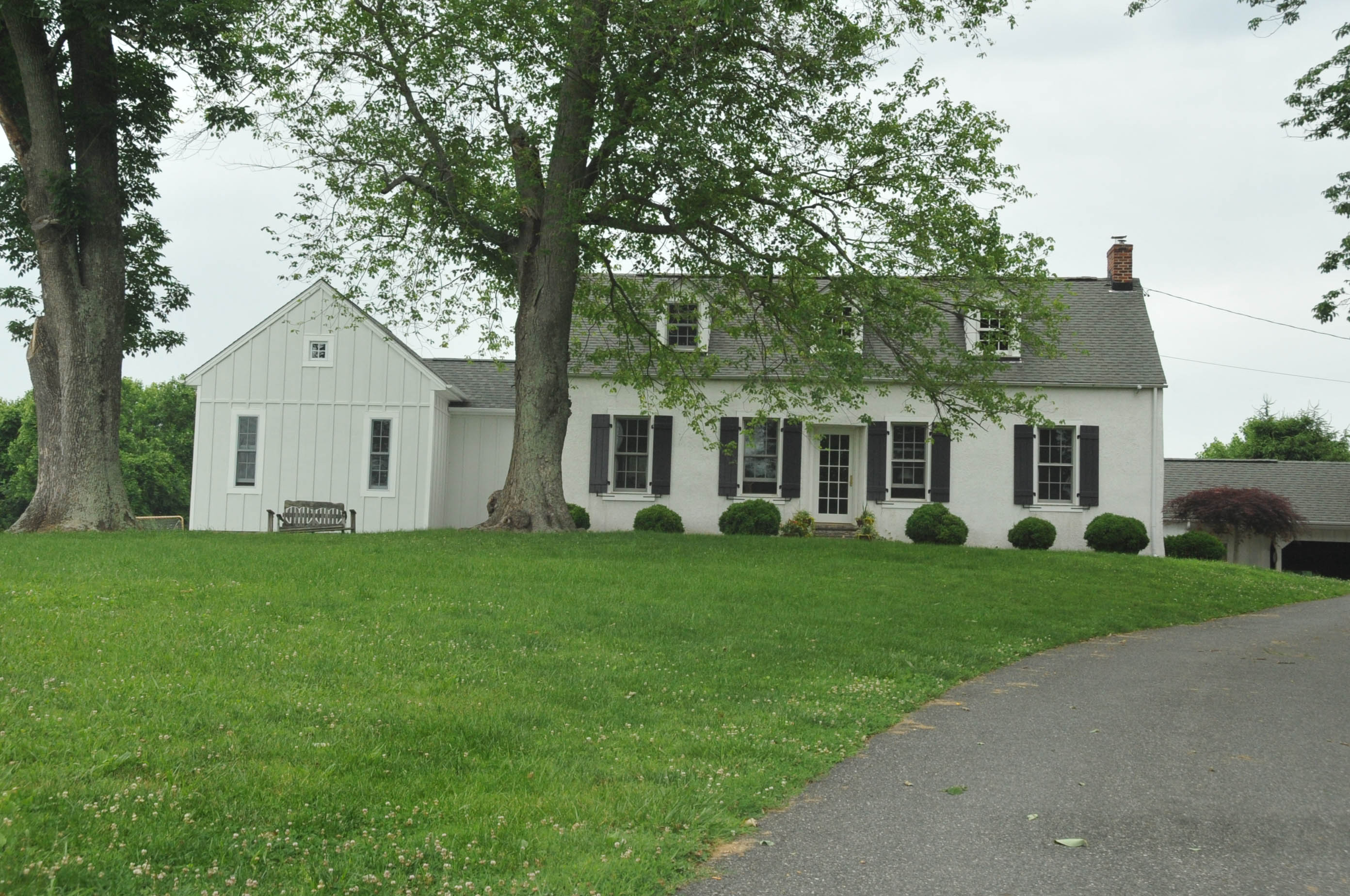
- Priest Neal's Mass House in 2007

- Location within Maryland Location within the United States
- Location: 2618 Cool Spring Road, Bel Air, Maryland
- Coordinates: 39°35′55″N 76°15′33″W
- Area: 55.8 acres (22.6 ha)
- Architectural style: Colonial
- NRHP reference No.: 90000352
- Added to NRHP: March 15, 1990

Priest Neal's Mass House and Mill Site, also known as Paradice, is a historic Roman Catholic Church located at Bel Air, Harford County, Maryland. It is a stuccoed, 1 1/2-story stone dwelling constructed about 1743 by Jesuits for use as a mission before Roman Catholics obtained freedom of worship under the United States Constitution. The interior floor plan is unique in its combined function as Jesuit priests' residence and house of worship: an unusually wide center hall provided meeting space and was flanked by two chambers on the west and a large reception room on the east. On the banks of Deer Creek, is the site of an 18th-century mill which the priests used to generate money to support their endeavors. It is one of the oldest extant buildings associated with the Catholic Church in America.

It was listed on the National Register of Historic Places in 1990.

== See also ==
- List of Jesuit sites
