= D. H. Springhouse =

- U.S. National Register of Historic Places
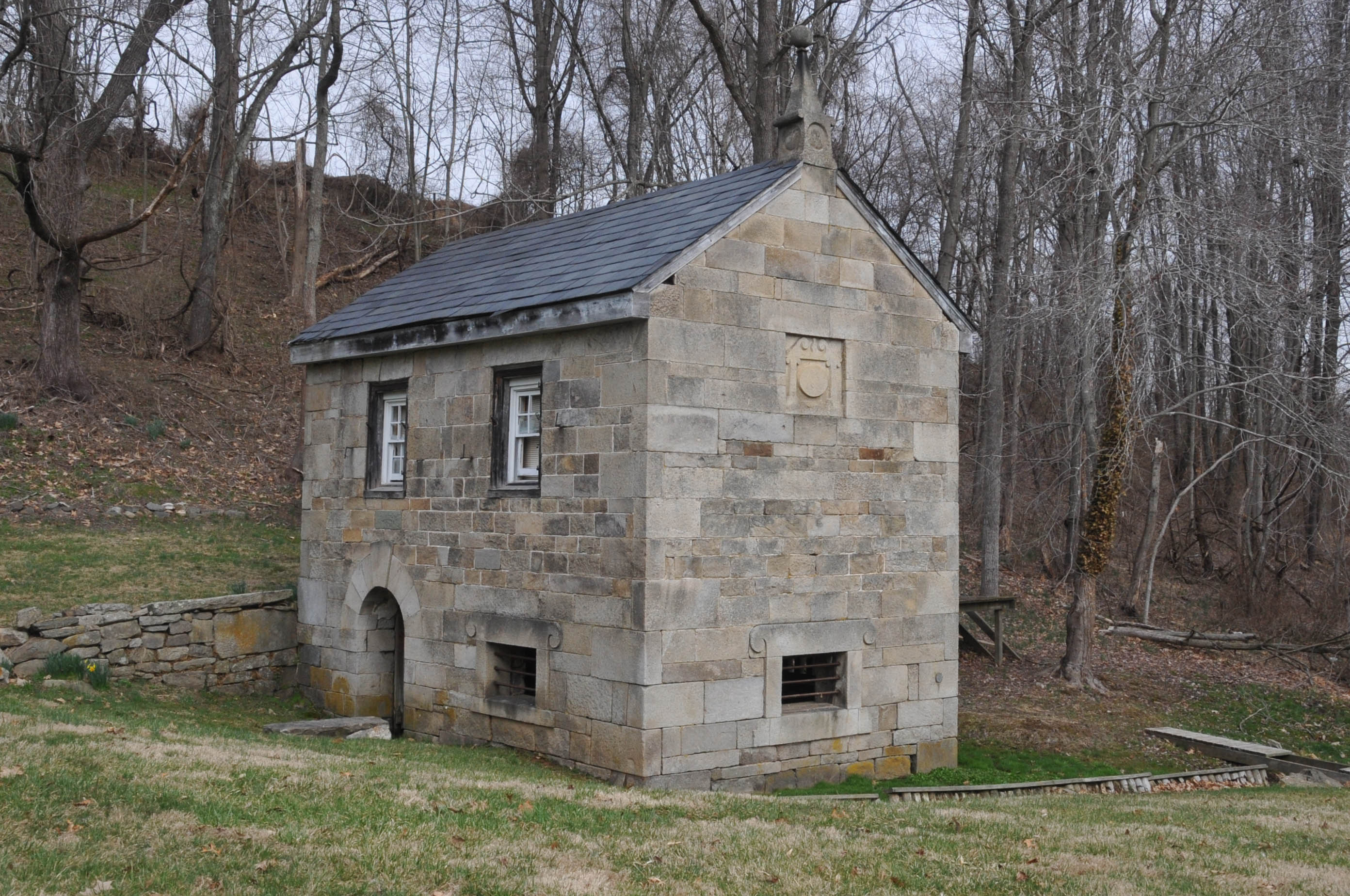

- Location within Maryland Location within the United States
- Location: About 6 miles (9.7 km) northeast of Bel Air on Sandy Hook Rd., Bel Air, Maryland
- Coordinates: 39°37′17″N 76°18′37″W
- Area: 2 acres (0.81 ha)
- Built: 1816
- NRHP reference No.: 73000923
- Added to NRHP: May 8, 1973

D. H. Springhouse is a historic springhouse located at Bel Air, Harford County, Maryland. It is a little gray stone building set into the base of a steep hill. This is a stone springhouse with a schoolroom above, 16.5 feet by 23 feet, with one narrow wall set into the bank over several fresh springs. It was built about 1816, and the quality of stonemasonry is notable.

It was listed on the National Register of Historic Places in 1973.
