= Broom's Bloom =

Historic house in Maryland, United States

- U.S. National Register of Historic Places
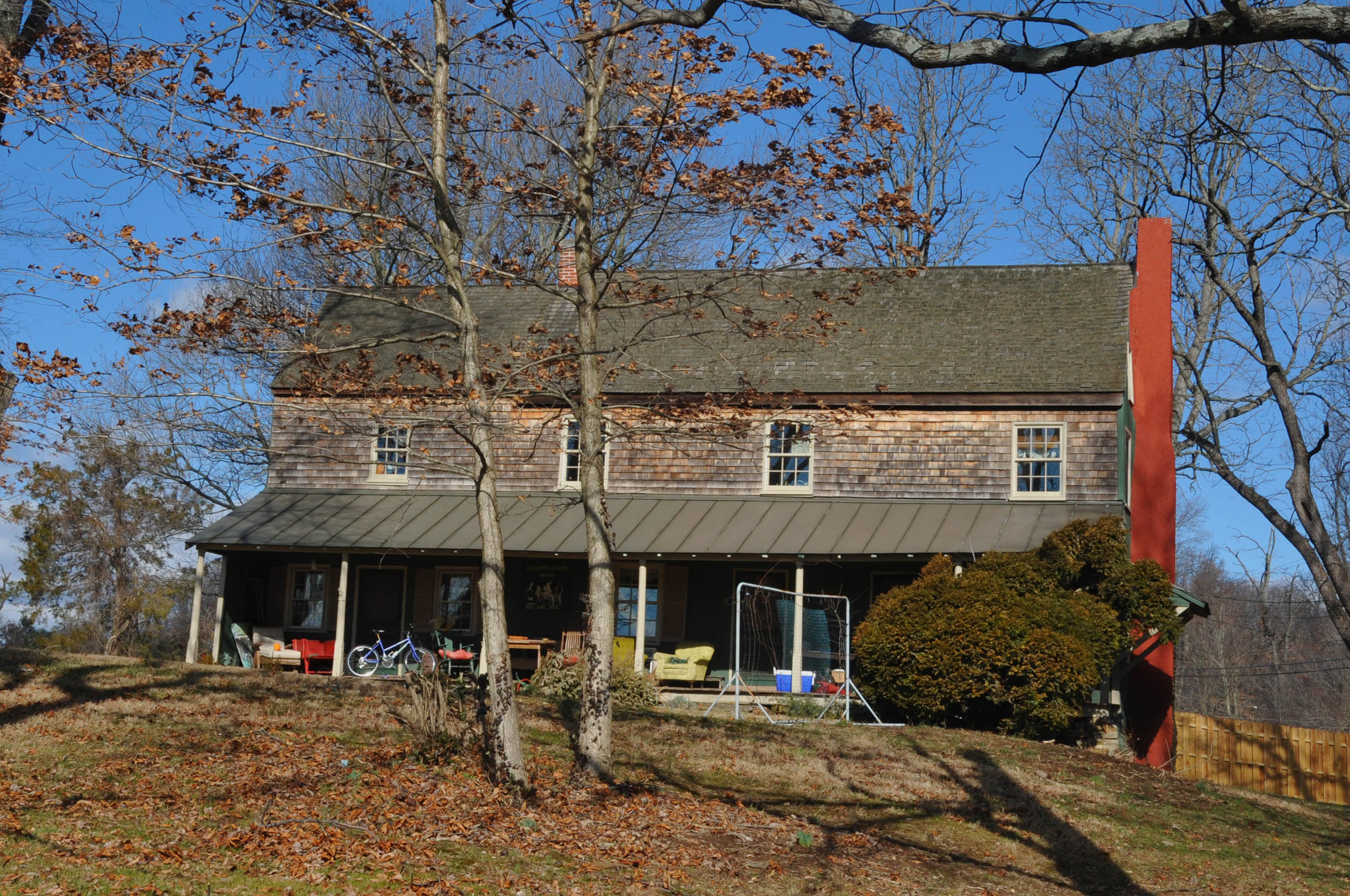
- Broom's Bloom in 2013

- Location within Maryland Location within the United States
- Location: 1616 Fountain Green Road (MD 543), Bel Air, Maryland
- Coordinates: 39°30′44″N 76°17′1″W
- Area: 120 acres (49 ha)
- Built: 1747
- Architectural style: Federal
- NRHP reference No.: 91001778
- Added to NRHP: December 19, 1991

Broom's Bloom is a historic home located in Bel Air, Harford County, Maryland, United States. It is a two-story, frame and rubblestone, gable-roofed house, partially stuccoed and partially shingled. It took its present form from four distinct and discernible periods of growth, from about 1747 to about 1950. The oldest section is four bays by two, and has a hall and parlor plan, measuring approximately 36 by 20 feet (11.0 by 6.1 m). Also on the property is a one-story, rubblestone 18th-century springhouse and a small family cemetery, which contains the earliest known gravestones in the county.

Broom's Bloom was listed on the National Register of Historic Places in 1991.
