= Harford Furnace Historic District =

Historic district in Maryland, United States

- U.S. National Register of Historic Places
- U.S. Historic district
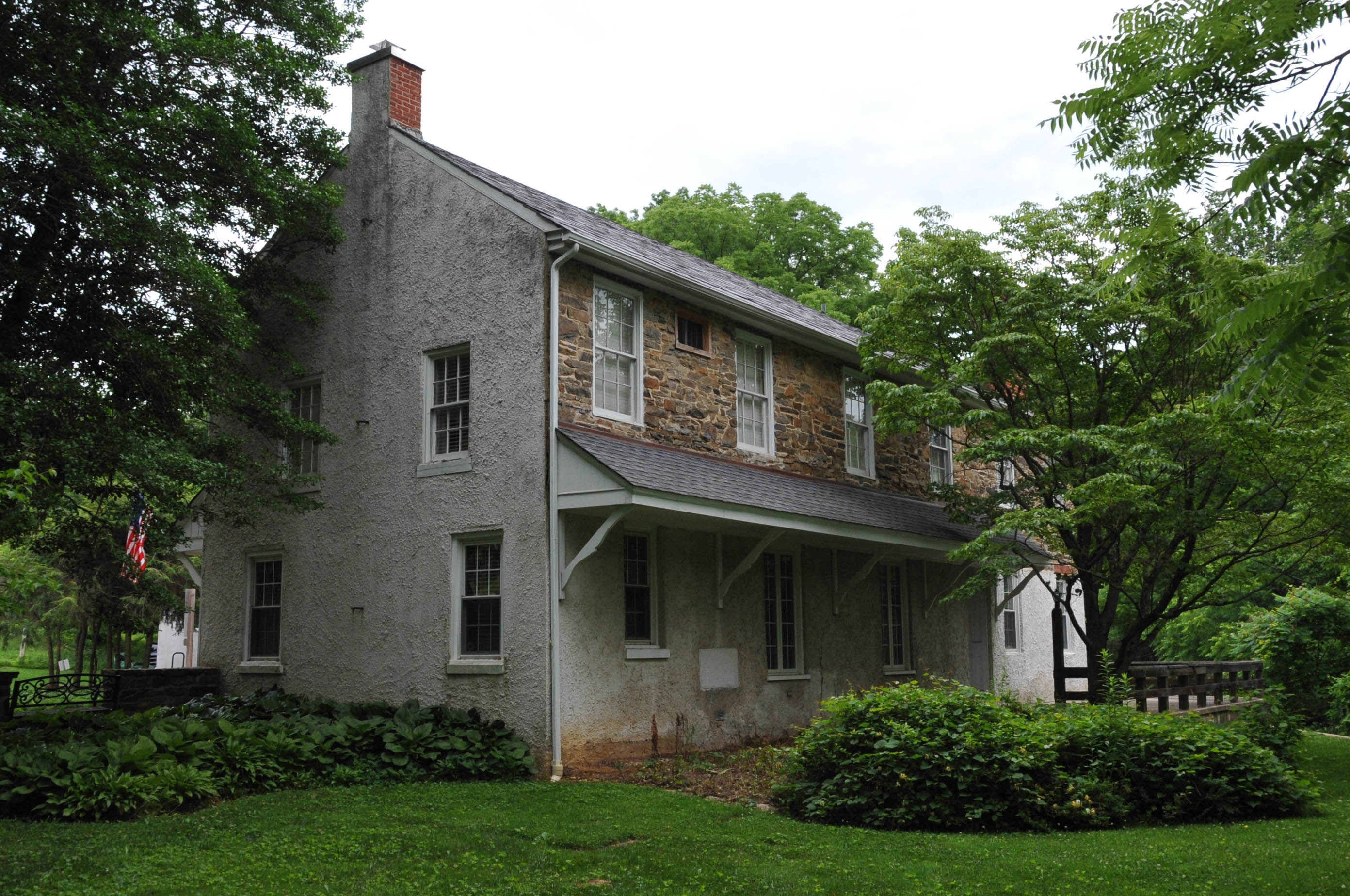
- Harford Furnace Historic District in 2007

- Location within Maryland Location within the United States
- Location: Creswell and Goat Hill Rds., Bel Air, Maryland
- Coordinates: 39°29′36″N 76°15′38″W
- Area: 32 acres (13 ha)
- Architectural style: Colonial
- NRHP reference No.: 90001020
- Added to NRHP: July 18, 1990

Harford Furnace Historic District is a national historic district at Bel Air, Harford County, Maryland, United States. It consists of five standing structures and several archeological sites associated with the operation of the iron furnace which began about 1830 and continued to function until 1876. They cover approximately 30 acres (120,000 m^{2}) of rolling land. The district side is both open and wooded and includes land on both sides of James Run, a small south-flowing tributary of the Bush River.

It was added to the National Register of Historic Places in 1990.
