= Woodview =

Historic house in Maryland, United States

- U.S. National Register of Historic Places
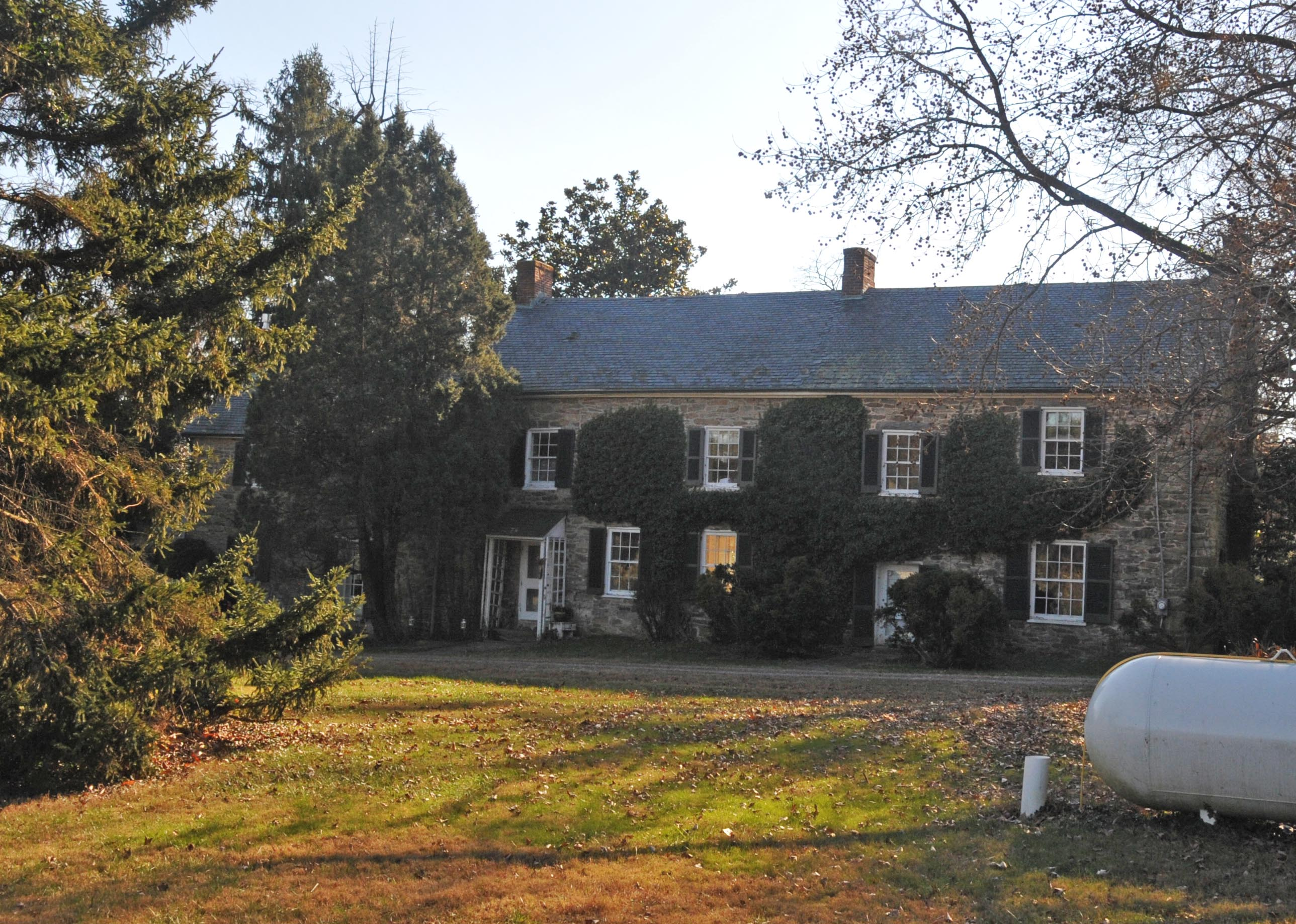
- Woodview in 2007

- Location within Maryland Location within the United States
- Location: 1326 Somerville Road, Bel Air, Maryland
- Coordinates: 39°29′47″N 76°20′56″W
- Area: 37.9 acres (15.3 ha)
- Built: 1744
- Architectural style: Federal
- NRHP reference No.: 90001574
- Added to NRHP: October 25, 1990

Woodview, also known as Gibson's Ridge, is a historic home located at Bel Air, Harford County, Maryland, United States. It is a two-section, 2 1/2-story Federal style stone house. The main section consists of two parts: a three-bay-wide two-room plan section dating to 1744 and a two-bay-wide section containing a stair hall and one large room per floor dating to about 1820. The second section is a small-scale, 2 1/2-story stone wing dating to the 18th century. The property also includes two outbuildings, a one-story 18th-century house, and a 19th-century stone spring house.

Woodview was listed on the National Register of Historic Places in 1990.
