= Norris-Stirling House =

Historic house in Maryland, United States

- U.S. National Register of Historic Places
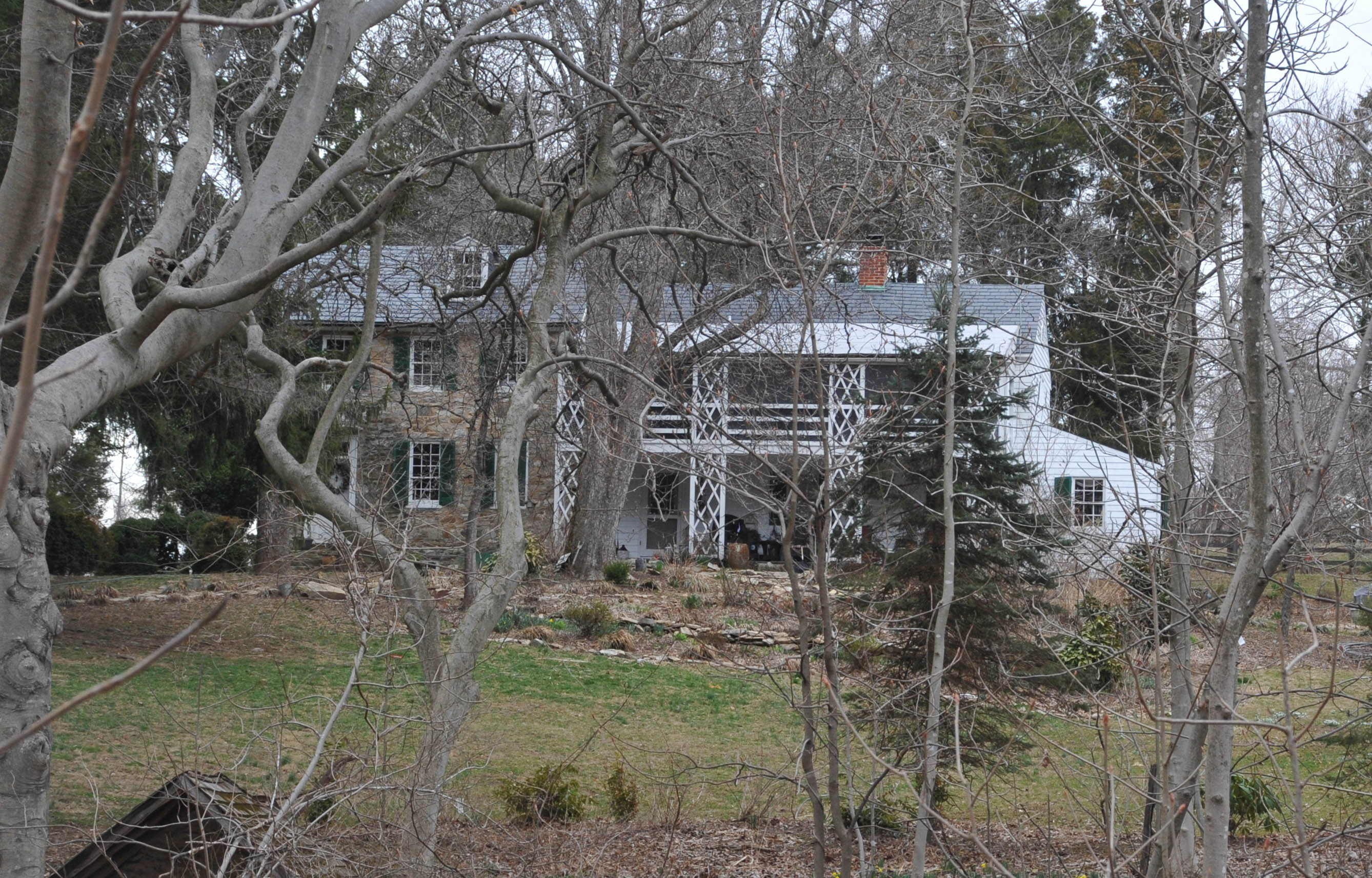

- Location within Maryland Location within the United States
- Location: 903 Ring Factory Road, Bel Air, Maryland
- Coordinates: 39°29′26″N 76°21′31″W
- Area: 14 acres (5.7 ha)
- Built: 1803
- NRHP reference No.: 79001135
- Added to NRHP: May 30, 1979

Norris-Stirling House, also known as Mt. Pleasant, is a historic home located at Bel Air, Harford County, Maryland. It is composed of an early 19th-century fieldstone section and two later frame additions. In 1936, a lean-to addition and double-tiered porch were added. The property also includes a large frame bank barn and corncrib, a stone springhouse, and a garage.

It was listed on the National Register of Historic Places in 1979.
