= Dibb House =

Historic house in Maryland, United States

- U.S. National Register of Historic Places
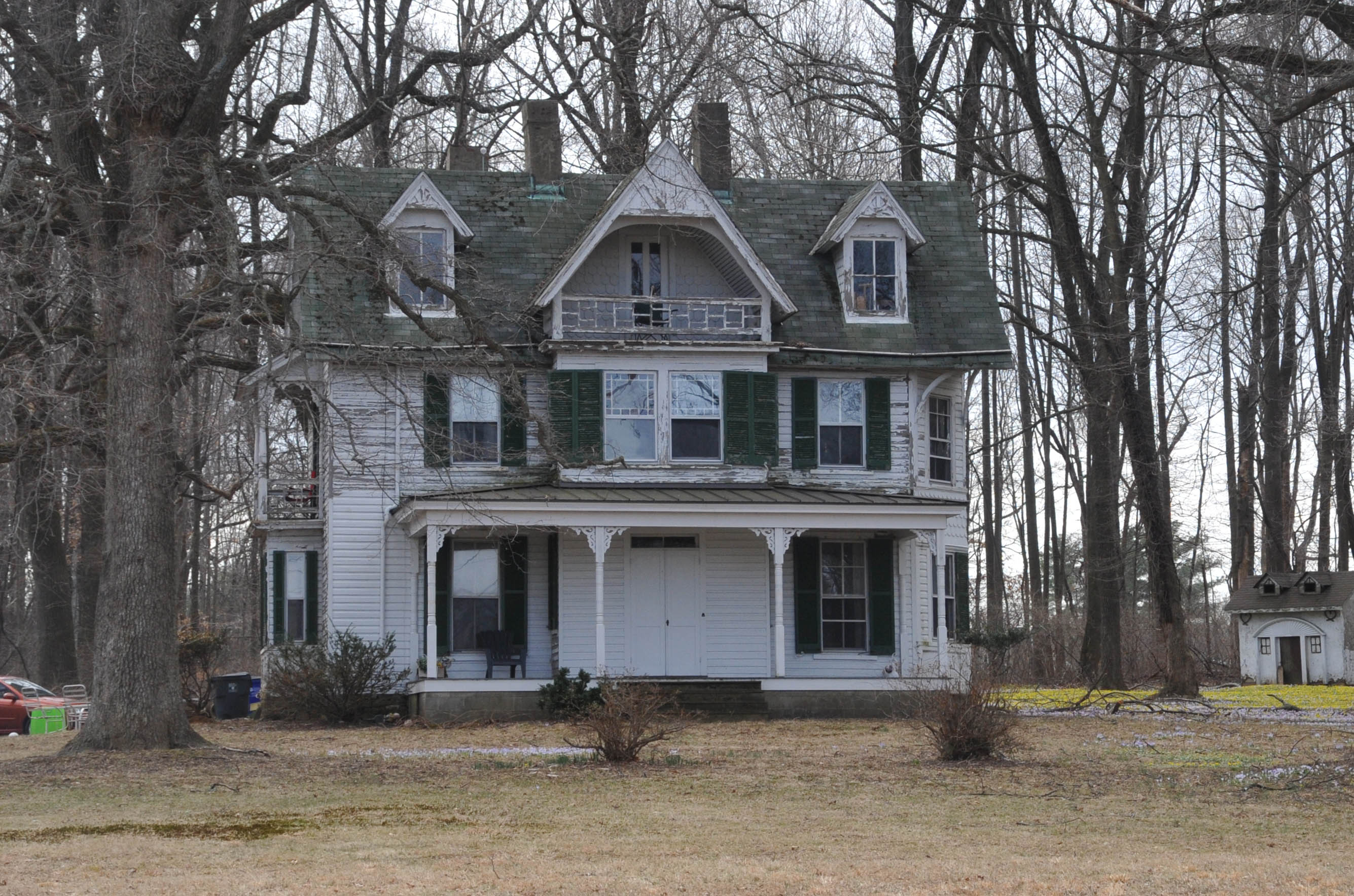
- Dibb House in 2007

- Location within Maryland Location within the United States
- Location: 1737 Churchville Road (MD 22), Bel Air, Maryland
- Coordinates: 39°32′56″N 76°18′11″W
- Area: 9 acres (3.6 ha)
- Built: 1897
- Architectural style: Late Victorian
- NRHP reference No.: 80001812
- Added to NRHP: March 18, 1980

The Dibb House is a historic home located at Bel Air, Harford County, Maryland, United States. It is a 2 1/2-story frame house with a gable roof and a central projecting bay with cross gable. In Victorian style, it features a myriad of porches, oriels, and bay and dormer windows. Also on the property are a shed, a barn, and an outhouse.

The Dibb House was listed on the National Register of Historic Places in 1980.
