= Heighe House =

Historic house in Maryland, United States

- U.S. National Register of Historic Places
- U.S. Historic district
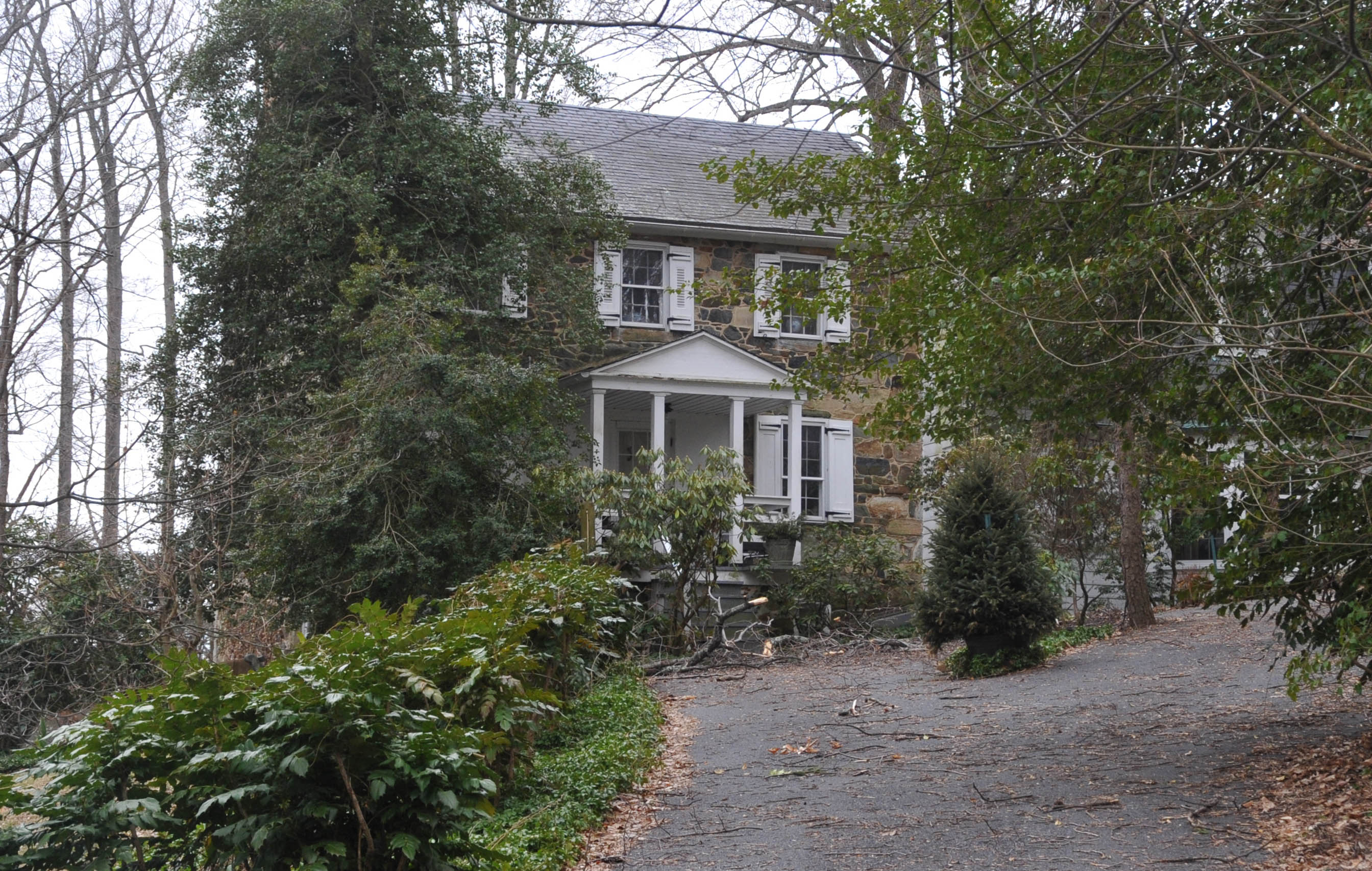
- Heighe House in 2007

- Location within Maryland Location within the United States
- Location: Junction of Southampton and Moores Mill Rds., Bel Air, Maryland
- Coordinates: 39°33′0″N 76°20′17″W
- Area: 16.5 acres (6.7 ha)
- Built: 1929
- Architect: Donn, John M.
- Architectural style: Colonial Revival
- NRHP reference No.: 90001568
- Added to NRHP: November 1, 1990

Heighe House is a historic home complex and national historic district at Bel Air, Harford County, Maryland, United States. The complex consists of a Colonial Revival, 2 1/2-story stone main house built on and incorporating the stone foundations of the Moores Mill, built in 1745; a 1 1/2-story frame chauffeur's cottage; garage; and a 1 1/2-story stone and frame guest house. They are all located on a steeply sloping 17-acre (69,000 m^{2}) site along Bynum Run. The property was developed in 1928 as a country estate for Anne McElderry Heighe (d. 1953), a woman widely regarded as the "first lady of Maryland racing."

It was added to the National Register of Historic Places in 1990.
