= Hays House (Bel Air, Maryland) =

Historic house in Maryland, United States

- U.S. National Register of Historic Places
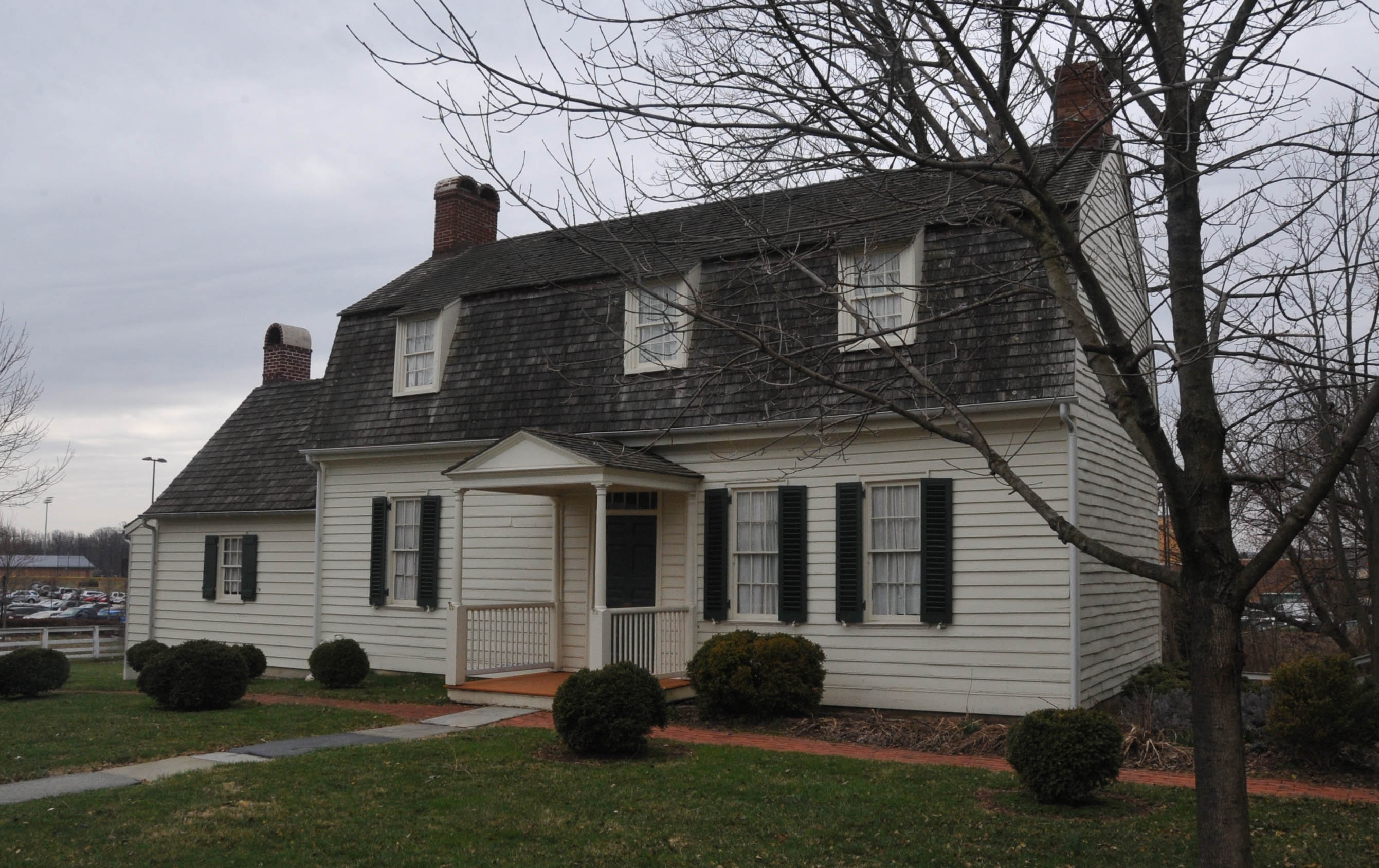
- Hays House in 2007

- Location within Maryland Location within the United States
- Location: 324 S. Kenmore Ave., Bel Air, Maryland
- Coordinates: 39°31′57″N 76°20′52″W
- Area: 0.1 acres (0.040 ha)
- Built: 1788
- NRHP reference No.: 80001815
- Added to NRHP: January 3, 1980

The Hays House is a historic home located at 324 South Kenmore Avenue, Bel Air, Harford County, Maryland, United States. It is a frame 1 1/2-story house with a gambrel roof, likely built in 1788 with an addition in 1811. The house was moved in 1960, and stands on a modern concrete-block foundation. The Hays House is owned by The Historical Society of Harford County and today the Hays House Museum offers visitors a glimpse into the life of an affluent family in late 18th century Bel Air.

The Hays House was listed on the National Register of Historic Places in 1980.
