= The Vineyard (Bel Air, Maryland) =

Historic house in Maryland, United States

- U.S. National Register of Historic Places
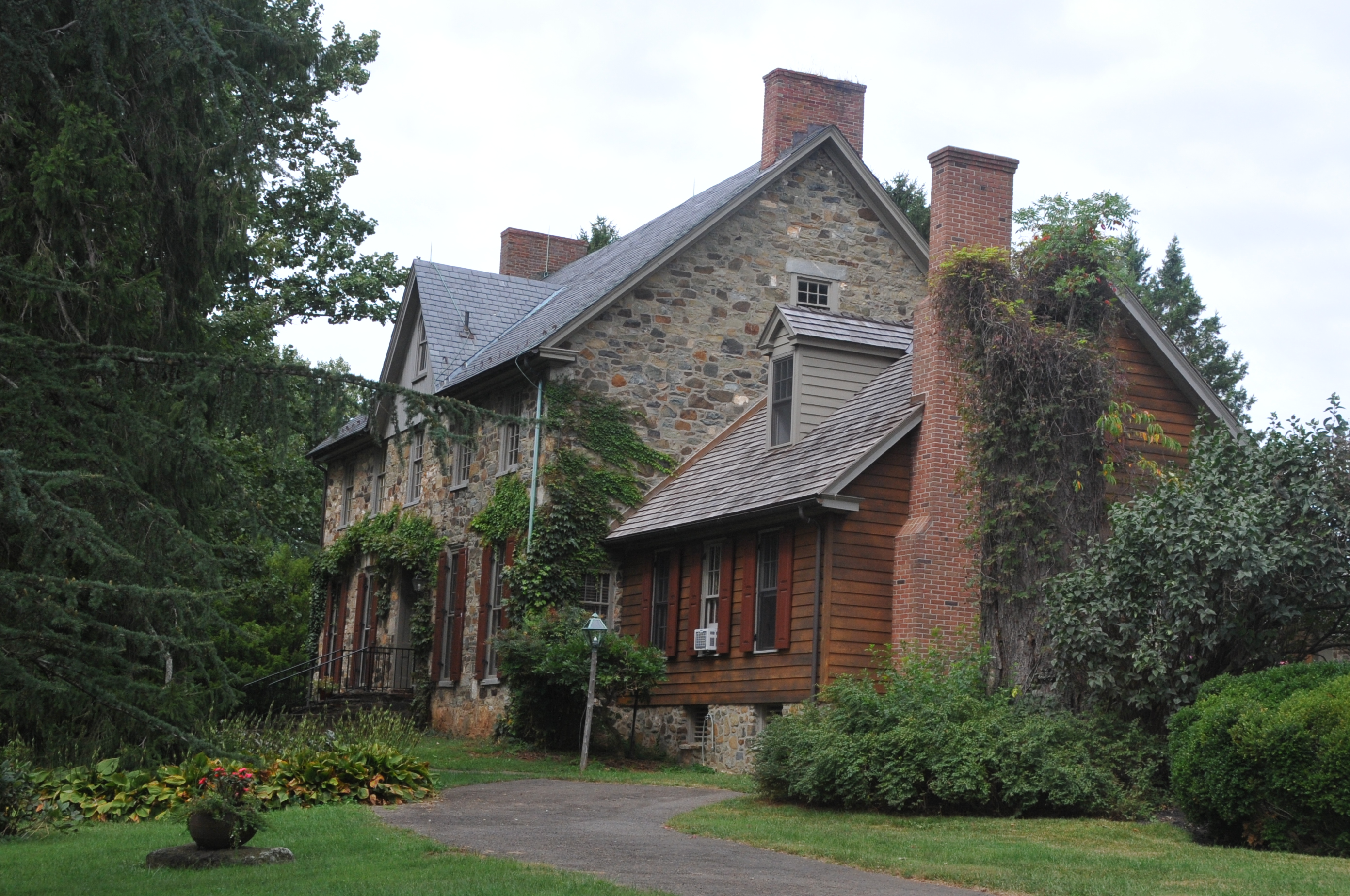
- The Vineyard in 2007

- Location within Maryland Location within the United States
- Location: 1200 Conowingo Road (US 1 Bus.), Bel Air, Maryland
- Coordinates: 39°33′56″N 76°20′34″W
- Area: 310 acres (130 ha)
- Built: 1804
- Architectural style: Federal, Late Victorian
- NRHP reference No.: 94000762
- Added to NRHP: July 22, 1994

The Vineyard is a historic home and farm complex located at Bel Air, Harford County, Maryland, United States. It consists of a cluster of buildings on a knoll in the center of a 310-acre (130 ha) working grain and livestock farm. The main house is a large stone structure, the oldest section of which comprises a two-story side stairhall / double parlor dwelling built about 1804. Two bays were added to the old house around 1870. Historically significant outbuildings, include two structures (a dairy/smokehouse, and an ice house.

The Vineyard was listed on the National Register of Historic Places in 1994.
