= Graystone Lodge =

Historic house in Maryland, United States

- U.S. National Register of Historic Places
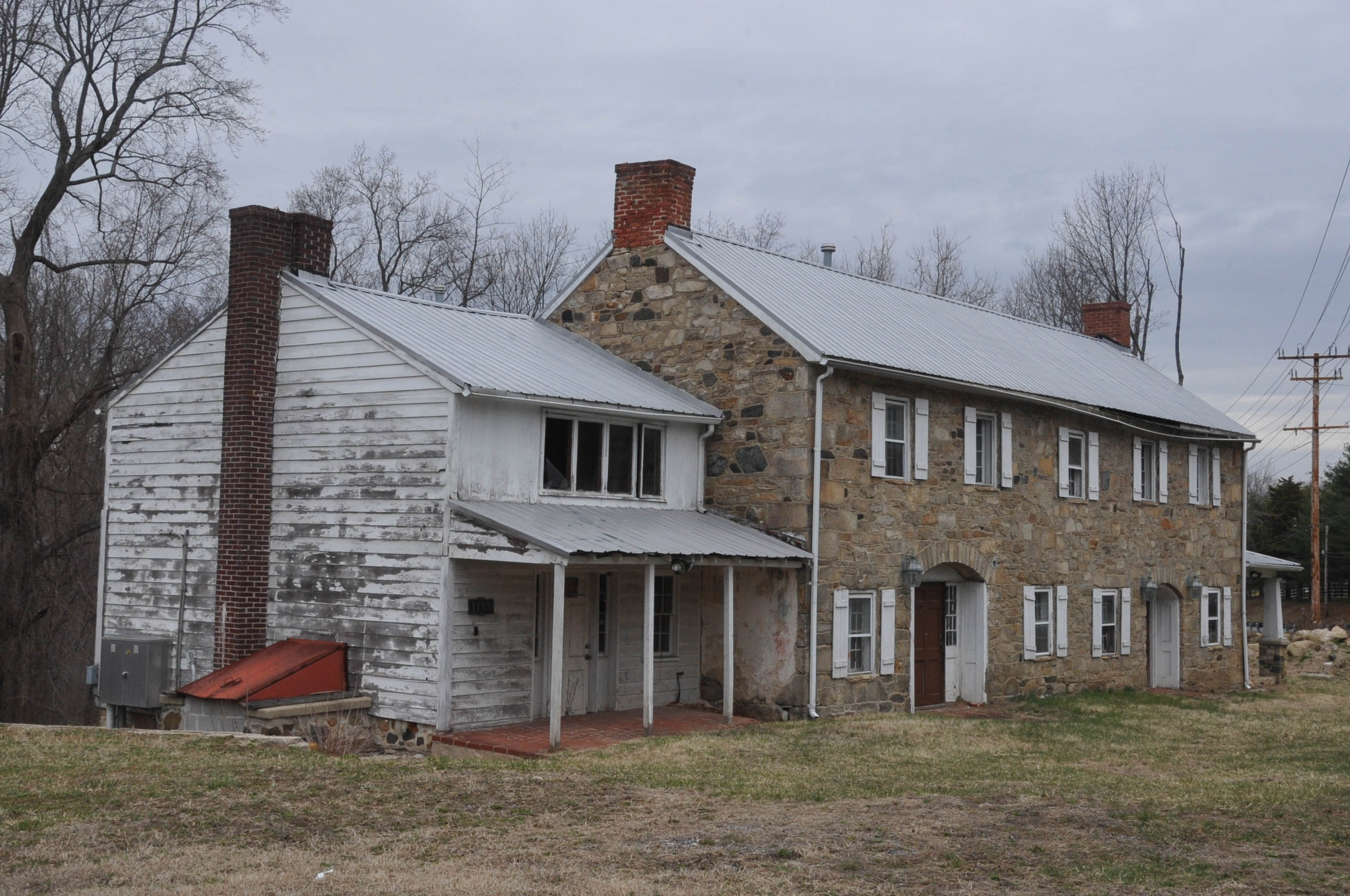
- Graystone Lodge in 2007

- Location within Maryland Location within the United States
- Location: 1118 Baltimore Pike (BUS 1), Bel Air, Maryland
- Coordinates: 39°30′44″N 76°22′24″W
- Area: 0.6 acres (0.24 ha)
- Built: 1781
- NRHP reference No.: 07000858
- Added to NRHP: August 30, 2007

The Graystone Lodge, also known as Hoskins-Guidice House, is a historic structure located at Bel Air, Harford County, Maryland, United States. It is a two-story stone building built about 1781, with a mid-19th-century frame addition. The house is a representative example of a pre-Civil War coachbuilder's shop, which embodies the distinctive characteristics of high-quality Quaker craftsmanship in its stone structure.

The Graystone Lodge was listed on the National Register of Historic Places on August 30, 2007.
