= Odd Fellows Lodge (Bel Air, Maryland) =

Historic building in Maryland, US

- U.S. National Register of Historic Places
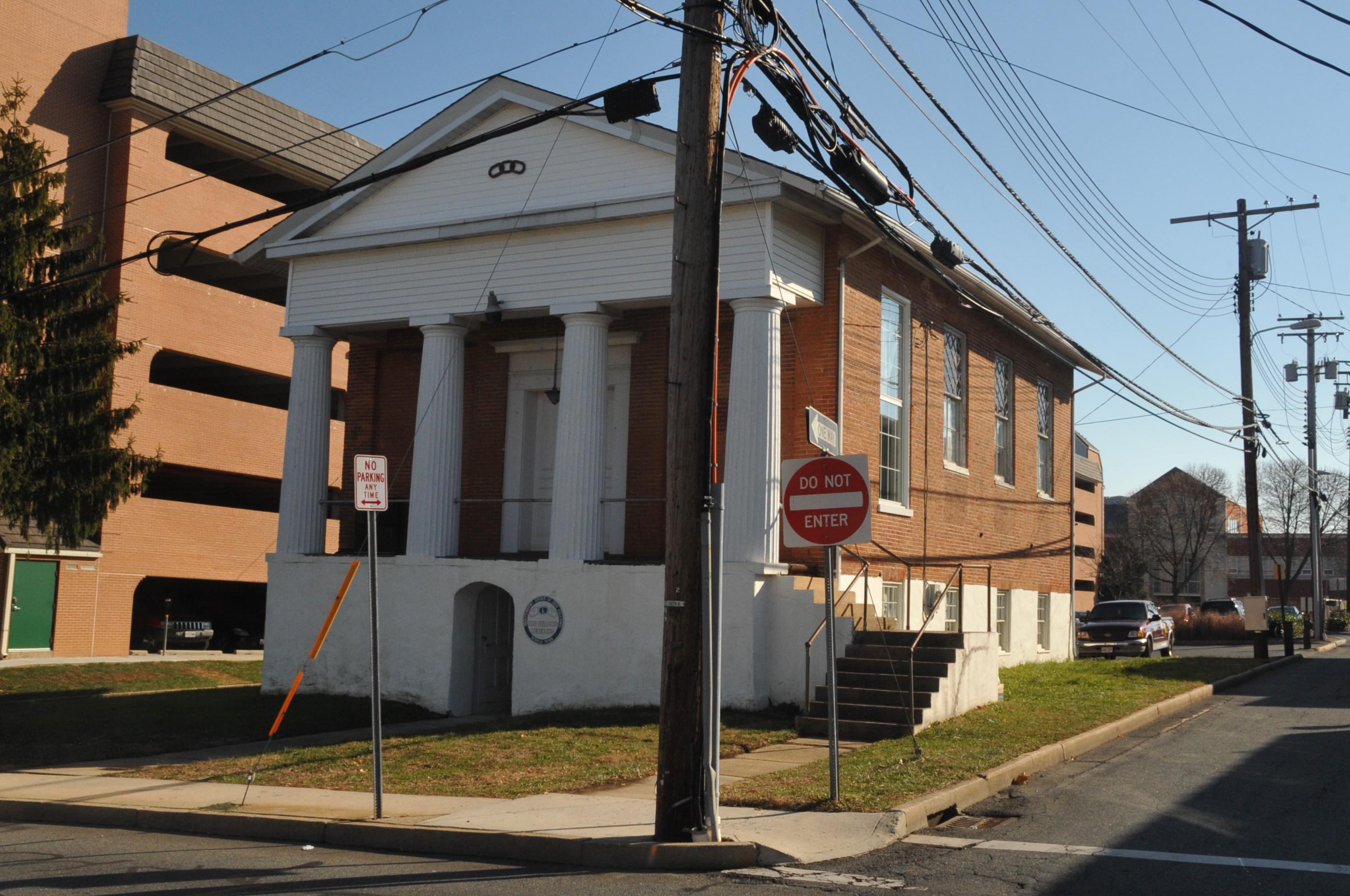
- Odd Fellows Lodge in 2007

- Location within Maryland Location within the United States
- Location: 21 Pennsylvania Ave., Bel Air, Maryland
- Coordinates: 39°32′13″N 76°20′56″W
- Area: 0.2 acres (0.081 ha)
- Built: 1852
- Architectural style: Greek Revival
- NRHP reference No.: 75000901
- Added to NRHP: August 22, 1975

Odd Fellows Lodge, also known as Old First Presbyterian Church, is a historic building in Bel Air, Maryland, United States. It was built in 1852, and is a one-story, temple-form, Greek Revival-style brick building above a high basement. The front facade features a projecting portico supported by four Doric order columns. It was originally built for the First Presbyterian Church, who moved to a new church in 1881 and leased it to the Odd Fellows Lodge.

It was listed on the National Register of Historic Places in 1975.
