= Bel Air Armory =

- U.S. National Register of Historic Places
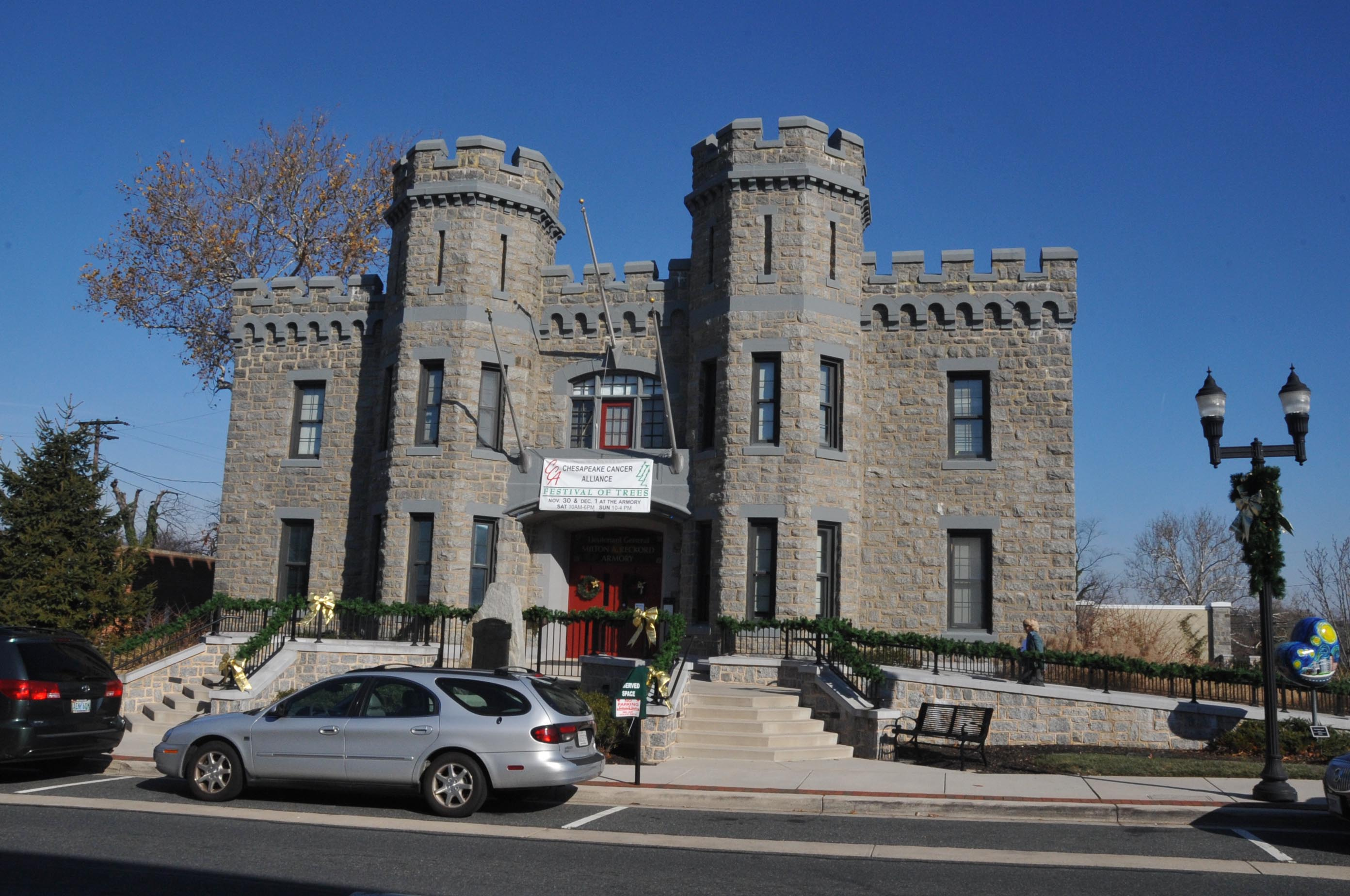
- Bel Air Armory in 2007

- Location within Maryland Location within the United States
- Location: N. Main St., Bel Air, Maryland
- Coordinates: 39°32′15″N 76°21′1″W
- Area: 0.5 acres (0.20 ha)
- Built: 1915
- Architect: Hamme, John B.; Whalen, Lawrence,& Co.
- Architectural style: Medieval Castle
- MPS: Maryland National Guard Armories TR
- NRHP reference No.: 85002667
- Added to NRHP: September 25, 1985

Bel Air Armory is a historic National Guard armory located at Bel Air, Harford County, Maryland. It was constructed in 1915 of Port Deposit granite. The building consists of the main block, five bays by three, two stories over a raised basement, and the "drill hall" to the rear of the main block. The front elevation is detailed to recall Medieval fortifications and features two projecting hexagonal towers which rise to three stories and are topped by crenelated battlements finished in stone coping.

It was listed on the National Register of Historic Places in 1985.
