= Proctor House (Bel Air, Maryland) =

Historic house in Maryland, United States

- U.S. National Register of Historic Places
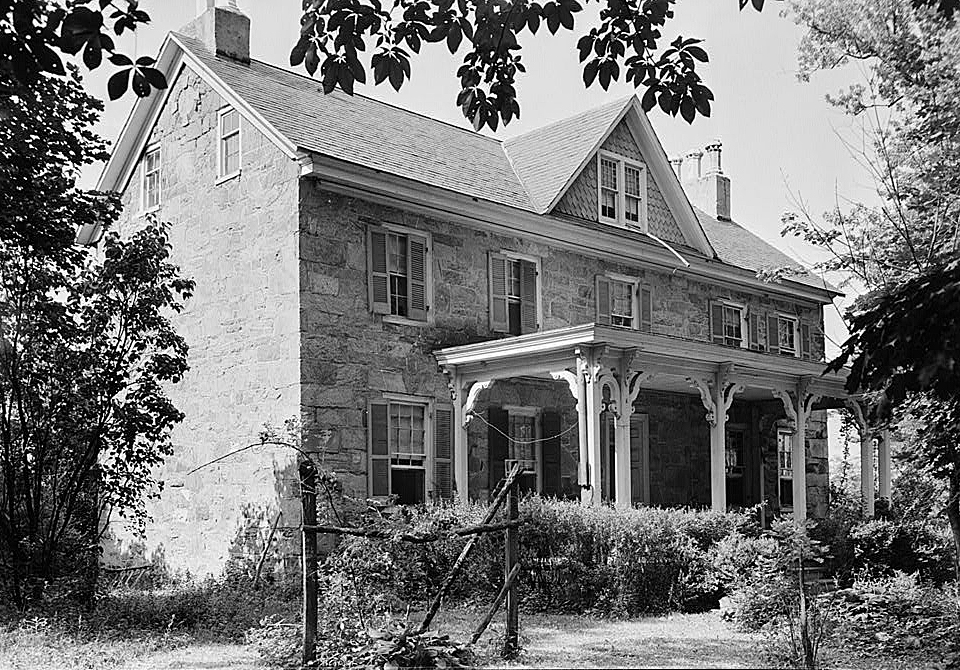
- Proctor House in 1936

- Location within Maryland Location within the United States
- Location: 54 E. Gordon St., Bel Air, Maryland
- Coordinates: 39°32′24″N 76°21′6″W
- Area: 0.5 acres (0.20 ha)
- Built: 1884
- Architectural style: Gothic Revival
- NRHP reference No.: 90000376
- Added to NRHP: March 23, 1990

Proctor House, also known as the Cassandra Gilbert House, is an historic home located at Bel Air, Harford County, Maryland, United States. It is a two-story detached Carpenter Gothic style cottage with board and batten siding, constructed between 1860 and 1873 and enlarged about 1884. The interior features an arched slate mantel painted to resemble several colors of inlaid marble.

Proctor House was listed on the National Register of Historic Places in 1990.
