= Bel Air Courthouse Historic District =

Historic district in Maryland, US

- U.S. National Register of Historic Places
- U.S. Historic district
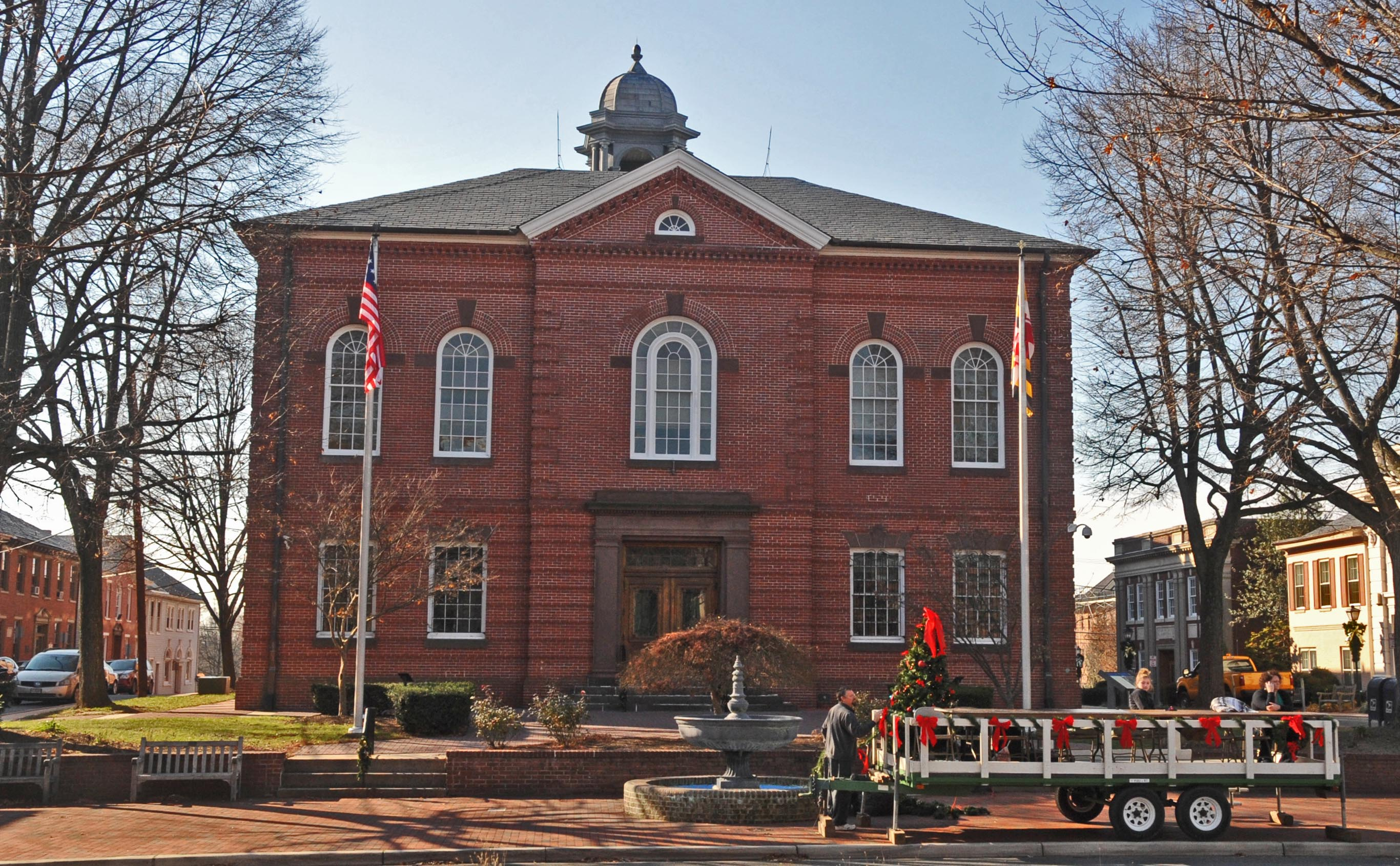
- Bel Air Courthouse in 2007

- Location within Maryland Location within the United States
- Location: Office, Courtland and Main Sts., Bel Air, Maryland
- Coordinates: 39°32′8″N 76°20′59″W
- Area: 4 acres (1.6 ha)
- Built: 1858
- Architect: Multiple
- Architectural style: Late 19th And 20th Century Revivals, Late Victorian, Greek Revival
- NRHP reference No.: 85001617
- Added to NRHP: July 25, 1985

Bel Air Courthouse Historic District is a national historic district at Bel Air, Harford County, Maryland, US. It consists of a small cohesive group of buildings, mostly two or three stories of brick or frame construction that were erected or renovated in the 19th to early 20th century period. It borders the Harford County Courthouse which is a grand scale brick structure.

It was added to the National Register of Historic Places in 1985.
