= Graham-Crocker House =

Historic house in Maryland, United States

- U.S. National Register of Historic Places
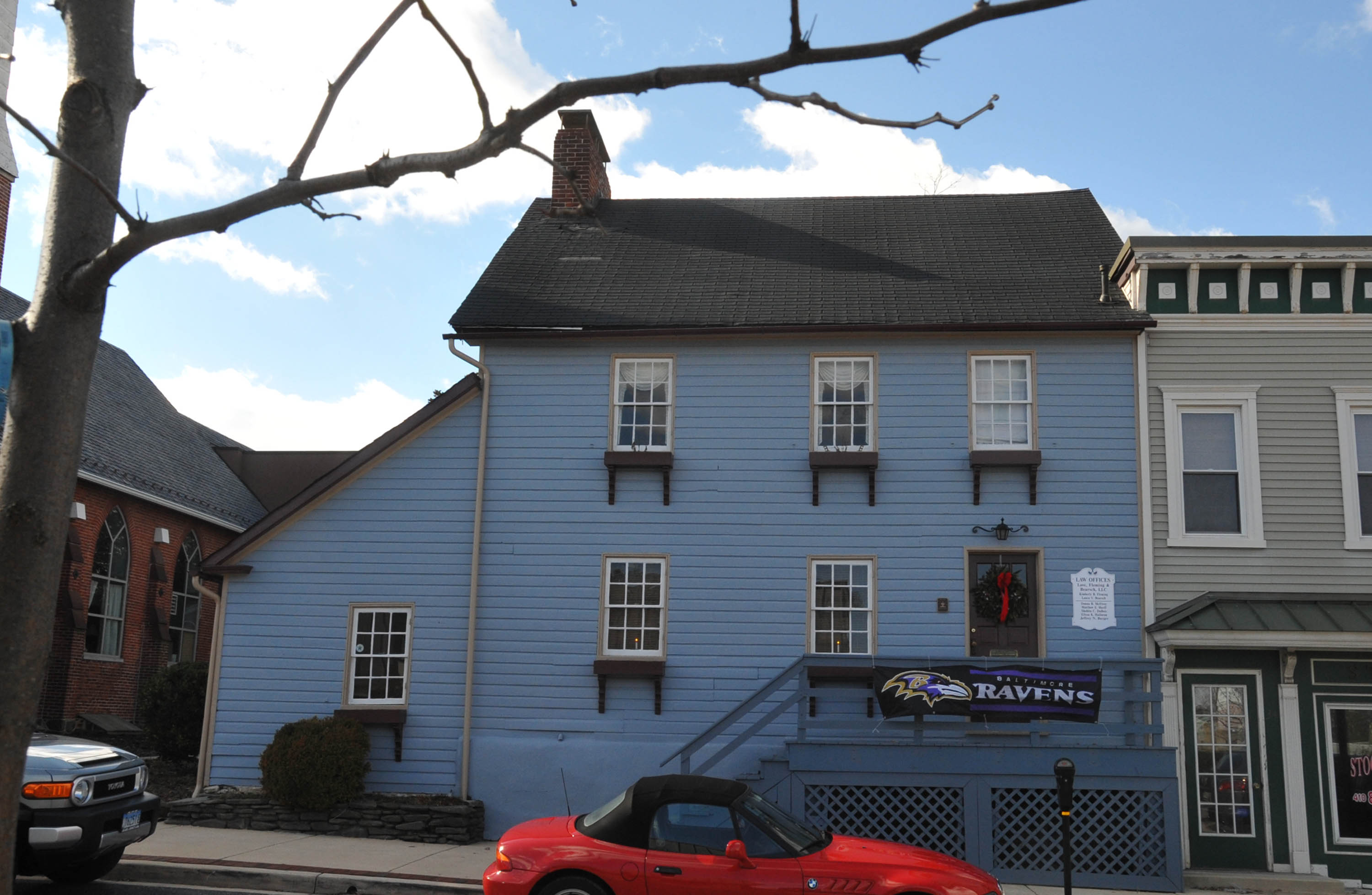
- Graham-Crocker House in 2013

- Location within Maryland Location within the United States
- Location: 30 N. Main St., Bel Air, Maryland
- Coordinates: 39°32′12″N 76°21′1″W
- Area: 0.1 acres (0.040 ha)
- Built: 1825
- NRHP reference No.: 80001813
- Added to NRHP: March 17, 1980

The Graham-Crocker House is a historic home located at 30 North Main Street, Bel Air, Harford County, Maryland, United States. It is a 2 1/2-story frame dwelling with a shed addition to the south and an ell to the west, and dating to about 1825.

The Graham-Crocker House was listed on the National Register of Historic Places in 1980.
