= Maryland Route 136 =

State highway in Harford County, Maryland, US

Maryland Route 136
- Maryland Route 136 highlighted in red

Route information
- Maintained by MDSHA
- Length: 30.04 mi (48.34 km)
- Existed: 1927–present
- Tourist routes: Mason and Dixon Scenic Byway

Major junctions
- South end: MD 7 near Abingdon
- MD 543 in Creswell; MD 22 in Churchville; US 1 near Dublin; MD 440 in Dublin; MD 165 in Whiteford; MD 24 near Pylesville
- North end: MD 23 in Norrisville

Location
- Country: United States
- State: Maryland
- Counties: Harford

Highway system
- Maryland highway system; Interstate; US; State; Scenic Byways
← MD 135	→ MD 137

Maryland Route 136 (MD 136) is a state highway in the U.S. state of Maryland. The state highway runs 30.04 miles (48.34 km) from MD 7 near Abingdon north to MD 23 in Norrisville. MD 136 is an L-shaped route that connects the communities of Creswell, Churchville, Dublin, and Whiteford in eastern Harford County with each other and with Norrisville in the county's northwestern corner. The state highway is connected to the cities of Aberdeen and Havre de Grace via its connection with MD 22. MD 136 is also linked to the county seat of Bel Air from the east through MD 22, from the northeast by U.S. Route 1 (US 1), from the north via MD 24, and from the northwest by MD 23. The state highway starts on the coastal plain near the Chesapeake Bay and crosses Harford County's two main tributaries of the Susquehanna River, Deer Creek and Broad Creek, while traversing a wide swath of the Piedmont. MD 136 is the second longest Maryland state highway entirely within one county after MD 235.

The first section of MD 136 was constructed east from what is now MD 165 in Whiteford in the early 1920s. That highway was extended south to US 1 near Dublin in the mid-1920s. MD 136 was extended south to US 40 (now MD 7) in the early 1930s; the highway was also extended north from Whiteford to Graceton in the same period. The portion of MD 136 between MD 24 and MD 23 was originally MD 517, which was constructed in the mid-1930s. MD 136 was extended west over the gap between Graceton and MD 24 and assumed all of MD 517 to Norrisville in the mid-1950s.

== Route description ==
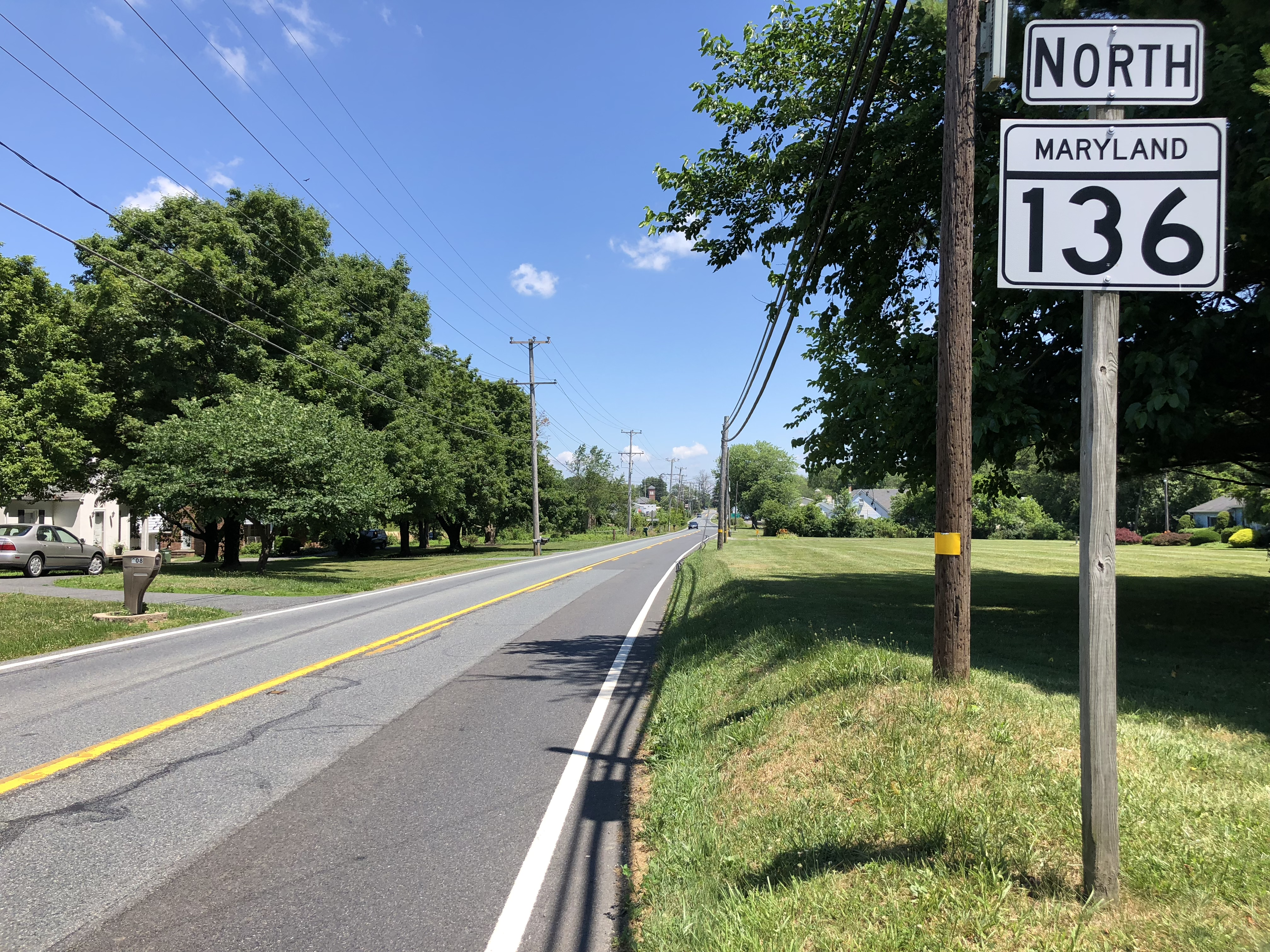
MD 136 northbound south of Churchville

MD 136 begins at an intersection with MD 7 (Philadelphia Road) east of Abingdon at the edge of Bush Declaration Natural Resources Management Area, just north of the confluence of Bynum Run and James Run to form the Bush River. The junction is near the site of the signing of the Bush Declaration, a 1775 resolution of Harford County citizens that supported the activities leading up to American Revolution. MD 136 heads north through farmland as two-lane undivided Calvary Road, which crosses over Interstate 95 (I-95, John F. Kennedy Memorial Highway) with no access. I-95 can be accessed via MD 543 (Fountain Green Road/Creswell Road), which MD 136 intersects in the village of Creswell.

North of Creswell, MD 136 passes to the west of Stoney Demonstration Forest, crosses Broad Run adjacent to a quarry in the hamlet of Calvary, and passes close to the historic home Webster's Forest, which is accessed via Asbury Road. The state highway continues north to Churchville, where MD 136 intersects MD 22 (Churchville Road) next to the village's namesake, Churchville Presbyterian Church. A short distance east of the intersection, MD 22—which connects Bel Air and Aberdeen—intersects MD 155 (Level Road), which leads to Havre de Grace.

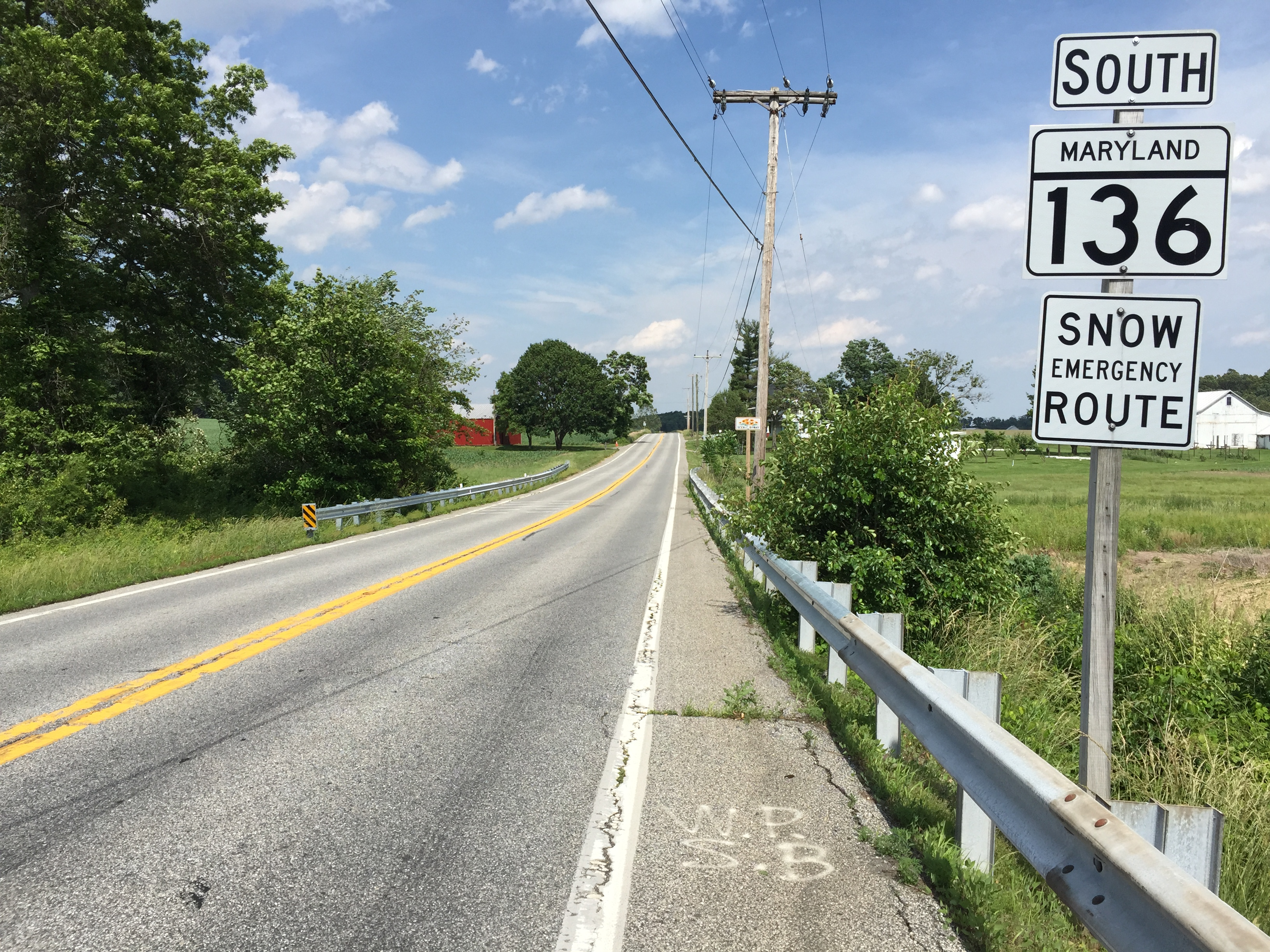
View south from the north end of MD 136 at MD 23 in Norrisville

MD 136 leaves Churchville as Priestford Road, which passes by the Churchville Test Area, an auxiliary unit of Aberdeen Proving Ground used to test Army vehicles. The state highway traverses Deer Creek at Priest Ford, which is the site of Priest Neal's Mass House and Mill Site, a historic church, and a junction with Harmony Church Road, which leads through the Lower Deer Creek Valley Historic District. MD 136 passes a loop of old alignment, Poplar Grove Road, before intersecting US 1 (Conowingo Road) at an acute angle in the hamlet of Poplar Grove. The state highway continues north as Whiteford Road, which passes another loop of old alignment, Dublin School Road, before meeting MD 440 (Dublin Road) in the village of Dublin.

MD 136 heads northwest out of Dublin, crossing Broad Creek and intersecting Robinson Mill Road, which follows the creek eastward, changing to a gated, closed, private dirt road within the Broad Creek Memorial Scout Reservation in the vicinity of the Broad Creek Soapstone Quarries. The state highway intersects the northern terminus of MD 646 (Prospect Road) in the hamlet of Prospect before approaching Whiteford. Whiteford and the neighboring village of Cardiff are part of the Whiteford-Cardiff Historic District, which preserve buildings from the 19th century when the area was a center of the slate industry. MD 136 expands to a four-lane undivided highway and intersects Old Pylesville Road, which serves as the main street of the villages, before crossing MD 165 (Pylesville Road).

MD 136 reduces to two lanes as it heads west from Whiteford toward the hamlet of Graceton, where the state highway intersects MD 624 (Graceton Road) within 2,000 feet (610 m) of the Pennsylvania state line. The state highway veers southwest and crosses Broad Run again before reaching Five Forks, where the state highway intersects Clermont Mill Road and MD 24 (Rocks Road). MD 136 heads west as Harkins Road, intersecting Fawn Grove Road in the hamlet of Harkins and traversing three tributaries of Deer Creek—Falling Branch, Big Branch, and Island Branch—before reaching its northern terminus at MD 23 (Norrisville Road) in Norrisville.

== History ==
Maryland Route 517
- Location: Norrisville–Pylesville
- Existed: 1933–1956

The first section of MD 136 to be constructed was Whiteford Road from Prospect to Whiteford by 1923. The remainder of Whiteford Road south to US 1 was constructed between 1924 and 1927. Priestford Road was built starting in 1930 from US 1. Both the Priestford Road and Calvary Road portions of MD 136 were completed in 1932, including a new bridge over Deer Creek at Priest Ford. In 1933, MD 136 achieved its original extent when the state highway was extended north from Whiteford to Graceton. The Harkins Road portion of MD 136 was originally designated MD 517. MD 517 was constructed as a modern highway from MD 24 at Five Forks west to Harkins in 1933. Harkins Road was extended west 2 miles (3.2 km) from Harkins in 1934 and 1935. MD 517 was completed west to MD 23 in Norrisville in 1936. MD 136 was relocated through Dublin in 1952 and 1953. The state highway reached its current extent in 1956 when the county highway between Graceton and Five Forks was transferred to state control; MD 136 was extended southwest to Five Forks then assumed all of MD 517 to its present northern terminus in Norrisville.

== Junction list ==
The entire route is in Harford County.

Location	mi	km	Destinations	Notes
Abingdon	0.00	0.00	MD 7 (Philadelphia Road) – Riverside, Edgewood	Southern terminus
Creswell	2.39	3.85	MD 543 (Fountain Green Road/Creswell Road) to I-95 – Riverside, Fountain Green	
Churchville	6.19	9.96	MD 22 (Churchville Road) – Bel Air, Aberdeen, Havre de Grace	
Dublin	11.81	19.01	US 1 (Conowingo Road) – Bel Air, Rising Sun	
Dublin	12.81	20.62	MD 440 (Dublin Road) – Ady, Darlington	
Prospect	16.24	26.14	MD 646 south (Prospect Road) / Prospect Road north – Ady	Northern terminus of MD 646
Whiteford	19.16	30.84	MD 165 (Pylesville Road) to PA 74 – Jarrettsville, York	
Graceton	21.64	34.83	MD 624 (Graceton Road) – Pylesville, Fawn Grove	
	23.75	38.22	MD 24 (Rocks Road) – Bel Air, Fawn Grove	
Norrisville	30.04	48.34	MD 23 (Norrisville Road) – Jarrettsville, Stewartstown	Northern terminus
1.000 mi = 1.609 km; 1.000 km = 0.621 mi
