= Maryland Route 543 =

State highway in Maryland, United States

Maryland Route 543
- Maryland Route 543 highlighted in red

Route information
- Maintained by MDSHA
- Length: 19.08 mi (30.71 km)
- Existed: 1933–present

Major junctions
- South end: US 40 in Riverside
- MD 7 in Riverside; I-95 in Riverside; MD 136 at Creswell; MD 22 in Fountain Green; US 1 in Hickory; MD 440 at Ady; MD 646 near Ady
- North end: MD 165 in Pylesville

Location
- Country: United States
- State: Maryland
- Counties: Harford

Highway system
- Maryland highway system; Interstate; US; State; Scenic Byways
← MD 542	→ MD 544

Maryland Route 543 (MD 543) is a state highway in the U.S. state of Maryland. The state highway runs 19.08 miles (30.71 km) from U.S. Route 40 (US 40) in Riverside north to MD 165 in Pylesville. MD 543 is a north–south highway through central Harford County that connects the communities of Creswell, Fountain Green, Hickory, and Ady with the county's four main east–west highways: US 40, Interstate 95 (I-95), MD 22, and US 1. MD 543 was originally constructed in the early 1930s from Hickory to north of Ady, where the highway followed part of what is now MD 646. The state highway swapped routes with MD 646 to end in Pylesville by 1946. MD 543 was extended south in three steps to MD 7 in the 1950s. The state highway was rerouted at its southern end when I-95 was constructed in the early 1960s and again when the highway's interchange with the Interstate was built in the early 1990s. MD 543 was extended south through Riverside to US 40 in the mid 1990s.

== Route description ==
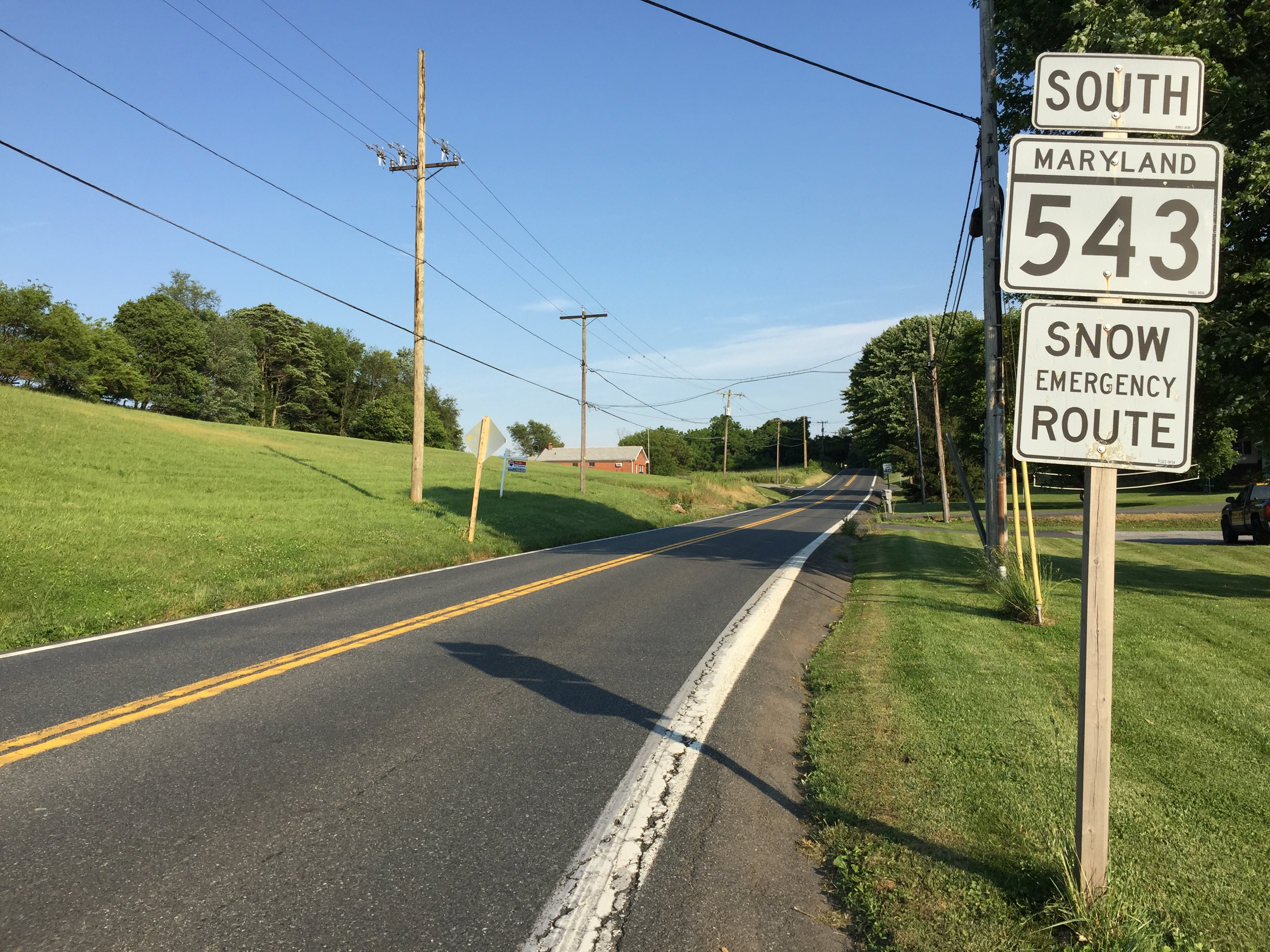
View south from the north end of MD 543 at MD 165 in Pylesville

MD 543 begins at an intersection with US 40 (Pulaski Highway) in an industrial area of Riverside. The state highway initially heads southeast from US 40, then curves clockwise 180 degrees toward the northwest to cross over US 40 and CSX's Philadelphia Subdivision railroad line. MD 543 heads northwest as Riverside Parkway, a partially controlled-access two-lane undivided highway between residential subdivisions. The state highway expands to a four-lane divided highway immediately before Church Creek Road and enters a commercial area. After intersecting MD 7 (Philadelphia Road), MD 543's name changes to Creswell Road and the highway meets I-95 (John F. Kennedy Memorial Highway) at a diamond interchange. The state highway reduces to a two-lane undivided road at its intersection with county-maintained Creswell Road.

MD 543 continues northwest and traverses James Run within the Harford Furnace Historic District. The state highway passes the historic homes Fair Meadows and Best Endeavor in the rural community of Creswell. After intersecting MD 136 (Calvary Road), MD 543 continues northwest as Fountain Green Road, which crosses over a branch of Bynum Run and passes the historic homes Mount Adams and Broom's Bloom. The state highway expands to a three-lane road with center turn lane as the highway becomes lined with residential subdivisions in the suburban community of Fountain Green. MD 543 reduces to two lanes after intersecting MD 22 (Churchville Road) in the center of the community. The state highway continues northwest through a mix of residential subdivisions, farmland, and forest on the way to Hickory, where MD 543 intersects US 1 (Hickory Bypass) and US 1 Business (Conowingo Road) in rapid succession.

MD 543 continues north as Ady Road into rural areas. Just before crossing Deer Creek, the state highway intersects Walters Mill Road, which provides access to the historic D. H. Springhouse. MD 543 continues north and intersects the western terminus of MD 440 (Dublin Road) and the southern terminus of MD 646 (Prospect Road) in the hamlets of Ady and Emory Church, respectively. MD 543 parallels Broad Creek and intersects Highland Road, which heads west from the state highway to serve the village of Street, as the highway continues northwest to Pylesville. In Pylesville, the state highway intersects Old Pylesville Road, with a park and ride lot located west of the intersection, and crosses a tributary of Broad Creek before reaching its northern terminus at MD 165 (Pylesville Road).

== History ==
MD 543 follows or has followed the courses of MD 158, MD 634, and MD 646 in addition to its own number. The earliest predecessor highway of MD 543 was MD 158 (Belcamp Road), which ran from the community of Belcamp on the Bush River a short distance west of MD 543's present southern terminus north to Creswell Road just north of I-95. Belcamp Road was constructed under state aid as a 12-foot (3.7 m) wide macadam road by 1915. MD 543 itself was constructed in four sections between 1930 and 1933: US 1 in Hickory to Deer Creek, Deer Creek to MD 440 in Ady, MD 440 to the MD 646 intersection at Emory Church, and along modern MD 646 from Emory Church to just north of Mill Green. MD 646 was originally assigned to the highway from Emory Church to Pylesville that was constructed around 1938. Another predecessor highway, MD 634, was under construction by 1936 and completed by 1938 from Creswell to Fountain Green.

By 1946, MD 543 and MD 646 had swapped to their present routes north from Emory Church toward Pylesville and Mill Green, respectively. Fountain Green Road was reconstructed from Fountain Green to Hickory between 1950 and 1952, at which time MD 543 was extended south to Fountain Green. By 1954, MD 543 assumed the course of MD 634 from Fountain Green to Creswell. Creswell Road was constructed as a modern highway in 1950; MD 543 was extended southeast from Creswell to MD 7 a short distance east of the present MD 7–MD 543 intersection in 1956, the same year MD 158 was removed from the state highway system.

When I-95 was constructed in 1963, Creswell Road was cut in two near MD 543's southern terminus. MD 543 was rerouted onto Belcamp Road, which did cross over I-95, south to its intersection with MD 7. MD 543 was moved to its present alignment from its intersection with the county-maintained portion of Creswell Road south to MD 7 in Riverside when the highway's interchange with I-95 was completed in 1991. Riverside Parkway's bridge over CSX's Philadelphia Subdivision and US 40 was completed in 1995. MD 543 was extended south over Riverside Parkway from MD 7 to its present terminus at US 40 around 1997.

== Junction list ==
The entire route is in Harford County.

Location	mi	km	Destinations	Notes
Riverside	0.00	0.00	US 40 (Pulaski Highway) – Edgewood, Aberdeen, APG Gate	Southern terminus
Riverside	1.47	2.37	MD 7 (Philadelphia Road) – Abingdon, Aberdeen	
Riverside	1.70	2.74	I-95 (John F. Kennedy Memorial Highway) – Baltimore, New York	I-95 Exit 80
Creswell	3.63	5.84	MD 136 (Calvary Road) – Abingdon, Churchville	
Fountain Green	7.37	11.86	MD 22 (Churchville Road) – Bel Air, Churchville	
Hickory	10.17	16.37	US 1 (Hickory Bypass) – Bel Air, Rising Sun	
Hickory	10.43	16.79	US 1 Bus. (Conowingo Road)	
Ady	14.99	24.12	MD 440 east (Dublin Road) – Dublin	Western terminus of MD 440
Ady	15.92	25.62	MD 646 north (Prospect Road) – Prospect	Southern terminus of MD 646
Pylesville	19.08	30.71	MD 165 (Pylesville Road) – Jarrettsville, Whiteford	Northern terminus
1.000 mi = 1.609 km; 1.000 km = 0.621 mi
