= Maryland Route 646 =

State highway in Maryland, United States

Maryland Route 646
- Prospect Road
- Maryland Route 646 highlighted in red

Route information
- Maintained by MDSHA
- Length: 3.31 mi (5.33 km)
- Existed: 1946–present

Major junctions
- South end: MD 543 near Ady
- North end: MD 136 at Prospect

Location
- Country: United States
- State: Maryland
- Counties: Harford

Highway system
- Maryland highway system; Interstate; US; State; Scenic Byways
← MD 645	→ MD 648

Maryland Route 646 (MD 646) is a state highway in the U.S. state of Maryland. Known as Prospect Road, the state highway runs 3.31 miles (5.33 km) from MD 543 near Ady north to MD 136 at Prospect. MD 646 was constructed as a section of MD 543 in the early 1930s. That section of MD 543 and the road originally marked as MD 646 swapped numbers by 1946.

== Route description ==
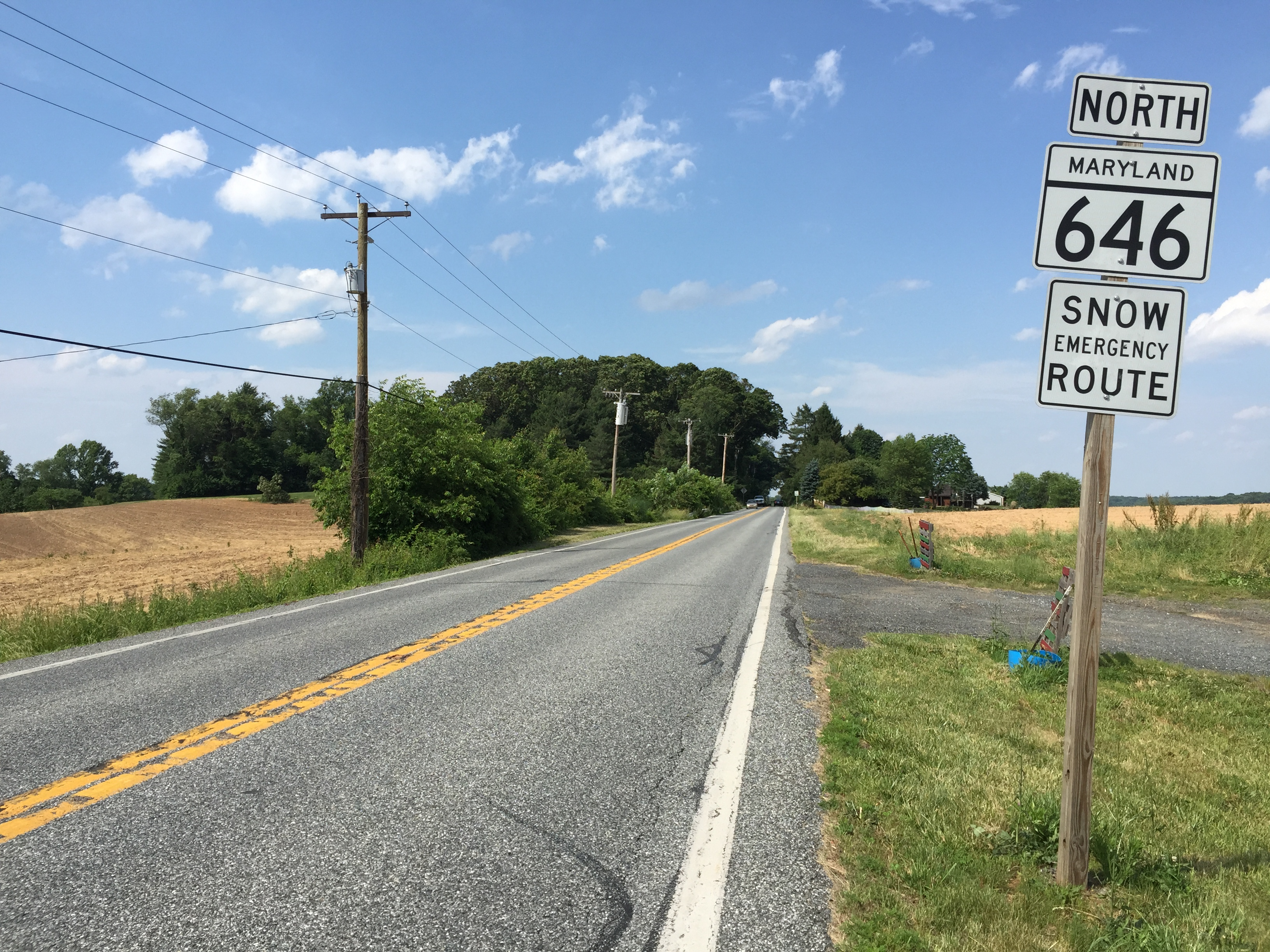
View north along MD 646 past MD 543 near Ady

MD 646 begins at an intersection with MD 543 (Ady Road) in the hamlet of Emory Church near Ady. Cherry Hill Road heads west from the other side of MD 543 as a county highway toward Rocks State Park. MD 646 heads northeast as a two-lane undivided road through farmland. After crossing Broad Creek, the state highway passes through the Mill Green Historic District, where it intersects Mill Green Road. MD 646 crosses Broad Creek again and continues to its northern terminus at MD 136 (Whiteford Road) in the hamlet of Prospect. Prospect Road continues north as a county highway toward the Pennsylvania state line.

== History ==
The portion of modern MD 646 from MD 543 at Emory Church to just north of Mill Green was constructed in 1933 as the northern end of MD 543. MD 646 was originally assigned to the section of MD 543 between Emory Church and Pylesville, which was constructed around 1938. By 1946, MD 646 and MD 543 had swapped to their present routes north from Emory Church toward Mill Green and Pylesville, respectively. MD 646 was extended north to MD 136 in 1950.

== Junction list ==
The entire route is in Harford County.

Location	mi	km	Destinations	Notes
Ady	0.00	0.00	MD 543 (Ady Road) / Cherry Hill Road west – Pylesville, Bel Air	Southern terminus
Prospect	3.31	5.33	MD 136 (Whiteford Road) / Prospect Road north – Whiteford, Dublin	Northern terminus
1.000 mi = 1.609 km; 1.000 km = 0.621 mi
