= Maryland Route 440 =

State highway in Maryland, United States

Maryland Route 440
- Dublin Road
- Maryland Route 440 highlighted in red

Route information
- Maintained by MDSHA
- Length: 5.65 mi (9.09 km)
- Existed: 1933–present

Major junctions
- West end: MD 543 in Ady
- MD 136 in Dublin
- East end: US 1 near Dublin

Location
- Country: United States
- State: Maryland
- Counties: Harford

Highway system
- Maryland highway system; Interstate; US; State; Scenic Byways
← MD 439	→ MD 444

Maryland Route 440 (MD 440) is a state highway in the U.S. state of Maryland. Known as Dublin Road, the state highway runs 5.65 miles (9.09 km) from MD 543 in Ady east to U.S. Route 1 (US 1) near Dublin. MD 440 was built between Ady and MD 136 in Dublin in the early 1930s and extended east to US 1 in 1956.

== Route description ==
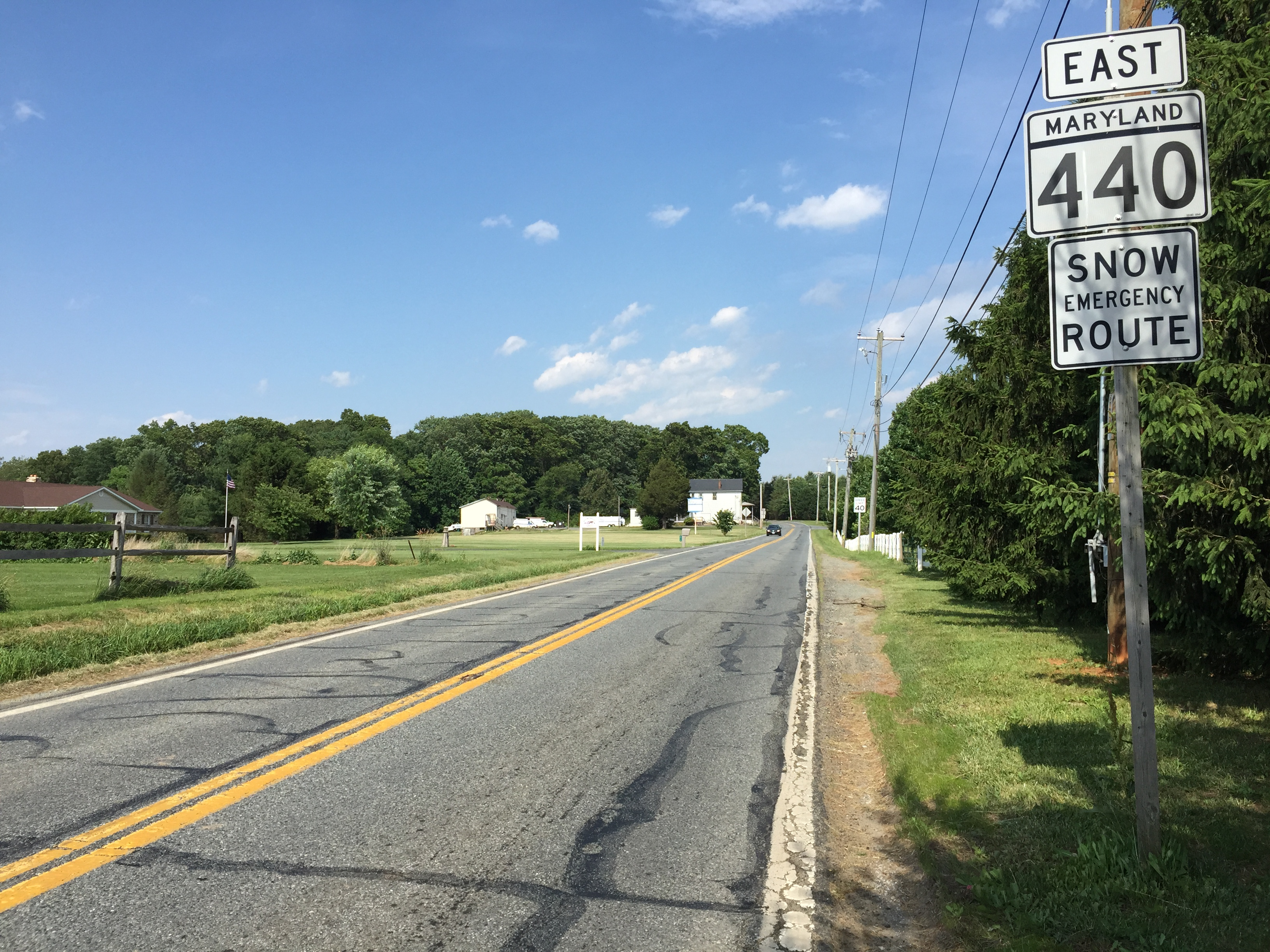
View east along MD 440 in Ady

MD 440 begins at an intersection with MD 543 (Ady Road) in the hamlet of Ady. The state highway heads east as a two-lane undivided road through farmland. MD 440 passes by the forested Scarboro Conservation Area and passes through the hamlet of Scarboro before intersecting MD 136 (Whiteford Road) in the village of Dublin. The state highway crosses Peddler Run before reaching its eastern terminus at US 1 (Conowingo Road) between Dublin and Darlington.

== History ==
MD 440 was constructed as a macadam road from MD 543 at Ady to MD 136 in Dublin between 1930 and 1933. The state highway was extended east to US 1 in 1956.

== Junction list ==
The entire route is in Harford County.

Location	mi	km	Destinations	Notes
Ady	0.00	0.00	MD 543 (Ady Road) – Pylesville, Hickory	Western terminus
Dublin	3.85	6.20	MD 136 (Whiteford Road) – Whiteford, Churchville	
Dublin	5.65	9.09	US 1 (Conowingo Road) – Bel Air, Darlington	Eastern terminus
1.000 mi = 1.609 km; 1.000 km = 0.621 mi
