= U.S. Route 1 in Maryland =

Section of U.S. Route in Maryland, United States

U.S. Route 1
- US 1 highlighted in red

Route information
- Maintained by MDSHA, BCDOT
- Length: 80.86 mi (130.13 km)
- Existed: November 11, 1926–present
- Tourist routes: Mason and Dixon Scenic Byway; Lower Susquehanna Scenic Byway

Major junctions
- South end: US 1 at the D.C. border in Mount Rainier
- I-95 / I-495 in College Park; MD 200 Toll near Beltsville; MD 100 near Elkridge; I-895 Toll near Relay; I-195 in Relay; I-695 near Arbutus; US 40 in Baltimore; I-83 in Baltimore; I-695 near White Marsh; US 222 in Conowingo
- North end: US 1 at the Pennsylvania border near Rising Sun

Location
- Country: United States
- State: Maryland
- Counties: Prince George's, Howard, Baltimore, City of Baltimore, Harford, Cecil

Highway system
- United States Numbered Highway System; List; Special; Divided; Maryland highway system; Interstate; US; State; Scenic Byways
← MD 998	→ MD 2

U.S. Route 1 (US 1) is the easternmost and longest of the major north–south routes of the older 1920s era United States Numbered Highway System, running from Key West, Florida, to Fort Kent, Maine. In the U.S. state of Maryland, it runs 81 miles (130 km) from the Washington, D.C. line to the Pennsylvania state line near the town of Rising Sun.

US 1 is paralleled by several major highways as it passes through Maryland, including Interstate 95 (I-95), the Baltimore–Washington Parkway (B–W Parkway), US 29, and US 301. Thus, US 1 has lost its significance as a long distance route through the state. It is often congested, however, because it remains a major route in the individual towns it traverses.

== Route description ==
=== Prince George's County ===
US 1 leaves the District of Columbia as Rhode Island Avenue NE and just simply becomes Rhode Island Avenue, a four-lane divided street with parking through a downtown-like commercial area, right after crossing the intersection of Eastern Avenue NE (the Maryland–DC line) and entering the city of Mount Rainier in Prince George's County. US 1 then meets the intersections of 34th and Perry streets at a roundabout (which was finished being constructed during August 2001 and replaced the traffic lights originally at this intersection) and then continues northeast through a densely populated residential area. The highway leaves Mount Rainier and enters Brentwood, where the highway meets Maryland Route 208 (MD 208; 38th Street). US 1 passes through North Brentwood as a four-lane divided highway without parking through a mix of residences and commercial establishments. The median widens as the highway crosses Northwest Branch Anacostia River and enters the city of Hyattsville. The highway begins to closely parallel CSX Transportation's Capital Subdivision railroad line and MARC Train's Camden Line as it reduces to a four-lane undivided highway, passing the District Court of Maryland for Prince George's County building. US 1 curves to the north, and the highway's name changes to Baltimore Avenue at Farragut Street, shortly before intersecting US 1 Alternate (US 1 Alt.).

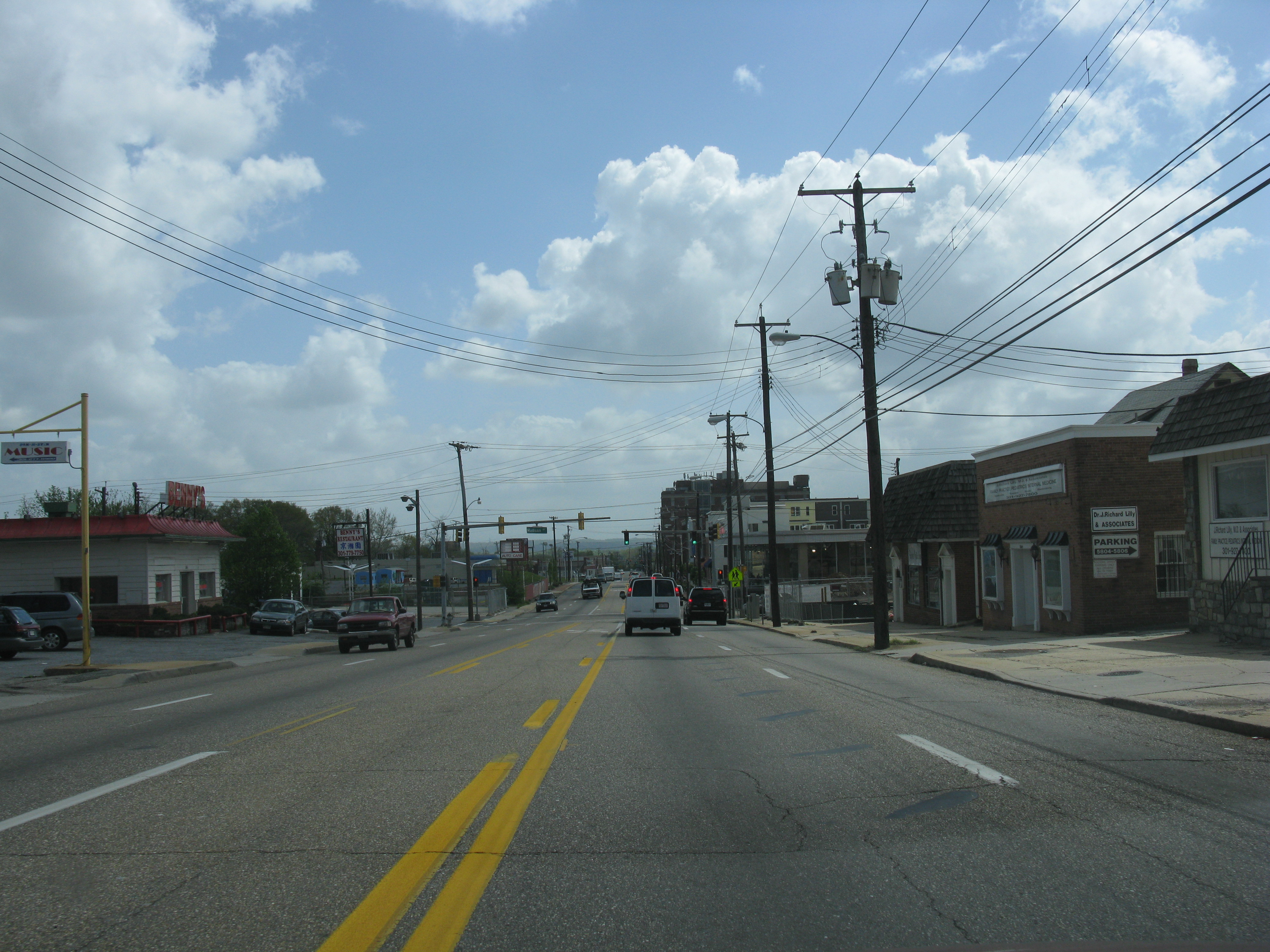
US 1 approaching Madison Street in Hyattsville

US 1 continues north through downtown Hyattsville, gaining a center turn lane before entering the town of Riverdale Park, where the highway intersects MD 410 (East–West Highway). The highway enters a densely populated residential area, passing between Riverdale Park to the east and the town of University Park to the west. Shortly after the highway enters the city of College Park on the east, US 1 intersects Queens Chapel Road at a five-way intersection with the town of University Park still on the west side. Only busses may enter Queens Chapel Road from US 1. The highway fully enters College Park and enters the commercial area that makes up the downtown of the college town, expanding to a four-lane divided highway. After the intersection with College Avenue and Regents Drive, US 1 passes through the campus of the University of Maryland, College Park, including the historic Rossborough Inn and Fraternity Row. The highway leaves the campus after intersecting Campus Drive, which is unsigned MD 431, and crossing Paint Branch.

US 1 continues through the northern part of College Park as a five-lane road with center turn lane, passing through a suburban commercial area. The highway intersects Greenbelt Road, which is unsigned MD 430, before meeting MD 193 (University Boulevard) at a partial interchange. All movements not provided in the interchange require using Greenbelt Road to connect between US 1 and MD 193. After intersecting Cherry Hill Road, US 1 becomes a divided highway and meets I-95/I-495 (Capital Beltway) at a partial cloverleaf interchange. North of the interchange, the highway expands to a six-lane divided highway, leaving the town of College Park and passing by businesses and through a swath of the Henry A. Wallace Beltsville Agricultural Research Center, including the U.S. National Agricultural Library.

At Sunnyside Avenue, the highway reduces to a five-lane road with center turn lane and passes through a suburban commercial area in the unincorporated town of Beltsville. The highway meets Rhode Island Avenue at an oblique intersection and MD 212A (Powder Mill Road) at a more orthogonal intersection. Past this, the road curves north and parallels CSX Transportation's Capital Subdivision. The highway passes between a commercial strip on the southbound side of the highway and an industrial area on the east side of the railroad tracks. US 1 leaves Beltsville after crossing Indian Creek. The highway temporarily expands to a four-lane divided highway before returning to a five-lane road, passing between an industrial area to the east and office parks to the west. The road comes to an intersection with the official eastern terminus of MD 212 (Ritz Way). After Muirkirk Meadows Drive, which leads to Muirkirk Road, US 1 reduces to a four-lane undivided highway, passes under the latter highway, and intersects the eastern terminus of MD 200 (Intercounty Connector) and the ICC Trail before it enters a forested area.

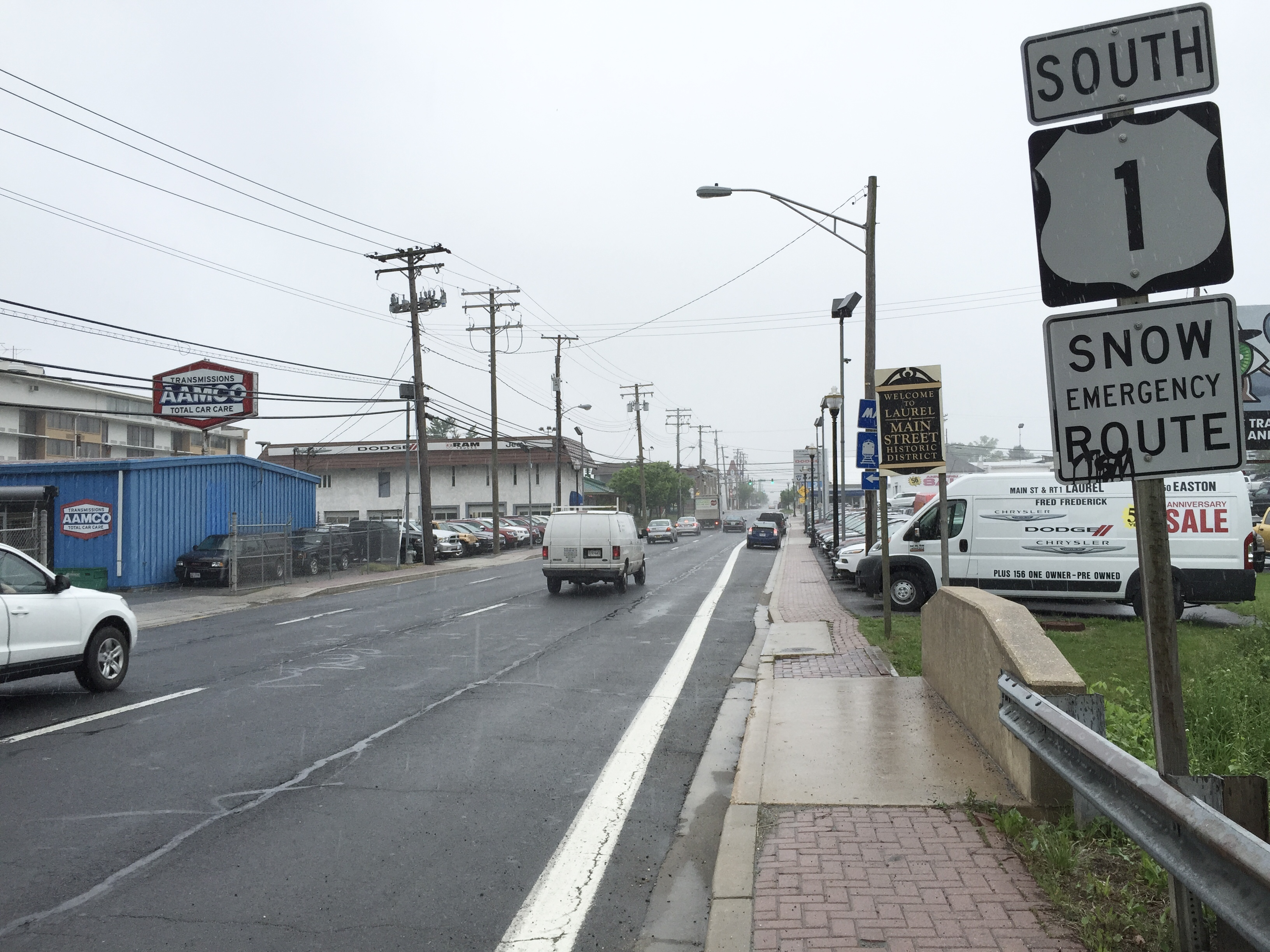
US 1 southbound in Laurel

US 1 gradually veers away from the railroad tracks as it approaches Laurel, passing Maryland National Memorial Park before entering a suburban commercial area ahead of Contee Road, where the center turn lane returns. At Cypress Street, the southbound direction gains a third lane through the intersection with Cherry Lane, where the northbound direction gains a third lane. After passing Towne Centre at Laurel and Laurel Shopping Center, US 1 splits into a one-way pair. The three to four northbound lanes veer northeast as Second Street, while the three to four southbound lanes take the name Washington Boulevard. The one-way pair intersects Bowie Road, the old alignment of MD 197, before intersecting MD 198, which takes the form of a one-way pair, eastbound Gorman Avenue and westbound Talbott Avenue. US 1 continues through the city of Laurel, intersecting Main Street just west of Laurel station before leaving Laurel by crossing the Patuxent River into Howard County.

=== Howard County ===
Immediately after crossing the Patuxent River, both directions of US 1 pass entrances to Laurel Park. The highway continues through North Laurel, with the one-way pair coming together shortly before the intersection with Whiskey Bottom Road. US 1 continues north as a five-lane road with center turn lane, crossing Hammond Branch. As the highway passes through a commercial area in Savage, the road becomes a divided highway. After Gorman Road, the roadways temporarily diverge to cross the Little Patuxent River, then come together again at the full cloverleaf interchange with MD 32 (Patuxent Freeway). US 1 becomes undivided and intersects Guilford Road and crosses over the Columbia Branch from CSX Transportation's Capital Subdivision to the east. The highway passes several industrial parks, crossing Dorsey Run twice before intersecting MD 175 (Waterloo Road) in Jessup.

North of Jessup, US 1 crosses Deep Run and passes more industrial parks. The highway intersects MD 103 (Meadowridge Road) and passes Meadow Ridge Memorial Park before a partial cloverleaf interchange with MD 100 near Dorsey. Continuing northeast past Bealmear Branch, Old Washington Road splits to the northeast to pass through the center of Elkridge shortly before US 1 intersects the old alignment of MD 103, Montgomery Road. The highway passes through a shallow S-curve before receiving the other end of Old Washington Road and passes under the Capital Subdivision. US 1's two directions become divided by a Jersey barrier as the highway passes through the commercial strip in Elkridge, passing ramps to and from I-895 (Harbor Tunnel Thruway) immediately before crossing the upper Patapsco River into Baltimore County.

=== Baltimore City and County ===
After passing under I-895, US 1 intersects South Street, which provides access to St. Denis and Relay, and passes through its interchange with I-195 (Metropolitan Boulevard). The undivided highway crosses over CSX Transportation's Baltimore Terminal Subdivision railroad line before reaching the partial interchange with US 1 Alt. Washington Boulevard continues straight northeast as US 1 Alt. through Halethorpe, while US 1 exits onto Southwestern Boulevard to head north through Arbutus. The three-lane road with center turn lane and extra-wide shoulders parallels Amtrak's Northeast Corridor railroad line and MARC Train's Penn Line. After crossing Herbert Run, US 1 parallels the long, linear parking lot of Halethorpe station. The highway leaves the station after passing under Francis Avenue. US 1 expands to a five-lane road with center turn lane as it crosses under I-95. US 1 passes under Sulphur Spring Road and I-695 (Baltimore Beltway) as the highway heads out of Arbutus. The only connection with I-695 is a single ramp, exit 12A, from I-695 east to US 1 south. Inside the beltway, US 1 is paralleled by Leeds Avenue, which intersects the federal highway just before entering the city of Baltimore.

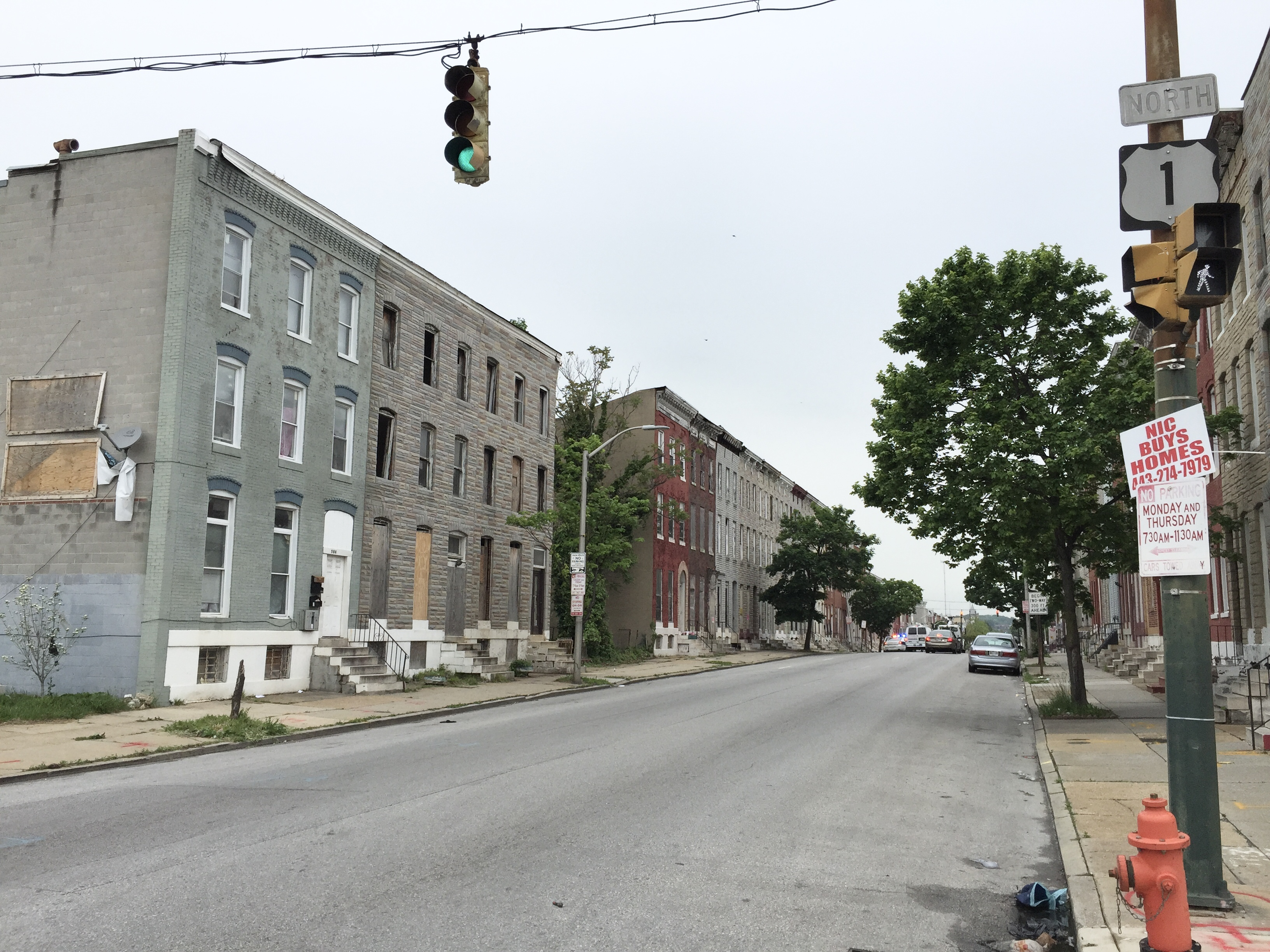
View north along US 1 (Fulton Street) at US 40 in Baltimore

US 1 continues north as a four-lane divided street through a densely populated urban residential area. A short distance north of the city line, US 1 curves to the east onto Wilkens Avenue, which continues west as MD 372. The highway crosses Amtrak's Northeast Corridor and reduces to an undivided highway, intersecting US 1 Alt. (Caton Avenue) as it passes through a curve. US 1 crosses Gwynns Falls and CSX Transportation's Hanover Subdivision railroad line, expanding to a divided highway before passing the Deck of Cards rowhouses between Brunswick Street and Millington Avenue. A short distance to the east, US 1 turns north onto a one-way pair, Monroe Street southbound and Fulton Avenue northbound, to pass through a densely populated urban residential area on the west side of central Baltimore. US 1 meets the eastern terminus of MD 144 at another one-way pair, Pratt and Lombard streets. The highway passes over the US 40 freeway, which is accessed by the one-way pair adjacent to the freeway, Mulberry and Franklin streets. At Edmondson Avenue, Fulton Avenue becomes two-way; however, southbound US 1 remains on Monroe Street. Shortly after passing over Amtrak's Northeast Corridor, US 1 reaches North Avenue. The Fulton Avenue/Monroe Street one-way pair continues north as MD 140, while both directions of US 1 turn east onto North Avenue.

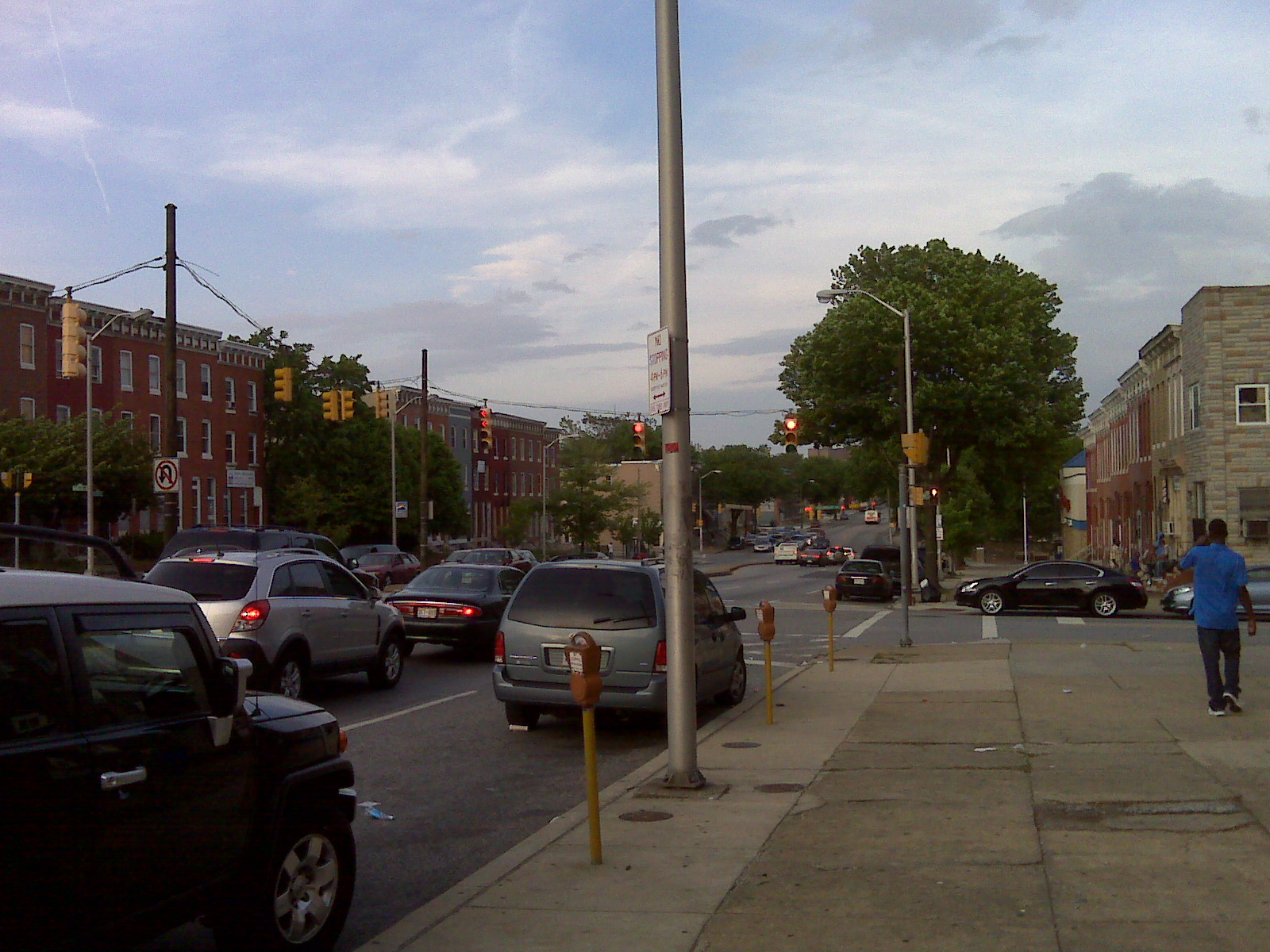
View of US 1 (North Avenue) in Baltimore, looking east at the intersection of Barclay Street

North Avenue heads east as a four-lane undivided highway through the junction with MD 129, which follows southbound Druid Hill Avenue and northbound McCulloh Street. US 1 continues east as a four-lane divided highway with parking lanes. The highway meets I-83 (Jones Falls Expressway) and Mount Royal Avenue next to North Avenue station of Maryland Transit Administration's Baltimore Light RailLink. US 1 expands to six lanes and crosses over the light rail tracks, Jones Falls, MD 25 (Falls Road), and CSX Transportation's Baltimore Terminal Subdivision. Due north of Downtown Baltimore, North Avenue intersects Charles Street (MD 139 to the north), St. Paul and Calvert streets (MD 2 to the south), and Greenmount Avenue (MD 45 to the north), after which North Avenue passes along the north side of Green Mount Cemetery. North Avenue reduces to a four-lane undivided street east of MD 45. Shortly after intersecting MD 147 (Harford Road) and Broadway, US 1 turns northeast onto Bel Air Road.

Now a four-lane undivided road, US 1 crosses the Baltimore Terminal Subdivision again and passes Clifton Park before reaching Erdman Avenue, which heads southeast as MD 151. The highway crosses Herring Run before intersecting Moravia Road, where Bel Air Road transitions from passing through densely populated residential neighborhoods to being the center of a commercial strip. US 1 intersects Frankford and Hamilton avenues before leaving the city of Baltimore at Fleetwood Avenue, which forms the eastbound component of a one-way pair with Northern Parkway at the latter street's eastern terminus. US 1 passes through the inner suburb of Overlea, crossing Stemmers Run before meeting I-695 (Baltimore Beltway) at a cloverleaf interchange.

US 1 continues northeast from the beltway as a six-lane divided highway. The highway intersects Rossville Boulevard and Putty Hill Road, then crosses MD 43 (White Marsh Boulevard). US 1 accesses MD 43 via two quadrant ramps with a right-in/right-out interchange southbound and an intersection with Dunfield Road northbound. North of MD 43, US 1 reduces to a four-lane undivided highway as it passes through Perry Hall, intersecting Silver Spring, Joppa, and Ebenezer roads in the midst of a commercial strip. After the intersection with Honeygo Boulevard, US 1 descends into a steep valley to cross Gunpowder Falls, passing southeast of a park-and-ride lot before the bridge. The highway continues north through a mix of farmland and residential subdivisions, heading through Kingsville before passing through Gunpowder Falls State Park and leaving Baltimore County by crossing Little Gunpowder Falls.

=== Harford and Cecil counties ===
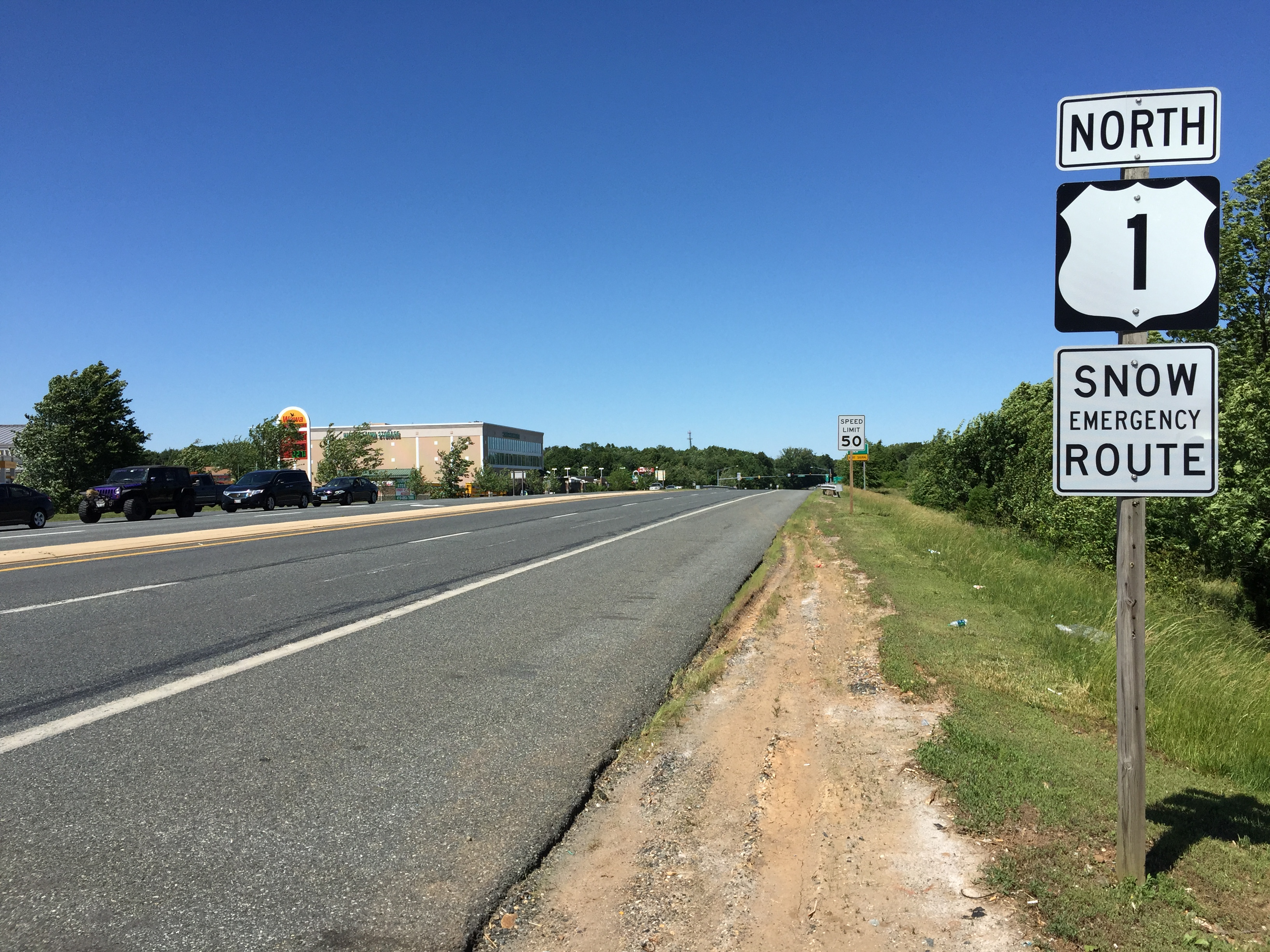
US 1 northbound on the Hickory Bypass at US 1 Bus. in Bel Air North

US 1 heads northeast into Harford County, passing through a forested area and then the residential subdivisions of Pleasant Hills before reaching MD 152 (Mountain Road). The highway continues east through a commercial strip toward the hamlet of Benson, where US 1 converges with MD 147 (Harford Road) at an acute angle. US 1 Business (US 1 Bus.) heads east from the intersection toward Bel Air, while US 1 continues northeast on the Bel Air bypass. The bypass begins as a four-lane divided highway but drops to a two-lane road before crossing Winters Run. US 1 intersects Tollgate Road, gaining a lane northbound, before meeting MD 24 (Vietnam Veterans Memorial Highway) at a T intersection with sweeping right-turn ramps. MD 24 joins US 1 in a concurrency north on a four-lane undivided highway that passes under Vale Road. MD 24 leaves US 1 at a partial cloverleaf interchange with Rock Spring Road, which heads south as MD 924 toward downtown Bel Air. The bypass continues northeast with two lanes, its name changed to the Hickory Bypass before expanding to a four-lane divided highway and intersecting US 1 Bus. (Conowingo Road) south of Hickory. US 1 intersects the eastern end of MD 23 (East–West Highway) and MD 543 (Ady Road) before reducing to a two-lane road and receiving the northern end of US 1 Bus.

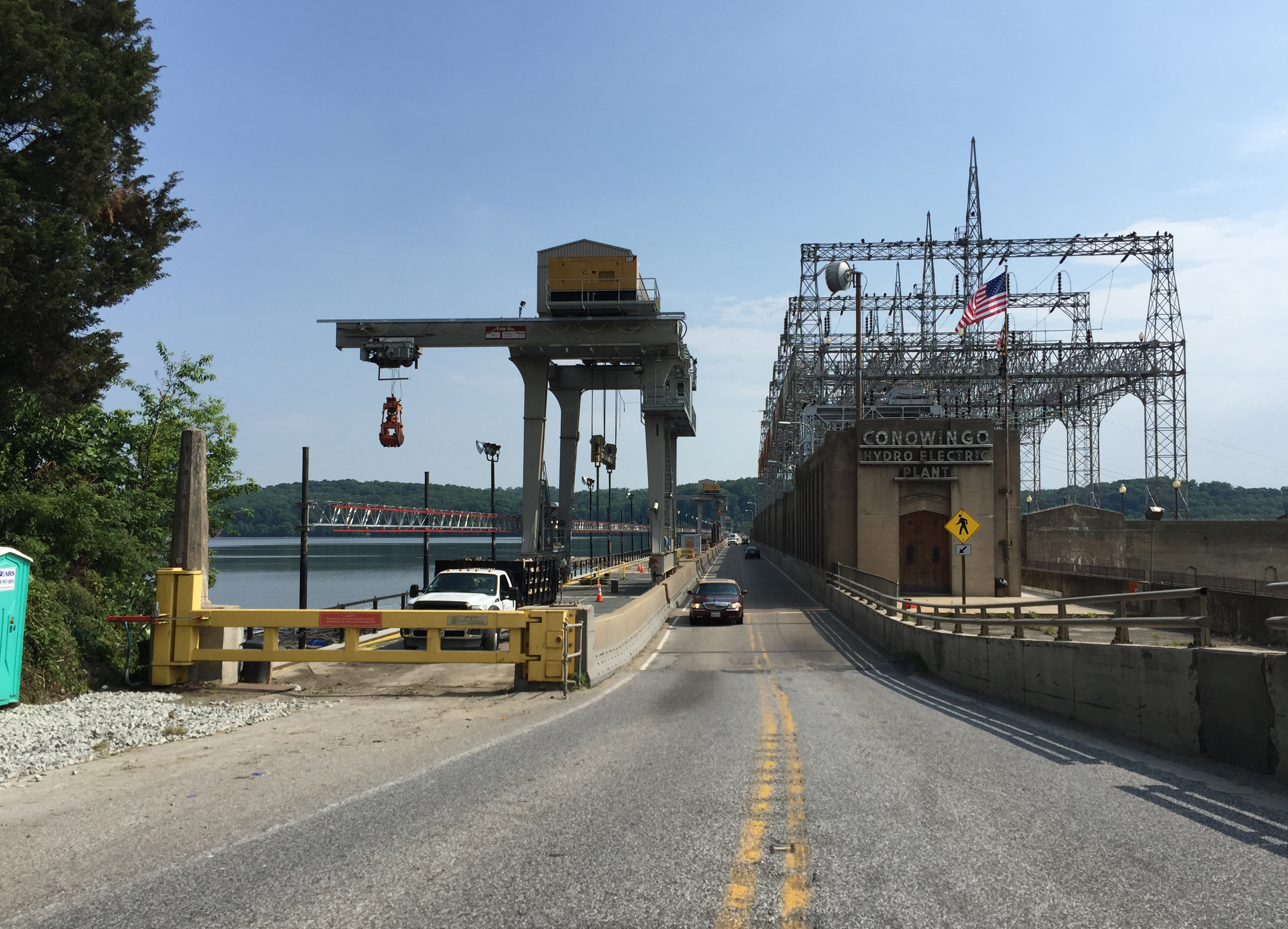
US 1 northbound approaching the Conowingo Dam on the Susquehanna River between Harford and Cecil counties

US 1 continues northeast as Conowingo Road through farmland. The old alignment of US 1, Forge Hill Road, splits to the east in Kalmia and rejoins the present highway three miles (4.8 km) later after separate crossings of Deer Creek. The highway passes through a commercial strip around the intersection with MD 136 (Whiteford Road/Priestford Road) as US 1 passes to the south of Dublin. US 1 curves east at the intersection with MD 440 (Dublin Road). Smith Road, another old alignment of US 1, splits to the northeast as US 1 heads toward Darlington, where it meets MD 161 (Main Street) and MD 623 (Castleton Road). The highway passes a weigh station on the southbound side that serves both directions immediately after the MD 623 intersection and heads straight over a series of hills, gaining climbing lanes in either direction. At Shuresville Road, US 1 curves to the northeast and crosses the Susquehanna River on top of Conowingo Dam, a hydroelectric dam owned by Constellation Energy, into Cecil County.

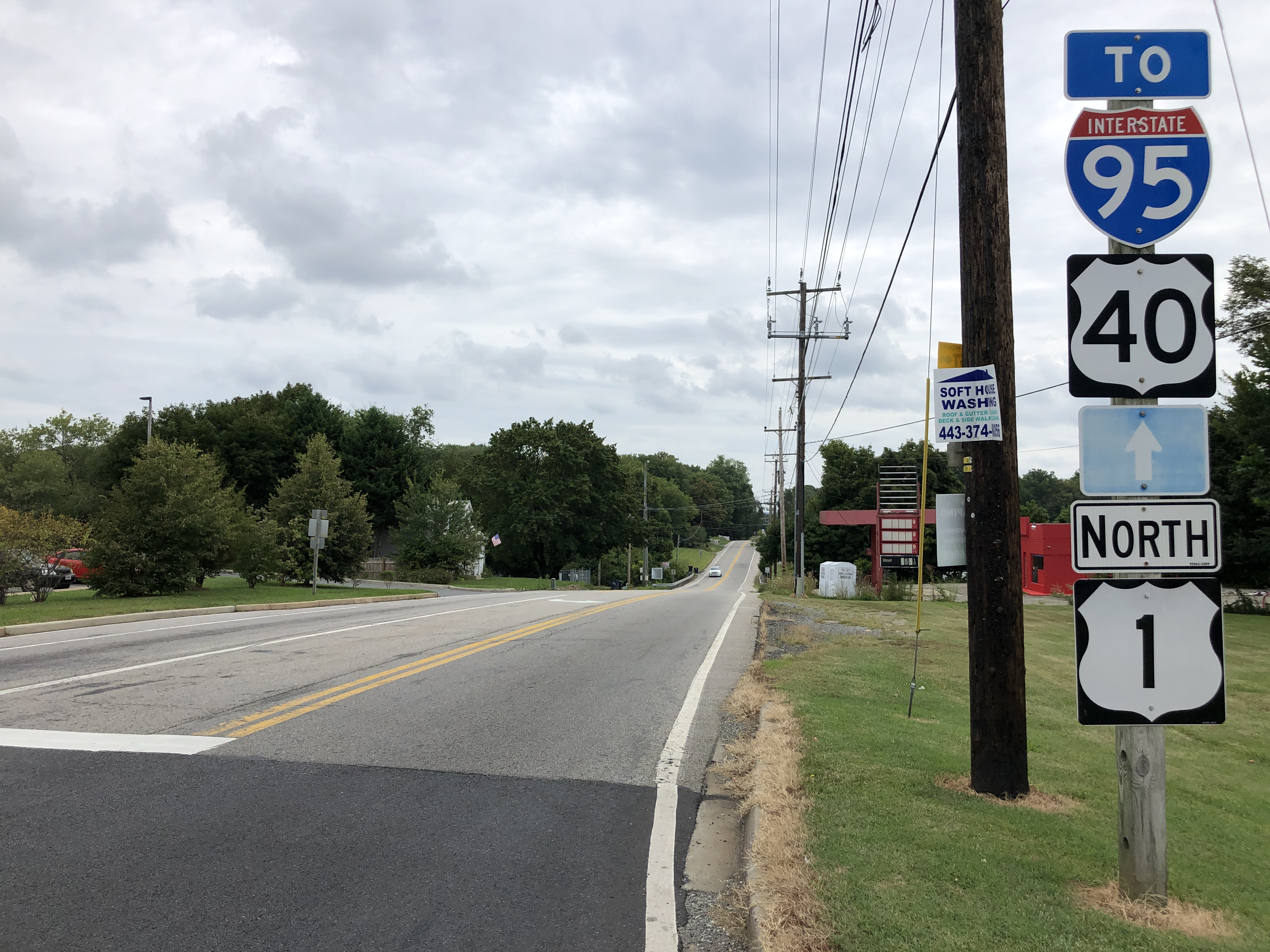
US 1 northbound past US 222 in Conowingo

Immediately on the east side of the river, US 1 intersects the northern terminus of MD 222 (Susquehanna River Road) and passes over Norfolk Southern Railway's Port Road Branch. The highway gains a climbing lane northbound as it ascends a hill to Conowingo, where the highway meets the southern terminus of US 222 (Rock Springs Road). US 1 turns east and meets a pair of old alignments: Connelly Road heading northwest and MD 591 (Colora Road) heading southeast toward a removed bridge over Octoraro Creek. After US 1 crosses the creek, the old alignment reconnects with the mainline as another segment of MD 591, Porters Bridge Road. West of Rising Sun, MD 273 (Rising Sun Road) continues straight toward the town while US 1 curves northeast as the Rising Sun bypass. US 1 intersects the northern terminus of MD 276 (Jacob Tome Memorial Highway) and crosses Stone Run twice before turning north to the Pennsylvania state line. The highway continues across the state line toward Oxford, Pennsylvania, becoming a four-lane divided highway just across the state line.

== History ==
=== Colonial and turnpike eras ===
The original predecessors of US 1 were a collection of dirt roads cut through the forests and farmland of central and northern Maryland in the 18th century. Construction of these roads was governed by a 1704 Act of the Province of Maryland requiring counties to oversee construction and build 20-foot-wide (6.1 m) roads to benefit transport of carts between population centers. The first segment of the road between Baltimore and Washington DC was built in 1741 between Baltimore and Elkridge (then known as Elkridge Landing) as a southward extension of a road between Baltimore and Hanover, Pennsylvania. Passage across the then wider and deeper upper Patapsco River at Elkridge Landing was provided by Norwood's Ferry. In 1749, the road was blazed to Georgetown on the Potomac River via Waterloo, Laurel, and Bladensburg. The highway north of Baltimore was a road constructed in the second half of the 18th century to connect the port of Baltimore with farms in Baltimore and Harford counties in Maryland and in Lancaster and Chester counties in Pennsylvania. From the docks in Baltimore, the road passed through Harry Dorsey Gough's plantation at the Perry Hall Mansion (whence it was called "Gough's Road" or "Perry Hall Road" during this stretch) and Kingsville on its way to Bel Air. The highway headed east from Bel Air to Churchville, then north to a crossing of the Susquehanna River at Conowingo. The road continued east to Rising Sun, then turned north toward Oxford, Pennsylvania, where the highway connected with roads to Philadelphia.

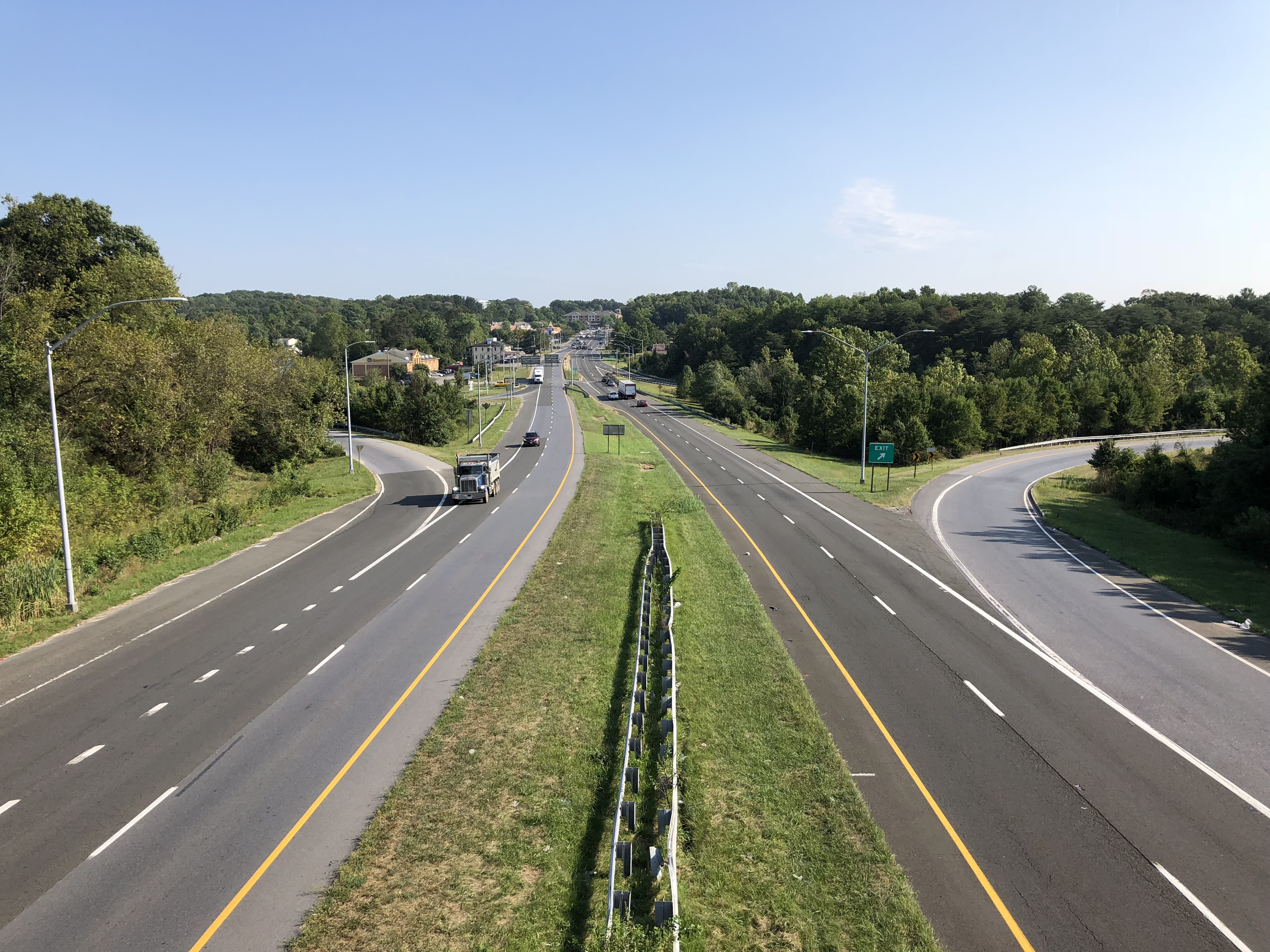
US 1 northbound at MD 32 in Howard County

In the early 19th century, many of these dirt roads were reconstructed as turnpikes. The Washington Turnpike was chartered in 1796, but no road building ever occurred. It was not until the Washington and Baltimore Turnpike was chartered in 1812 that construction began along a 60-foot (18 m) right-of-way between the corner of Pratt and Eutaw streets, then at the western city limits of Baltimore, southwest along the old dirt road to the District of Columbia boundary southwest of Bladensburg. In 1817, a timber toll bridge replaced Norwood's Ferry in Elkridge Landing. The Washington and Baltimore Turnpike had its chartered revoked in 1865 and the highway was turned over to the supervision of the counties. The toll bridge at Elkridge was sold to the counties in 1869.

By 1825, a turnpike existed from Baltimore northeast toward Bel Air. The Bel Air Turnpike was constructed from the Baltimore city line of 1818 at the corner of North Avenue and North Gay Street through Perry Hall and Kingsville to a junction with the Harford Turnpike at Benson in Harford County. From Benson, the Bel Air Turnpike of Harford County continued east to Main Street in Bel Air. North of Bel Air, what is now US 1 followed county highways to the Conowingo Bridge, which was first constructed around 1820.

=== Construction and reconstruction of State Road No. 1 ===
By the beginning of the 20th century, county maintenance of the corridor that would become US 1 was becoming inadequate for the increasing amount of traffic using the roads and becoming unacceptable to advocates of better roads. As a result, the Maryland General Assembly passed the first state-aid road construction law in 1904, providing matching funds from the state to the counties to surface their major highways. As the most important corridor in the state, much of the state-aid money in the relevant counties went to the road from Baltimore to Washington DC. Feeling the work done by the counties with state funds was inadequate, in 1906, the general assembly further appropriated a total of $90,000 (equivalent to $24.1 million in 2025)—$30,000 each in 1906, 1907, and 1908 (equivalent to $8.04 million, $7.56 million, and $7.57 million in 2025)—toward reconstruction of the Baltimore–Washington Boulevard. The 30-mile (48 km) road between the city limits of Washington DC and Baltimore was officially designated State Route No. 1. Another $174,000 (equivalent to $4.39 million in 2025) was appropriated by the state legislature in 1908. The 1908 act contained stipulations requiring a realignment of the road between Beltsville and Contee to eliminate two grade crossings of the Baltimore and Ohio Railroad as well as grade separations with the railroad at Elkridge and Mount Winans.

By 1910, the Baltimore–Washington Boulevard was paved from the District of Columbia boundary southwest of Bladensburg north to Beltsville, with small gaps at Northeast Branch south of Hyattsville and at Paint Branch in College Park; from Contee to Elkridge; and from Hammonds Ferry Road in Halethorpe to the Baltimore city line at Gwynns Falls. The general assembly appropriated another $120,000 (equivalent to $2.99 million in 2025) in 1910 for the newly formed two year old Maryland State Roads Commission (SRC) to complete the Baltimore–Washington Boulevard. By 1915, State Route No. 1 was completely paved with the addition of the highway on a new alignment between Beltsville and Contee, the filling of the gaps in College Park and Hyattsville, and construction between Elkridge and Halethorpe. The road was constructed a minimum of 14 feet (4.3 m) in width with macadam, gravel, and concrete, with curves straightened and grades reduced. Concrete sections in Laurel, College Park, and Bladensburg were among the first concrete roads in Maryland when they were poured in 1912. Concrete girder bridges were built at Northeast Branch and the Anacostia River in Bladensburg. A concrete bridge was built over the Patapsco River at Elkridge to replace an earlier iron bridge. Due to heavy traffic and inadequate initial construction, many of the sections constructed in the first few years of state aid had to be later rebuilt.

The barrage of heavy military vehicles that traveled the Baltimore–Washington Boulevard during World War I, as well as the severe winter of 1917–1918, devastated the highway. As a result, in 1918 and 1919, the highway was reconstructed from end to end. Some sections of the highway were completely rebuilt with concrete, while, along 18 miles (29 km) of the road, concrete shoulders, among the first applied in Maryland, were added to both widen and strengthen the road. By 1919, the entire length of the Baltimore–Washington Boulevard was a minimum width of 20 feet (6.1 m). The only significant realignment during this reconstruction was the straightening out of Dead Man's Curve 0.5 miles (0.80 km) south of Elkridge.

=== Construction north of Baltimore ===
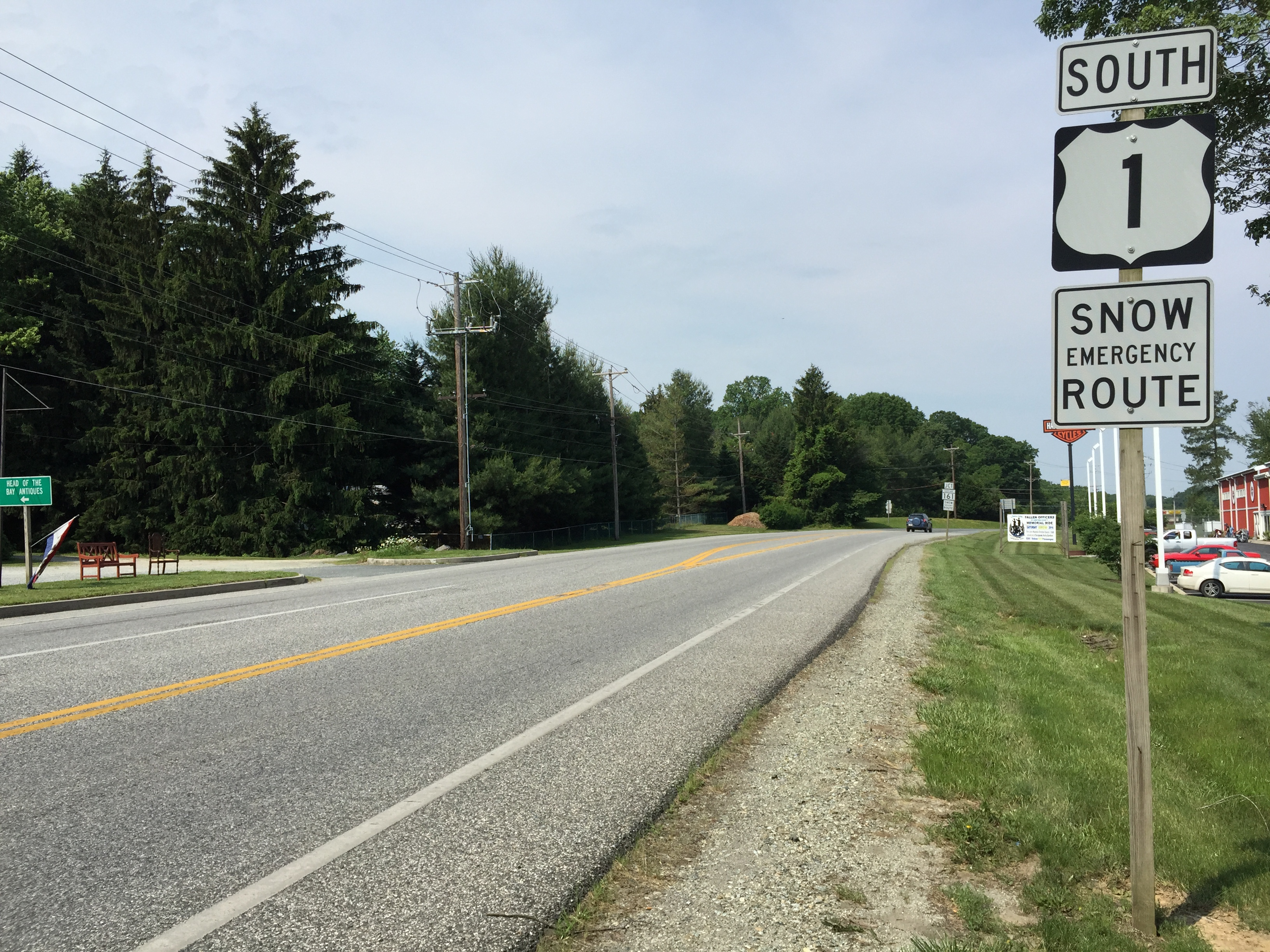
US 1 southbound past the intersection with MD 623 in Darlington

All of present-day US 1 north of Baltimore, with the exception of the road from east of Rising Sun to the Pennsylvania state line, was designated one of the original state roads by the SRC in 1909. By 1910, the highway was paved from Bel Air to Kalmia. In 1910, the SRC purchased the Bel Air Turnpike, the Bel Air Turnpike of Harford County, and Conowingo Bridge from their private operators. The SRC also paved its first section of the road from Oakwood to the crossing of Octoraro Creek that year. The road from Rising Sun to Sylmar Road was completed in 1911, along with Bel Air Road from the Baltimore city limits to Franklin Avenue. The paved section along Bel Air Road was extended northeast to Hamilton Avenue in 1912. That year also saw the first paving in Harford County from Kalmia to Deer Creek. The remainder of the highway in Harford County—from Little Gunpowder Falls to Bel Air and from Deer Creek to the Conowingo Bridge—was completed in 1913. Bel Air Road was finished in Baltimore County in 1914 and was paved from North Avenue to the Baltimore city limits, then just north of Erdman Avenue, in 1915. The highway was paved between the Conowingo Bridge and Oakwood in 1914. The state road was constructed along the alignment of the turnpikes without digression except for a relocation at Gunpowder Falls to reduce the grades on the hills. The final sections of what was to become US 1 were paved in Cecil County between 1917 and 1921, when the gap between Octoraro Creek and Rising Sun was filled and the Sylmar Road link from east of Rising Sun to the Pennsylvania state line was paved.

=== U.S. Route designation ===
When US 1 was designated in 1927, its route through Baltimore was the same as it is today except the federal highway entered the city from the southwest along Washington Boulevard. The highway turned north onto Monroe Street, which it followed to its present course north of Wilkens Avenue. This effectively replaced several auto trails that had been signed along the route. North of Baltimore, the road had been signed as the Baltimore PIke; south of there, it was part of a feeder route for the Lincoln Highway. South of Bel Air, the road was part of the Capitol Highway, connecting Washington DC to Philadelphia and Atlanta.

=== Reconstruction north of Baltimore ===
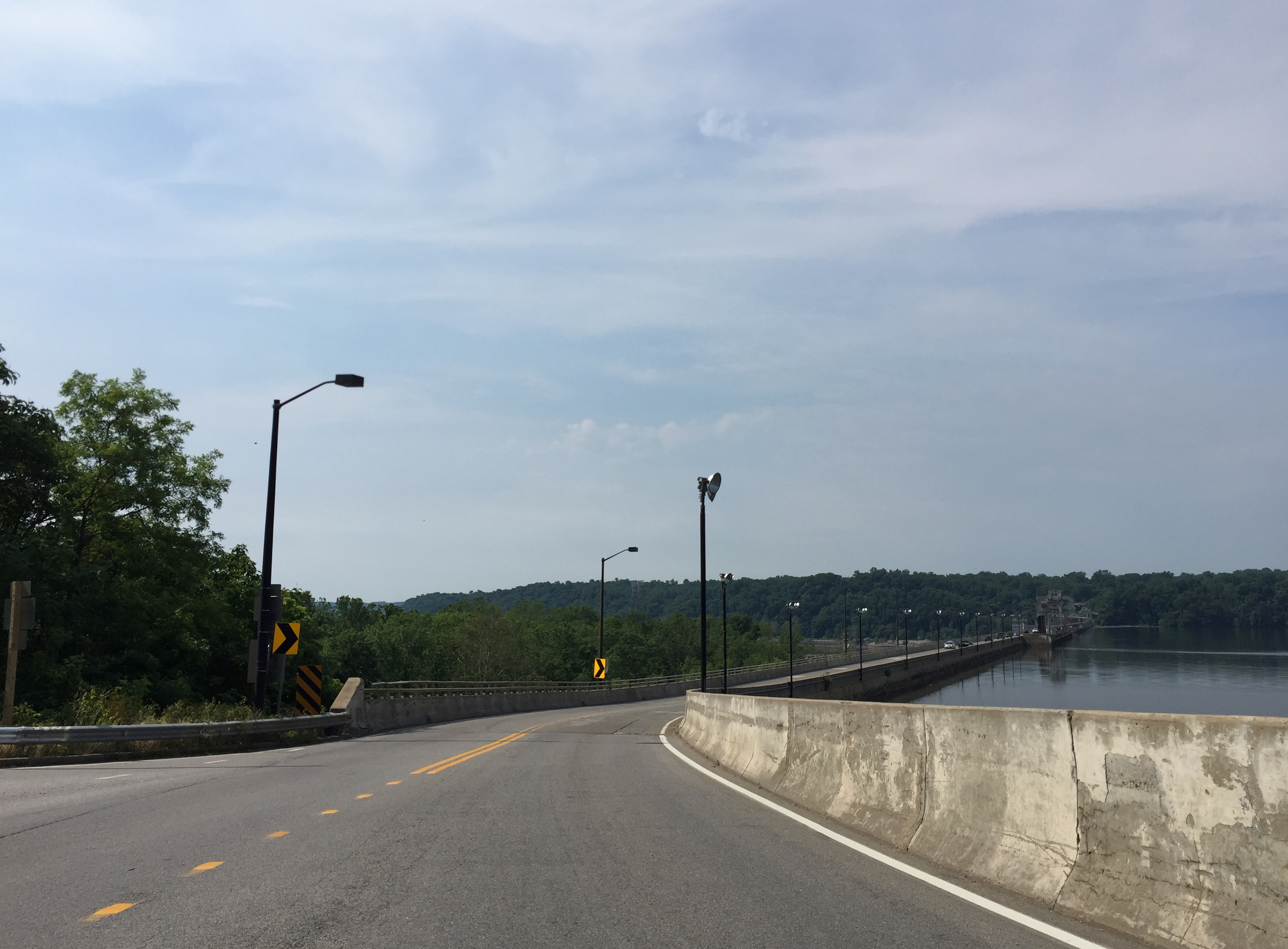
US 1 southbound crossing the Susquehanna River on the Conowingo Dam

US 1's first major relocation north of Baltimore occurred at the Susquehanna River. The Conowingo Bridge was removed before it could be inundated by the Conowingo Reservoir set to fill upon the completion of Conowingo Dam in 1928. The old approaches, which consisted of Smith Road from near Darlington to Glen Cove on the west side of the river and Connelly Road, Ragan Road, and Old Conowingo Road to the mouth of Conowingo Creek on the east side of the river, were replaced with the present highway between Smith Road and Connelly Road. Smith Road was redesignated MD 162, while the eastern approach became a western extension of MD 273.

US 1 saw three realignments north of Baltimore in 1934. A three-mile (4.8 km) relocation near Kalmia included a new bridge over Deer Creek. The old highway, which featured 26 curves, was designated MD 590. Another relocation occurred between Conowingo and Rising Sun, featuring a new bridge over Octoraro Creek. The old highway was designated MD 591. East of Rising Sun, a 90-degree turn was bypassed at the intersection of Telegraph Road (now MD 273) and Sylmar Road by the construction of a sweeping curve to the northwest of the intersection. The bypassed portion of Sylmar Road was designated MD 592.

Bel Air Road was expanded started in 1933. US 1 was widened to 40 feet (12 m) from the Baltimore city line northeast to Joppa Road. The highway was widened to 30 feet (9.1 m) from Joppa Road to Bel Air. The 30-foot (9.1 m) road was the first construction in Maryland of a three-lane road with center turn lane.

=== Baltimore–Washington Boulevard receives relief ===
Massive increases in traffic during the 1920s made the reconstruction of the late 1910s obsolete within the decade. Construction to expand the entire length of the Baltimore–Washington Boulevard with two 10-foot (3.0 m) shoulders to 40 feet (12 m) in width, allowing for four lanes, began in 1928. The final sections of the expanded highway, between the District of Columbia line and Bladensburg and a bypass to the west of Elkridge and over the upper Patapsco River, including the present underpass of the Baltimore and Ohio Railroad, were completed in 1931. The old colonial era Main Street through Elkridge was designated as MD 477.

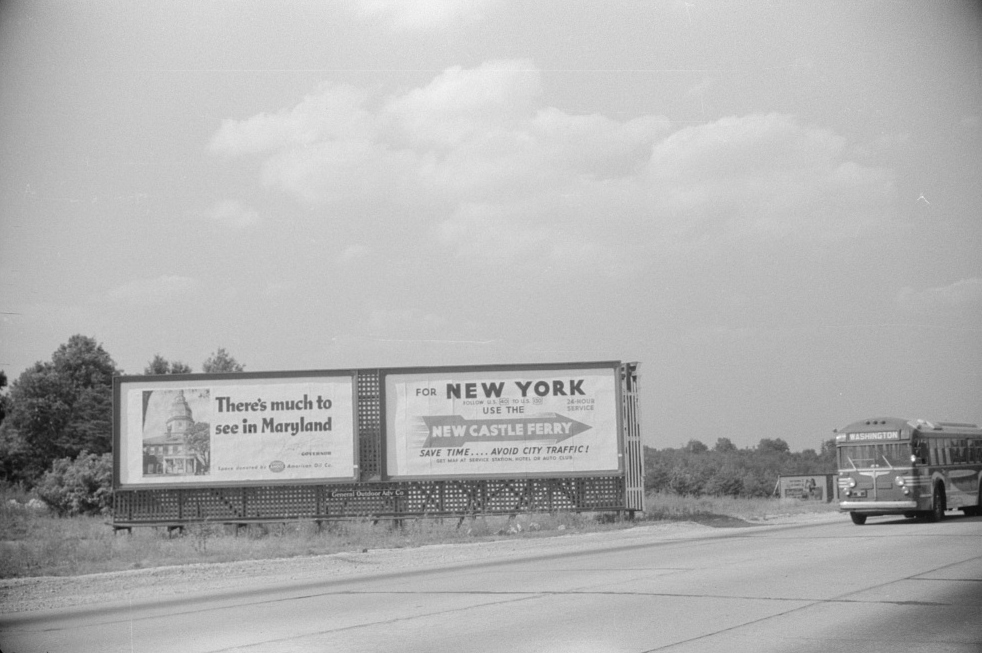
US 1 near Laurel in 1940

Despite the widening of US 1 between Baltimore and Washington DC in the late 1920s, the highway continued to be a major problem for both local and through traffic. The very high traffic levels made the highway a very attractive location for businesses serving travelers, leading to the sobriquet of "hot dog highway". The captive audience also led to the construction of over 1000 billboards between the two cities, spurring another nickname: "billboard boulevard". US 1 was also nicknamed "bloody Mary" due to the very high accident rate on the highway. After 1930, businesses were packed up to the edge of the four-lane, shoulder-less road that was largely built on an alignment poorly suited for the increasing speeds of vehicles. Thus, further expansion of the highway or safety improvements were impossible without expensive condemnation proceedings or relocating the highway. Businesses were adamantly against the latter solution.

In 1939, US 1's departure north from Washington Boulevard in Baltimore was moved south from Monroe Street to Caton Avenue just north of the city line. From Caton Avenue, US 1 followed Wilkens Avenue to Monroe Street. Caton and Wilkens avenues were expanded between 1936 and 1938, including removal of streetcar tracks and expansion to a divided boulevard on Wilkens Avenue, to handle the increased traffic as a "through-street". By 1946, a US 1 bypass was signed following Caton Avenue north from Wilkens Avenue, continuing on Hilton Street to North Avenue, then taking North Avenue east to rejoin US 1 at Monroe Street. Southwestern Boulevard was completed in 1950 as a dual highway through Arbutus, with grade separations with Sulphur Spring Road and Francis Avenue. US 1 was moved to its present alignment along that boulevard and Wilkens Avenue and old US 1 through Halethorpe was designated US 1 Alt.

During World War II, US 1 was relocated from Baltimore Avenue and Bladensburg Road between Washington DC and Hyattsville to Rhode Island Avenue, which was widened to 36 feet (11 m) in 1940. Rhode Island Avenue between Mount Rainier and Hyattsville had originally been MD 411. The old US 1 south of Hyattsville became US 1 Alt. Despite these relocations and upgrades, true relief did not come until the first limited-access highway between Baltimore and Washington DC, the B–W Parkway, was completed in 1954 to remove long-distance traffic from US 1. With the completion of that highway and later the Baltimore Harbor Tunnel Thruway (I-895) in 1957 and, later, I-95, US 1 between the two cities became a highway mainly for local traffic.

=== Recent improvements ===
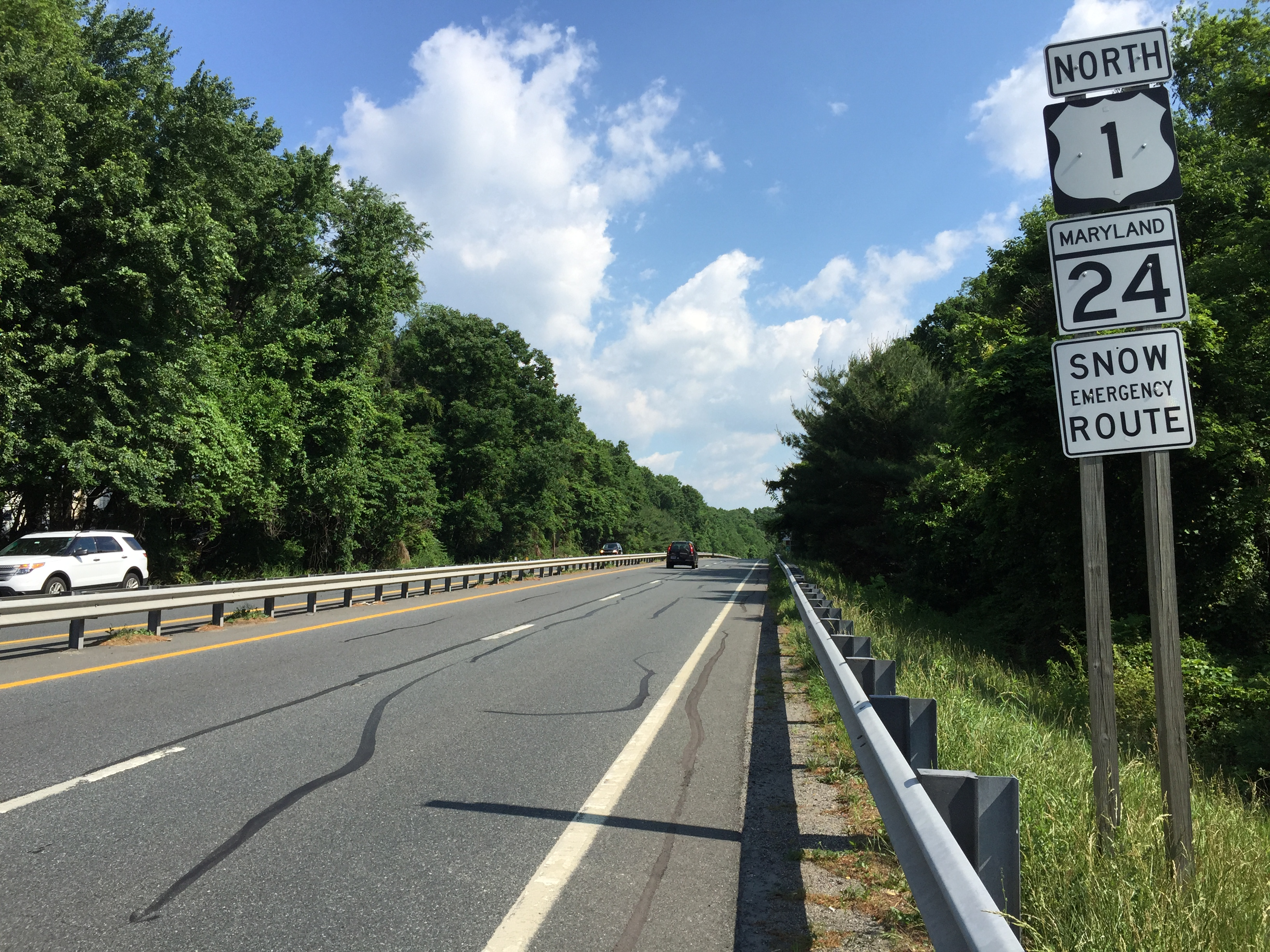
US 1 and MD 24 northbound on the Bel Air bypass

Dead Man's Curve was bypassed south of Elkridge in 1946. A bypass of Laurel was constructed around 1950. In 1952, northbound US 1 was placed on Fulton Avenue in West Baltimore opposite southbound US 1 on Monroe Street. North Avenue was widened to a divided highway for much of its US 1-designated length by 1957. By 1960, this bypass had become the northbound lanes of the present one-way pair. US 1 north of Baltimore was reconstructed to modify curves and widen the road in the 1950s. The highway was reconstructed in Cecil County from Conowingo Dam to Rising Sun in 1952 and 1953 and from Rising Sun to Sylmar in 1954. US 1 in Harford County was reconstructed from Little Gunpowder Falls to north of Deer Creek in 1952 and 1953 and to Conowingo Dam between 1954 and 1956. In Howard County, the highway was resurfaced from Elkridge to Waterloo in 1954 and from Waterloo to the Patuxent River in 1956. By 1958, US 1 was being widened from Laurel to Beltsville. The highway's bypass of Rising Sun was completed in 1957. MD 273 was extended west from Sylmar through Rising Sun along the old alignment to the southern end of the bypass. The Bel Air bypass was placed under construction in 1964 and completed in 1965, resulting in the designation of US 1 Bus. along the old road through Bel Air. The Bel Air bypass was extended north around Hickory in 2000, with US 1 Bus. extended to meet the northern end of the bypass.

== Junction list ==
County	Location	mi	km	Destinations	Notes
Prince George's	Mount Rainier	0.00	0.00	US 1 south (Rhode Island Avenue) / Eastern Avenue – Washington	Continuation into the District of Columbia
Prince George's	Brentwood	0.48	0.77	MD 208 (38th Street) – Colmar Manor, Cottage City, Hyattsville	
Prince George's	Hyattsville	1.82	2.93	US 1 Alt. south (Baltimore Avenue) – Bladensburg	Northern terminus of US 1 Alt.
Prince George's	Riverdale Park	2.61	4.20	MD 410 (East–West Highway) – New Carrollton, Takoma Park	Access to Riverdale station
Prince George's	College Park	4.33	6.97	Campus Drive (MD 431 south)	Northern terminus of unsigned MD 431
Prince George's	College Park	5.03	8.10	Greenbelt Road (MD 430 east) to MD 193 east – Greenbelt	Western terminus of unsigned MD 430
Prince George's	College Park	5.24	8.43	MD 193 west (University Boulevard) – UM Events	Partial cloverleaf interchange
Prince George's	College Park	6.43	10.35	I-95 / I-495 (Capital Beltway) – Baltimore, Silver Spring, Richmond VA, Andrews AFB	Exit 25 on I-95 / I-495
Prince George's	Beltsville	8.00	12.87	MD 212 (Powder Mill Road)	Access via MD 212A; southern terminus of MD 212 concurrency
Prince George's	Beltsville	9.87	15.88	MD 212 west (Ritz Way) – Calverton	Northern terminus of MD 212 concurrency. also serves Muirkirk Road and Muirkirk station
Prince George's	Beltsville	10.38	16.70	MD 200 Toll west (Intercounty Connector) to I-95 / I-270	E-ZPass or Video Tolling
Prince George's	Laurel	13.49	21.71	MD 198 east (Gorman Avenue/Fort Meade Road) – Fort Meade	
Prince George's	Laurel	13.58	21.85	MD 198 west (Talbott Avenue) – Burtonsville	
Prince George's	Laurel	13.99	22.51	Main Street	Unsigned Main Street MD 979 between the one-way pair; to Laurel station
Howard	Savage	16.97	27.31	MD 32 (Patuxent Freeway) – Columbia, Fort Meade	Exit 12 on MD 32
Howard	Jessup	19.72	31.74	MD 175 (Waterloo Road) to I-95 – Columbia, Fort Meade	To Jessup station
Howard	Elkridge	21.17	34.07	MD 103 (Dorsey Road east / Meadowridge Road west)	To Dorsey station
Howard	Elkridge	21.68	34.89	MD 100 – Ellicott City, Glen Burnie	Exit 6 on MD 100
Howard	Elkridge	25.01	40.25	I-895 Toll north (Harbor Tunnel Thruway)	Exit 1 on I-895; northbound exit to I-895 north and southbound entrance from I-895 south
Baltimore	Arbutus	25.44	40.94	I-195 (Metropolitan Boulevard) to I-95 – BWI Airport, Catonsville	Exit 3 on I-195
Baltimore	Arbutus	26.02	41.88	US 1 Alt. north (Washington Boulevard) to I-695 – Halethorpe	Southern terminus of US 1 Alt.; northbound exit and southbound entrance; to Halethorpe station
Baltimore	Arbutus	28.06	45.16	I-695 west (Baltimore Beltway) – Towson	Access via Leeds Avenue; direct ramp planned from US 1 to westbound I-695
Baltimore City		29.18	46.96	MD 372 west (Wilkens Avenue)	Eastern terminus of MD 372; US 1 turns east onto Wilkens Avenue
Baltimore City		29.77	47.91	US 1 Alt. south (Caton Avenue) to I-95 / Caton Avenue north	Northern terminus of US 1 Alt.
Baltimore City		31.24	50.28	Monroe Street	South end of one-way pair; Monroe Street north of the intersection is southbound US 1
Baltimore City		31.59	50.84	MD 144 west (Lombard Street) / Lombard Street east	Eastern terminus of MD 144
Baltimore City		32.06	51.60	Mulberry Street east to US 40 east	One-way eastbound
Baltimore City		32.13	51.71	Franklin Street west to US 40 west	One-way westbound; to West Baltimore station
Baltimore City		33.24	53.49	US 40 Truck west (North Avenue) / MD 140 north (Fulton Avenue)	Southern terminus of US 40 Truck concurrency; southern terminus of MD 140; north end of one-way pair; US 1 turns east onto North Avenue
Baltimore City		33.67	54.19	MD 129 south (Druid Hill Avenue)	
Baltimore City		33.74	54.30	MD 129 north (McCulloh Street)	
Baltimore City		34.39	55.35	I-83 (Jones Falls Expressway) / Mount Royal Avenue south – Downtown	Exit 6 on I-83
Baltimore City		34.85	56.09	MD 139 north (Charles Street)	One-way northbound; southern terminus of MD 139;
Baltimore City		34.94	56.23	MD 2 south (St. Paul Street)	One-way southbound; northern terminus of MD 2; to Penn Station
Baltimore City		35.23	56.70	MD 45 north (Greenmount Avenue) / Greenmount Avenue south	Southern terminus of MD 45
Baltimore City		35.79	57.60	MD 147 north (Harford Road)	Southern terminus of MD 147
Baltimore City		37.46	60.29	US 40 Truck east / MD 151 south (Erdman Avenue) / Erdman Avenue north	North end of concurrency with US 40 Truck; northern terminus of MD 151
Baltimore	Overlea	42.13	67.80	I-695 (Baltimore Beltway) – Towson, Essex	Exit 32 on I-695
Baltimore	Overlea	43.11	69.38	MD 43 (White Marsh Boulevard) to I-695 west – White Marsh	Southbound Right-in/right-out interchange
Baltimore	Overlea	43.37	69.80	MD 43 (White Marsh Boulevard) – White Marsh / Dunfield Road west	Northbound access only
Harford	Pleasant Hills	53.00	85.30	MD 152 (Mountain Road) – Fallston, Joppatowne	
Harford	Pleasant Hills	54.32	87.42	US 1 Bus. north (Bel Air Road) / MD 147 west (Harford Road) – Bel Air, Parkville	Southern terminus of US 1 Bus.; northern terminus of MD 147
Harford	Bel Air	56.26	90.54	MD 24 south (Vietnam Veterans Memorial Highway) to I-95 – Bel Air, Edgewood	Southern terminus of MD 24 concurrency
Harford	Bel Air	57.80	93.02	MD 24 north / MD 924 south (Rock Spring Road) – Bel Air, Forest Hill	Partial cloverleaf interchange; northern terminus of MD 24 concurrency; northern terminus of MD 924
Harford	Bel Air	58.90	94.79	US 1 Bus. (Conowingo Road) – Bel Air	
Harford	Hickory	59.17	95.22	MD 23 west (East–West Highway) – Forest Hill	Eastern terminus of MD 23
Harford	Hickory	59.75	96.16	MD 543 (Ady Road) – Churchville, Pylesville	
Harford	Hickory	60.26	96.98	US 1 Bus. south (Conowingo Road) – Hickory	Northern terminus of US 1 Bus.
Harford	Dublin	65.79	105.88	MD 136 (Priestford Road/Whiteford Road) – Churchville, Whiteford	
Harford	Dublin	67.85	109.19	MD 440 west (Dublin Road)	Eastern terminus of MD 440
Harford	Darlington	69.49	111.83	MD 161 south (Main Street) – Havre de Grace	Northern terminus of MD 161
Harford	Darlington	69.67	112.12	MD 623 (Castleton Road) – Castleton	
Susquehanna River		71.27– 72.08	114.70– 116.00	Conowingo Dam	
Cecil	Conowingo	72.08	116.00	MD 222 south (Susquehanna River Road) – Port Deposit	Northern terminus of MD 222
Cecil	Conowingo	73.06	117.58	US 222 north (Rock Springs Road) / Rowlandsville Road south – Lancaster	Southern terminus of US 222
Cecil		74.67	120.17	MD 591 north (Colora Road)	Access via MD 591A; southern terminus of MD 591
Cecil		75.73	121.88	MD 591 south (Porters Bridge Road)	Access via MD 591B; northern terminus of MD 591
Cecil	Harrisville	76.83– 77.04	123.65– 123.98	MD 273 east (Rising Sun Road) – Rising Sun, Newark	Western terminus of MD 273; northbound ramp is unsigned MD 273A
Cecil	Harrisville	77.73	125.09	MD 276 south (Jacob Tome Memorial Highway) to I-95 / US 40 – Rising Sun	Northern terminus of MD 276
Cecil		80.86	130.13	US 1 north (Kennett–Oxford Bypass) – Oxford, Philadelphia	Continuation into Pennsylvania
1.000 mi = 1.609 km; 1.000 km = 0.621 mi: Concurrency terminus; Electronic toll collection; Incomplete access

== See also ==
U.S. Route 1
Previous state: District of Columbia	Maryland	Next state: Pennsylvania
