= Broad Creek Soapstone Quarries =

- U.S. National Register of Historic Places
- Location: Robinson Mill Road, Dublin, Maryland
- Area: 8 acres (3.2 ha)
- NRHP reference No.: 75000903
- Added to NRHP: May 12, 1975

The Broad Creek Soapstone Quarries, also known as Orr Prehistoric Steatite Quarry Archeological Site, is an archeological site located near Dublin, just south of Whiteford, Harford County, Maryland. The site includes evidence of the manufacture of vessels from boulders instead of from bedrock. This activity dated from 1700 to 1000 B.C.

It was listed on the National Register of Historic Places in 1975.
