= Fountain Green, Maryland =

Unincorporated community in Maryland, United States

- Unincorporated community
- Location within Maryland Location within the United States
- Coordinates: 39°32′50″N 76°18′49″W
- Country: United States
- State: Maryland
- County: Harford
- Elevation: 344 ft (105 m)
- Time zone: UTC-5 (Eastern (EST))
  - Summer (DST): UTC-4 (EDT)
- Area codes: 410 & 443
- GNIS feature ID: 584465

Fountain Green is an unincorporated community in Harford County, Maryland, United States. Fountain Green is located at the junction of Maryland routes 22 and 543, 2 miles (3.2 km) east-northeast of Bel Air.
