= Broad Creek (Susquehanna River tributary) =

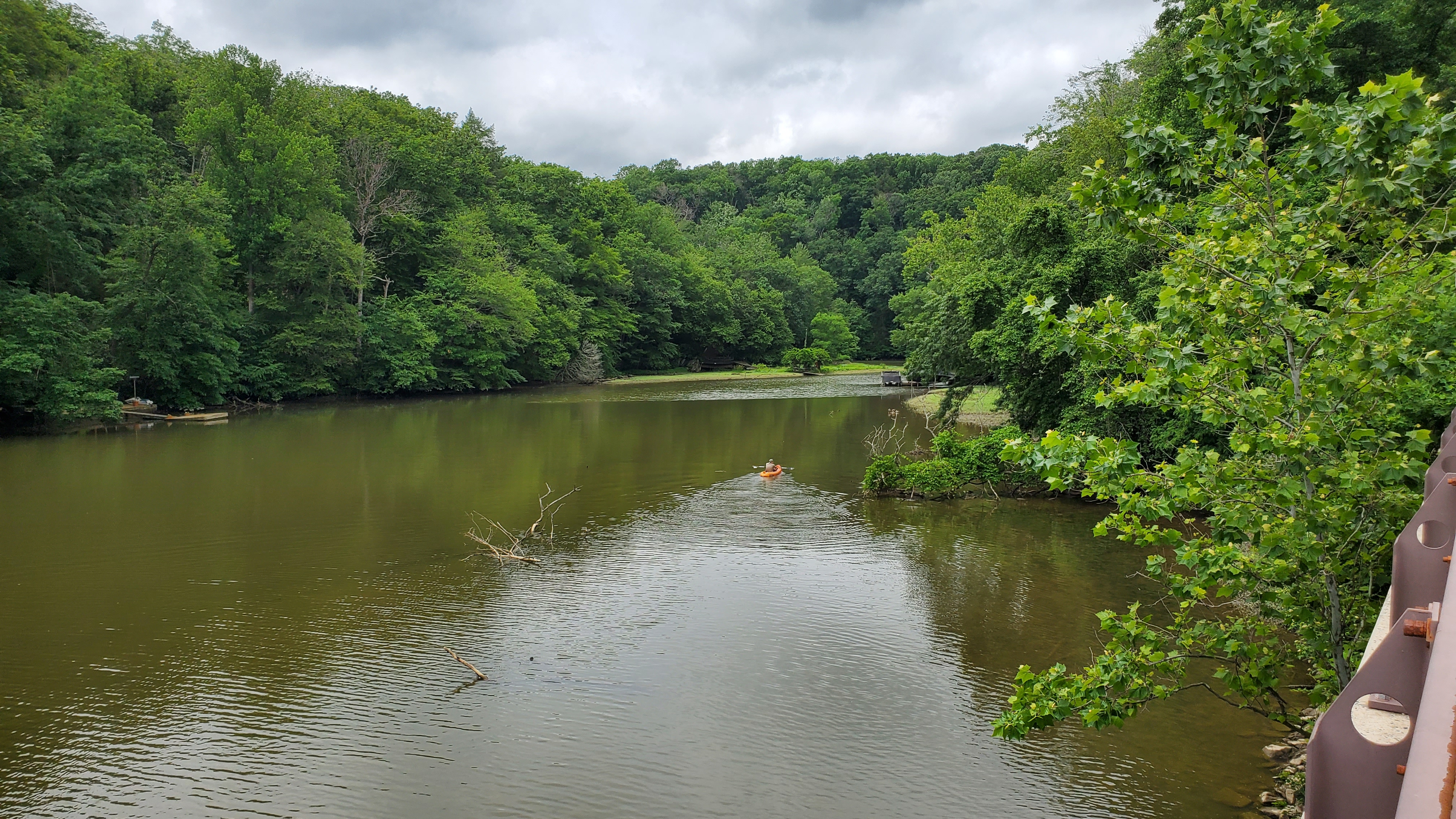

Location
- Country: United States
- State: Maryland
- Region: Harford County

Physical characteristics
- Source: near Pennsylvania state line
  - coordinates: 39.719827°N 76.419962°W
  - elevation: 650 ft (200 m)
- Mouth: Conowingo Reservoir (Susquehanna River)
  - coordinates: 39.698994°N 76.237178°W
  - elevation: 108 ft (33 m)
- Length: 17 mi (27 km)
- Basin size: 40.6 mi^{2} (105 km^{2})

Basin features
- Tributaries
  - left: Carr Run, Deep Run
  - right: Jacks Hole

Broad Creek is a tributary of the lower Susquehanna River located in Harford County, Maryland.

Broad Creek originates on the west side of Constitution Road about 500 feet south of the Pennsylvania state line. It runs generally southeast through Pylesville, Maryland for the first half, then northeast for the second half of its 17 miles (27 km) to the Conowingo Reservoir portion of the Susquehanna.

It flows through just two properties in its lower five miles, that of the Baltimore Area Council, B.S.A. and then the Exelon power company. In its three-mile course through Broad Creek Memorial Scout Reservation, it was dammed to create Lake Aaron Straus and passes close to the Late Archaic Period Broad Creek Soapstone Quarries archaeological site. Downstream from the 1948 Boy Scout dam, the creek forms a noteworthy gorge through the largest and oldest eastern hemlock grove in the state east of the Allegheny Front. At the east edge of the reservation, about two miles from its mouth, the creek meets the headwaters of the reservoir.

The watershed is 40.6 square miles (105 km^{2}), all in Harford County except for three small areas in York County, Pennsylvania about two miles east of Fawn Grove, 1.5 miles northwest of Whiteford, Maryland, and the southeast part of Delta. Principal land uses in the watershed are agriculture and forest.

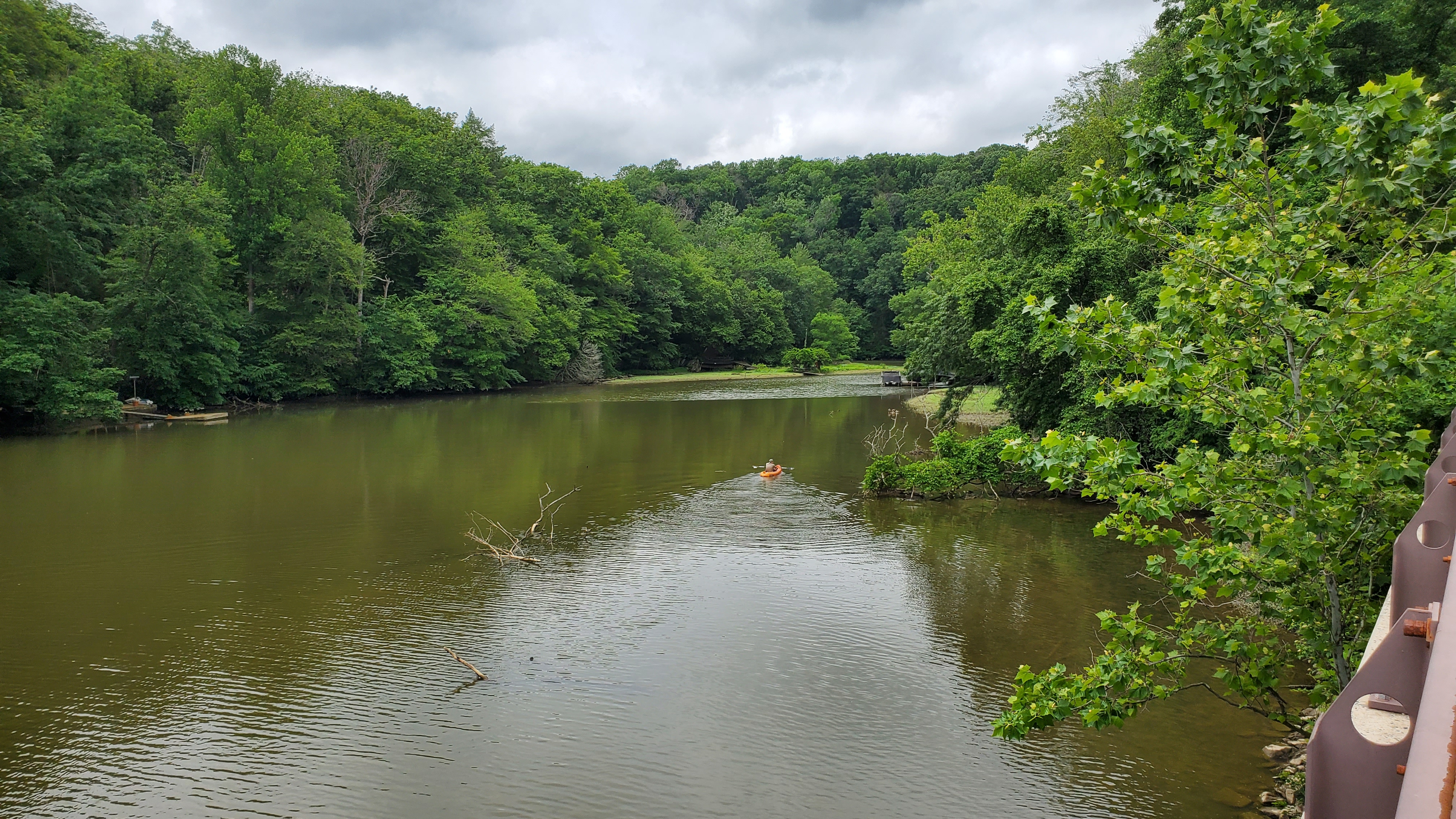
Looking west and upstream from the Route 623 bridge (Flintville Road)

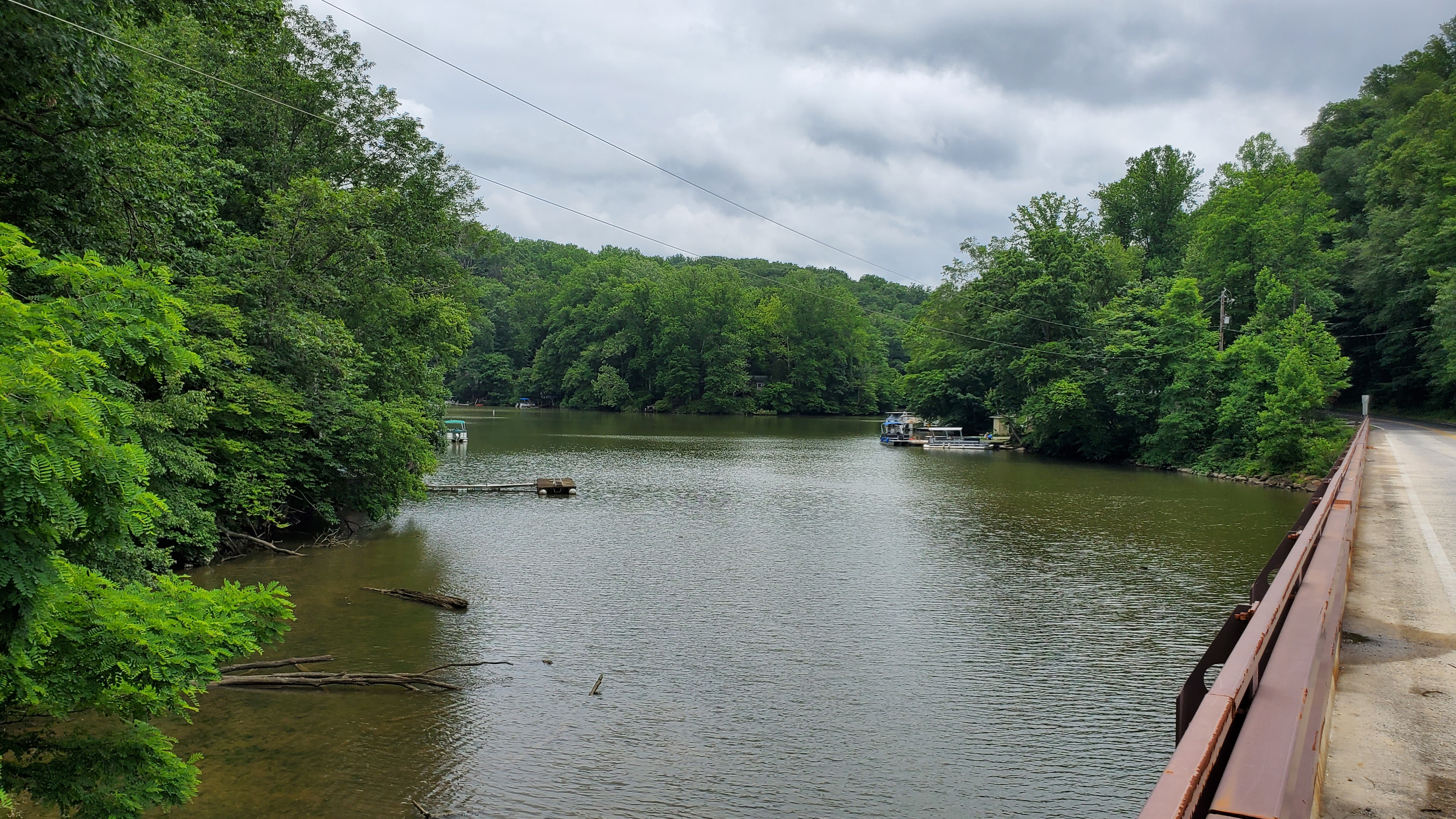
Looking east and downstream from same bridge
