= Riverside, Harford County, Maryland =

- Census-designated place
- Coordinates: 39°28′35″N 76°14′42″W
- Country: United States
- State: Maryland
- County: Harford

Area
  - Total: 2.62 sq mi (6.78 km^{2})
  - Land: 2.61 sq mi (6.77 km^{2})
  - Water: 0.0039 sq mi (0.01 km^{2})
- Elevation: 79 ft (24 m)

Population (2020)
  - Total: 7,021
  - Density: 2,686.5/sq mi (1,037.25/km^{2})
- Time zone: UTC−5 (Eastern (EST))
  - Summer (DST): UTC−4 (EDT)
- ZIP code: 21017
- Area code: 410
- FIPS code: 24-66762
- GNIS feature ID: 1698813

Riverside is a census-designated place (CDP) in Harford County, Maryland, United States. The population was 6,425 at the 2010 census. The term "Riverside" is generally used interchangeably with "Belcamp"; both names are accepted for the U.S. Postal Service's ZIP Code of 21017. However, the original community of Belcamp is located south of U.S. Route 40, outside the Riverside CDP.

== Geography ==
Riverside is located at 39°28′35″N 76°14′42″W (39.476385, −76.244943). It is bordered to the north by Maryland Route 7 (Philadelphia Road) and to the south by U.S. Route 40 (Pulaski Highway). It extends west to the Bush River and James Run, and to the east it reaches to Grays Run. Maryland Route 543 (Riverside Parkway) passes through the center of the CDP, crossing Route 7 and ending at US 40. Just north of the CDP, MD 543 crosses Interstate 95 at Exit 80. I-95 leads southwest 30 miles (48 km) to Baltimore and northeast 45 miles (72 km) to Wilmington, Delaware. Bel Air, the Harford County seat, is 8 miles (13 km) northwest of Riverside via MD 543.

According to the United States Census Bureau, the Riverside CDP has a total area of 2.4 square miles (6.1 km^{2}), of which 0.01 square miles (0.03 km^{2}), or 0.48%, is water.

== Commerce ==
One of the major revenue sources in Riverside is derived from its location, connecting Route 40 with Interstate 95 via Route 543. Hence, many of the commercial establishments in this area are designed for long-distance drivers. These include four hotels and four gas stations/convenience stores. All commercially zoned property is located off Route 543, also known as the Riverside Parkway.

The Riverside area also includes multiple business parks, among which is a major industrial park that features numerous corporations and business offices such as Northrop Grumman. Mercedes-Benz had a manufacturing building at one time, but that is now closed and the building is for sale. A business park built on Route 40 at the former site of the Bata Shoes factory opened in 2000 and originally provided offices for Clark Turner Signature Homes and SURVICE Engineering. Expansion to the business park has brought in Booz Allen Hamilton and SafeNet.

== Demographics ==
Historical population
Census	Pop.	Note	%±
2000	6,128		—
2010	6,425		4.8%
2020	7,021		9.3%
U.S. Decennial Census

As of the census of 2000, there were 6,128 people, 2,322 households, and 1,569 families residing in the CDP. The population density was 2,541.0 inhabitants per square mile (981.1/km^{2}). There were 2,466 housing units at an average density of 1,022.5 per square mile (394.8/km^{2}). The racial makeup of the CDP was 79.62% White, 15.19% African American, 0.39% Native American, 1.58% Asian, 0.05% Pacific Islander, 1.17% from other races, and 1.99% from two or more races. Hispanic or Latino of any race were 3.21% of the population.

There were 2,322 households, out of which 40.9% had children under the age of 18 living with them, 53.9% were married couples living together, 10.4% had a female householder with no husband present, and 32.4% were non-families. 24.1% of all households were made up of individuals, and 2.3% had someone living alone who was 65 years of age or older. The average household size was 2.59 and the average family size was 3.12.

In the CDP, the population was spread out, with 29.0% under the age of 18, 6.9% from 18 to 24, 43.9% from 25 to 44, 15.5% from 45 to 64, and 4.7% who were 65 years of age or older. The median age was 31 years. For every 100 females, there were 92.0 males. For every 100 females age 18 and over, there were 89.5 males.

The median income for a household in the CDP was $57,641, and the median income for a family was $60,088. Males had a median income of $40,750 versus $31,600 for females. The per capita income for the CDP was $23,158. About 1.6% of families and 3.3% of the population were below the poverty line, including 2.1% of those under age 18 and 3.3% of those age 65 or over.
