= Masons, Maryland =

Unincorporated community in Maryland, United States

- Unincorporated community
- Location within the state of Maryland Masons (the United States)
- Coordinates: 38°33′33″N 76°48′01″W
- Country: United States
- State: Maryland
- County: Charles
- Time zone: UTC-5 (Eastern (EST))
  - Summer (DST): UTC-4 (EDT)

Masons is an unincorporated community in Charles County, Maryland, United States.
