= Dublin, Maryland =

Unincorporated community in Maryland, U.S.

Coordinates: 39°39′03″N 76°16′00″W

Dublin is an unincorporated community in Harford County, Maryland, United States. Dublin was founded in the early 19th century by George McCausland and a friend who migrated from Dublin, Ireland.

== History ==
The first record of the village of Dublin is found in the Act of Assembly Districts of the 18th century, which divided the county into election districts and designated Dublin the vote place for the Fifth district. Martenet's map of 1878 shows McCausland built a home on one side of what is now Route 440 and a tavern or inn on the other side. The tavern on the southeast side was a long two-story building that was close to the road. The building had a porch on the first and second stories.

In old records, reference is made of the Mt. Ararat Lodge of Masons, Maryland, which moved its meeting place in 1809 from a tavern in Delta, Pennsylvania to George McCausland's tavern in Dublin. The lodge remained there until 1826, then moved to the old Masonic Lodge on Bond Street in Bel Air.

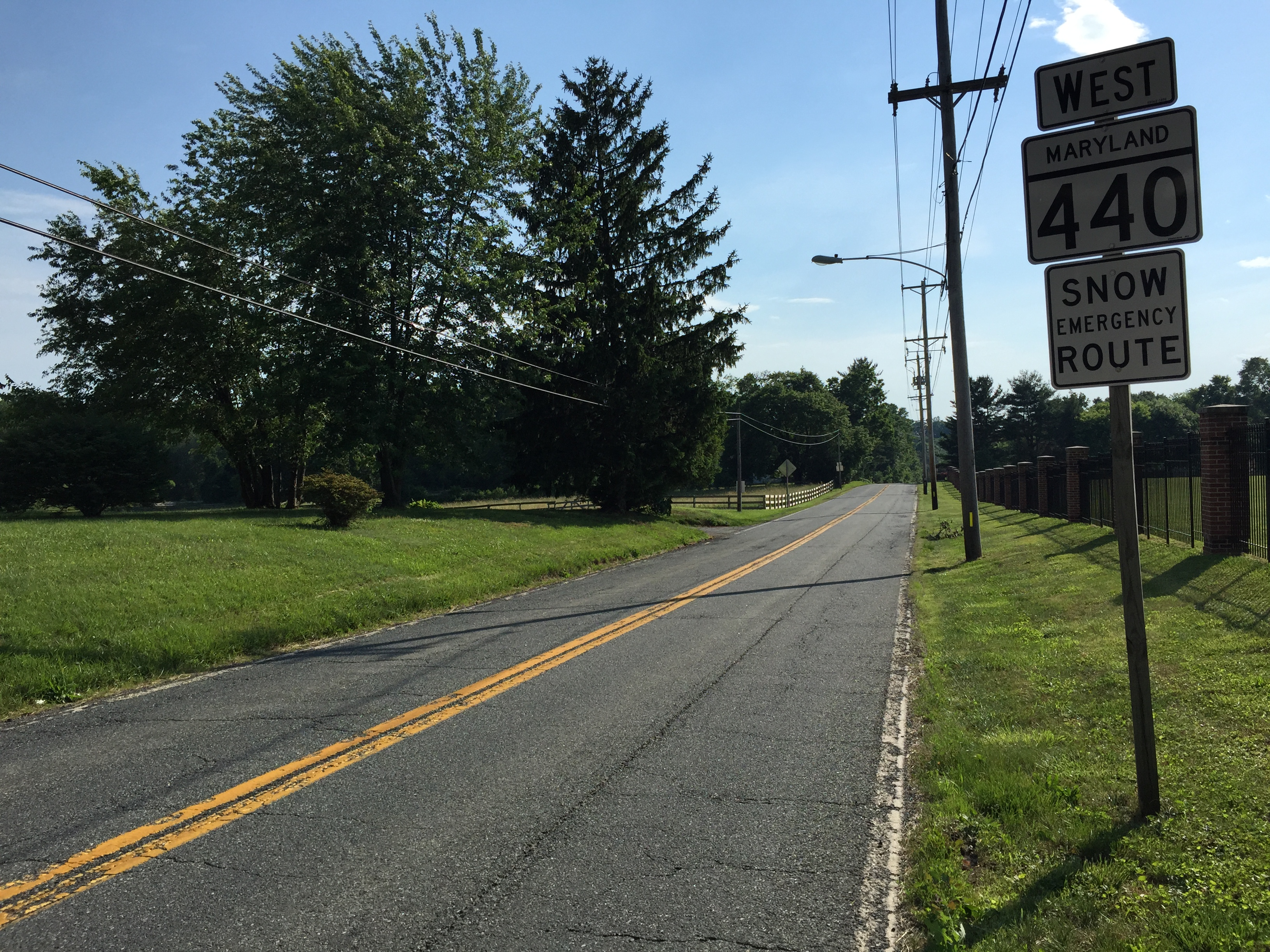
Roadside scene in Dublin

On the northeast corner of Routes 440 and 136 was a small log house, with a short circular stairway and a fireplace, which was used as a school and referred to as "the academy". Along with several of the older homes, it burned in 1971.

In 1858, the town had ten houses and places of business. Among the owners were McComas, Gallion, James, Rausey, J. Dougherty, and Jones. Dublin had a post office in 1878, one of the first in Harford County. At that time, the town boasted two stores, a blacksmith shop, a wheelwright shop, a church, a school, and two taverns. Dublin school was a part of the public school system in 1867 with a one-room building on present-day Route 136 across from the present school.

In 1800, Charles Beavers donated land for a Methodist house of worship (on present-day Route 136). A log structure was first erected and later a clapboard one-room was built which served the congregation until 1939. The Methodist bishop sent a deacon to start a church in Dublin. The deacon was visiting Bush Chapel, on the Bush River, and traveled through Dublin to the Greenstone area, now on Baltimore Boy Scout land off Peach Orchard Road. That area was well populated with strong Methodists and also by being on the river and several mining ore mills. The area was thickly settled. Several stones can be seen which are believed to be part of the foundation the deacon started. He never returned and, in later years, a church was started in Dublin.

Dublin has long been known for the incident of "The Headless Peddler". This occurred in 1763 on John Bryarly's farm on a stream called Rock Run. After this event, the stream name was changed to Peddler's Run. The end of the story was only closed in 1843, on James Warner's farm. The road, now Route 440 through Dublin, was known as Dublin-Stafford Road. This was the main road to Bel Air and the Susquehanna River where the commercial life was. The travel pattern of the county was from Bush River up to Churchville, into Dublin and to the Susquehanna River; there was no Route 1 until later years.

Dublin has two old cemeteries, a north and a south. The South Cemetery is on Deerfield Road. At one time a small church was erected there for the slaves and Southern sympathizers. You can still make out the foundation lines of the church. The oldest tombstone is dated 1820, though possibly there are older unmarked slaves' graves.

The other cemetery is with the Dublin United Methodist Church on Route 136. On the Martenets' map of 1858, the village was not spread out but in a small area. The Indians had mostly vacated this area by the 18th century but they had left the land poor and barren for crops. The area was known as Arabin Petra, a tract of approximately 5,000 acres (2,000 ha) (or hundredth as was used in those days). This land was originally acquired by Dr. Charles Carroll.

Usually, when a settlement was made of a town, the first three things established were a church, a school, and a jail. There is no record of a jail for Dublin. But the local story goes that if you did not live in Dublin, you better have your business in town settled by dark or else the locals would "send you packin'".

== Land area ==
Dublin was part of a 4,735-acre (19.16 km^{2}) tract of land patented to Dr. Charles Carroll of Annapolis, Maryland. He was issued a patented certificate on June 15, 1721. The tract lying north of Deer Creek was known as "Arabia Petrea".

Dr. Carroll sold "Arabia Petrea" to Jacob Giles and Isaac Webster in 1733. Isaac and Jacob were brothers-in-law. Isaac and Jacob in turn sold off part to new settlers moving into the area. Two of the newcomers in Dublin were William Beaver and Walter Ashmore. Isaac and Giles sold lands east of Route 136 to Walter Ashmore and land west of Route 136 to William Beaver. William Beaver willed his land to his son Charles Beaver.

In 1796, Charles petitioned the court to have appointed commissioners "mark and bound" his land. The first stone was set November 8, 1796 with a "B" carved in the face. After more than 200 years, the stone still stands in that spot which is located in the northwest corner of The Evangelical Methodist Church of Dublin.

Charles Beaver, now aging, started to sell off parts of his 135-acre (0.55 km^{2}) farm. In 1794, he leased/purchased a lot on the northeast corner of Route 136 and Route 440 (1603 Whiteford Road) to George McCausland. In 1798, he sold to John Evatt 2 acres (8,100 m^{2}) on the southwest side of Route 136 and Route 440 (1536 Whiteford Road).

On October 20, 1800, Charles sold about 0.77-acre (3,100 m^{2}) to five trustees for a church to be erected (1528 Whiteford Road). In 1802, he sold lot #1 to George McCausland; George erected a tavern on it. This also served as the Fifth district voting place (Walt Moody's lot). In 1802, Charles sold 9.75 acres (39,500 m^{2}) to John Evatt (Roger Waddell's lot and Ira Lee's field).

The first school set up in Dublin was in 1812 on a 1-acre (4,000 m^{2}) lot from William Nevill to trustees William Silver, John Galbreath, George McCausland, and Thomas Barnes. This lot bordered Beaver's land and "was to have rights to the cool spring." The first public school in Dublin, by act of the 1850 General Assembly of Maryland, was started in 1855. The quarter acre lot was purchased from Jonathan Lemmon and was next to the church lot. This served as Dublin's public school until 1915 when a new school was built across the road.

Dublin, in 1858, was said to have had ten houses and places of business. By 1878, Dublin boasted two stores, a blacksmith shop, a wheelwright shop, a hoop maker, a tailor shop, one school and two churches, Dublin Methodist Episcopal Church and for the southerners Southern Methodist Episcopal Church. Some of the residents in 1878 were:

T.J. McCausland, R. Hooper, James Chenowith, R. Gallion, A.L. McCann, J.E. Jones, E. Willis, John McDoon, John Daughtery, William Neville, Jonathan Lemmon, Jane Davis, A.B. Lindsey, James Ramsey, John Crawford, and John Deckman.

== Dublin Methodist Church ==
In 1772, Bishop Frances Asbury had been in the area preaching and ministering the various areas. He returned to England and sent a deacon to establish a church in the area. A foundation was laid at the populated Greenstone, now on the Baltimore Boy Scout Camp off of Robinson Mill Road. The large stones can still be seen. For some reason, the church was never completed.

In 1800, Charles Beaver in Dublin conveyed 126 square perches of land (0.9 acres) to five Trustees in trust, "that they erect or build or have erected or built a house of worship for the use of the member's of the Methodist Episcopal Church." Probably in 1860 a clapboard construction, one room building was erected and served the community for eighty years.

In 1939, while demolishing the old clapboard church to make way for the new Port Deposit granite stone church, a date of 1860 was found carved in one of the roof rafters of the old church. The new church, which is constructed of local material, stone from Port Deposit, and slate from Slateville, also has ten beautiful stained glass windows donated by members of the church. Thanks to multiple donated hours of labor, the total cost of the church was only $14,053.

In 1963, a two story education wing was added to the existing building, and over the past several years several remodeling projects have been completed in various areas of the church.

In 1870, David and Driscilla Riley sold to the church 3 acres (12,000 m^{2}) and 120 square perches of land and dwelling for $13,000 to be used as the parsonage for the Harford circuit. The building was a two-story log construction, which was located just west of the present Dublin Market on Route 440 (Kilgore-Botts property) until 1977 when it burnt down. In 1872, Reverend Clarkson who was assigned to the eight church circuit (including Dublin, Darlington, Franklin, Watters Meeting [Thomas Run], Mt. Zion, Bel Air, Mt. Vernon, and Emory) refers to the condition and appearance of the parsonage in his journal.

In 1888, the first parsonage and 120 square perches of land was sold to Catherine Daugherty and a second parsonage was built on the remaining part of the lot. This served as the parsonage until 1968 when a new brick structure was built on Route 136 next to the church. The second parsonage was then sold.

Some can remember an old building that sat where the present day parsonage on Route 136 is; it was the original Dublin School. The three room structure was used for grades 1 thru 11 until 1915 when a new wooden schoolhouse was constructed across the road. R.L. McCann willed the old schoolhouse and land to the church. It was utilized as a Boy Scout meeting house until it was demolished to make way for the present day parsonage.

Today, the congregation has a number of 4-generation worshippers attending services. In the spring of 2000, the Dublin United Methodist Church, being one of the oldest Methodist churches in the New World, celebrated 200 years of worshipping.

== Schools ==
=== Dublin Elementary School ===
The mascot of Dublin Elementary School is the dragon. The motto is "Make Dublin Proud!". Located in the rural countryside of Harford County, Dublin Elementary serves approximately 250 students from pre-kindergarten through fifth grade.

=== Harford Christian School ===
The mascot of Harford Christian School is the eagle. Harford Christian serves students from preschool to grade 12. Founded in 1966, Harford Christian school had an enrollment of 488 students, K-12 in 2008. Students attend from Harford, Cecil, and Baltimore Counties in Maryland and York and Lancaster Counties in Pennsylvania. Harford Christian School is a ministry of Reformation Bible Church.

Harford Christian's Envirothon team won 1st place in the Maryland State competition in 2012 and 2013, which included both public and private schools.
