= Hickory, Maryland =

Unincorporated community in Maryland, United States

- Unincorporated community
- Location within Maryland Location within the United States
- Coordinates: 39°34′43″N 76°20′43″W
- Country: United States
- State: Maryland
- County: Harford
- Elevation: 476 ft (145 m)
- Time zone: UTC-5 (Eastern (EST))
  - Summer (DST): UTC-4 (EDT)
- Area codes: 410 & 443
- GNIS feature ID: 590454

Hickory is an unincorporated community in Harford County, Maryland, United States. Hickory is located at the junction of Maryland Route 543 and U.S. Route 1 Business 3 miles (4.8 km) north of Bel Air.
