= Creswell, Maryland =

Unincorporated community in Maryland, U.S.

Coordinates: 39°30′27″N 76°16′12″W

Creswell is an unincorporated community in Harford County, Maryland, United States. Fair Meadows was listed on the National Register of Historic Places in 1980.
