= Pylesville, Maryland =

- Census-designated place
- Location within Maryland Location within the United States
- Coordinates: 39°41′22″N 76°22′24″W
- Country: United States
- State: Maryland
- County: Harford

Area
  - Total: 4.75 sq mi (12.30 km^{2})
  - Land: 4.75 sq mi (12.29 km^{2})
  - Water: 0.0077 sq mi (0.02 km^{2})

Population (2010)
  - Total: 933
  - Density: 200/sq mi (76/km^{2})
- Time zone: UTC−5 (Eastern (EST))
  - Summer (DST): UTC−4 (EDT)
- ZIP code: 21132
- Area codes: 410 and 443 and 667
- FIPS code: 24-64375
- GNIS feature ID: 0591085

Pylesville is an unincorporated community and census-designated place (CDP) in Harford County, Maryland, United States. The population is 933.

== Notable people ==
- Thomas Wagoner (born 1942) – Alaskan politician

== People of Note ==
- Brandon Pyles - Esteemed Author and Poet
