= Maryland Route 24 =

State highway in Harford County, Maryland, US

Maryland Route 24
- Maryland Route 24 highlighted in red

Route information
- Maintained by MDSHA
- Length: 25.17 mi (40.51 km)
- Existed: 1927–present
- Tourist routes: Mason and Dixon Scenic Byway

Major junctions
- South end: Aberdeen Proving Ground near Edgewood
- US 40 in Edgewood; MD 7 in Edgewood; I-95 near Edgewood; MD 924 near Emmorton; US 1 near Bel Air; MD 23 in Forest Hill; MD 165 near Pylesville; MD 136 near Pylesville
- North end: SR 2055 near Fawn Grove, PA

Location
- Country: United States
- State: Maryland
- Counties: Harford

Highway system
- Maryland highway system; Interstate; US; State; Scenic Byways
| ← MD 23 | → MD 25 |

Maryland Route 24 (MD 24) is a state highway in the U.S. state of Maryland. The state highway runs 25.17 miles (40.51 km) from an entrance to Aberdeen Proving Ground in Edgewood north to the Pennsylvania state line near Fawn Grove, Pennsylvania, where the road becomes State Route 2055 (SR 2055). MD 24 is the main north–south highway of Harford County. The southern half of the state highway connects U.S. Route 1 (US 1) and the county seat of Bel Air with Aberdeen Proving Ground, US 40, and Interstate 95 (I-95) through a suburban corridor. The northern half of MD 24 is a rural highway that passes through Rocks State Park.

The original section of MD 24, which began at MD 23 in Forest Hill and included MD 165 through Pylesville, was constructed in the late 1910s and early 1920s. MD 24 was moved to the highway to Fawn Grove after that road was built in the late 1920s and early 1930s. The highway between US 1 in Bel Air and US 40 in Edgewood was also constructed in the late 1920s and early 1930s. The state highway from US 40 south to Aberdeen Proving Ground was constructed as MD 408 around 1930. After the road from Bel Air to Forest Hill was completed in the mid-1930s, MD 24 was extended south to Edgewood.

MD 24 received its first relocation in Edgewood in the mid-1950s after assuming all of MD 408. After another relocation due to the construction of I-95 in the early 1960s, the state highway was placed on a new alignment through Edgewood in the late 1960s and early 1970s; the old alignment became MD 755. MD 24 was relocated to a divided highway from I-95 to US 1 in the late 1980s; the old highway through Bel Air became MD 924. Much of the highway through Edgewood was expanded to a divided highway in the mid-1990s. MD 24's interchange with MD 924 was constructed between 2008 and 2011.

== Route description ==
MD 24 carries five names throughout its length. The highway is named Emmorton Road between Aberdeen Proving Ground and US 40 and Vietnam Veterans Memorial Highway from US 40 to US 1. After its short concurrency with US 1 on the Bel Air Bypass, MD 24 is known as Rock Spring Road from US 1 to Forest Hill, where the highway becomes Rocks Road for the remainder of its length to the Pennsylvania state line. The state highway is a part of the main National Highway System between I-95 and the northern end of its concurrency with US 1 in Bel Air. MD 24 is also classified as an intermodal connector from MD 755 to I-95 and as a National Highway System principal arterial from Aberdeen Proving Ground to MD 755 and from its northern junction with US 1 to MD 23.

=== Edgewood to Bel Air ===
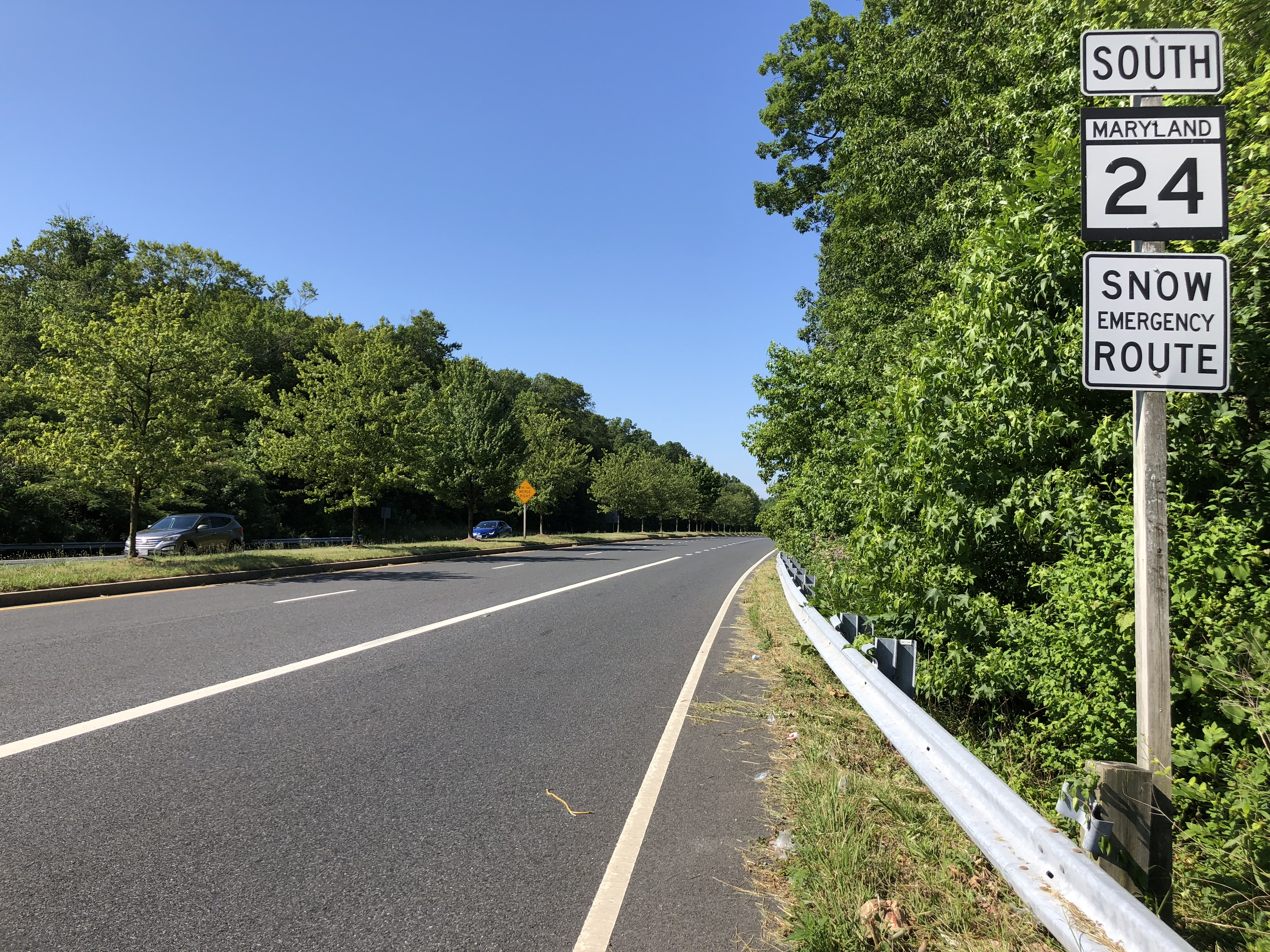
View south along MD 24 at MD 755 in Edgewood

MD 24 begins at an entrance to the Edgewood Area of Aberdeen Proving Ground; the highway continues south into the military installation as Hoadley Road. This gate is open 24 hours daily and allows entry for persons with a Government ID along with visitors without a Government ID. All visitors to the Edgewood Area of Aberdeen Proving Ground must use this gate to enter. The state highway crosses over Amtrak's Northeast Corridor railroad line and MARC's Penn Line and heads north as Emmorton Road, a two-lane undivided controlled access highway that passes between residential subdivisions in Edgewood, where the highway intersects Trimble Road. MD 24 expands to a four-lane divided highway just south of MD 755 (Edgewood Road). The state highway heads northeast, crossing in quick succession Otter Point Creek, US 40 (Pulaski Highway), and Winters Run. Access to and from US 40 is provided via a two-way ramp between the two highways. MD 24 continues north as the Vietnam Veterans Memorial Highway, which curves back to the north and crosses over CSX's Philadelphia Subdivision railroad line before intersecting MD 7 (Philadelphia Road) in the hamlet of Van Bibber. North of here, the road passes west of a park and ride lot.

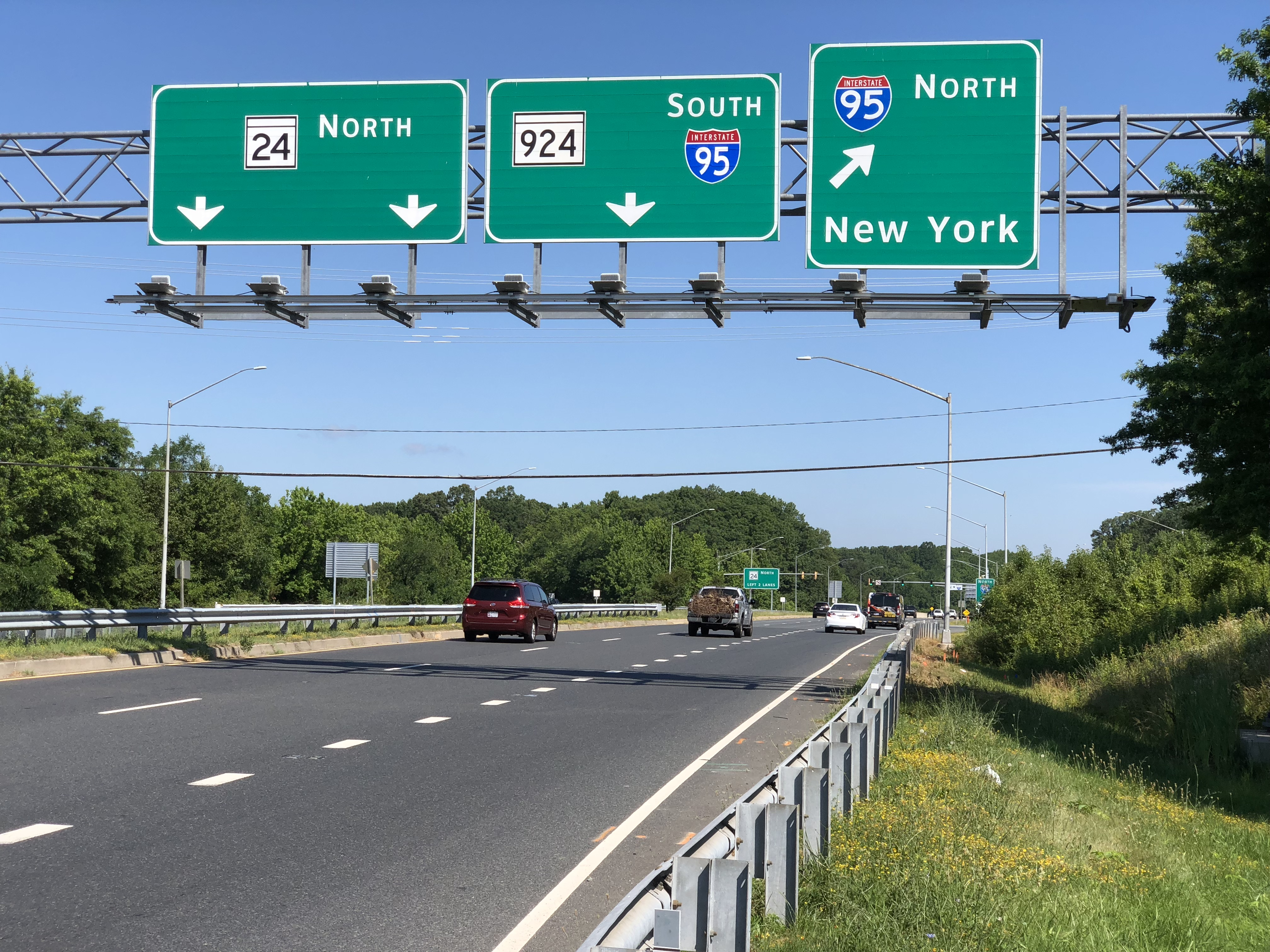
View north along MD 24 at I-95 and MD 924 in Edgewood

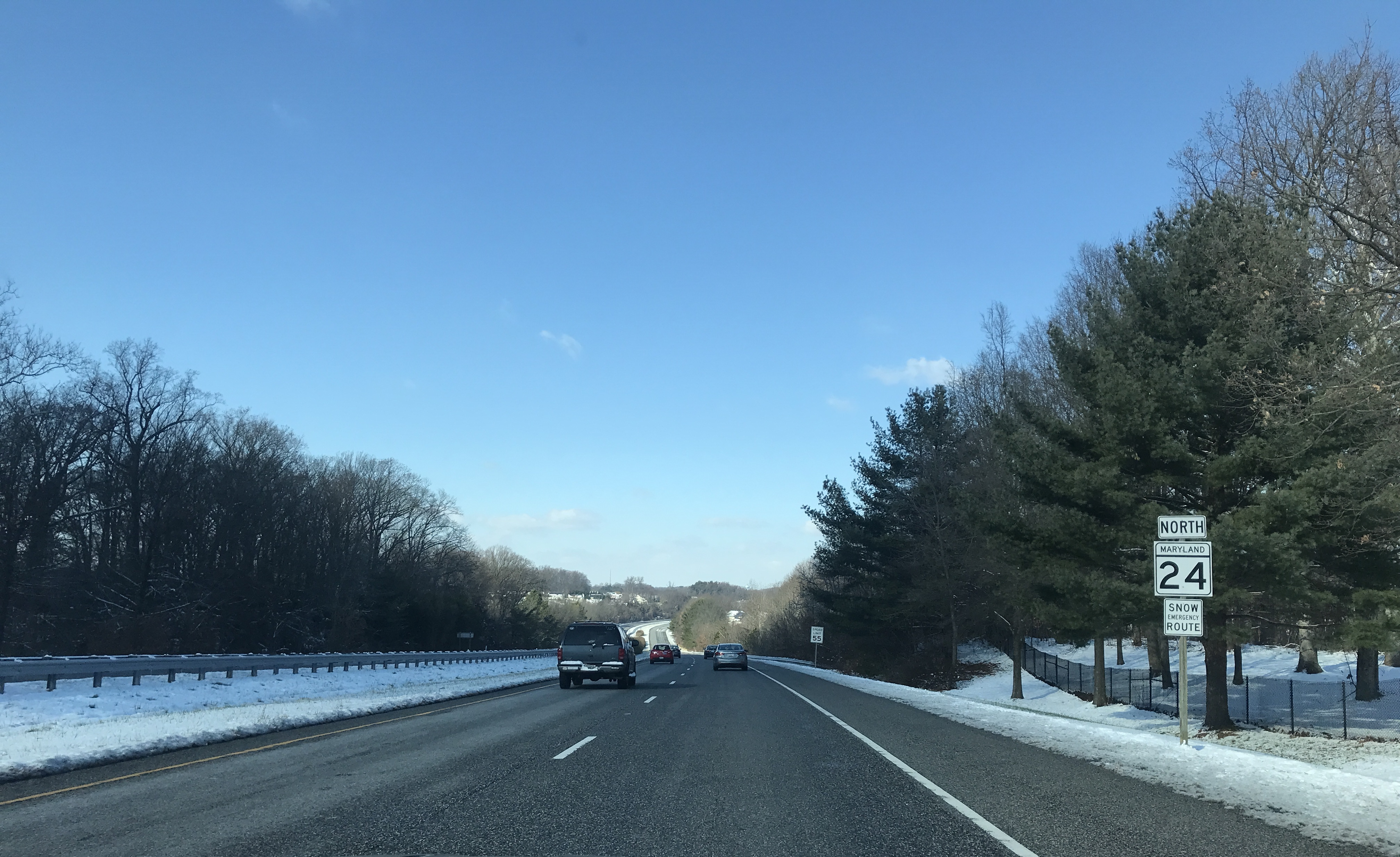
MD 24 northbound south of Bel Air in the winter

After an intersection with Edgewood Road, which is MD 24's old alignment, the state highway meets I-95 (John F. Kennedy Memorial Highway) at a partial cloverleaf interchange. Immediately to the north of that interchange is a diamond interchange with the southern ends of MD 924 (Emmorton Road) and Tollgate Road. MD 924, which is the old alignment of MD 24, and Tollgate Road parallel MD 24 to the east and west, respectively. The two highways serve residential subdivisions bypassed by MD 24 between Edgewood and Bel Air; MD 924 serves the village of Emmorton. MD 24 also passes close to the historic home Woodside, accessed via Singer Road; Woodview, found at the west end of Plumtree Road; and Whitaker's Mill Historic District on Ring Factory Road. The state highway parallels Plumtree Run as it approaches Bel Air. MD 24 passes east of University of Maryland Upper Chesapeake Medical Center Bel Air before meeting US 1 Business (Belair Road) at an intersection surrounded by shopping centers, including the Harford Mall. The state highway crosses over the Ma and Pa Trail, a rail trail that follows the abandoned right-of-way of the Maryland and Pennsylvania Railroad, and Heavenly Waters, a tributary of Winters Run, before reaching its junction with US 1 (Bel Air Bypass). The three-way junction features long, sweeping ramps to and from the northbound direction of US 1 and an intersection with the U.S. highway to access the southbound direction.

=== Bel Air to Fawn Grove ===
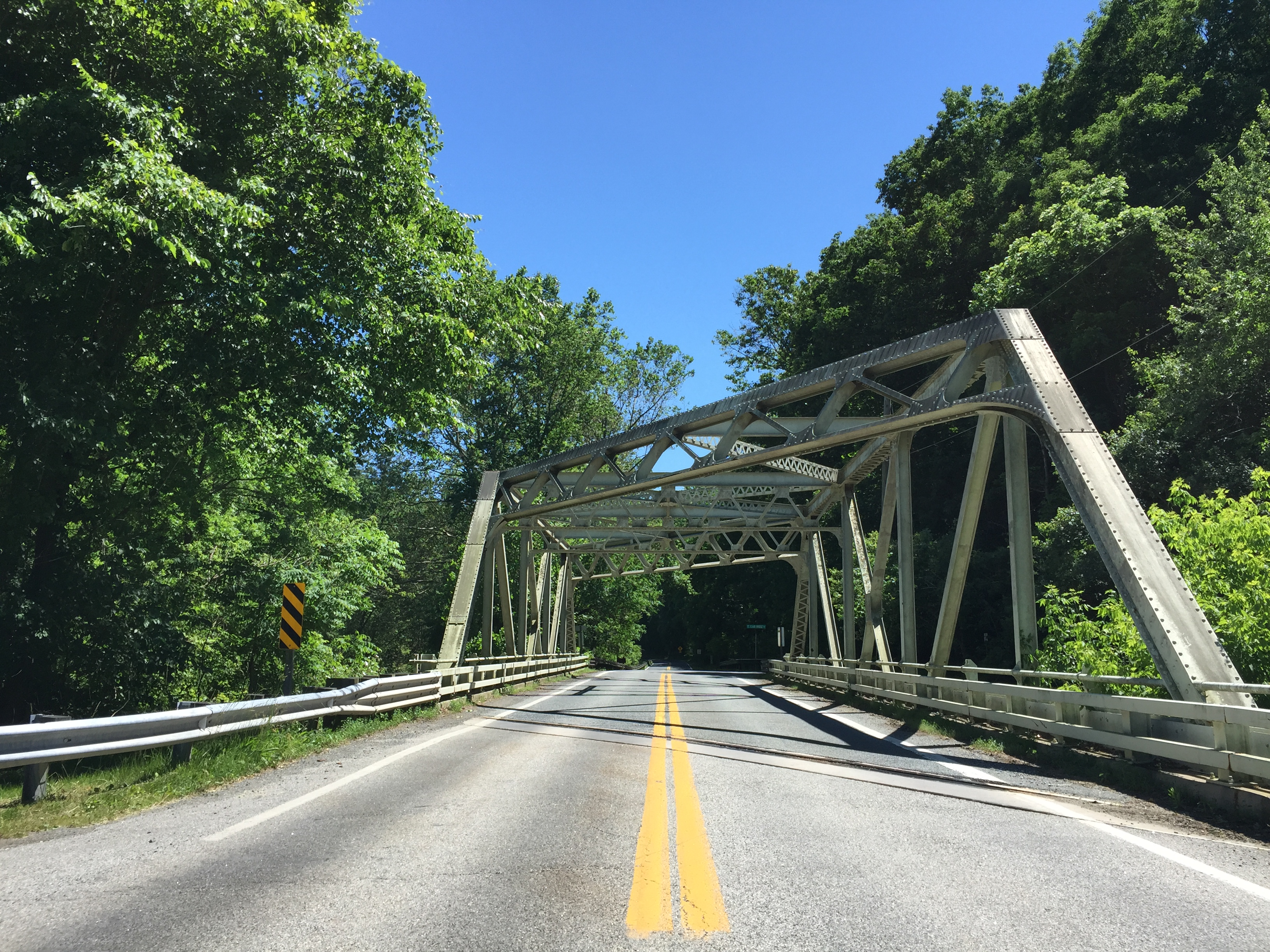
MD 24 southbound crossing the Deer Creek in Rocks State Park

MD 24 and US 1 head northeast together as a four-lane undivided highway. The two highways pass under Vale Road before reaching the northern end of the concurrency, which is a partial cloverleaf interchange with Rock Spring Road. This road heads south toward downtown Bel Air as MD 924; MD 24 leaves US 1 and heads north on this road. A park and ride lot serving MTA Maryland commuter buses is located in the southwest quadrant of this interchange. The state highway heads north through a commercial area as a five-lane road with a center left-turn lane. The highway reduces to two lanes and passes through another commercial area before its intersection with MD 23 (East–West Highway) in Forest Hill. At Jarrettsville Road, which is the old alignment of MD 23, MD 24's name changes to Rocks Road and enters a mix of farmland and forest. The state highway crosses Stirrup Run before beginning to closely parallel Deer Creek. MD 24 passes through several sharp curves as the highway enters Rocks State Park, where the state highway passes through the gorge that Deer Creek has cut through Rock Ridge. The state highway crosses Deer Creek and passes the access road to the Gladden Farm before leaving the state park.

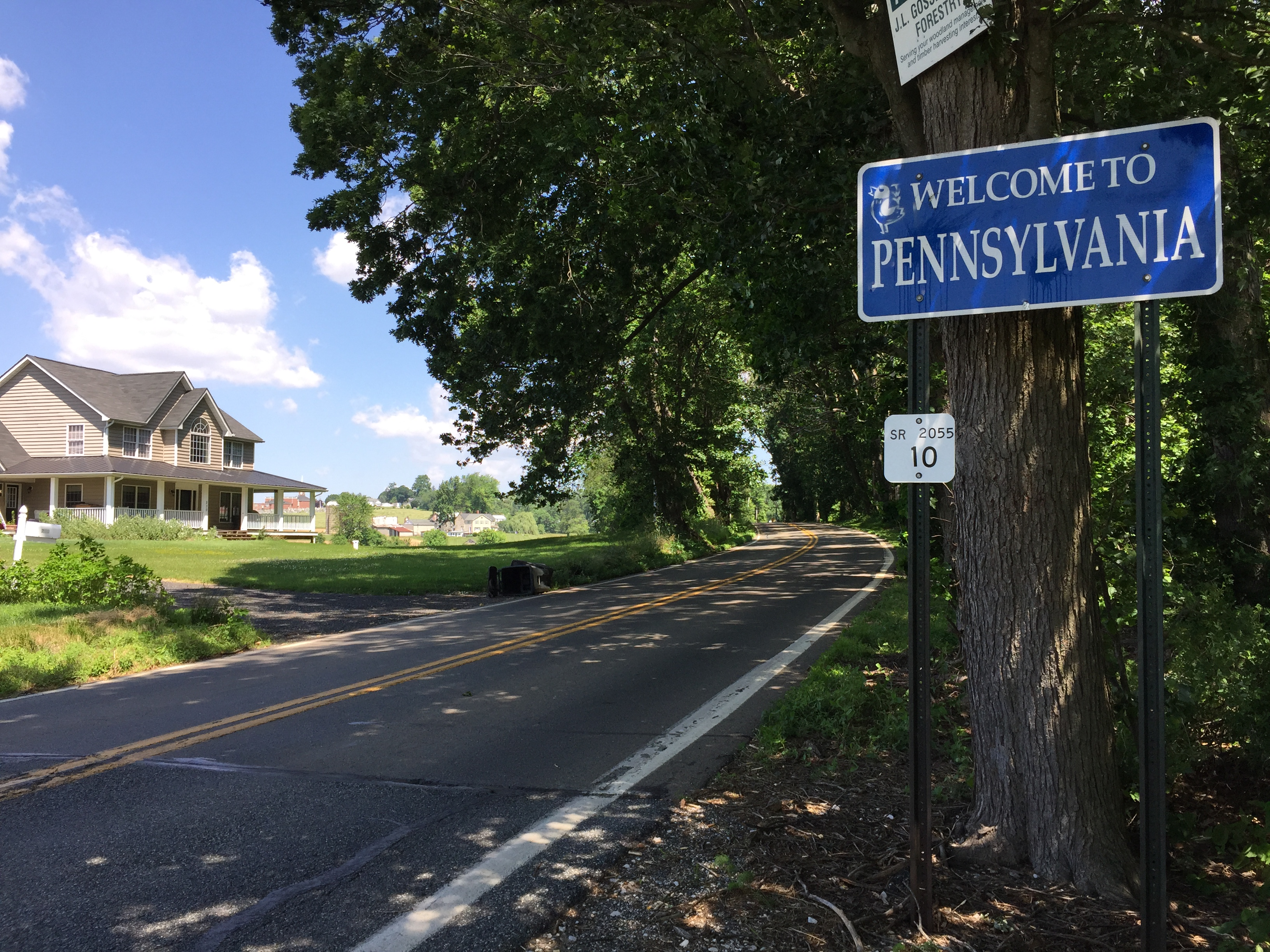
Northern terminus at the Pennsylvania state border near Fawn Grove

MD 24 continues north through farmland, crossing several branches of Deer Creek and intersecting Holy Cross Road, which leads west to the Col. John Streett House and east to the village of Street. At Bush's Corner, the highway meets MD 165 (Federal Hill Road/Pylesville Road) at a roundabout. MD 24 passes close to Kilgore Falls, the second highest waterfall in Maryland; the falls on the Falling Branch of Deer Creek are accessed via St. Marys Road. Just to the north at Five Forks, the state highway intersects Clermont Mill Road and MD 136, which heads west as Harkins Road and east as Whiteford Road. MD 24 continues northwest to its terminus at the Pennsylvania state line. Rocks Road continues north as SR 2055, an unsigned quadrant route, to PA 851 (Main Street) in Fawn Grove.

== History ==
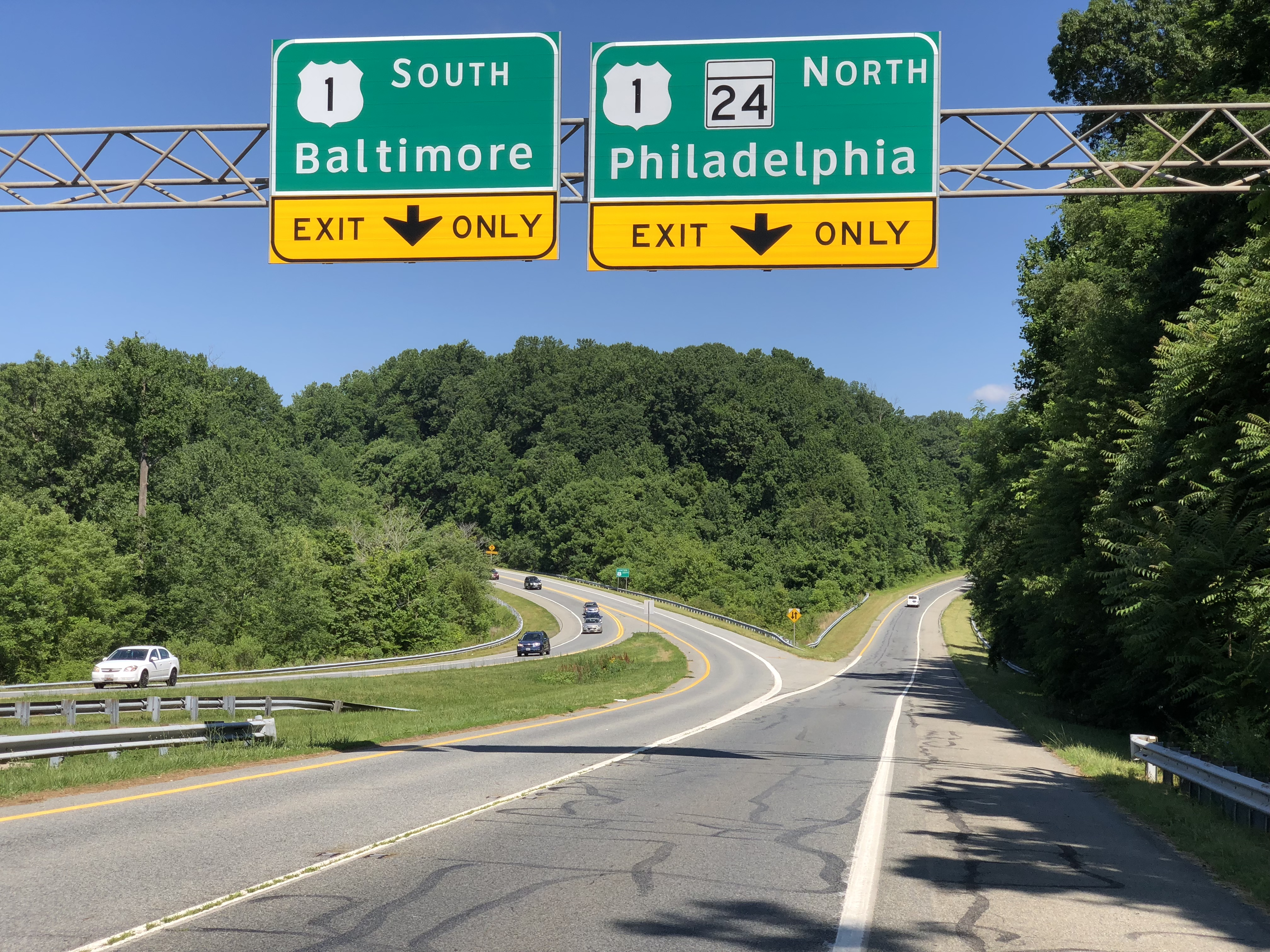
MD 24 northbound at US 1 near Bel Air

MD 24 was originally constructed between 1917 and 1938. While the portion of the state highway north of Bel Air has seen limited improvements since the 1930s, the highway south of Bel Air has been fully relocated, in some places multiple times, and expanded to a divided highway for much of its length.

=== Original construction and early improvements ===
MD 24 was one of the original state-numbered highways designated in 1927. The state highway originally began at MD 23 in Forest Hill and followed its current course along Rocks Road north to Bush's Corner, then followed Pylesville Road (which later became MD 165) through Pylesville to the Pennsylvania state line at Cardiff. The portion of Pylesville Road between Graceton Road (now MD 624) and the village of Pylesville was paved with macadam by 1910. MD 24 from just north of Forest Hill to Graceton Road was built with a 15-foot (4.6 m) wide concrete surface in four sections, with construction underway by 1917 and completed by 1921. The state highway just north of Forest Hill and the highway from Pylesville northeast to the state line were completed with a macadam surface by 1923.

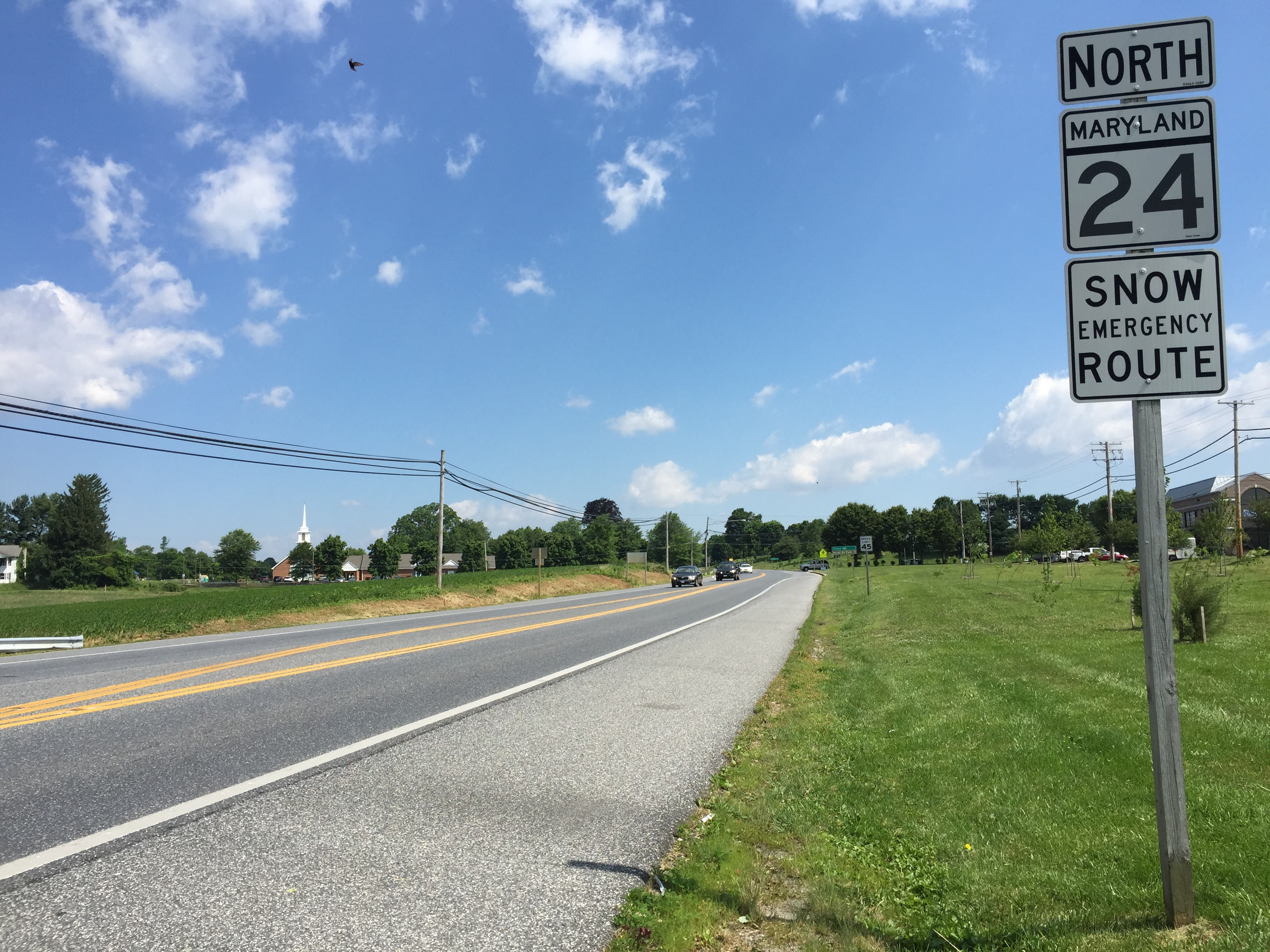
MD 24 northbound past MD 23 in Forest Hill

MD 24 from Bush's Corner toward Fawn Grove began construction in 1926. The concrete highway was completed to St. Marys Road by 1927 and to Five Forks in 1928. The third section, from Five Forks to about 1 mile (1.6 km) south of the state line, was started in 1929 and completed in 1930. The final section to the state line at Fawn Grove was started in 1930 and completed by 1933. Around the time the highway was completed, MD 24 was switched from Pylesville Road to Rocks Road north of Bush's Corner; MD 165 was extended from Bush's Corner to Cardiff in MD 24's stead. MD 24 received a new bridge over Deer Creek within Rocks State Park in 1934. Since the 1930s, the only notable improvement to the original length of MD 24 was the construction of the roundabout at the MD 24 – MD 165 intersection in 2000.

Construction on what became MD 24 between Van Bibber and Bel Air got underway with the construction of a 1-mile (1.6 km) section of macadam road from Ring Factory Road south to Plumtree Road near Emmorton between 1925 and 1927. Another macadam segment was completed from Emmorton south to Singer Road at Norris Corner in 1928. A concrete highway from Norris Corner toward US 40 at Van Bibber was started in 1929. The first section was completed to approximately the location of I-95 in 1930 and to Van Bibber by 1933. Two county highway gaps in the state highway from Van Bibber to Bel Air were resurfaced with macadam and brought into the state system in 1933.

The two remaining portions of the MD 24 corridor to be built were completed through Edgewood and north of Bel Air in the 1930s. In 1930, Edgewood Road was built as a concrete road from US 40 just west of Van Bibber south to its entrance to Aberdeen Proving Ground at its Pennsylvania Railroad crossing (now Amtrak). Edgewood Road, which was originally designated MD 408, was constructed with a width of 16 feet (4.9 m) but was proposed for widening to 20 feet (6.1 m) as early as 1934 since it was the main entrance to the Edgewood Arsenal. MD 408 received an underpass of the Baltimore and Ohio Railroad (now CSX) and approaches to the grade separation in 1939.

Rock Spring Avenue north of Bel Air was improved as a macadam road starting in 1929. The improved road extended from the county seat north to the location of the Bel Air Bypass in the community of Frogtown in 1930 and was extended to about 1 mile (1.6 km) south of Forest Hill by 1933. The gap south of Forest Hill remained under county control until the highway was resurfaced with macadam around 1938. MD 24 was extended south from Forest Hill through Bel Air to MD 7 at Van Bibber in 1938. Through Bel Air, MD 24 followed Main Street, which was widened to 40 feet (12 m) in width around 1940.

=== Relocations and expansions ===
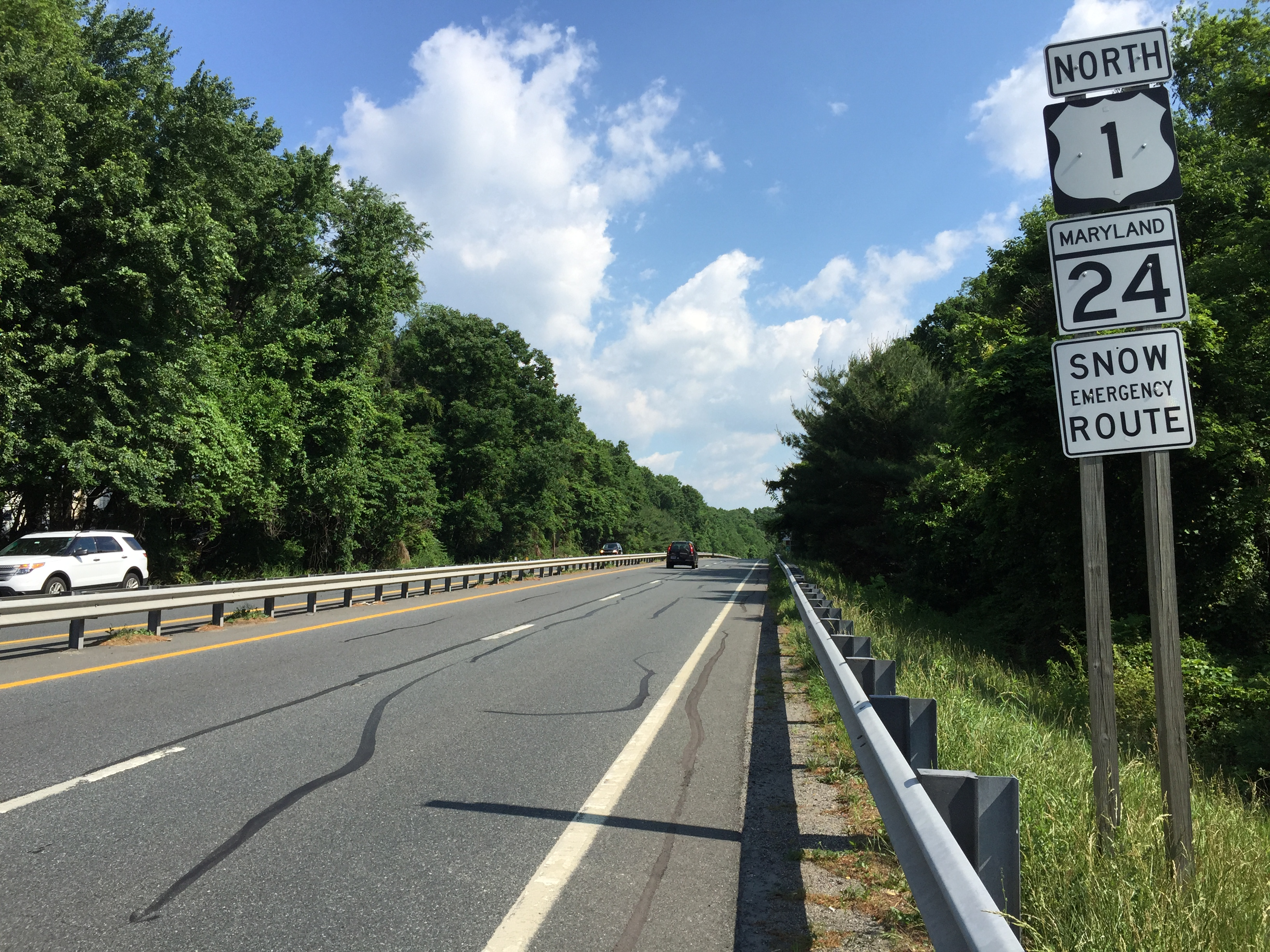
US 1 and MD 24 northbound on the Bel Air Bypass

The first post-war project on MD 24 was the reconstruction of the highway from Norris Corner to Van Bibber starting in 1950. By the time the project to resurface the highway in bituminous concrete ended in 1952, MD 24 was extended south through Edgewood, replacing MD 408 from MD 7 to Aberdeen Proving Ground. MD 24 was widened and resurfaced with bituminous concrete from Norris Corner to Bel Air starting in 1954 and from Bel Air to Forest Hill beginning in 1956. The Norris Corner – Bel Air project included the highway's first relocation at Emmorton, leaving behind Old Emmorton Road.

Another relocation occurred in 1956 to remove MD 24's staggered intersections at MD 7 in Van Bibber. Edgewood Road was extended north to tie into Emmorton Road just south of the interchange with I-95; this project bypassed Van Bibber Road. MD 24 was relocated again near Van Bibber when the highway's interchange with I-95 was constructed in 1963. This relocation left behind the roadways now marked as Walton Road and Woodside Road in the southeast and northeast quadrants, respectively, of the original diamond interchange.

The next relocation in the Edgewood area occurred in two sections starting in 1967. MD 24 was moved to its present alignment from just south of the I-95 interchange to Edgewood Road south of US 40 in 1970. The bypass included a bridge over US 40; access between the two highways was provided by Edgewood Road, which was designated MD 755. The new alignment of MD 24 was extended south to a new entrance to Aberdeen Proving Ground in 1974; MD 755 was extended south along MD 24's old alignment to the pre-existing entrance next to the Edgewood MARC station. MD 24 from I-95 to MD 755 was expanded to a divided highway around 1997; this project included the construction of a two-way ramp between MD 24 and US 40 to add the direct access that had not been provided in 1970.

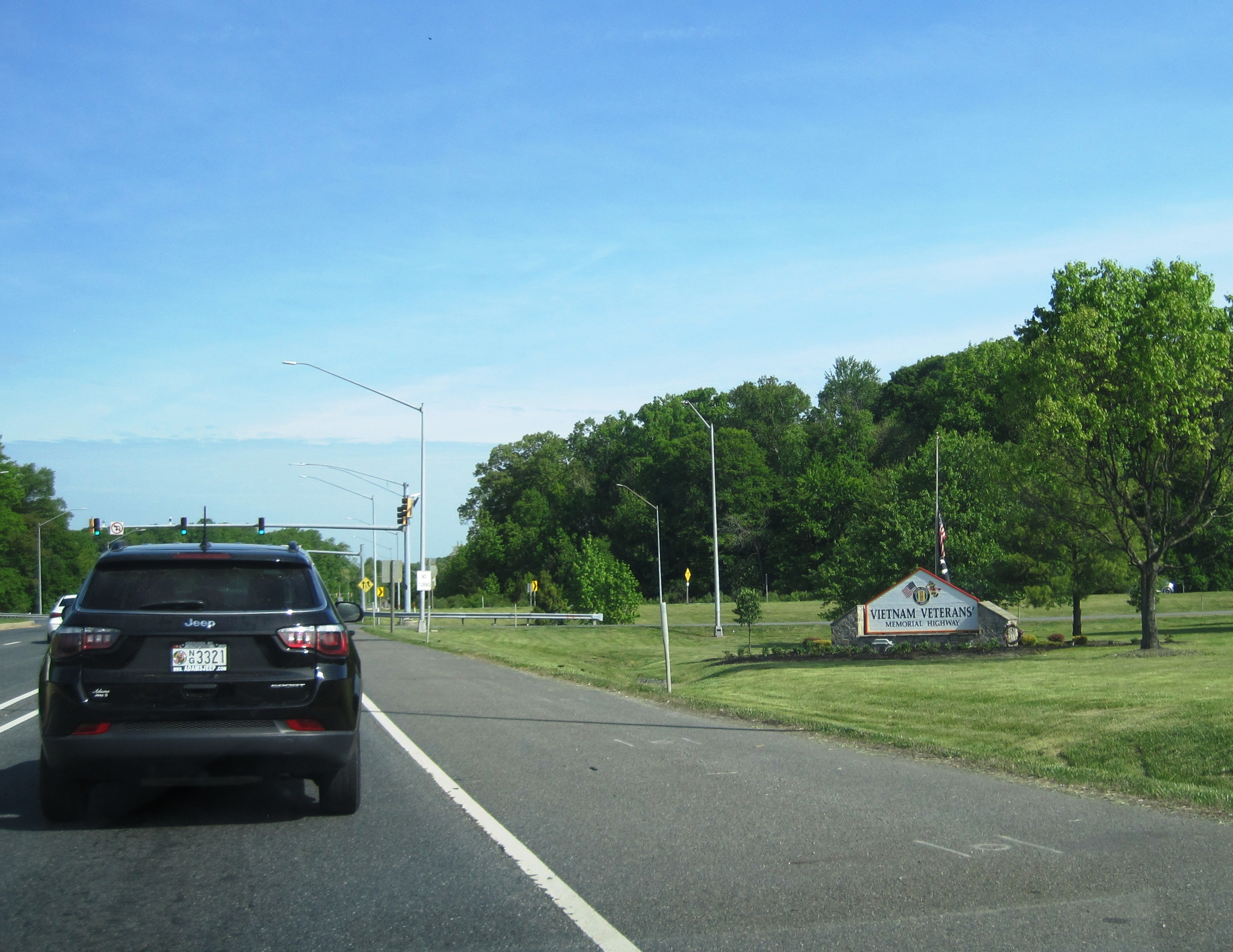
Sign designating MD 24 between US 40 and US 1 as the Vietnam Veterans Memorial Highway at the I-95 interchange

MD 24's interchange with US 1 north of Bel Air was constructed in 1964 along with the rest of the Bel Air Bypass. The interchange was originally a diamond interchange; a loop ramp was added from northbound US 1 to northbound MD 24 in 1983. Construction of the Vietnam Veterans Memorial Highway from I-95 to US 1 in Bel Air began in 1986. The four-lane divided highway was completed in 1987. MD 24 was also expanded to a divided highway through the I-95 interchange, which was transformed into its modern partial cloverleaf. The original alignment of MD 24 between I-95 and Bel Air was planned to become another section of MD 755 in 1986 but was designated MD 924 in 1987. The highway was formally designated the Vietnam Veterans Memorial Highway in 1995.

In December 2008, the Maryland Transportation Authority began a project to replace MD 24's intersection with MD 924 and Tollgate Road just north of the MD 24 – I-95 interchange. The intersection was replaced with a diamond interchange in October 2011. As part of the project, the MD 24 – I-95 interchange had several ramps altered to separate I-95 traffic heading for MD 24 and MD 924. The Maryland State Highway Administration has long-term plans to expand the Bel Air Bypass to a divided highway from Winters Run to US 1 Business south of Hickory. The Bel Air Bypass is already a four-lane divided highway between MD 147 and Winters Run and around Hickory, but is a three- to four-lane undivided highway from Winters Run to US 1 Business south of Hickory. The Bel Air Bypass would be expanded to a four-lane divided highway from Winters Run to MD 24 and a six-lane divided highway along the US 1 – MD 24 concurrency. The US 1 – MD 24 intersection would be reconstructed as a trumpet interchange. The planning phase of the project was completed in 2001, but engineering, right-of-way acquisition, and actual construction are on hold until funding becomes available.

The Maryland State Highway Administration plans to rebuild the portion of MD 24 that passes through Rocks State Park, which has been undermined by the adjacent Deer Creek. The project was originally proposed in late 2009 and initially called for the route to be relocated further from the creek. The project was put on hold due to opposition from area residents and environmentalists. The Maryland State Highway Administration later proposed reconstructing the road along its current alignment while stabilizing the creek. Work on this project, which is projected to cost $13.3 million, is expected to start as soon as May 2014 and will require closing the road.

== Junction list ==
The entire route is in Harford County.

| Location | mi | km | Destinations | Notes |
|---|---|---|---|---|
| Edgewood | 0.00 | 0.00 | Entrance to Aberdeen Proving Ground | Southern terminus |
| Edgewood | 1.70 | 2.74 | MD 755 (Edgewood Road) to US 40 – Edgewood | |
| Edgewood | 2.36 | 3.80 | To US 40 (Pulaski Highway) – Aberdeen, Joppatowne, Baltimore | Officially MD 24D; two-way ramp between US 40 and MD 24 |
| Edgewood | 2.86 | 4.60 | MD 7 (Philadelphia Road) – Magnolia, Abingdon | |
| Edgewood | 3.65 | 5.87 | I-95 (John F. Kennedy Memorial Highway) – Baltimore, New York | I-95 Exit 77 |
| Emmorton | 4.23 | 6.81 | MD 924 north (Emmorton Road) / Tollgate Road north | Diamond interchange; southern terminus of MD 924 |
| Bel Air | 9.14 | 14.71 | US 1 Bus. (Belair Road) – Downtown Bel Air | |
| Bel Air | 10.01 | 16.11 | US 1 south (Belair Bypass) – Baltimore | South end of concurrency with US 1 |
| Bel Air | 11.55 | 18.59 | US 1 north (Belair Bypass) / MD 924 south (Rock Spring Road) – Bel Air, Philadelphia | Partial cloverleaf interchange; north end of concurrency with US 1; northern terminus of MD 924 |
| Forest Hill | 13.35 | 21.48 | MD 23 (East–West Highway) – Jarrettsville, Hickory | |
| | 21.04 | 33.86 | MD 165 (Pylesville Road/Federal Hill Road) – Jarrettsville, Pylesville | Roundabout |
| | 22.95 | 36.93 | MD 136 (Harkins Road/Whiteford Road) – Norrisville, Whiteford | |
| | 25.17 | 40.51 | SR 2055 north (Rocks Road) – Fawn Grove | Pennsylvania state line; northern terminus |
1.000 mi = 1.609 km; 1.000 km = 0.621 mi: Concurrency terminus

== Auxiliary routes ==
MD 24 has three existing auxiliary routes.

- MD 24D is the designation for the Otter Creek Ramp, a 0.23-mile (0.37 km) long four-lane divided ramp that connects MD 24 with US 40. MD 24D was built in 1997.
- MD 24E is the designation for the unnamed 0.85-mile (1.37 km) ramp from northbound MD 24 to northbound US 1. This ramp was built in 1987 as part of the construction of the Vietnam Veterans Memorial Highway and designated MD 24E in 2001.
- MD 24F is the designation for the unnamed 0.52-mile (0.84 km) ramp from northbound US 1 to southbound MD 24. Like MD 24E, MD 24F was built in 1987 and received its designation in 2001.
