= Maryland Route 165 =

State highway in Maryland, United States

Maryland Route 165
- Maryland Route 165 highlighted in red

Route information
- Maintained by MDSHA
- Length: 20.38 mi (32.80 km)
- Existed: 1927–present

Major junctions
- South end: Baldwin Mill Road in Baldwin
- MD 145 near Baldwin; MD 152 in Fallston; MD 23 in Jarrettsville; MD 24 near Pylesville; MD 624 in Pylesville; MD 543 in Pylesville; MD 136 in Whiteford
- North end: PA 74 in Cardiff

Location
- Country: United States
- State: Maryland
- Counties: Baltimore, Harford

Highway system
- Maryland highway system; Interstate; US; State; Scenic Byways
← MD 162	→ MD 166

Maryland Route 165 (MD 165) is a state highway in the U.S. state of Maryland. The state highway runs 20.38 miles (32.80 km) from Baldwin, Baltimore County, north to the Pennsylvania state line in Cardiff, Harford County, where the highway continues as Pennsylvania Route 74 (PA 74). MD 165 passes through western and northern Harford County, where it connects the communities of Fallston, Jarrettsville, Pylesville, and Whiteford. The state highway was constructed as part of MD 24 through Pylesville and Whiteford in the late 1910s and early 1920s. MD 165 from Baldwin through Jarrettsville to west of Pylesville was built in the late 1920s and early 1930s. When MD 24 was rerouted in 1933, MD 165 was extended along that highway's old routing through Pylesville and Whiteford, much of which was relocated in 1960.

== Route description ==
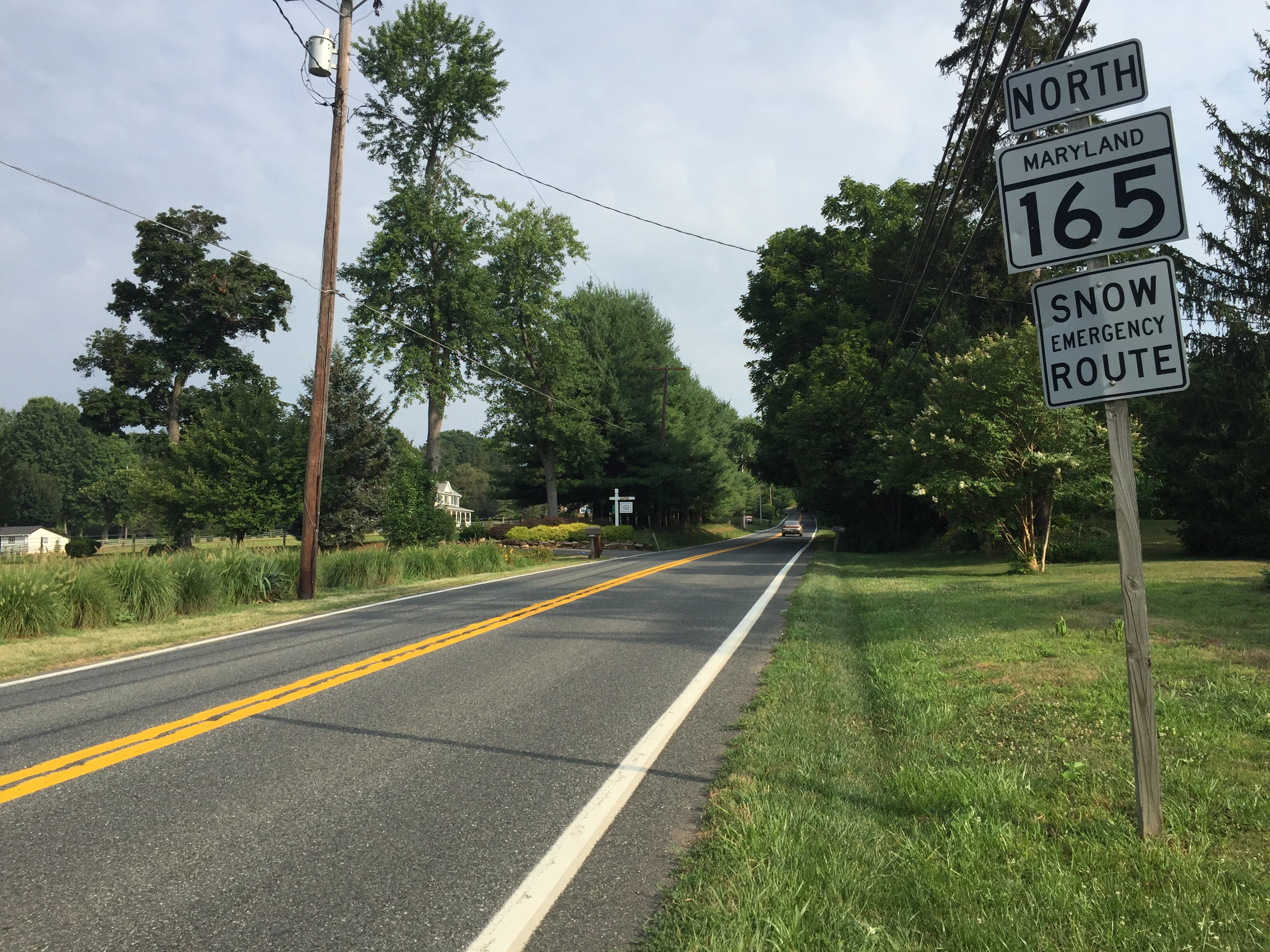
View north from the south end of MD 165 in Baldwin

MD 165 begins at a seemingly arbitrary location along Baldwin Mill Road; this location was once where the highway intersected the Maryland and Pennsylvania Railroad. Baldwin Mill Road continues south as part of a series of county roads—Fork Road, Sunshine Avenue, and Bradshaw Road—that parallel Little Gunpowder Falls along the eastern edge of Baltimore County through the communities of Baldwin, Fork, Kingsville, and Bradshaw. MD 165 heads north as a two-lane undivided road that meets the eastern end of MD 145 (Sweet Air Road) before curving east to cross Little Gunpowder Falls into Harford County. The state highway passes through a mix of farms and forests on its way to the hamlet of Upper Crossroads in Fallston, where the state highway intersects MD 152 (Fallston Road). MD 165 crosses the West Branch of Winters Run, passes through the hamlet of Putnam, and intersects the western end of East–West Highway, which carries MD 23, just south of Jarrettsville. The two state highways run concurrently to the center of the village, where MD 23 turns west onto Norrisville Road at the intersection with its old alignment, Jarrettsville Road.

MD 165 continues north from Jarrettsville as Federal Hill Road, which passes through the namesake hamlet then curves east and crosses Deer Creek. At Bush's Corner, where the state highway meets MD 24 (Rocks Road) at a roundabout, its name changes to Pylesville Road and the highway passes a trio of schools. North Harford High School on the south side of the highway is connected to the middle and elementary schools on the north side by a pedestrian tunnel. MD 165 continues east through Pylesville past the southern terminus of MD 624 (Graceton Road) and curves to the northeast and meets the northern end of MD 543 (Ady Road) a short distance north of the village of Street. The state highway crosses Broad Creek and parallels Old Pylesville Road northeast through the village of Whiteford. Both the old road and modern MD 165 intersect MD 136 (Whiteford Road). Old Pylesville Road passes through Cardiff, which contains the Slate Ridge School within the Whiteford-Cardiff Historic District preserving the area's slate heritage. MD 165 bypasses the village on the way to its northern terminus at the Pennsylvania state line. The highway continues north as PA 74 (Delta Road), which bypasses Cardiff's neighbor across the state line, the borough of Delta.

== History ==
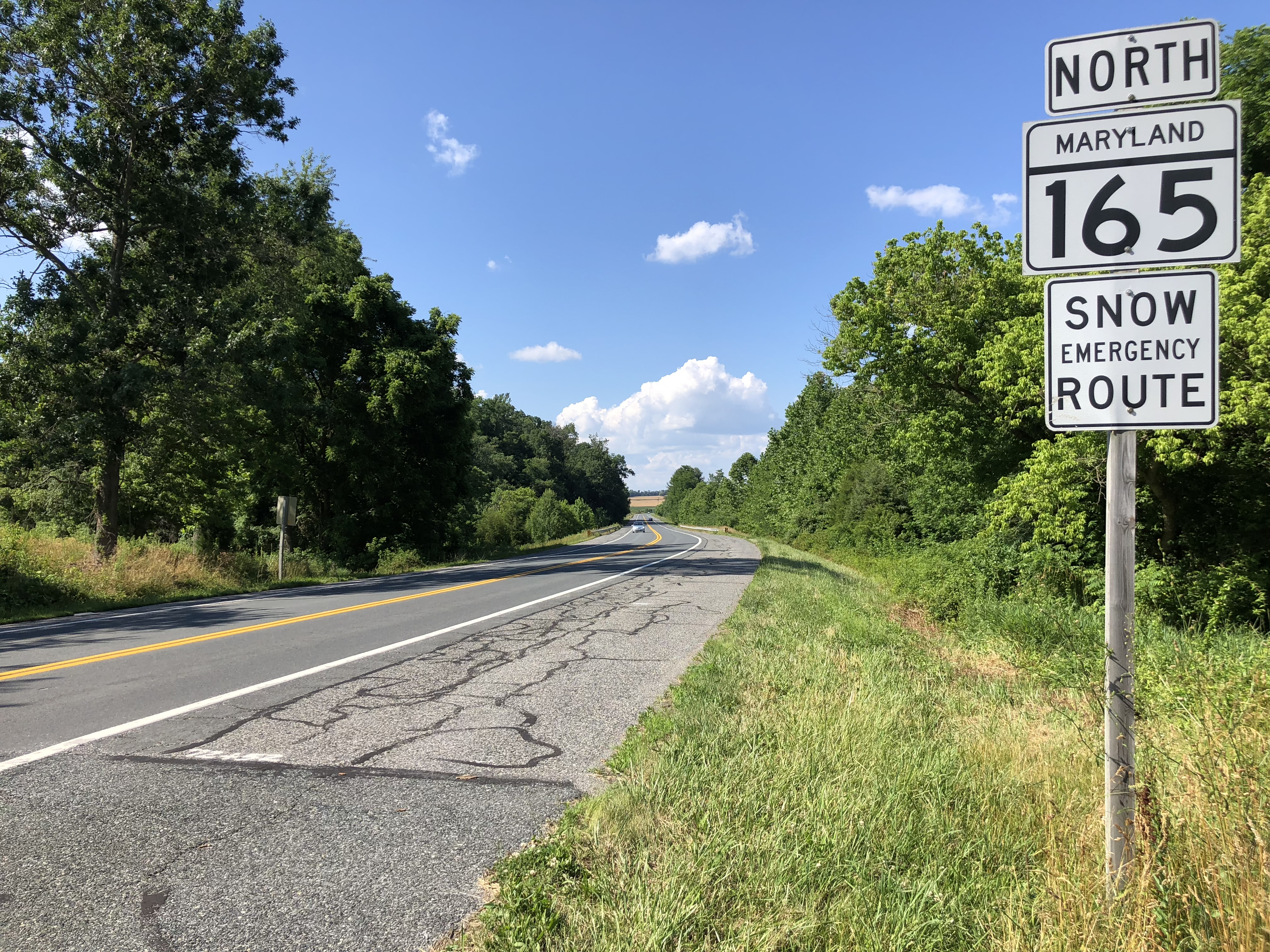
MD 165 northbound past MD 543 in Pylesville

The first portion of MD 165 to be paved was constructed as part of MD 24, which originally followed Pylesville Road to Cardiff instead of continuing north toward Fawn Grove, Pennsylvania. The portion of Pylesville Road between Graceton Road and Broad Creek was paved by 1910. Pylesville Road from Graceton Road west to Bush's Corner was constructed as a 15-foot (4.6 m) wide concrete road by 1919. The road from Broad Creek north to Cardiff was constructed as a macadam road between 1921 and 1923. Pylesville Road was expanded to a width of 20 feet (6.1 m) from Pylesville to Cardiff between 1926 and 1930. MD 24 and MD 165 were moved to their present corridors north of Bush's Corner in 1933.

The portion of MD 165 from its southern terminus at the Maryland and Pennsylvania Railroad north to the MD 145 intersection was built as a concrete road in 1926 and 1927 as part of the highway between Cockeysville and Baldwin. MD 165 was constructed north from Jarrettsville starting in 1924; the concrete highway reached Federal Hill in 1927. A short section of the state highway south of Jarrettsville was started in 1926 and completed in 1928. MD 165 was extended north from Federal Hill to near Deer Creek around 1930. The state highway was completed between Jarrettsville and Baldwin in 1932. MD 165 was completed when the final section of the modern highway was finished from west of Deer Creek to Bush's Corner in 1933. MD 165 was relocated from Pylesville to the Pennsylvania state line around 1960, leaving behind old Pylesville Road. The roundabout at the MD 24 junction was built in 2000.

== Junction list ==
County	Location	mi	km	Destinations	Notes
Baltimore	Baldwin	0.00	0.00	Baldwin Mill Road south – Fork	Southern terminus
Baltimore	Baldwin	0.83	1.34	MD 145 west (Sweet Air Road) – Jacksonville	Eastern terminus of MD 145
Harford	Fallston	3.59	5.78	MD 152 (Fallston Road) – Fallston	
Harford	Jarrettsville	6.92	11.14	MD 23 east (East–West Highway) – Forest Hill	South end of concurrency with MD 23
Harford	Jarrettsville	8.20	13.20	MD 23 north (Norrisville Road) – Norrisville	North end of concurrency with MD 23
Harford	Pylesville	15.13	24.35	MD 24 (Rocks Road) – Bel Air, Fawn Grove	Roundabout
Harford	Pylesville	16.34	26.30	MD 624 north (Graceton Road) – Graceton	Southern terminus of MD 624
Harford	Pylesville	17.15	27.60	MD 543 south (Ady Road) – Hickory	Northern terminus of MD 543
Harford	Whiteford	19.63	31.59	MD 136 (Whiteford Road) – Graceton, Dublin	
Harford	Cardiff	20.38	32.80	PA 74 north (Delta Road) – Red Lion, York	Pennsylvania state line; northern terminus
1.000 mi = 1.609 km; 1.000 km = 0.621 mi: Concurrency terminus
