= Maryland Route 624 =

State highway in Maryland, United States

Maryland Route 624
- Graceton Road
- Maryland Route 624 highlighted in red

Route information
- Maintained by MDSHA
- Length: 3.02 mi (4.86 km)
- Existed: 1936–present

Major junctions
- South end: MD 165 in Pylesville
- MD 136 in Graceton
- North end: SR 2080 near Graceton

Location
- Country: United States
- State: Maryland
- Counties: Harford

Highway system
- Maryland highway system; Interstate; US; State; Scenic Byways
← MD 623	→ MD 625

Maryland Route 624 (MD 624) is a state highway in the U.S. state of Maryland. The state highway runs 3.02 miles (4.86 km) from MD 165 in Pylesville north to State Route 2080 (SR 2080) at the Pennsylvania state line a short distance north of its intersection with MD 136 at Graceton. MD 624 was constructed in the mid-1930s.

== Route description ==
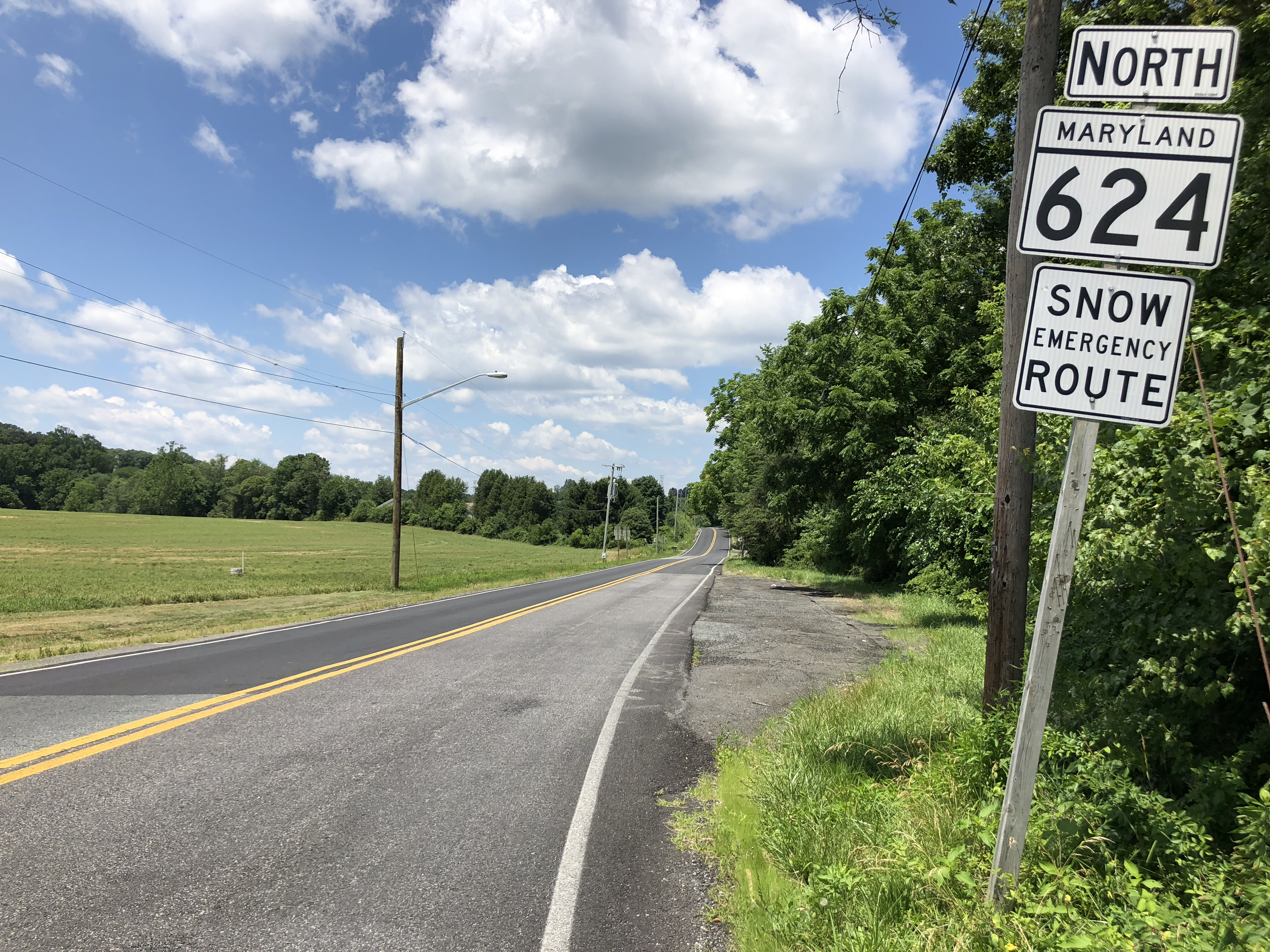
View north along MD 624 at MD 136 in Graceton

MD 624 begins at an intersection with MD 165 (Pylesville Road) in Pylesville. Grier Nursery Road heads south from the intersection as a county highway toward the village of Street. The state highway heads north as two-lane undivided Graceton Road through residences on large lots and farmland and crosses Broad Creek. After intersecting MD 136 (Whiteford Road) in the hamlet of Graceton, MD 624 curves to the west to meet its northern terminus on a tangent with the Pennsylvania state line. Graceton Road continues west on top of the state line as SR 2080 to an intersection with PA 851 near Fawn Grove.

== History ==
MD 624 was constructed in 1936. The state highway has not changed since except for minor improvements.

== Junction list ==
The entire route is in Harford County.

Location	mi	km	Destinations	Notes
Pylesville	0.00	0.00	MD 165 (Pylesville Road) / Grier Nursery Road south – Jarrettsville, Whiteford	Southern terminus
Graceton	2.73	4.39	MD 136 (Whiteford Road) – Whiteford, Norrisville	
Graceton	3.02	4.86	SR 2080 west (Graceton Road) – Fawn Grove	Pennsylvania state line; northern terminus
1.000 mi = 1.609 km; 1.000 km = 0.621 mi
