= Tom Galbreath =

American football and baseball player (1876–1916)

Biographical details
- Born: July 28, 1876; Jarrettsville, Maryland, U.S.
- Died: July 24, 1916 (aged 39); Estes Park, Colorado, U.S.

Playing career

Football
- 1892–1895: McDaniel

Baseball
- 1893–1896: McDaniel

Coaching career (HC unless noted)

Football
- 1896–1898: McDaniel

Thomas Crawford Galbreath (July 28, 1876 – July 24, 1916) was an American football and baseball player. He served as the head football coach at Western Maryland College (now McDaniel College) from 1896 to 1898. He attended Harvard University from 1902 to 1903.

== Early life ==
Thomas Crawford Galbreath was born in 1876 to J. Wilson Galbreath. He grew up near Jarrettsville, Maryland, and attended local public schools, including North Bend School. He graduated from Western Maryland College with a Bachelor of Arts in 1895 and a Master of Arts in 1898. He pursued a PhD at Harvard University.

== Career ==
Galbreath taught two years in Harford County. He then taught two years at Western Maryland College. He was appointed as school treasurer and examiner of Harford County in 1899 and remained in that role until his resignation in 1902 to attend Harvard University. In 1899, he was the coach of the newly formed Bel Air Football Team.

In the summer of 1903, Galbreath contracted pulmonary tuberculosis. He then moved to Colorado to recover from the disease. He wrote short stories and poems for magazines, as well as two books. He wrote "Chasing the Cure in Colorado" and "T. B.", which discussed prevention and treatment of tuberculosis.

== Personal life ==
Galbreath married Elizabeth McNeal of Denver in November 1914. He died on July 24, 1916, at Aloha Lodge in Estes Park, Colorado. He was buried in Harford County.
