= Whiteford–Cardiff Historic District =

Historic district in Maryland, United States

- U.S. National Register of Historic Places
- U.S. Historic district
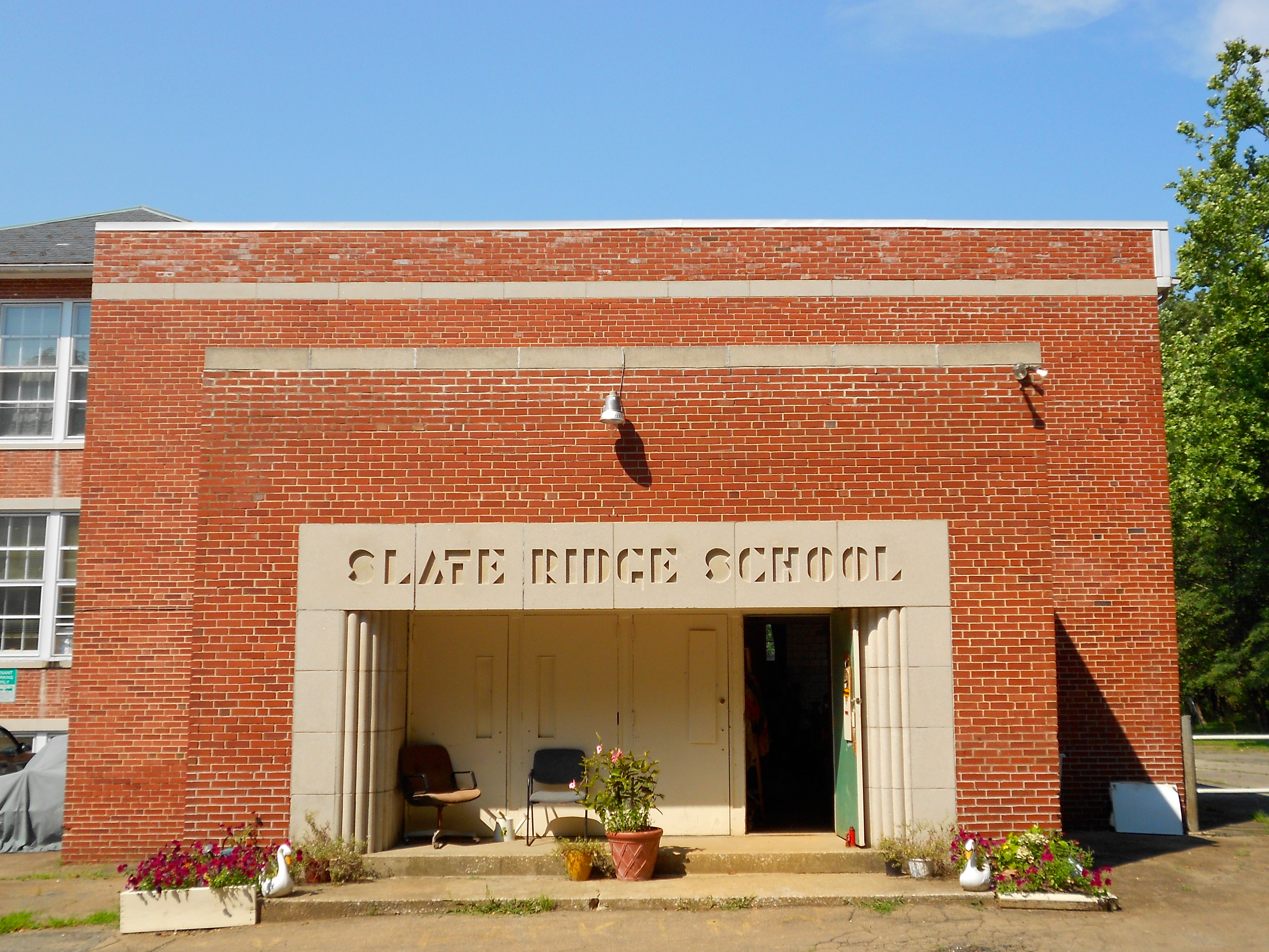
- Art Deco gym or meeting hall attached to older Slate Ridge School (now an apartment building)

- Location within Maryland Location within the United States
- Location: MD-PA, Whiteford Rd., Platted Parry St., Quarry Rd., W of Main St., Whiteford, Maryland
- Coordinates: 39°42′56″N 76°20′19″W
- Area: 311 acres (126 ha)
- Built by: Simonson, Otto G.
- Architectural style: Late Victorian, Colonial Revival
- NRHP reference No.: 05001278
- Added to NRHP: November 15, 2005

Whiteford–Cardiff Historic District is a national historic district at Cardiff and Whiteford, Harford County, Maryland, United States. It encompasses portions of two communities in northern Harford County that were historically associated with slate production during the late 19th and early 20th centuries. It contains 140 contributing resources including four vernacular Welsh cottages dating to about 1850. The Whiteford–Cardiff area is noted for its strong Welsh ethnic identity, which is reflected in the architecture of the area.

It was added to the National Register of Historic Places in 2005.

== See also ==
- Cambria, Maryland
