= Maryland Route 755 =

Highway in Maryland, United States

Maryland Route 755
- Edgewood Road

Route information
- Maintained by MDSHA
- Length: 1.79 mi (2.88 km)
- Existed: 1970–present

Major junctions
- South end: Entrance to Aberdeen Proving Ground
- MD 24 in Edgewood
- North end: US 40 in Edgewood

Location
- Country: United States
- State: Maryland
- Counties: Harford

Highway system
- Maryland highway system; Interstate; US; State; Scenic Byways
← MD 750	→ MD 756

Maryland Route 755 (MD 755) is a state highway in Harford County in the U.S. state of Maryland. Known as Edgewood Road, the state highway runs 1.79 mi (2.88 km) from an entrance to Aberdeen Proving Ground north to U.S. Route 40 (US 40) in Edgewood. Originally constructed as MD 408 in 1930, the state highway became a southern extension of MD 24 in the early 1950s. MD 755 was designated in the early 1970s after MD 24 moved to its present course.

== Route description ==
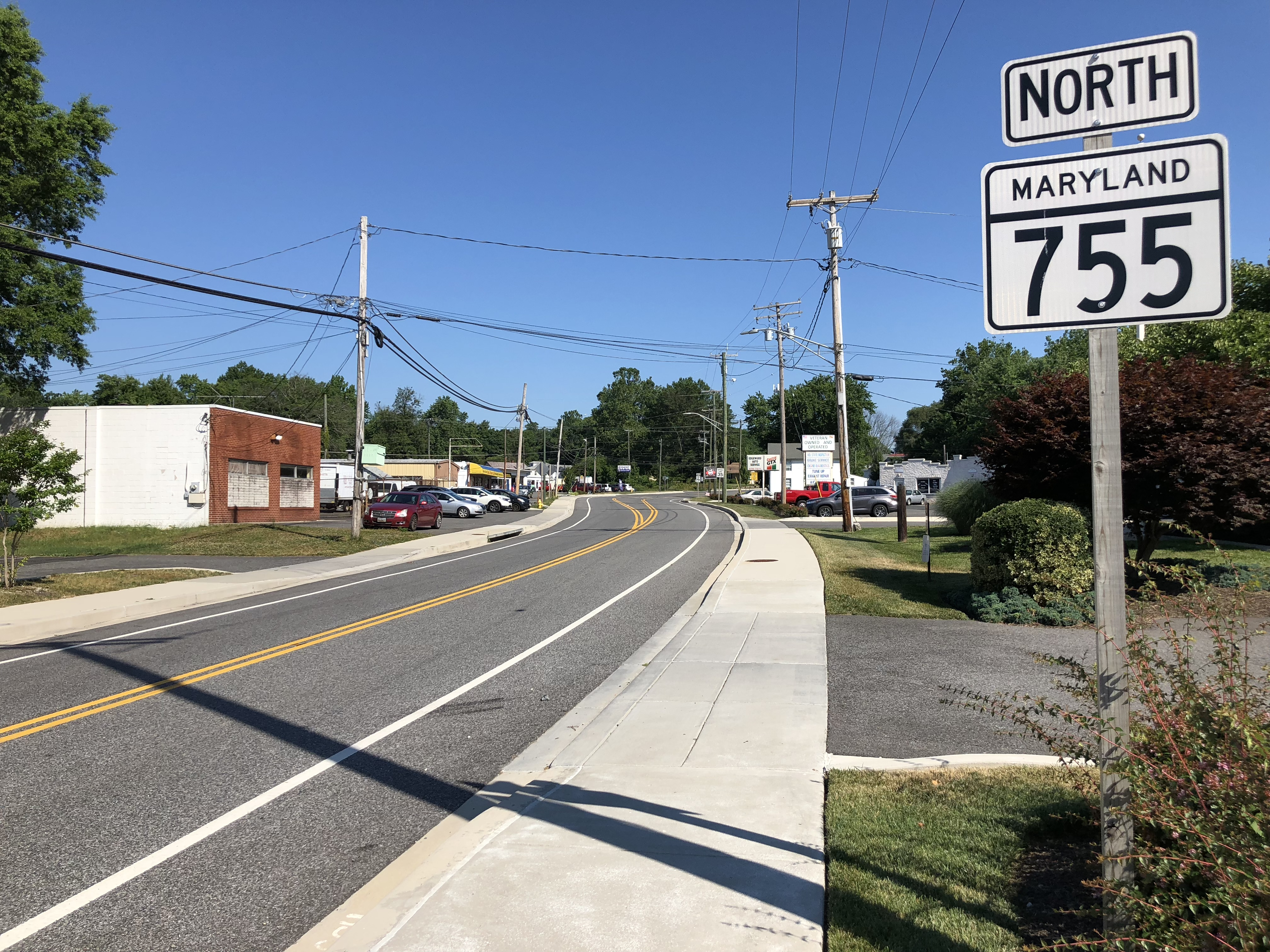
View north along MD 755 in Edgewood

MD 755 begins at an entrance to the Edgewood Area of Aberdeen Proving Ground; the highway continues south into the military installation as Wise Road. This gate is open from 6:00 am to 6:00 pm on weekdays and allows entry for persons with a Government ID; visitors to the Edgewood Area of Aberdeen Proving Ground must use the gate along MD 24. The state highway heads north as a two-lane undivided road that passes under Amtrak's Northeast Corridor railroad line and passes by two entrances to the Edgewood station, which is a stop on MARC's Penn Line. After leaving the village of Edgewood and passing Trimble Road, MD 755 expands to a three-lane road with a center left-turn lane. The state highway continues north through residential subdivisions until an acute intersection with MD 24 (Emmorton Road). Beyond that intersection, MD 755 expands to a four-lane undivided highway and enters a commercial area before reaching its northern terminus at US 40 (Pulaski Highway). Edgewood Road continues north as a two-lane county highway that crosses Winters Run, has a one-lane underpass of CSX's Philadelphia Subdivision railroad line, and intersects MD 7 before veering northeast to another intersection with MD 24 just south of Interstate 95 (I-95).

MD 755 is a part of the National Highway System as an intermodal connector between the Edgewood MARC station and MD 24.

== History ==
Edgewood Road was built as a concrete road from US 40 (now MD 7) in the community of Van Bibber south to its entrance to Aberdeen Proving Ground at its Pennsylvania Railroad crossing (now Amtrak) in 1930. The state highway, which was initially designated MD 408, was constructed with a width of 16 feet (4.9 m) but was proposed for widening to 20 feet (6.1 m) as early as 1934 since it was the main entrance to the Edgewood Arsenal. MD 408 received an underpass of the Baltimore and Ohio Railroad (now CSX) and approaches to the grade separation in 1939. MD 24 assumed all of MD 408 when MD 24 was extended south from MD 7 to Aberdeen Proving Ground in 1952. A new section of Edgewood Road was constructed from MD 7 north to just south of the future I-95 interchange in 1956 to remove MD 24's staggered intersections at MD 7 in Van Bibber.

The subsequent relocation of MD 24 in the Edgewood area occurred in two sections starting in 1967. MD 24 was moved to its present alignment from just south of the I-95 interchange to Edgewood Road south of US 40 in 1970. The bypass included a bridge over US 40; access between the two highways was provided by Edgewood Road, which was designated MD 755. The new alignment of MD 24 was extended south to a new entrance to Aberdeen Proving Ground in 1974; MD 755 was extended south along MD 24's old alignment to the pre-existing entrance next to the Edgewood train station. MD 755 achieved its present length around 1991 when the portion of Edgewood Road north of US 40 was transferred to county maintenance.

== Junction list ==
The entire route is in Edgewood, Harford County.

mi	km	Destinations	Notes
0.00	0.00	Entrance to Aberdeen Proving Ground	Southern terminus
1.56	2.51	MD 24 (Emmorton Road) to I-95 – Edgewood Area Aberdeen Proving Ground, Bel Air	
1.79	2.88	US 40 (Pulaski Highway) / Edgewood Road north – Baltimore, Aberdeen	Northern terminus
1.000 mi = 1.609 km; 1.000 km = 0.621 mi
