= Nelson-Reardon-Kennard House =

Historic house in Maryland, United States

- U.S. National Register of Historic Places
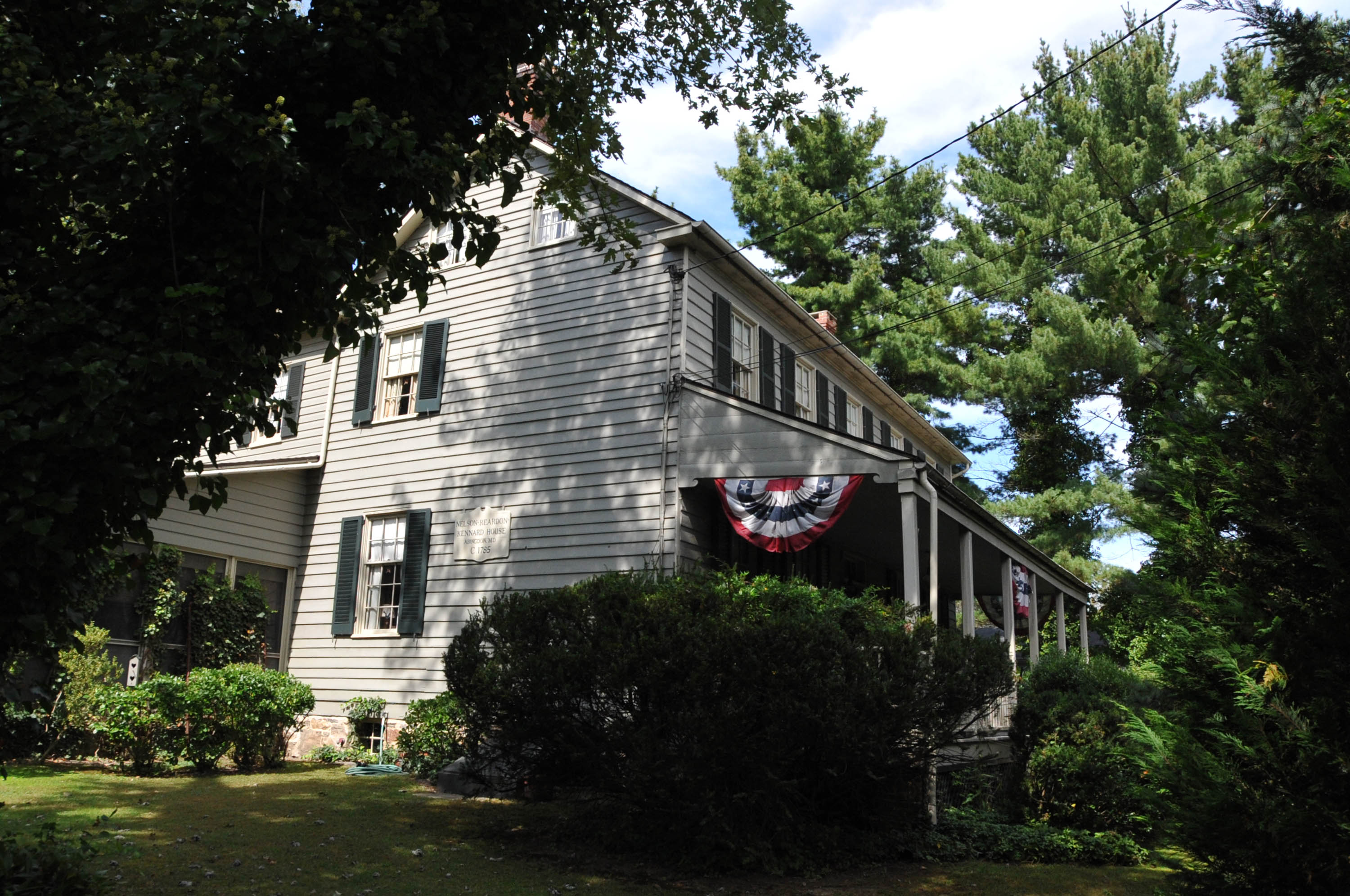
- Nelson-Reardon-Kennard House in 2008

- Location within Maryland Location within the United States
- Location: 3604 Philadelphia Rd., Abingdon, Maryland
- Coordinates: 39°27′51″N 76°16′45″W
- Area: 2.5 acres (1.0 ha)
- Built: 1785
- Built by: Bull, Jacob
- Architectural style: Federal, I-house
- NRHP reference No.: 91000001
- Added to NRHP: April 15, 1991

The Nelson-Reardon-Kennard House, also known as the Methodist Parsonage, is a historic home located at Abingdon, Harford County, Maryland, United States. It is a two-part frame house, with a five-bay, two-story front section built about 1785 and a three-bay, one-room rear service wing. The front porch dates to 1888. It is the oldest documented frame dwelling in Harford County.

The Nelson-Reardon-Kennard House was listed on the National Register of Historic Places in 1991.
