= Abingdon, Maryland =

- census-designated place
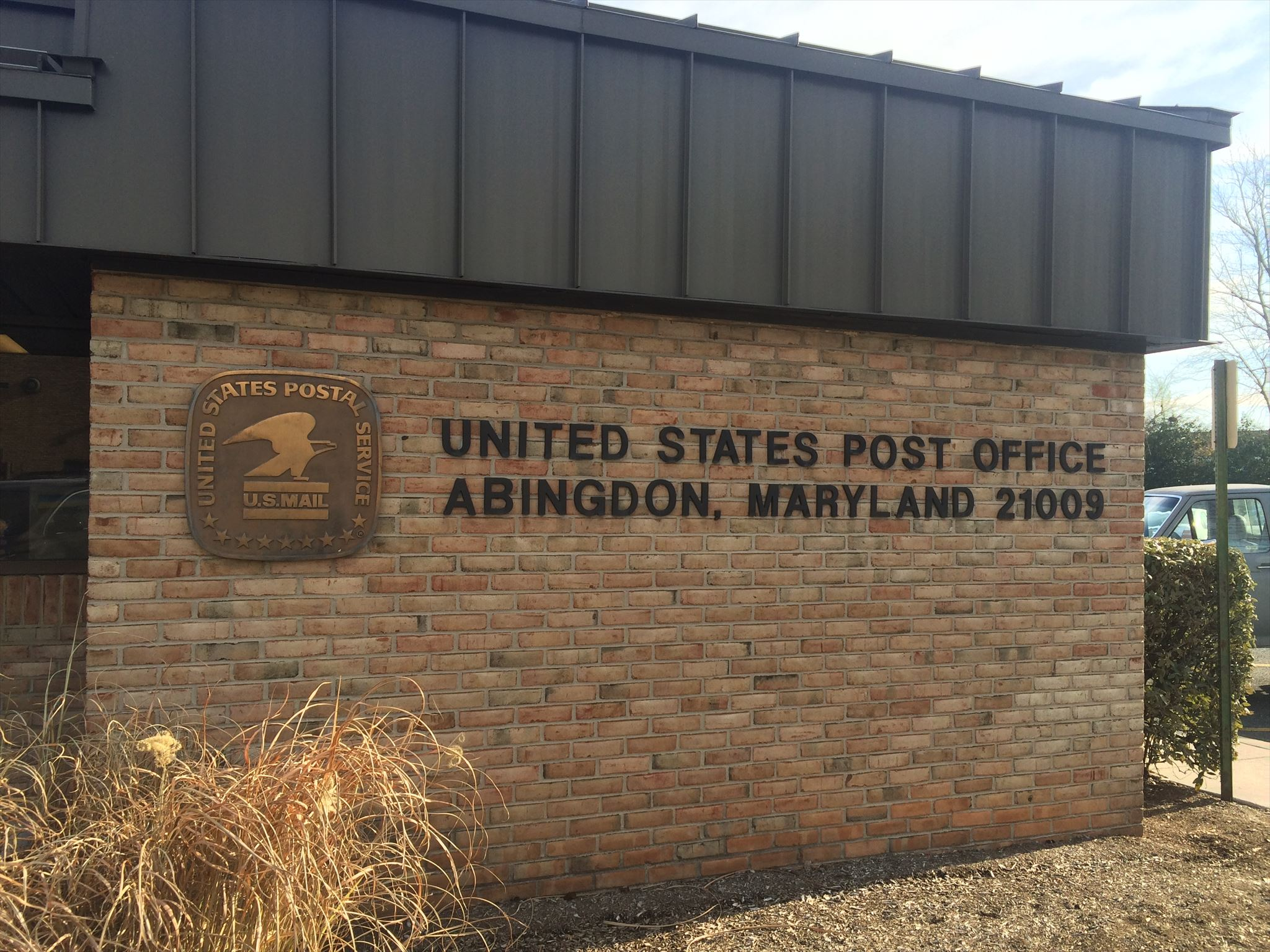
- Abingdon Post Office in 2016

- Location within Maryland Location within the United States
- Coordinates: 39°28.0′N 76°16.9′W
- Country: United States
- State: Maryland
- County: Harford

Area
  - Total: 2.78 sq mi (7.19 km^{2})
  - Land: 2.76 sq mi (7.15 km^{2})
  - Water: 0.012 sq mi (0.03 km^{2})
- Elevation: 167 ft (51 m)

Population (2020)
  - Total: 4,826
  - Density: 1,747.0/sq mi (674.53/km^{2})
- Time zone: UTC-5 (EST)
  - Summer (DST): UTC-4 (EDT)
- ZIP code: 21009
- FIPS code: 24-00200

Abingdon is a census-designated place in Harford County, Maryland, United States. It lies 25 miles (40 km) northeast of Baltimore on Maryland Route 7, near the Bush River, between Exits 77 (MD 24) and 80 (MD 543) of Interstate 95.

== Demographics ==
Historical population
Census	Pop.	Note	%±
2020	4,826		—
U.S. Decennial Census

=== 2020 census ===
As of the 2020 census, Abingdon had a population of 4,826. The median age was 40.3 years. 22.4% of residents were under the age of 18 and 12.0% of residents were 65 years of age or older. For every 100 females there were 98.0 males, and for every 100 females age 18 and over there were 96.3 males age 18 and over.

100.0% of residents lived in urban areas, while 0.0% lived in rural areas.

There were 1,661 households in Abingdon, of which 35.3% had children under the age of 18 living in them. Of all households, 61.6% were married-couple households, 12.6% were households with a male householder and no spouse or partner present, and 19.6% were households with a female householder and no spouse or partner present. About 17.1% of all households were made up of individuals and 5.2% had someone living alone who was 65 years of age or older.

There were 1,744 housing units, of which 4.8% were vacant. The homeowner vacancy rate was 1.5% and the rental vacancy rate was 9.4%.

Racial composition as of the 2020 census
Race	Number	Percent
White	2,652	55.0%
Black or African American	1,546	32.0%
American Indian and Alaska Native	28	0.6%
Asian	185	3.8%
Native Hawaiian and Other Pacific Islander	3	0.1%
Some other race	133	2.8%
Two or more races	279	5.8%
Hispanic or Latino (of any race)	266	5.5%

== History ==
Abingdon was named after Abingdon, England. Abingdon was laid out in 1779 by John Paca, father of William Paca, a signer of the Declaration of Independence and Maryland's third governor. Abingdon was the site of Cokesbury College, the first Methodist college in the United States.

Woodside was listed on the National Register of Historic Places in 1979. The Nelson-Reardon-Kennard House was listed in 1991.

Abingdon changed from an unincorporated community to a census-designated place for the 2020 census.

== Schools ==
Public schools in Abingdon are operated by Harford County Public Schools (HCPS). The school system is overseen by the Harford County Board of Education, which includes six elected members, three members appointed by the Harford County Executive, and a student member.

Elementary schools in the Abingdon area include Abingdon Elementary School, William S. James Elementary School, and Old Post Road Elementary School. Public school assignments are determined by residential attendance boundaries established by HCPS.
