= Woodside (Abingdon, Maryland) =

Historic house in Maryland, United States

- U.S. National Register of Historic Places
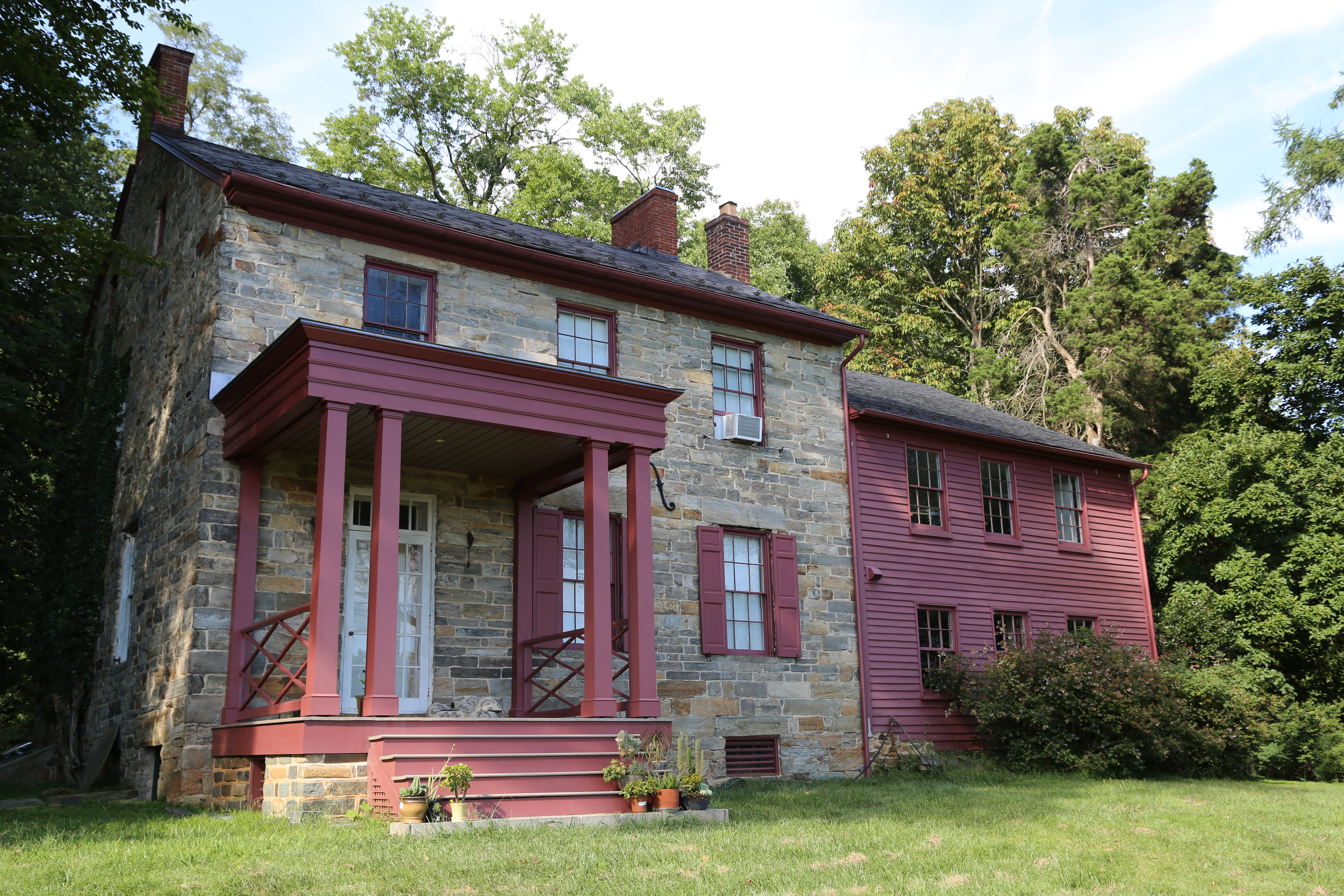
- Woodside, 2014

- Location within Maryland Location within the United States
- Location: 400 Singer Road, Abingdon, Maryland
- Coordinates: 39°28′47″N 76°19′22″W
- Area: 44 acres (18 ha)
- Built: 1823
- Architectural style: Federal, Hall and double parlor plan
- NRHP reference No.: 79001134
- Added to NRHP: November 1, 1979

Woodside is a historic home located at Abingdon, Harford County, Maryland. It has a 2 1/2-story main section, designed in 1823, that is an excellent example of a Federal side hall, double parlor plan house. The house is constructed of coursed fieldstone and ashlar. The property includes a stone house with overhanging gable roof, a hand pump, a shed-roofed frame storage building, an 1848 log barn, a 1928 frame corn crib, and three early 20th century garages.

It was listed on the National Register of Historic Places in 1979.
