= Forest Hill, Maryland =

Unincorporated community in Maryland, United States

- Unincorporated community
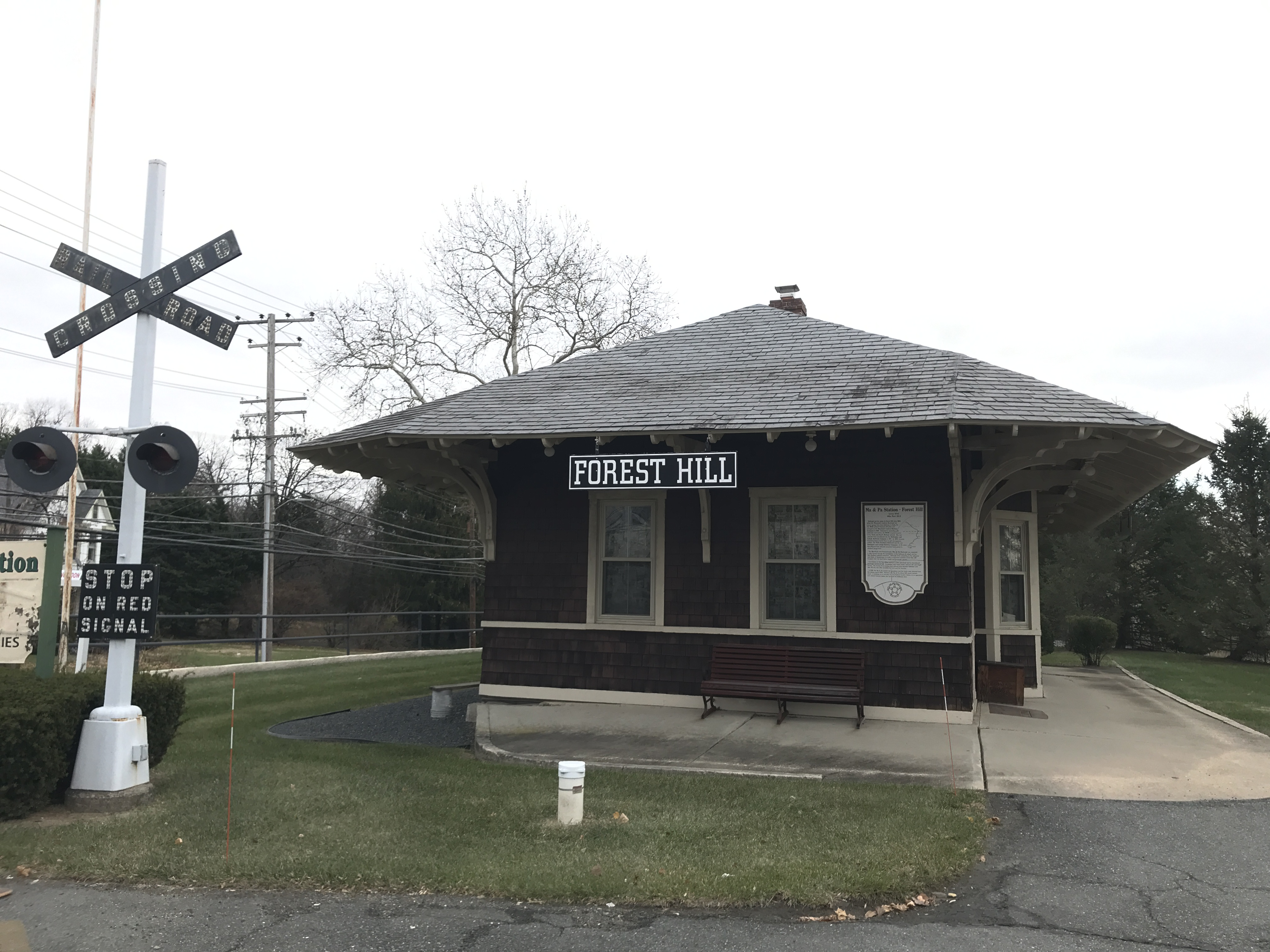
- Forest Hill Train Station along the former Ma & Pa Railroad (December 2021)

- Location within Maryland Location within the United States
- Coordinates: 39°35′06″N 76°23′16″W
- Country: United States
- State: Maryland
- County: Harford
- Elevation: 577 ft (176 m)

Population (2021)
  - Total: 18,202
- Time zone: UTC-5 (Eastern (EST))
  - Summer (DST): UTC-4 (EDT)
- ZIP code: 21050
- Area codes: 410, 443
- FIPS code: 24-24025
- GNIS feature ID: 584446
- Other name: Foresthill

Forest Hill is an unincorporated community in Harford County, Maryland, United States, located north of the county seat of Bel Air. The main part of town is located at the intersection of Maryland Route 24 and Jarrettsville Road (former Maryland Route 23). Until 1958, this community was served by the Maryland and Pennsylvania Railroad at milepost 30.3.

Forest Hill's ZIP code area covers a relatively large area, with rural land on one side and suburban neighborhoods on the other. The latter is part of the Bel Air suburbs.

St. Ignatius Church was listed on the National Register of Historic Places in 1974.

== Geography ==
Forest Hill is located at 39°35′06″N 76°23′16″W (39.585106, -76.387739). Its elevation is 577 feet (176 m).

== Demographics ==
At the 2000 census there were 14,951 people (7,234 men and 7,717 women) and 5,459 housing units in the Forest Hill area. The town's land area is 29.89 square miles (77.4 km^{2}).
