= Cambria, Maryland =

Populated place in Maryland, U.S.

Coordinates: 39°42′40″N 76°20′56″W

Cambria is a populated place in Harford County, Maryland, northwest of Whiteford.

Many slate quarries were in operation to the southeast of Cambria in the 1800s. The region was known as the Peach Bottom Slate area.

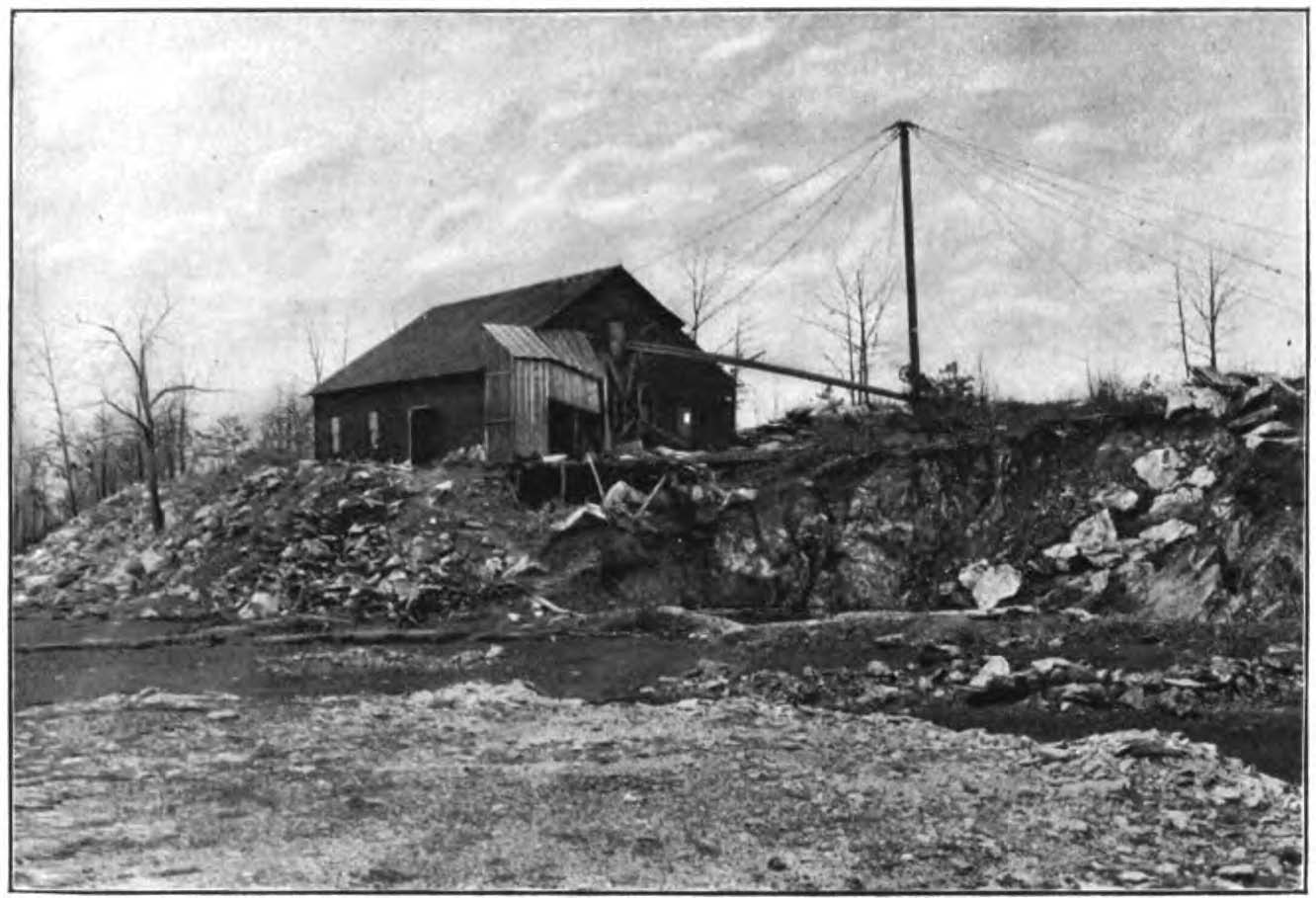
Whiteford Quarry, Cambria, c. 1898

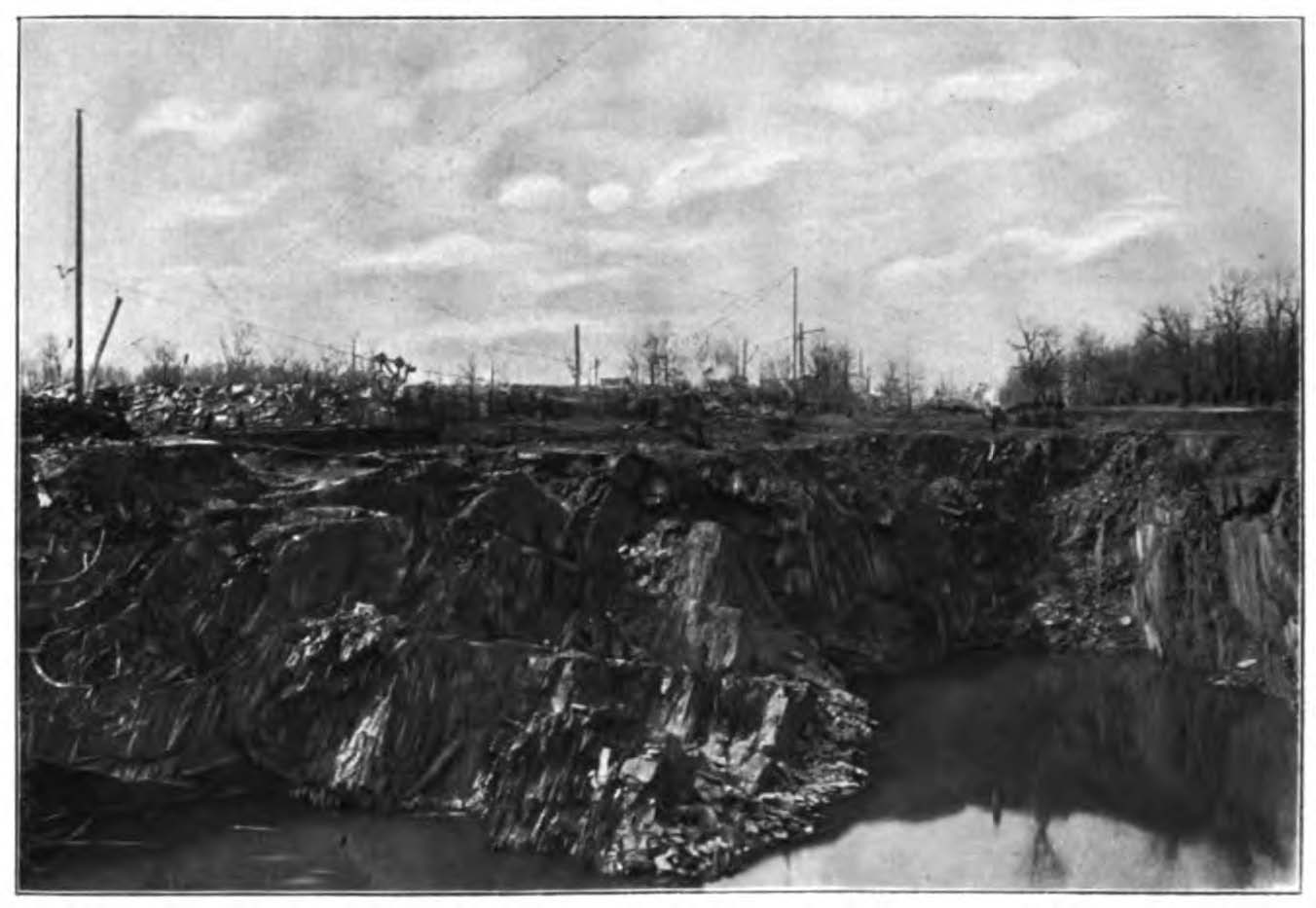
York and Peachbottom Quarry, Cambria, c. 1898

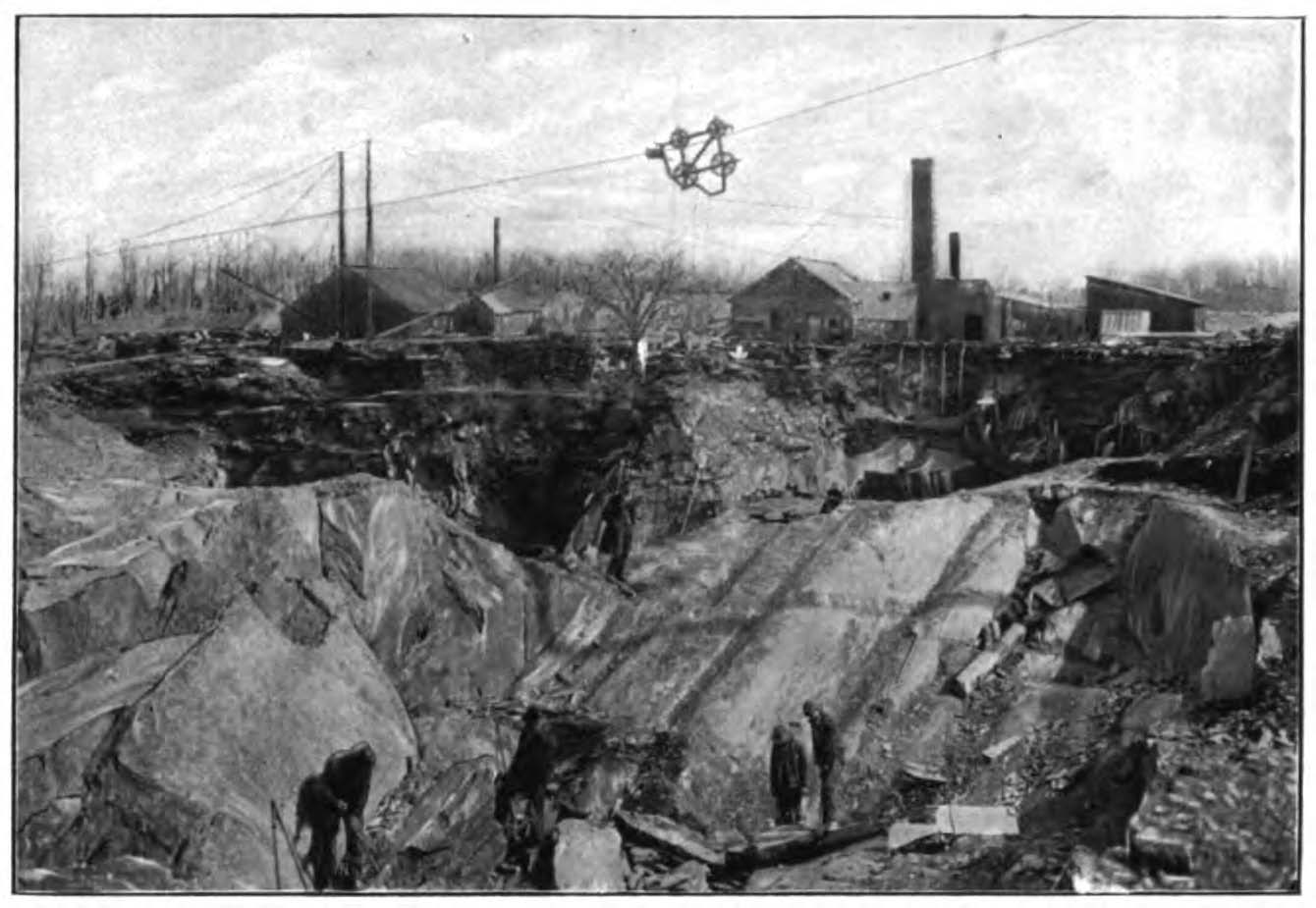
York and Peachbottom Quarry, Cambria, c. 1898

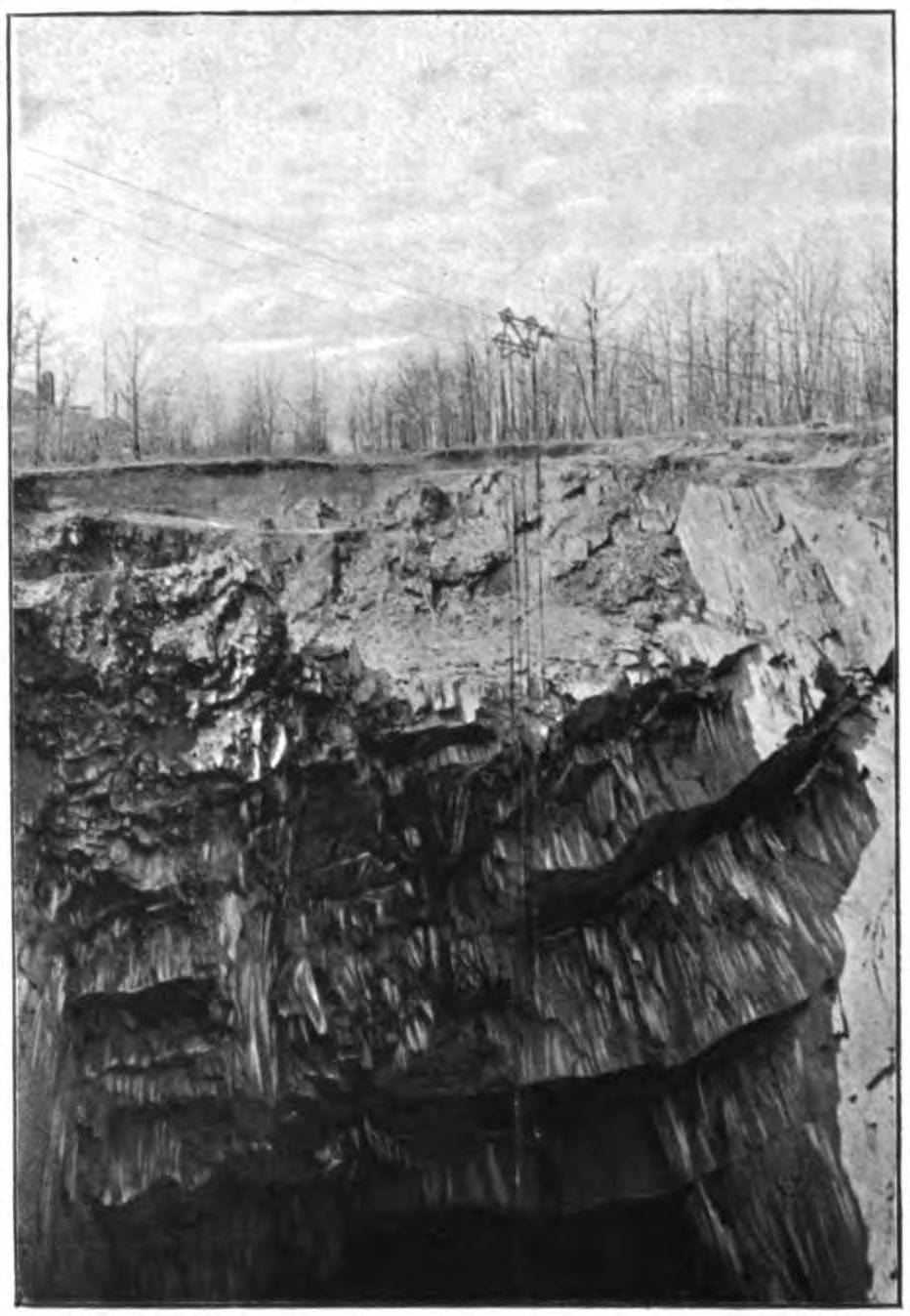
Proctor Brothers' Quarry, Cambria, c. 1898

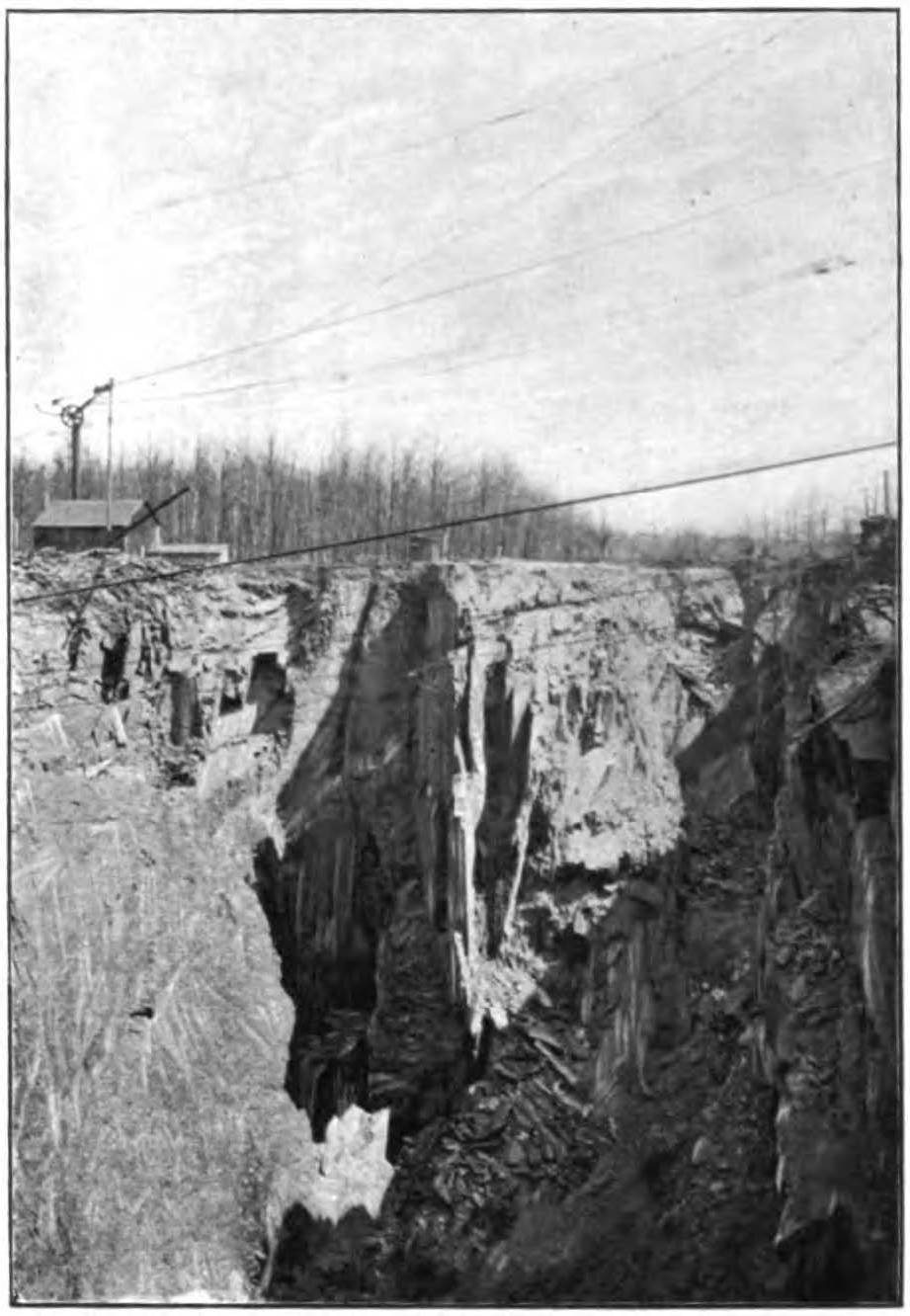
Peachbottom-Excelsior-Peerless Quarry, Cambria, c. 1898
