= Cardiff, Maryland =

Unincorporated community in Maryland, U.S.

Coordinates: 39°43′02″N 76°20′16″W

Cardiff is an unincorporated community in Harford County, Maryland, United States. The zip code for the area is 21160. The community name is taken from the Capital city of Wales.

== Geography ==
Cardiff is located directly on the Mason–Dixon line, or Maryland - Pennsylvania border. It borders the incorporated town of Delta, Pennsylvania. It connects to the village of Whiteford, and is a short distance away from the areas of Street and Pylesville.

== Commerce ==
All businesses are on Main Street, which runs from Whiteford to the Pennsylvania border, or Dooley Road, running from Main Street to Route 165. The town has a post office, several shops, garages, and churches, a fire hall, a general store, and a new supermarket.

== History ==
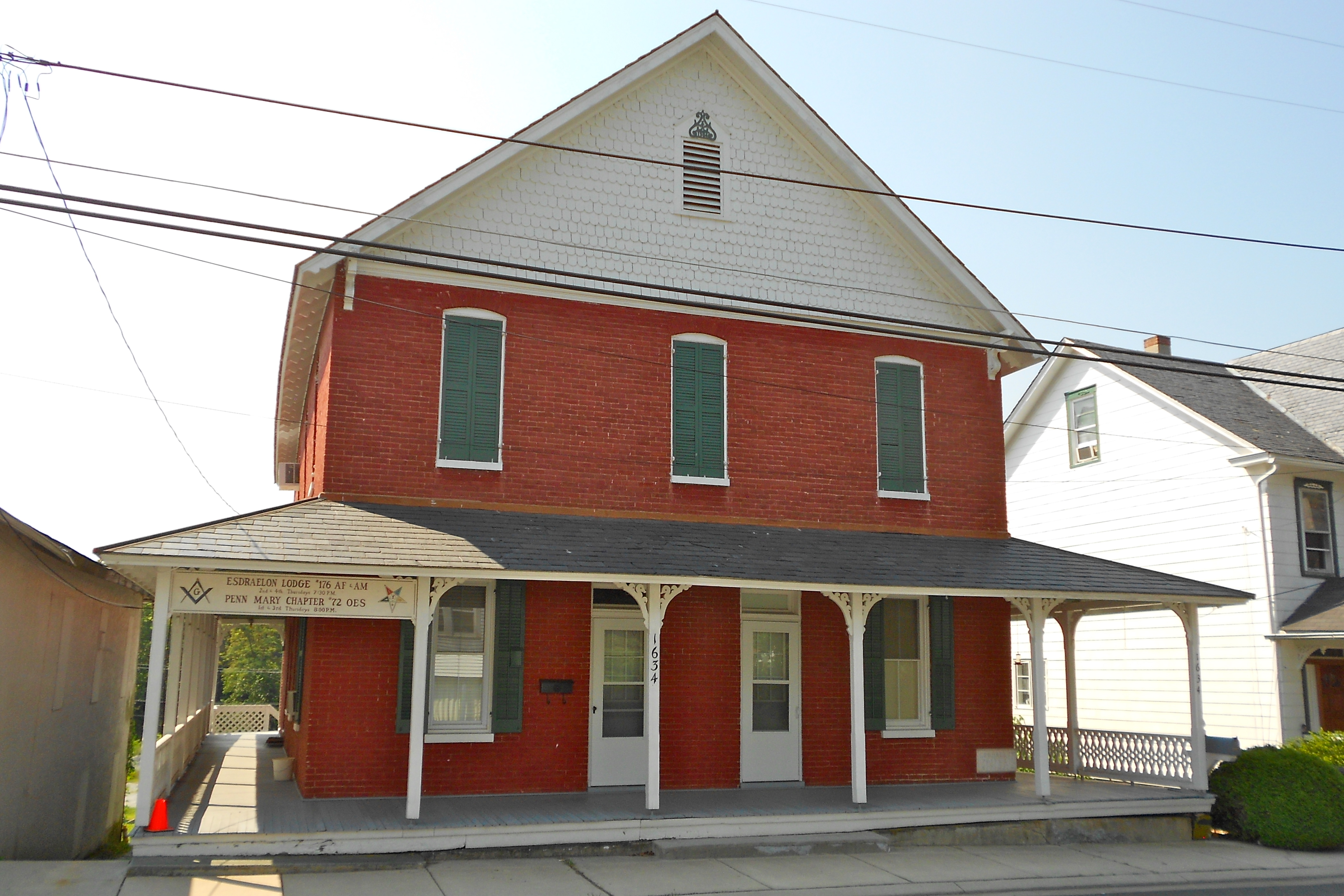
The Mason's building in the Whiteford–Cardiff Historic District on Main Street Cardiff, Maryland

Cardiff is located in a highly slate-rich region, which created the town's early industries. Cardiff was formerly the mining center of Harford County. The mines and quarries have all but shut down now, and the town has become a farming hub.

According to geologist Jeri Jones:

One cannot talk about the Delta area without including the Cardiff Marble Company, just south of Delta in Cardiff, Maryland. The site was famous for its own mineral resource, "Green Marble" or what geologists term a serpentinite. The greenish rock is a metamorphic rock consisting wholly of serpentine minerals commonly derived from the alteration of peridotite. In turn, peridotite is a coarse-grained igneous rock formed very deep inside the earth. The operation was originally a quarry being used for road construction, but in 1913, a blast exposed a piece of the serpentinite. The quarry sent the rock to Baltimore for polishing, after which it was determined that a new resource has been discovered. After changing their equipment to concentrate on the beautiful rock, rapid expansion of the quarry started. At the completion of the operation in the early 1970's, the shaft extended to a depth of over 300 feet with numerous tunnels at various levels. Huge blocks of the serpentinite were lifted out by horst and cable, similar to the slate operations, and removed to the saws in nearby buildings. The rock was used for decorative stone, lamp bases, table tops, fireplaces, and desk ornaments. The rock was used as decorative stone in the Empire State Building in New York City, the Department of Highways Building in Harrisburg, along with the bottom of the walls in City Hall in York, PA and in numerous federal buildings in Washington, D.C.

Formerly home of Slate Ridge Elementary School, shut down in the early 1980s, the building is now used for apartments.

The town, a part of the Whiteford-Cardiff Historic District, was added to the National Register of Historic Places in 2005. The town and historic district are notable for their strong Welsh ethnic heritage, which is reflected in the name of the town as well as the local architecture, and the Welsh language choir of some renown based nearby.
