= Slate Ridge School =

Historic school building in Maryland, United States

- U.S. National Register of Historic Places
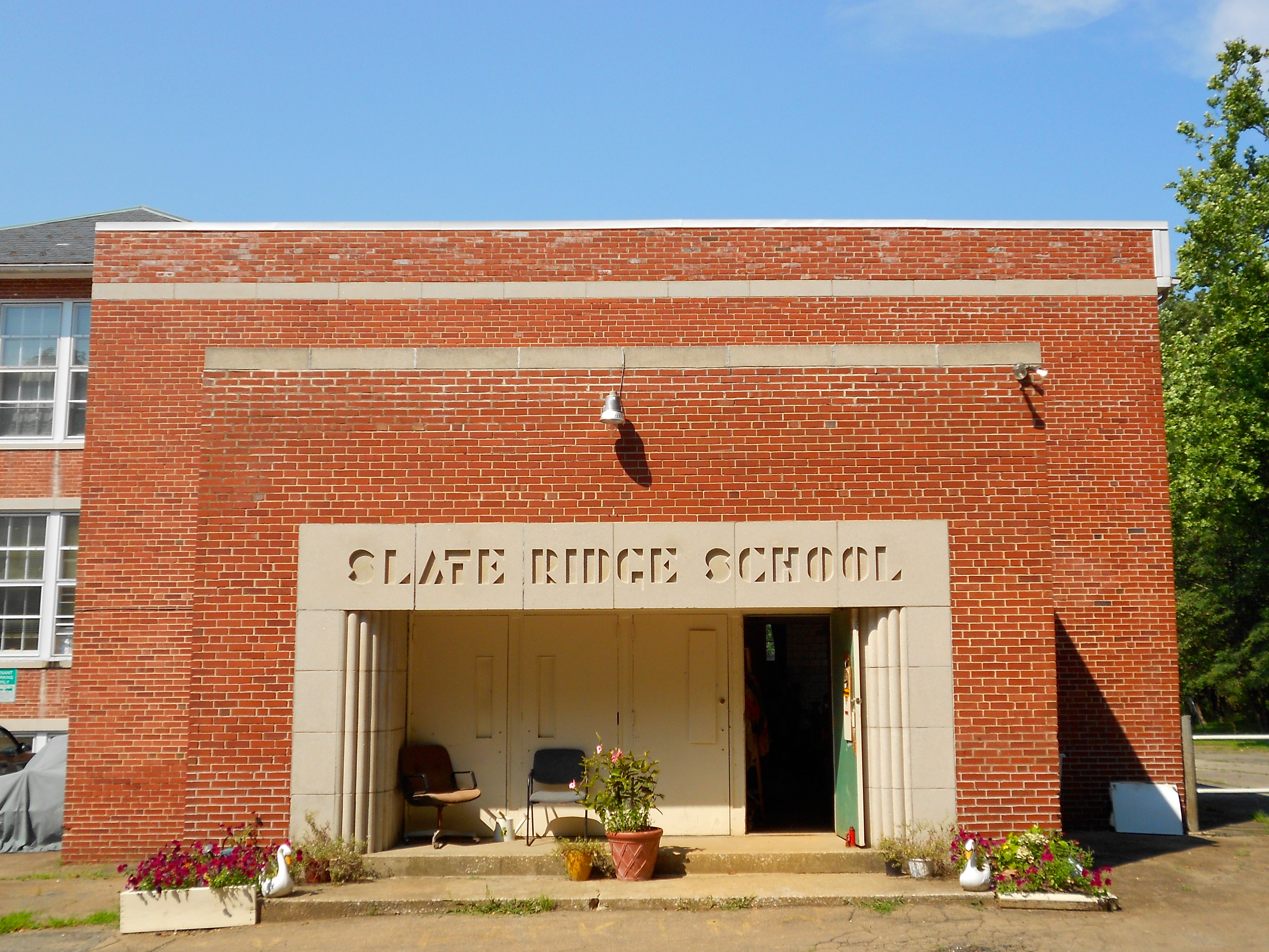
- Former Slate Ridge school, 2008

- Location within Maryland Location within the United States
- Location: 1557 Old Pylesville Road (1557 Main Street), Whiteford, Maryland
- Coordinates: 39°42′45″N 76°20′25″W
- Area: 3.5 acres (1.4 ha)
- Built: 1912
- Architect: Shanahan, D.J.; Simonson, Otto G.
- NRHP reference No.: 87000657
- Added to NRHP: July 16, 1987

Slate Ridge School is a historic school located at Whiteford, Harford County, Maryland. The main block of the building is two stories, constructed of brick with a slate hip roof and a small wooden cupola in the center. It was built in 1912, and designed by the Baltimore architect Otto Simonson. A narrow hyphen containing a stairwell and corridor connects the main block to a similar two-story rectangular block and a one-story wing containing a stage and gymnasium, added just after World War II. It was used until about 1980.

It was listed on the National Register of Historic Places in 1987.
