= Jarrettsville, Maryland =

- Census-designated place
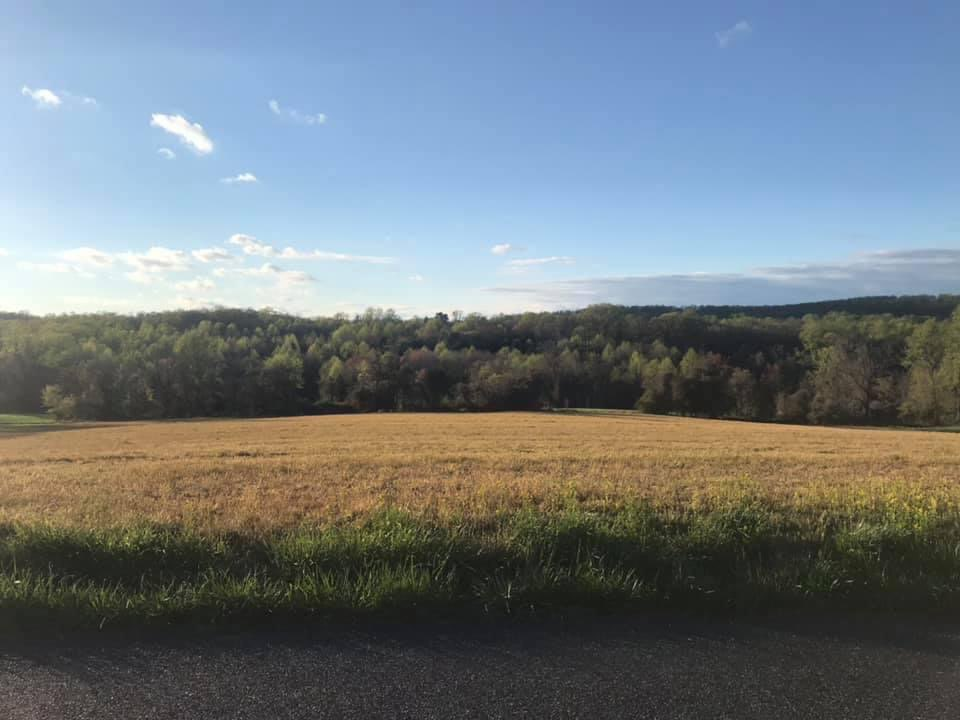
- Chrome Hill Road (2021)

- Location of Jarrettsville, Maryland
- Coordinates: 39°36′17″N 76°28′40″W
- Country: United States
- State: Maryland
- County: Harford

Area
  - Total: 8.66 sq mi (22.43 km^{2})
  - Land: 8.64 sq mi (22.37 km^{2})
  - Water: 0.027 sq mi (0.07 km^{2})
- Elevation: 669 ft (204 m)

Population (2020)
  - Total: 2,888
  - Density: 334.4/sq mi (129.13/km^{2})
- Time zone: UTC−5 (Eastern (EST))
  - Summer (DST): UTC−4 (EDT)
- ZIP code: 21084
- Area code: 410
- FIPS code: 24-42325
- GNIS feature ID: 0585205

Jarrettsville is an unincorporated community and census-designated place (CDP) in Harford County, Maryland, United States. The population was 2,888 at the 2020 census.

== History ==
The area was originally called Carmon. The town was named for the Jarrett family, who farmed the area during the 1800s and were one of the first pioneer families of the United States. In 1771, Abraham Jarrett was granted 2,380 acres of land near the falling branch area to which was used for the production of hogshead barrels mainly used for the transportation of tobacco. In the same year Abraham Jarrett purchased other areas in and around the Jarrettsville area. Abraham Jarrett married Martha Bussey and had 7 children. My Lady's Manor was listed on the National Register of Historic Places in 1978, and includes portions of Jarrettsville. Other sources attribute the naming of Jarrettsville to the grandson of Abraham Jarrett, Luther M. Jarrett, a state delegate and farmer.

== Geography ==
Jarrettsville is located in northwestern Harford County at 39°36′7″N 76°28′21″W (39.601954, −76.472404). Maryland Route 23 passes through the center of the town, leading southeast 9 miles (14 km) to Bel Air, the county seat, and northwest 12 miles (19 km) to the Pennsylvania border north of Norrisville. Maryland Route 165 passes through the center of Jarrettsville as well, leading northeast 12 miles to the Pennsylvania border near Cardiff and south 8 miles (13 km) to Baldwin. Jarrettsville is 30 miles (48 km) northeast of downtown Baltimore.

According to the United States Census Bureau, the CDP has a total area of 8.6 square miles (22.4 km^{2}), of which 0.03 square miles (0.07 km^{2}), or 0.29%, are water.

== Demographics ==
Historical population
Census	Pop.	Note	%±
2020	2,888		—
U.S. Decennial Census

=== 2020 census ===
As of the 2020 census, Jarrettsville had a population of 2,888. The median age was 47.1 years. 21.2% of residents were under the age of 18 and 19.9% of residents were 65 years of age or older. For every 100 females there were 95.3 males, and for every 100 females age 18 and over there were 93.1 males age 18 and over.

0.0% of residents lived in urban areas, while 100.0% lived in rural areas.

There were 1,018 households in Jarrettsville, of which 30.4% had children under the age of 18 living in them. Of all households, 70.7% were married-couple households, 11.1% were households with a male householder and no spouse or partner present, and 14.2% were households with a female householder and no spouse or partner present. About 14.1% of all households were made up of individuals and 9.1% had someone living alone who was 65 years of age or older.

There were 1,059 housing units, of which 3.9% were vacant. The homeowner vacancy rate was 0.7% and the rental vacancy rate was 4.2%.

Racial composition as of the 2020 census
Race	Number	Percent
White	2,641	91.4%
Black or African American	52	1.8%
American Indian and Alaska Native	2	0.1%
Asian	19	0.7%
Native Hawaiian and Other Pacific Islander	1	0.0%
Some other race	11	0.4%
Two or more races	162	5.6%
Hispanic or Latino (of any race)	56	1.9%

=== 2000 census ===
As of the census of 2000, there were 2,756 people, 900 households, and 781 families residing in the CDP. The population density was 315.8 inhabitants per square mile (121.9/km^{2}). There were 918 housing units at an average density of 105.2 per square mile (40.6/km^{2}). The racial makeup of the CDP was 97.21% White, 1.16% African American, 0.15% Native American, 0.29% Asian, 0.33% from other races, and 0.87% from two or more races. Hispanic or Latino of any race were 0.54% of the population.

There were 900 households, out of which 43.7% had children under the age of 18 living with them, 77.6% were married couples living together, 6.4% had a female householder with no husband present, and 13.2% were non-families. 11.1% of all households were made up of individuals, and 5.4% had someone living alone who was 65 years of age or older. The average household size was 3.05 and the average family size was 3.30.

In the CDP, the population was spread out, with 28.9% under the age of 18, 6.5% from 18 to 24, 26.4% from 25 to 44, 29.0% from 45 to 64, and 9.2% who were 65 years of age or older. The median age was 39 years. For every 100 females, there were 101.3 males. For every 100 females age 18 and over, there were 97.3 males.

The median income for a household in the CDP was $69,632, and the median income for a family was $81,771. Males had a median income of $51,524 versus $31,905 for females. The per capita income for the CDP was $29,246. None of the families and 1.4% of the population were living below the poverty line, including no under eighteens and 11.6% of those over 64.

== Notable people ==
- Mel Kiper Jr. (born 1960) – ESPN NFL draft day analyst
- Randy McMillan (born 1958) – former NFL running back with the Baltimore/Indianapolis Colts
