= Fawn Grove, Pennsylvania =

Borough in Pennsylvania, US

- Borough
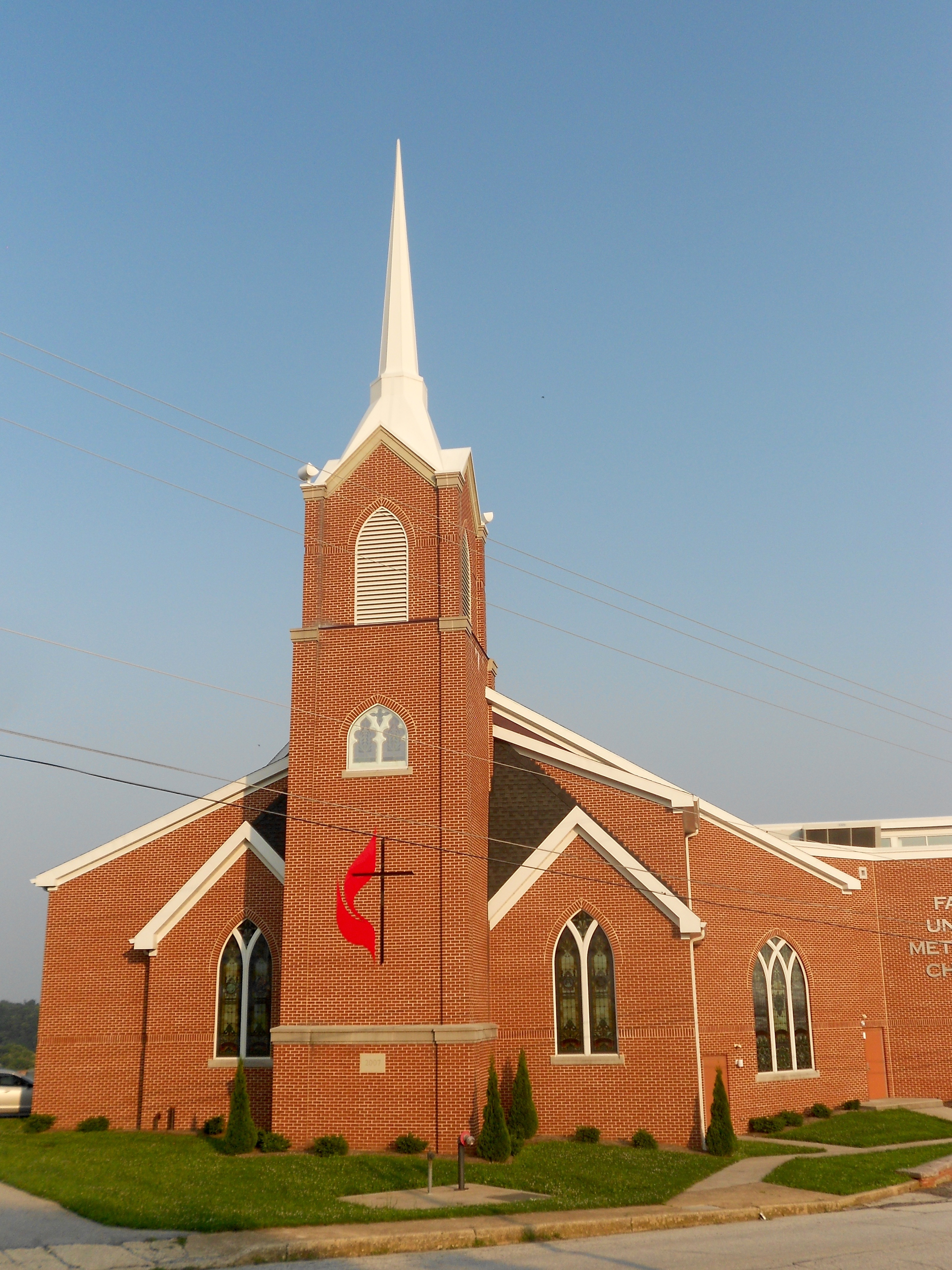
- United Methodist Church

- Location in York County and the U.S. state of Pennsylvania.

- Location of Fawn Grove in Pennsylvania Fawn Grove (the United States)
- Coordinates: 39°43′48″N 76°27′03″W
- Country: United States
- State: Pennsylvania
- County: York
- Settled: 1763
- Incorporated: 1881

Government
  - Type: Borough Council

Area
  - Total: 1.64 sq mi (4.26 km^{2})
  - Land: 1.64 sq mi (4.26 km^{2})
  - Water: 0 sq mi (0.00 km^{2})
- Elevation: 705 ft (215 m)

Population (2020)
  - Total: 475
  - Density: 289.3/sq mi (111.69/km^{2})
- Time zone: UTC-5 (Eastern (EST))
  - Summer (DST): UTC-4 (EDT)
- Zip code: 17321
- Area code: 717
- FIPS code: 42-25416
- Website: fawngroveborough.org

Fawn Grove is a borough in York County, Pennsylvania, United States. The population was 475 at the 2020 census. It is part of the York–Hanover metropolitan area. It is served by the South Eastern School District, which provides public education.

== Geography ==
Fawn Grove is located at 39°43′48″N 76°27′3″W (39.730004, -76.450761).

According to the United States Census Bureau, the borough has a total area of 1.6 square miles (4.1 km^{2}), all land.

== Demographics ==
Historical population
Census	Pop.	Note	%±
1890	199		—
1900	202		1.5%
1910	240		18.8%
1920	345		43.8%
1930	302		−12.5%
1940	320		6.0%
1950	397		24.1%
1960	409		3.0%
1970	485		18.6%
1980	516		6.4%
1990	489		−5.2%
2000	463		−5.3%
2010	452		−2.4%
2020	476		5.3%
2023 (est.)	474	▼	−0.4%

At the 2000 census there were 463 people, 182 households, and 139 families living in the borough. The population density was 289.2 inhabitants per square mile (111.7/km^{2}). There were 198 housing units at an average density of 123.7 units per square mile (47.8 units/km^{2}). The racial makeup of the borough was 99.35% White, 0.22% African American, 0.22% Asian, and 0.22% from two or more races. Hispanic or Latino of any race were 1.08%.

Of the 182 households 24.2% had children under the age of 18 living with them, 64.8% were married couples living together, 9.3% had a female householder with no husband present, and 23.1% were non-families. 17.6% of households were one person and 8.8% were one person aged 65 or older. The average household size was 2.54 and the average family size was 2.88.

The age distribution was 19.4% under the age of 18, 9.9% from 18 to 24, 27.2% from 25 to 44, 25.1% from 45 to 64, and 18.4% 65 or older. The median age was 41 years. For every 100 females there were 92.1 males. For every 100 females age 18 and over, there were 92.3 males.

The median household income was $48,750 and the median family income was $50,714. Males had a median income of $37,500 versus $25,000 for females. The per capita income for the borough was $20,105. About 2.2% of families and 1.1% of the population were below the poverty line, including none of those under age 18 and 5.3% of those age 65 or over.
