= Whiteford, Maryland =

Unincorporated community in Maryland, U.S.

Coordinates: 39°42′32″N 76°20′44″W

Whiteford is an unincorporated community in Harford County, Maryland, United States. The community has historically had a strong Welsh heritage, which is reflected in the local architecture.

The town, a part of the Whiteford-Cardiff Historic District, was added to the National Register of Historic Places in 2005. Until 1978, this community was served by the Maryland and Pennsylvania Railroad at milepost 42.4. Also on the National Register are the Broad Creek Soapstone Quarries and Slate Ridge School.

The populated place Cambria lies to the northwest of Whiteford.
