= Maryland Route 156 =

State highway in Harford County, Maryland, known as Aldino Rd

Maryland Route 156
- Aldino Road
- Maryland Route 156 highlighted in red

Route information
- Maintained by MDSHA
- Length: 3.92 mi (6.31 km)
- Existed: 1952–present

Major junctions
- West end: MD 22 near Churchville
- East end: MD 155 near Hopewell Village

Location
- Country: United States
- State: Maryland
- Counties: Harford

Highway system
- Maryland highway system; Interstate; US; State; Scenic Byways
← MD 155	→ MD 157

Maryland Route 156 (MD 156) is a state highway located in Harford County in the U.S. state of Maryland. Known as Aldino Road, the state highway runs 3.92 miles (6.31 km) from MD 22 near Churchville east to MD 155 near Hopewell Village. MD 156 provides access to the Harford County Airport in the unincorporated community of Aldino. The state highway, which was originally designated part of MD 155, was built as a modern highway by 1910 and rebuilt in the 1920s. MD 156 received its present designation in 1952 when MD 155 and MD 156 swapped paths.

== Route description ==
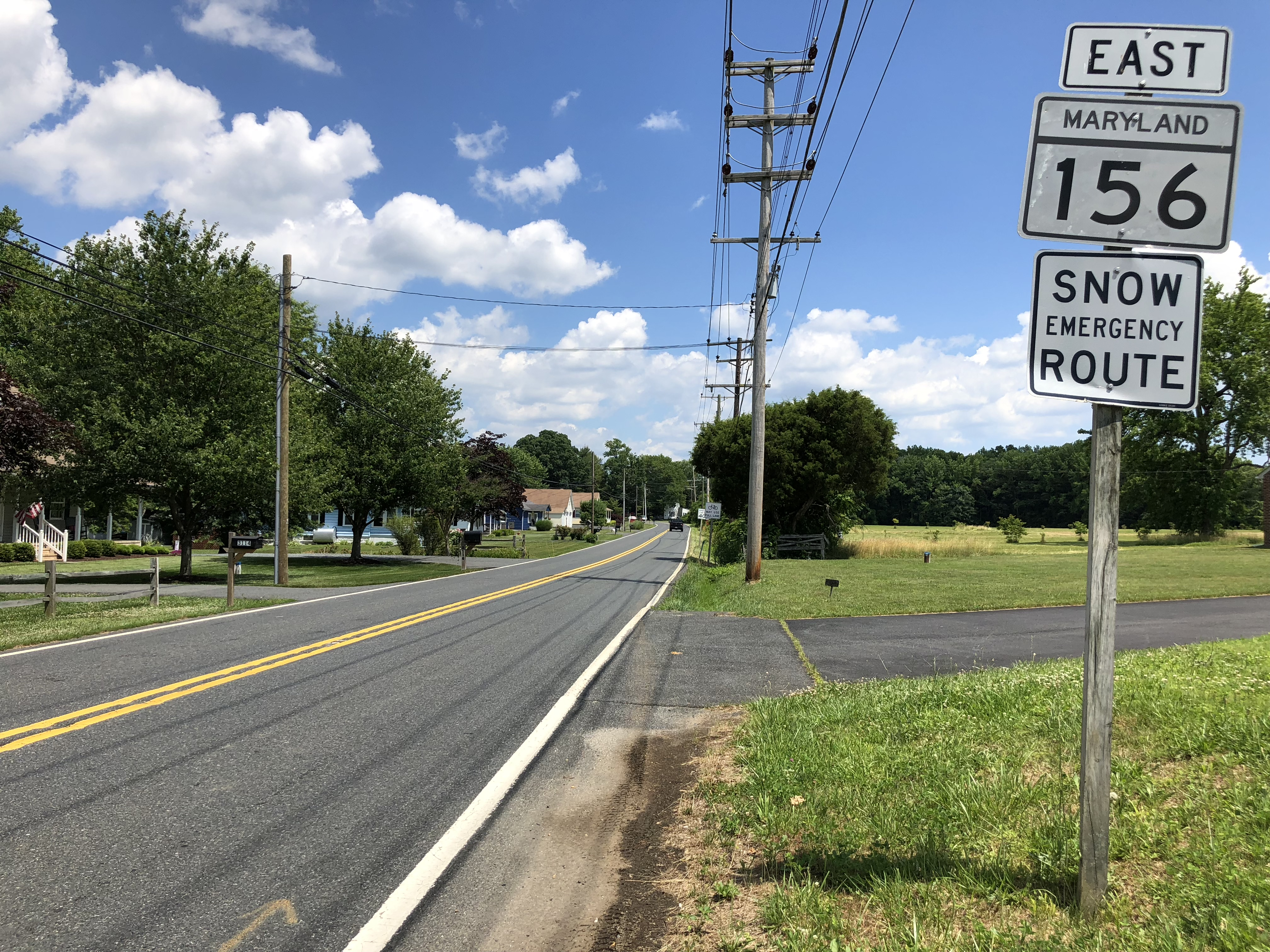
View east from the west end of MD 156 at MD 22 near Churchville

MD 156 begins at an oblique intersection with MD 22 (Churchville Road) in Churchville. Access is only permitted from westbound MD 156 to westbound MD 22 and from eastbound MD 22 to eastbound MD 156. The movements to connect with MD 22 in the direction of Aberdeen are made via the Aldino Road Spur, which is unsigned MD 156A. MD 156 heads east as a two-lane undivided road through farmland. The state highway provides access to the Harford County Airport in the hamlet of Aldino and intersects Chapel Road, which heads south toward Havre de Grace and passes the historic homes Chestnut Ridge and Winsted. MD 156 crosses Swan Creek before it reaches its eastern terminus at MD 155 (Level Road) near Hopewell Village.

== History ==
MD 156 follows the path of the old Bel Air Road from Havre de Grace. As a result, the highway was already paved by 1910. The state highway was repaved in macadam starting from the west end in 1921 and completed east to Webster in 1922. Aldino Road was originally marked as part of MD 155, which ran from the MD 22–MD 156 intersection in Churchville east to Havre de Grace; Level Road from Churchville to Hopewell Village was designated MD 156. MD 155 and MD 156 swapped routes in 1952.

== Junction list ==
The entire route is in Harford County.

Location	mi	km	Destinations	Notes
Churchville	0.00	0.00	MD 22 west (Churchville Road) – Bel Air	Western terminus; access to westbound MD 22 and access from eastbound MD 22
Churchville	0.07	0.11	To MD 22 east (Churchville Road) – Aberdeen	Unsigned MD 156A
Hopewell Village	3.92	6.31	MD 155 (Level Road) – Havre de Grace, Hopewell Village	Eastern terminus
1.000 mi = 1.609 km; 1.000 km = 0.621 mi: Incomplete access

== Auxiliary route ==
MD 156A is the designation for the Aldino Road Spur, a 0.04-mile (0.064 km) connector between MD 22 and MD 156 in Churchville. The spur completes the adjacent partial intersection of MD 22 and MD 156 by allowing access from westbound MD 22 to eastbound MD 156 and from westbound MD 156 to eastbound MD 156. MD 156A was designated in 2009. However, the Aldino Road Spur dates back to at least 1999.
