= Maryland Route 462 =

State highway in Maryland, United States

Maryland Route 462
- Paradise Road
- Maryland Route 462 highlighted in red

Route information
- Maintained by MDSHA
- Length: 4.15 mi (6.68 km)
- Existed: 1933–present

Major junctions
- South end: MD 132 in Aberdeen
- MD 22 in Aberdeen
- North end: MD 155 near Hopewell Village

Location
- Country: United States
- State: Maryland
- Counties: Harford

Highway system
- Maryland highway system; Interstate; US; State; Scenic Byways
| ← MD 460 | → MD 464 |

Maryland Route 462 (MD 462) is a state highway located in Harford County in the U.S. state of Maryland. Known as Paradise Road, the route runs 4.15 miles (6.68 km) from MD 132 in Aberdeen north to MD 155 near Hopewell Village. MD 462 was built in the early 1930s.

== Route description ==
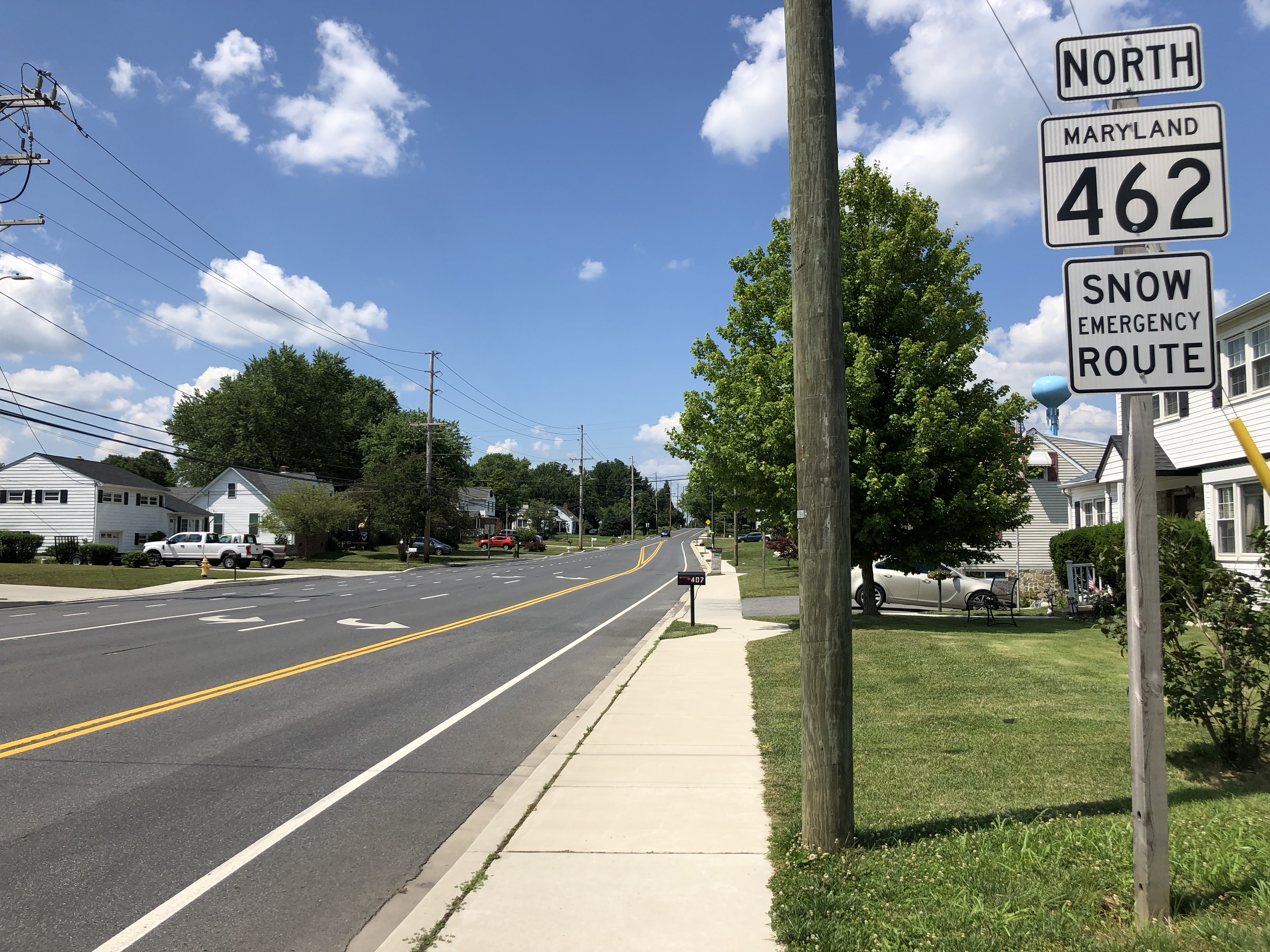
View north along MD 462 at MD 22 in Aberdeen

MD 462 begins at an intersection with MD 132 (Bel Air Avenue) in the city of Aberdeen. The state highway heads north as a two-lane undivided road through a residential neighborhood. Shortly after passing west of Aberdeen High School, MD 462 intersects MD 22 (Aberdeen Thruway), which connects Aberdeen Proving Ground with Interstate 95 (I-95) and the town of Bel Air. The state highway continues north through residential areas and leaves the city limits of Aberdeen between crossings of Carsins Run and Swan Creek. MD 462 passes through a mix of farmland and forest and passes under I-95 with no access. The state highway has staggered intersections with Chapel Road, which heads east toward the city of Havre de Grace and west toward Aldino. MD 462 intersects Webster Road, the old alignment of MD 155, before reaching its northern terminus at MD 155 (Level Road) in the hamlet of Webster east of Hopewell Village.

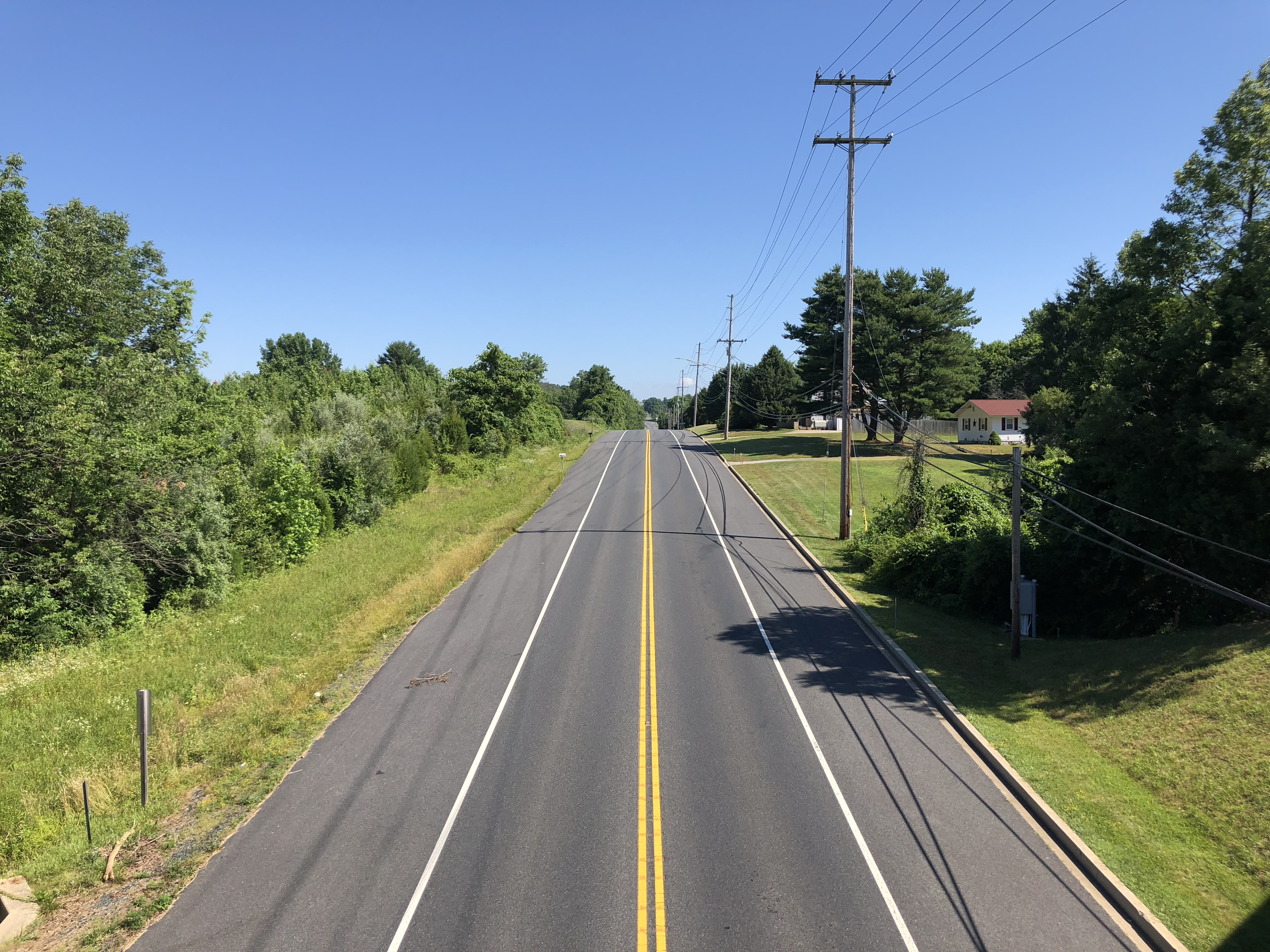
View north along MD 462 from I-95 in Chapel

== History ==
MD 462 was fully paved in macadam from Aberdeen to Webster by 1933. The state highway has not changed since except for minor improvements.

== Junction list ==
The entire route is in Harford County.

| Location | mi | km | Destinations | Notes |
|---|---|---|---|---|
| Aberdeen | 0.00 | 0.00 | MD 132 (Bel Air Avenue) | Southern terminus |
| Aberdeen | 0.65 | 1.05 | MD 22 (Aberdeen Thruway) – Bel Air, Aberdeen Proving Ground | |
| Hopewell Village | 4.15 | 6.68 | MD 155 (Level Road) – Churchville, Havre de Grace | Northern terminus |
1.000 mi = 1.609 km; 1.000 km = 0.621 mi
