= Bel Air South, Maryland =

- Census-designated place
- Location of Bel Air South, Maryland
- Coordinates: 39°30′31″N 76°19′44″W
- Country: United States
- State: Maryland
- County: Harford

Area
  - Total: 21.37 sq mi (55.34 km^{2})
  - Land: 21.27 sq mi (55.10 km^{2})
  - Water: 0.093 sq mi (0.24 km^{2})
- Elevation: 350 ft (110 m)

Population (2020)
  - Total: 57,648
  - Density: 2,709.7/sq mi (1,046.22/km^{2})
- Time zone: UTC−5 (Eastern (EST))
  - Summer (DST): UTC−4 (EDT)
- FIPS code: 24-05950

Bel Air South is a census-designated place (CDP) in Harford County, Maryland, United States. The population was 47,709 at the 2010 census, up from 39,711 in 2000.

== Geography ==
Bel Air South is located southwest of the center of Harford County at 39°30′10″N 76°19′8″W (39.502757, −76.318971). It is bordered to the north by the town of Bel Air (the Harford County seat) and the Bel Air North CDP. It is bordered to the south by Edgewood.

From the Bel Air town limits, the boundary of the Bel Air South CDP follows:

- Maryland Route 22 (Churchville Road) east to Schucks Road
- Schucks Road south to East Wheel Road
- East Wheel Road southwest to Laurel Bush Road
- Laurel Bush Road southeast to Abingdon Road
- Abingdon Road southeast to Interstate 95
- Interstate 95 southwest to Winters Run (I-95 forms the boundary with Edgewood)
- Winters Run northwest (upstream) to Baltimore Pike
- Baltimore Pike northeast to the Bel Air town limits.

Maryland Route 24 is the main road through the CDP, leading north into Bel Air and south across I-95 at Exit 77 to Edgewood. Via I-95, Baltimore is 22 miles (35 km) to the southwest.

According to the United States Census Bureau, the Bel Air South CDP has a total area of 15.8 square miles (40.8 km^{2}), of which 15.7 square miles (40.6 km^{2}) are land and 0.1 square miles (0.2 km^{2}), or 0.46%, are water.

The unincorporated community of Emmorton is near the geographic center of the CDP. Fountain Green is an unincorporated community in the northeast part of the CDP.

== Demographics ==
Historical population
Census	Pop.	Note	%±
1970	3,360		—
1980	8,461		151.8%
1990	26,421		212.3%
2000	39,711		50.3%
2010	47,709		20.1%
2020	57,648		20.8%

=== 2020 census ===
As of the 2020 census, Bel Air South had a population of 57,648. The median age was 39.5 years. 23.3% of residents were under the age of 18 and 15.8% of residents were 65 years of age or older. For every 100 females there were 93.0 males, and for every 100 females age 18 and over there were 89.4 males age 18 and over.

99.6% of residents lived in urban areas, while 0.4% lived in rural areas.

There were 21,873 households in Bel Air South, of which 34.5% had children under the age of 18 living in them. Of all households, 56.4% were married-couple households, 13.3% were households with a male householder and no spouse or partner present, and 24.6% were households with a female householder and no spouse or partner present. About 23.3% of all households were made up of individuals and 10.6% had someone living alone who was 65 years of age or older.

There were 22,565 housing units, of which 3.1% were vacant. The homeowner vacancy rate was 0.8% and the rental vacancy rate was 5.5%.

Racial composition as of the 2020 census
Race	Number	Percent
White	43,932	76.2%
Black or African American	5,205	9.0%
American Indian and Alaska Native	97	0.2%
Asian	3,418	5.9%
Native Hawaiian and Other Pacific Islander	28	0.0%
Some other race	933	1.6%
Two or more races	4,035	7.0%
Hispanic or Latino (of any race)	2,882	5.0%

=== 2000 census ===
As of the 2000 census, there were 39,711 people, 14,869 households, and 11,017 families residing in the CDP. The population density was 2,528.1 inhabitants per square mile (976.1/km^{2}). There were 15,267 housing units at an average density of 971.9 per square mile (375.3/km^{2}). The racial makeup of the CDP was 91.59% White, 4.11% African American, 0.16% Native American, 2.26% Asian, 0.04% Pacific Islander, 0.65% from other races, and 1.18% from two or more races. Hispanic or Latino of any race were 1.89% of the population.

There were 14,869 households, out of which 40.5% had children under the age of 18 living with them, 62.7% were married couples living together, 8.4% had a female householder with no husband present, and 25.9% were non-families. 21.2% of all households were made up of individuals, and 6.9% had someone living alone who was 65 years of age or older. The average household size was 2.67 and the average family size was 3.13.

In the CDP, the population was spread out, with 28.7% under the age of 18, 6.0% from 18 to 24, 34.8% from 25 to 44, 21.3% from 45 to 64, and 9.2% who were 65 years of age or older. The median age was 35 years. For every 100 females, there were 95.4 males. For every 100 females age 18 and over, there were 91.0 males.

=== 2007 American Community Survey ===
According to the 2007 American Community Survey three-year estimates, the median income for a household in the CDP was $79,623, and the median income for a family was $92,258. Males had a median income of $49,566 versus $34,263 for females. The per capita income for the CDP was $26,658. About 1.4% of families and 2.6% of the population were below the poverty line, including 1.8% of those under age 18 and 8.5% of those age 65 or over.

== Climate ==
Bel Air South has a humid continental climate (Köppen: Dfa).

Climate data for Bel Air South
Month	Jan	Feb	Mar	Apr	May	Jun	Jul	Aug	Sep	Oct	Nov	Dec	Year
Mean daily maximum °C (°F)	4.7 (40.5)	6.3 (43.3)	11.1 (52.0)	17.3 (63.1)	22.3 (72.1)	27.1 (80.8)	29.4 (84.9)	28.4 (83.1)	24.8 (76.6)	18.7 (65.7)	12.6 (54.7)	7.3 (45.1)	17.5 (63.5)
Daily mean °C (°F)	1.4 (34.5)	2.6 (36.7)	7.0 (44.6)	12.9 (55.2)	18.1 (64.6)	23.0 (73.4)	25.5 (77.9)	24.6 (76.3)	20.8 (69.4)	14.7 (58.5)	8.7 (47.7)	4.0 (39.2)	13.6 (56.5)
Mean daily minimum °C (°F)	−2.0 (28.4)	−1.2 (29.8)	2.9 (37.2)	8.6 (47.5)	14.0 (57.2)	19.2 (66.6)	21.9 (71.4)	21.2 (70.2)	17.2 (63.0)	10.9 (51.6)	4.8 (40.6)	0.8 (33.4)	9.9 (49.7)
Average precipitation mm (inches)	49.7 (1.96)	46.0 (1.81)	52.9 (2.08)	52.2 (2.06)	54.1 (2.13)	63.5 (2.50)	72.0 (2.83)	74.3 (2.93)	70.3 (2.77)	54.7 (2.15)	44.7 (1.76)	58.3 (2.30)	692.7 (27.28)
Source: Weather.Directory
