= W42 =

W42 may refer to:

- W42 (nuclear warhead)
- Fallston Airport, in Maryland
- Final stellation of the icosahedron
- Shibetsu Station, in Hokkaido, Japan
- W42, a Toyota W transmission
