= Maryland Route 155 =

State highway in Harford County, Maryland, known as Level Rd

Maryland Route 155
- Maryland Route 155 highlighted in red

Route information
- Maintained by MDSHA
- Length: 9.06 mi (14.58 km)
- Existed: 1927–present
- Tourist routes: Lower Susquehanna Scenic Byway

Major junctions
- West end: MD 22 in Churchville
- MD 161 in Hopewell Village; MD 156 near Hopewell Village; MD 462 near Hopewell Village; I-95 near Havre de Grace; MD 763 in Havre de Grace
- East end: US 40 / MD 7 in Havre de Grace

Location
- Country: United States
- State: Maryland
- Counties: Harford

Highway system
- Maryland highway system; Interstate; US; State; Scenic Byways
← MD 152	→ MD 156

Maryland Route 155 (MD 155) is a state highway in the U.S. state of Maryland. Known for most of its length as Level Road, the state highway runs 9.06 miles (14.58 km) from MD 22 in Churchville east to U.S. Route 40 (US 40) and MD 7 in Havre de Grace. In conjunction with MD 22, MD 155 serves as the main highway linking Bel Air and Havre de Grace in eastern Harford County. The state highway also connects Havre de Grace with Interstate 95 (I-95) and Susquehanna State Park. The first portion of MD 155 near Havre de Grace was built by 1910; the remainder of the highway east of Hopewell Village was completed in the mid-1920s. The Churchville–Hopewell Village portion of the state highway, originally designated MD 156, was built in the mid-1930s. MD 155 received its present designation over its western half in 1952 when MD 155 and MD 156 swapped paths.

== Route description ==
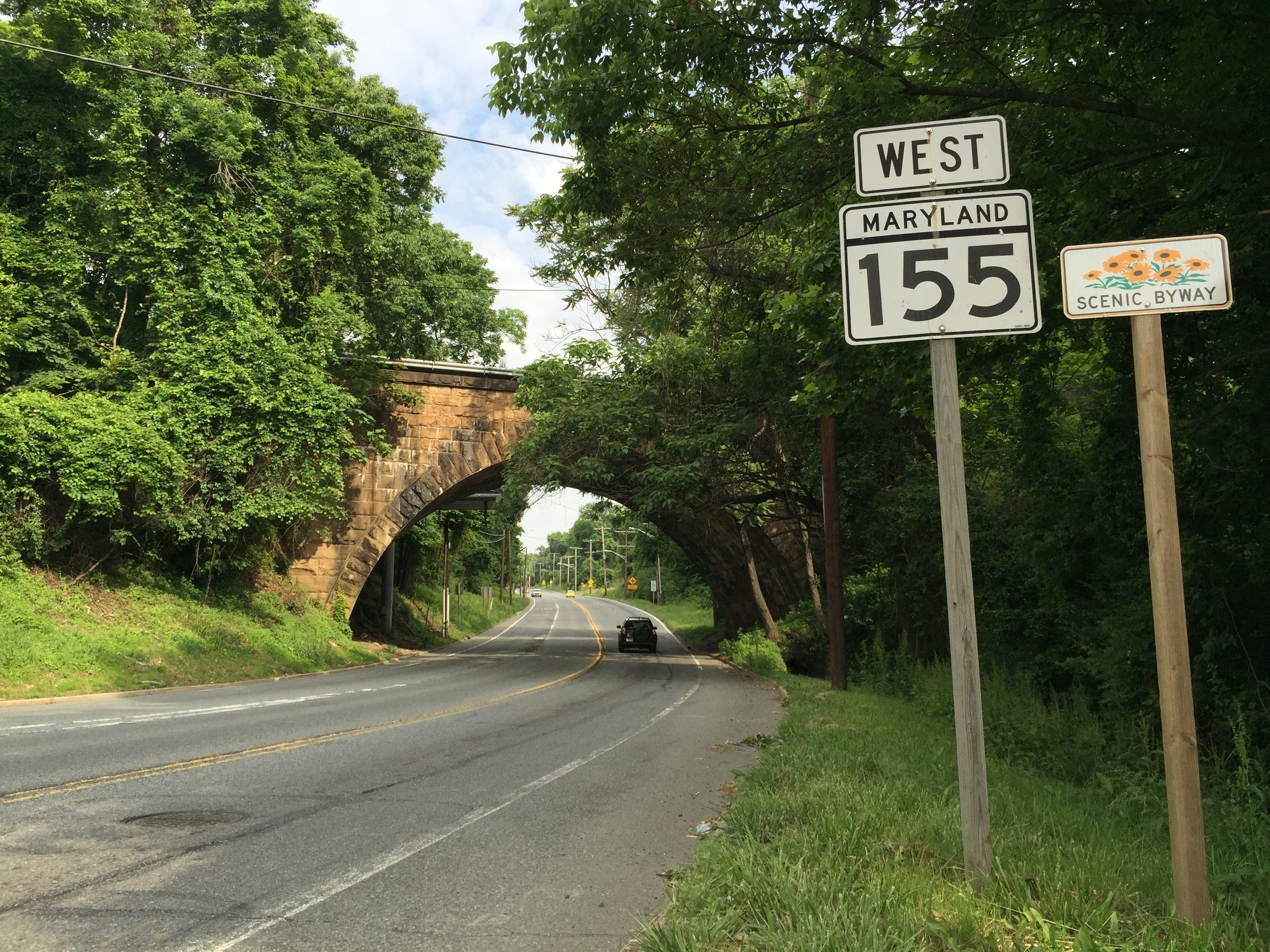
View west along MD 155 at MD 763 in Havre de Grace

MD 155 begins at an intersection with MD 22 (Churchville Road) in Churchville. The state highway heads east as Level Road, a two-lane undivided road that passes north of Church of the Holy Trinity and Churchville County Park and intersects Glenville Road, which heads northeast through the Finney Houses Historic District. In Hopewell Village (also known as Level), MD 155 becomes a partially controlled access highway east to I-95. The state highway parallels two sections of old alignment, McCommons Road to the south and Level Village Road to the north, and meets the southern end of MD 161 (Darlington Road) at a three-way stop. East of the village, MD 155 is paralleled by Rider Lane to the south and intersects the east end of MD 156 (Aldino Road). In the hamlet of Webster, the state highway meets the northern terminus of MD 462 (Paradise Road), Webster Road parallels the highway to the south, and the highway intersects Webster Lapidum Road, which heads northeast toward the Steppingstone Museum and the ruins of Lapidum, which are both contained within Susquehanna State Park.

The route meets I-95 (John F. Kennedy Memorial Highway) at a diamond interchange, with a park and ride lot located in the northeast quadrant of the interchange. After the I-95 interchange, MD 155 passes north of the historic home Sion Hill and comes to an eastbound truck check station that heralds the steep descent from the bluff above the Susquehanna River to the city of Havre de Grace. During the descent, the state highway has four lanes: one lane eastbound, a center left-turn lane, and two lanes westbound. The center turn lane disappears and a second lane appears eastbound as MD 155 enters the city limits, where its name changes to Superior Street. Close to the bottom of the hill, the state highway passes under CSX's Philadelphia Subdivision railroad line and turns south onto Ohio Street. Superior Street continues straight as MD 763 toward downtown Havre de Grace. MD 155 heads south as a two-lane street for a short distance before reaching its eastern terminus at an intersection with US 40 (Pulaski Highway) and MD 7 (Otsego Street). At this five-way intersection, MD 155 and MD 7 are perpendicular and US 40 cuts across from southwest to northeast, requiring a very sharp left turn to access eastbound US 40 to cross the Thomas J. Hatem Memorial Bridge over the Susquehanna River to Perryville.

MD 155 is a part of the National Highway System as a principal arterial from the city limit of Havre de Grace to the highway's eastern terminus at US 40.

== History ==
MD 155 from Webster east follows the path of the old Bel Air Road from Havre de Grace. As a result, the highway was paved from the city limits of Havre de Grace west to Lapidum Road by 1910. MD 155 was paved with macadam from Aldino Road to Earlton Road in 1923, which was an extension of construction along Aldino Road. The gap between Earlton Road and Lapidum Road was filled by 1927. MD 155 was originally assigned to Aldino Road east from Churchville, then its modern path to Havre de Grace. The next segment of MD 155's modern path to be constructed was from Aldino Road to Hopewell Village, which was paved in macadam in 1928 as part of MD 161. The original MD 156, Level Road from Churchville to Hopewell Village, was started east from Churchville around 1933. Construction on the state highway resumed by 1936 and was completed by 1938. MD 155 and MD 156 swapped routes in 1952. In 1954, the intersection of MD 22 and MD 155 was reconstructed. The MD 22–MD 155 intersection was relocated to the east to increase the distance from the intersection of MD 22 and MD 136 in 2003.

== Junction list ==
The entire route is in Harford County.

Location	mi	km	Destinations	Notes
Churchville	0.00	0.00	MD 22 (Churchville Road) – Aberdeen, Bel Air	Western terminus
Hopewell Village	3.72	5.99	MD 161 north (Darlington Road) – Darlington	Southern terminus of MD 161
Hopewell Village	4.42	7.11	MD 156 west (Aldino Road) – Churchville	Eastern terminus of MD 156
Hopewell Village	4.74	7.63	MD 462 south (Paradise Road) – Aberdeen	Northern terminus of MD 462
Havre de Grace	6.51	10.48	I-95 (John F. Kennedy Memorial Highway) – Baltimore, New York	I-95 Exit 89
Havre de Grace	8.71	14.02	MD 763 east (Superior Street) – Historic Havre de Grace	Western terminus of MD 763; MD 155 turns south onto Ohio Street
Havre de Grace	9.06	14.58	US 40 (Pulaski Highway) / MD 7 south (Otsego Street) / Otsego Street west – Aberdeen, Perryville	Eastern terminus
1.000 mi = 1.609 km; 1.000 km = 0.621 mi

== Auxiliary route ==
MD 155A is the designation for an unnamed 0.11-mile (0.18 km) section of old alignment of MD 155 at the MD 22–MD 155 intersection in Churchville. The state highway begins at a right-in/right-out intersection with westbound MD 22. The state highway heads east as a two-lane undivided road between businesses and drops to one lane eastbound before reaching its eastern terminus at MD 155. MD 155A was assigned to the old alignment of MD 155 when MD 155's intersection with MD 22 was moved east.
