= Bel Air North, Maryland =

- Census-designated place
- Location of Bel Air North, Maryland
- Coordinates: 39°33′27″N 76°23′54″W
- Country: United States
- State: Maryland
- County: Harford

Area
  - Total: 16.04 sq mi (41.55 km^{2})
  - Land: 15.97 sq mi (41.36 km^{2})
  - Water: 0.077 sq mi (0.20 km^{2})
- Elevation: 460 ft (140 m)

Population (2020)
  - Total: 31,841
  - Density: 1,994.1/sq mi (769.93/km^{2})
- Time zone: UTC−5 (Eastern (EST))
  - Summer (DST): UTC−4 (EDT)
- FIPS code: 24-05825

Bel Air North is a census-designated place (CDP) in Harford County, Maryland, United States. It is situated immediately north of (and excludes) the incorporated town of Bel Air. As of the 2010 census, the CDP population was 30,568, up from 25,798 in 2000.

== Geography ==
Bel Air North is located in west-central Harford County at 39°33′2″N 76°21′42″W (39.550439, −76.361781). It is bordered to the south by the town of Bel Air and the Bel Air South CDP. It is bordered to the southwest by Fallston. Maryland Route 23 and Prospect Mill Road form the northern border of Bel Air North. East of Bel Air, Maryland Route 22 (Churchville Road) separates Bel Air North from Bel Air South, while Baltimore Pike performs that function west of Bel Air. Winters Run forms the southwest border of the CDP, separating Bel Air North from Fallston.

U.S. Route 1 passes through the central part of the CDP as it bypasses Bel Air to the north. Route 1 leads northeast 13 miles (21 km) to the Conowingo Dam across the Susquehanna River and southwest 23 miles (37 km) to Baltimore.

According to the United States Census Bureau, the Bel Air North CDP has a total area of 16.1 square miles (41.8 km^{2}), of which 16.1 square miles (41.6 km^{2}) are land and 0.1 square miles (0.2 km^{2}), or 0.47%, are water.

== Demographics ==
Historical population
Census	Pop.	Note	%±
1970	2,771		—
1980	5,043		82.0%
1990	14,880		195.1%
2000	25,798		73.4%
2010	30,568		18.5%
2020	31,841		4.2%

=== 2020 census ===
As of the 2020 census, Bel Air North had a population of 31,841. The median age was 40.8 years. 23.8% of residents were under the age of 18 and 16.0% of residents were 65 years of age or older. For every 100 females there were 95.3 males, and for every 100 females age 18 and over there were 92.1 males age 18 and over.

94.8% of residents lived in urban areas, while 5.2% lived in rural areas.

There were 11,261 households in Bel Air North, of which 36.8% had children under the age of 18 living in them. Of all households, 64.0% were married-couple households, 10.2% were households with a male householder and no spouse or partner present, and 21.4% were households with a female householder and no spouse or partner present. About 18.9% of all households were made up of individuals and 9.7% had someone living alone who was 65 years of age or older.

There were 11,544 housing units, of which 2.5% were vacant. The homeowner vacancy rate was 0.8% and the rental vacancy rate was 3.7%.

Racial composition as of the 2020 census
Race	Number	Percent
White	27,343	85.9%
Black or African American	1,237	3.9%
American Indian and Alaska Native	34	0.1%
Asian	946	3.0%
Native Hawaiian and Other Pacific Islander	15	0.0%
Some other race	336	1.1%
Two or more races	1,930	6.1%
Hispanic or Latino (of any race)	1,136	3.6%

=== 2000 census ===
As of the 2000 census, there were 25,798 people, 8,716 households, and 7,190 families residing in the CDP. The population density was 1,577.0 inhabitants per square mile (608.9/km^{2}). There were 8,978 housing units at an average density of 548.8 per square mile (211.9/km^{2}). The racial makeup of the CDP was 94.96% White, 2.22% African American, 0.12% Native American, 1.61% Asian, 0.02% Pacific Islander, 0.27% from other races, and 0.79% from two or more races. Hispanic or Latino of any race were 1.10% of the population.

There were 8,716 households, out of which 48.3% had children under the age of 18 living with them, 72.0% were married couples living together, 8.2% had a female householder with no husband present, and 17.5% were non-families. 14.6% of all households were made up of individuals, and 5.3% had someone living alone who was 65 years of age or older. The average household size was 2.94 and the average family size was 3.28.

In the CDP, the population was spread out, with 31.4% under the age of 18, 5.9% from 18 to 24, 32.3% from 25 to 44, 22.3% from 45 to 64, and 8.1% who were 65 years of age or older. The median age was 35 years. For every 100 females, there were 94.4 males. For every 100 females age 18 and over, there were 90.5 males.

The median income for a household in the CDP was $86,881, and the median income for a family was $94,119. Males had a median income of $54,381 versus $32,521 for females. The per capita income for the CDP was $26,726. About 1.2% of families and 1.7% of the population were below the poverty line, including 1.6% of those under age 18 and 3.4% of those age 65 or over.
