= Harford County, Maryland =

County in Maryland, United States

- County
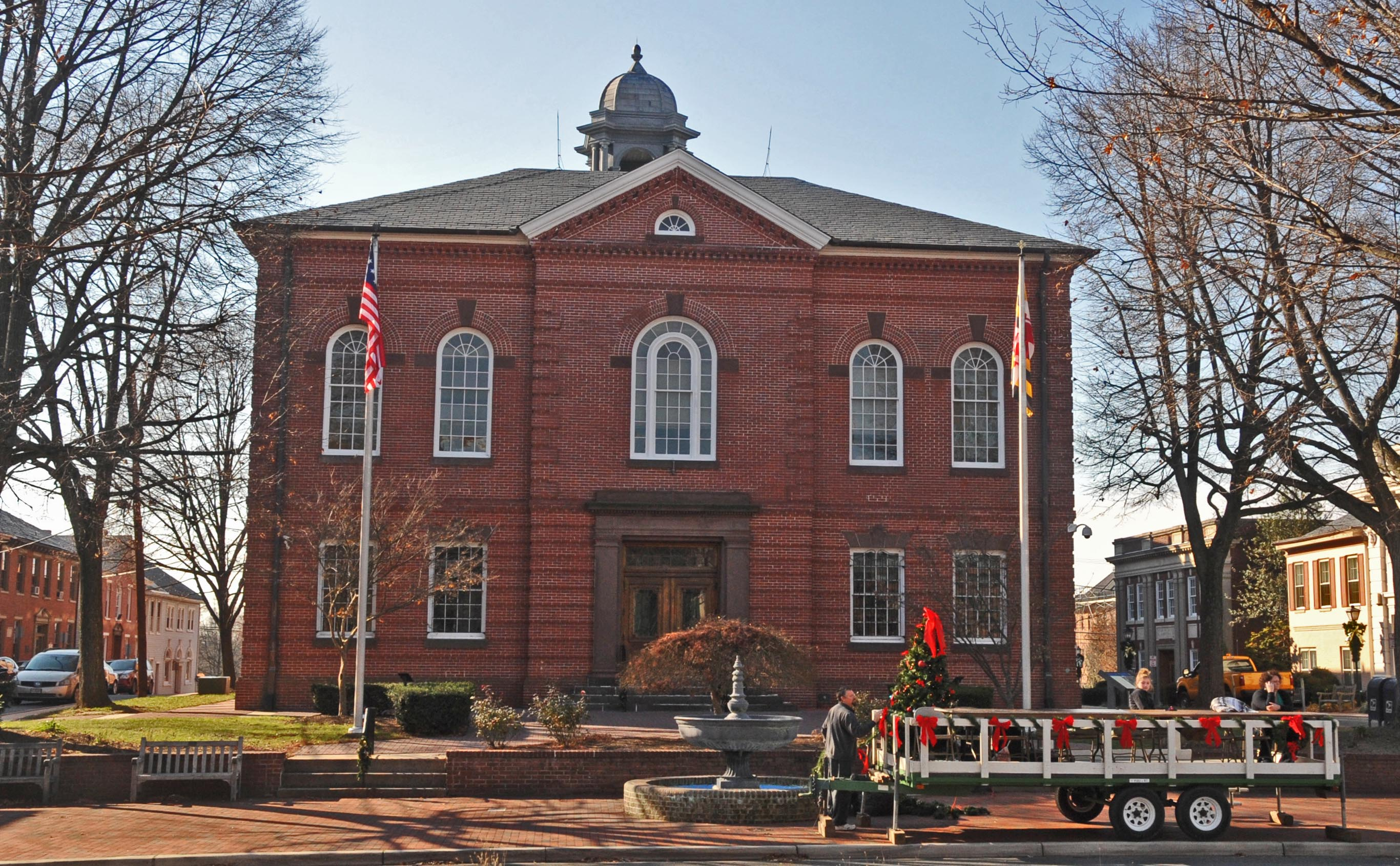
- Harford County Courthouse

- Flag Seal

- Location within the U.S. state of Maryland
- Coordinates: 39.54°N 76.30°W
- Country: United States
- State: Maryland
- Founded: December 17, 1773
- Named for: Henry Harford
- Seat: Bel Air
- Largest city: Aberdeen

Area
  - Total: 527 sq mi (1,360 km^{2})
  - Land: 437 sq mi (1,130 km^{2})
  - Water: 90 sq mi (230 km^{2}) 17%

Population (2020)
  - Total: 260,924
  - Estimate (2025): 266,446 ▲
  - Density: 597/sq mi (231/km^{2})
- Time zone: UTC−5 (Eastern)
  - Summer (DST): UTC−4 (EDT)
- Congressional district: 1st
- Website: www.harfordcountymd.gov

Harford County is located in the U.S. state of Maryland. As of the 2020 census, the population was 260,924. Its county seat is Bel Air. Harford County is part of the Baltimore metropolitan area and the Washington–Baltimore combined statistical area. The county is part of the Central Maryland region of the state.

== History ==
In 1608 the area was inhabited by Massawomecks and Susquehannocks. The first European to see the area was John Smith in 1608 when he traveled up the Chesapeake Bay from Jamestown. In 1652, the English and Susquehannocks signed a treaty at what is now Annapolis for the area now called Harford County.

Harford County was created from the eastern part of Baltimore County by an act of the Maryland General Assembly that was signed into law on December 17, 1773. The county government began operating on March 22, 1774, when the county court met for the first time at Bush Town. On March 22, 1775, Harford County hosted the signers of the Bush Declaration, a precursor document to the American Revolution. On January 22, 1782, Bel Air became the county seat.

Havre de Grace, a city incorporated in 1785 within Harford County, was once under consideration to be the capital of the United States rather than Washington, D.C. It was favored for its strategic location at the top of the Chesapeake Bay; this location would facilitate trade while being secure in time of war. Today, the waterways around Havre de Grace have become adversely affected by silt runoff, which is one of the primary environmental issues of Harford County. While today the site is a Maryland National Guard military reservation, the land was used as the Havre de Grace Racetrack where racehorse Man o' War ran in 1919 and 1920.

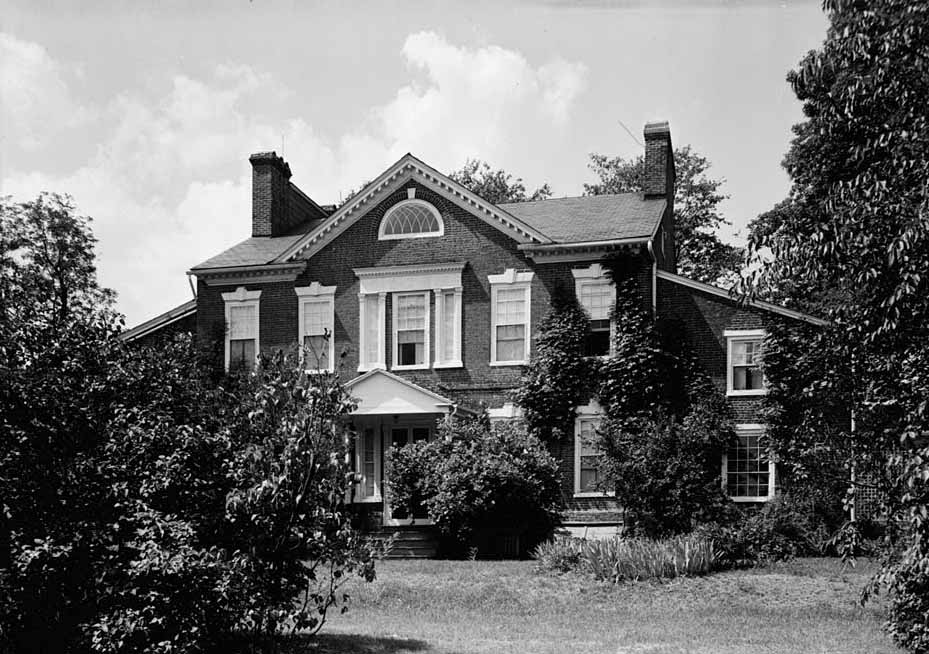
Sion Hill

During the 1900s the Bata Shoe Company employed numerous Eastern European refugees at the Belcamp factory. In the 1940s the Susquehanna River tributary Broad Creek was dammed to form the 55 acres (0.22 km^{2}) at what is now the Broad Creek Memorial Scout Reservation. In June 1972 Hurricane Agnes overflowed the dam and flooded areas in many states. On the County Health Rankings & Roadmaps by the Robert Wood Johnson Foundation with the University of Wisconsin Population Health Institute, "prior to the 2016 report ... Harford's yearly rankings (Note: "among Maryland's 23 counties and Baltimore City") typically fell between ninth and 10th place, primarily because of the percentage of county residents who were obese or who smoked." Scenes from Tuck Everlasting, From Within, and House of Cards were all filmed in Harford County.

In 2011 the Office of National Drug Control Policy deemed Harford County a designated High Intensity Drug Trafficking Area.

The county was named for Henry Harford (c. 1759–1834), the illegitimate son of Frederick Calvert, 6th Baron Baltimore. Henry Harford was born to Calvert's mistress, Hester Whelan, whose residence still stands as part of a private residence on Jarretsville Pike, in Phoenix, Maryland. Harford served as the last Proprietary Governor of Maryland but, because of his illegitimacy, did not inherit his father's title. There are 79 properties and districts listed on the National Register in the county, including one National Historic Landmark called Sion Hill.

=== Environmental history ===
Harford County has environmental issues in three major areas: land use, water pollution/urban runoff, and soil contamination/groundwater contamination.

As the county sits at the headwaters of the Chesapeake Bay along the Susquehanna River, it plays a key role in controlling sediment and fertilizer runoff into the bay as well as fostering submerged aquatic vegetation (SAV) regrowth. The county has had to balance the needs of land owners to practice agriculture and/or pave land (creating impervious surfaces) with effects of runoff into the bay.

Harford County has been burdened by soil contamination and groundwater contamination since the creation of the Aberdeen Proving Ground in 1917. The military installation performs research for the U.S. Army, including weapons testing, and has released various chemical agents into soil and groundwater, including mustard gas and perchlorate. The bordering towns of Aberdeen, Edgewood and Joppatowne have been affected by this contamination.

Aberdeen Proving Ground contains three Superfund priority sites as of 2006. Groundwater contamination by MTBE, a mandatory gasoline additive, has also affected Fallston.

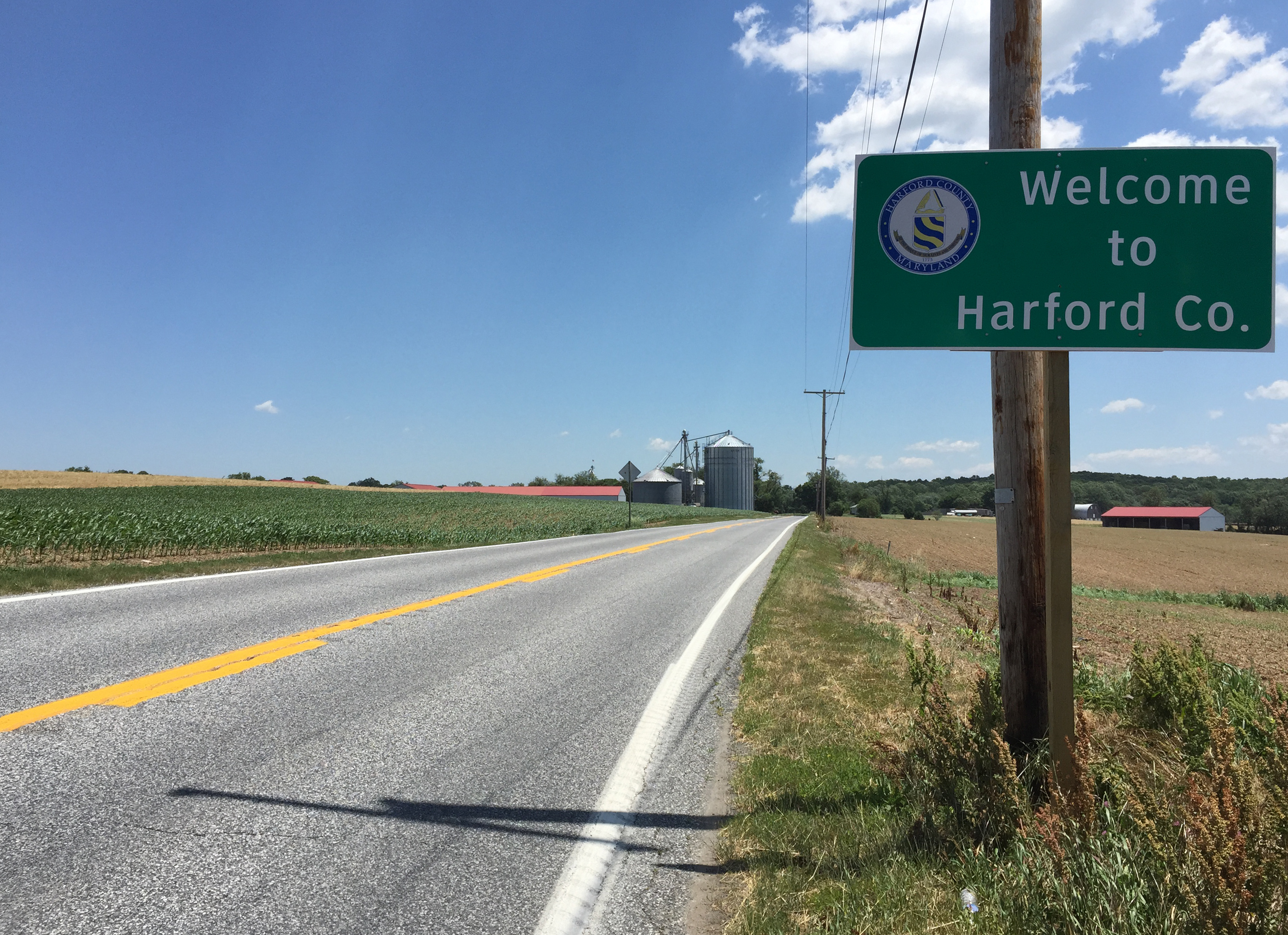
Entering Harford County, Maryland from Baltimore County, Maryland

The former Scarboro Landfill, near Street, was an unlined municipal landfill that received waste from approximately 1956 to 1986. It now occupies part of the Harford Waste Disposal Center, a lined sanitary landfill that opened in 1987. Groundwater contamination detected at the former landfill led to state investigations and a 1994 administrative consent order requiring groundwater remediation and long-term monitoring. Harford County continues to maintain the site's groundwater treatment system under requirements of the state consent order and permit conditions.

== Geography ==
Adjacent counties and national protected area

According to the U.S. Census Bureau, the county has a total area of 527 square miles (1,360 km^{2}), of which 437 square miles (1,130 km^{2}) is land and 90 square miles (230 km^{2}) (17%) is water.

Harford County straddles the border between the rolling hills of the Piedmont Plateau and the flatlands of the Atlantic Coastal Plain along the Chesapeake Bay and its tributaries. The county's development is a mix of rural and suburban, with denser development in the larger towns of Aberdeen and Bel Air and along Route 40 and other major arteries leading out of Baltimore. The highest elevations are in the north and northwest of the county, reaching 805 ft. near the Pennsylvania border in the county's northwestern corner. The lowest elevation is sea level along the Chesapeake Bay.

=== Adjacent counties ===
- York County, Pennsylvania (north)
- Lancaster County, Pennsylvania (northeast)
- Cecil County (east)
- Kent County (south)
- Baltimore County (west)

=== National protected area ===
- Susquehanna River National Wildlife Refuge

=== Communities ===
==== Cities ====
Cities and town
- Aberdeen
- Havre de Grace

==== Town ====
- Bel Air (county seat)

==== Unincorporated communities ====
- Aldino
- Benson
- Berkley
- Cardiff
- Castleton
- Churchville
- Clayton
- Constant Friendship
- Creswell
- Dublin
- Darlington
- Emmorton
- Fairview
- Forest Hill
- Fountain Green
- Glenwood
- Hess
- Hickory
- Hopewell Village
- Joppa
- Kalmia
- Level
- Madonna
- Norrisville
- Shawsville
- Street
- Taylor
- Whiteford

==== Census-designated places ====
Census-designated places
- Aberdeen Proving Ground
- Abingdon
- Bel Air North
- Bel Air South
- Darlington
- Edgewood
- Fallston
- Jarrettsville
- Joppatowne
- Perryman
- Pleasant Hills
- Pylesville
- Riverside (Belcamp)

==== Populated place ====
- Glenville

=== Climate ===
The January freezing isotherm runs across the northern part of the county and divides it into a humid subtropical climate (Cfa) and a hot-summer humid continental climate (Dfa.) Average monthly temperatures in Bel Air range from 32.6 °F in January to 76.6 °F in July, while in Aberdeen they range from 33.5 °F in January to 77.2 °F in July.

== Politics and government ==
Voter registration and party enrollment as of June 2026
Republican	83,255	41.69%
Democratic	64,467	32.28%
Unaffiliated	48,225	24.15%
Green	209	0.1%
Other parties	3,566	1.79%
Total	199,722	100%

United States presidential election results for Harford County, Maryland
Year	Republican		Democratic		Third party(ies)	
Year	No.	%	No.	%	No.	%
1892	2,449	40.67%	3,309	54.95%	264	4.38%
1896	3,374	47.49%	3,360	47.29%	371	5.22%
1900	3,145	45.42%	3,509	50.67%	271	3.91%
1904	2,561	43.91%	3,151	54.02%	121	2.07%
1908	2,742	45.91%	3,148	52.71%	82	1.37%
1912	1,737	30.40%	3,064	53.63%	912	15.96%
1916	2,302	40.16%	3,345	58.36%	85	1.48%
1920	4,175	49.86%	4,134	49.37%	65	0.78%
1924	3,545	45.69%	3,841	49.51%	372	4.80%
1928	6,479	64.53%	3,506	34.92%	55	0.55%
1932	3,954	39.02%	6,073	59.93%	107	1.06%
1936	5,327	46.20%	6,165	53.46%	39	0.34%
1940	6,501	53.91%	5,500	45.61%	59	0.49%
1944	6,751	58.25%	4,839	41.75%	0	0.00%
1948	6,168	52.49%	5,494	46.76%	88	0.75%
1952	10,770	60.99%	6,809	38.56%	80	0.45%
1956	12,657	65.77%	6,588	34.23%	0	0.00%
1960	12,090	56.54%	9,293	43.46%	0	0.00%
1964	9,968	42.38%	13,550	57.62%	0	0.00%
1968	15,799	51.48%	9,914	32.30%	4,978	16.22%
1972	25,141	73.16%	8,737	25.42%	488	1.42%
1976	24,309	55.00%	19,890	45.00%	0	0.00%
1980	26,713	52.44%	20,042	39.34%	4,186	8.22%
1984	37,382	68.41%	17,133	31.36%	127	0.23%
1988	38,493	65.73%	19,803	33.81%	270	0.46%
1992	36,350	45.05%	27,164	33.67%	17,173	21.28%
1996	39,686	50.76%	29,779	38.08%	8,726	11.16%
2000	52,862	57.82%	35,665	39.01%	2,897	3.17%
2004	71,565	63.48%	39,685	35.20%	1,478	1.31%
2008	71,751	58.19%	48,552	39.38%	2,992	2.43%
2012	72,911	57.89%	49,729	39.48%	3,314	2.63%
2016	77,860	58.25%	47,077	35.22%	8,735	6.53%
2020	80,930	54.61%	63,095	42.58%	4,161	2.81%
2024	83,050	55.33%	62,453	41.61%	4,587	3.06%

Harford County is, like the Pennsylvania Dutch Country to its north, a strongly Republican region. No Democratic presidential candidate has carried Harford County since Lyndon Johnson’s landslide of 1964, although recent trends have shown the county voting less Republican over the past few elections. In the period before World War II Harford leaned strongly Democratic as it had sizeable Confederate sympathies, but during and since World War II the county has turned away from its traditional allegiances.

Harford County was granted a charter form of government in 1972. This means that the county is run by a County Executive and Council President, both elected at large, as well as Council Members, elected from districts. Currently, there are six districts in Harford County. Also elected at large is the Sheriff, who runs the Harford County Sheriff's Office, the State's Attorney, who prosecutes all crimes in the county, the Register of Wills, and the Clerk of the Circuit Court.

=== Executive ===
The Harford County Executive is Bob Cassilly (Republican). Primary law enforcement in the county is handled by the Harford County Sheriff's Office, which has precincts in Jarrettsville, Edgewood and Bel Air. The current Sheriff is Jeffrey Gahler (R). The Maryland State Police also have a barrack located in Bel Air which serves the citizens of Harford County. Municipal police needs are provided by the Bel Air Police Department, the Aberdeen Police Department and the Havre De Grace Police Department. The current State's Attorney is Alison Healey, the first woman to hold the post. Directors are nominated by the Executive and approved by the council. The Volunteer Fire & EMS Association department (Note: 11 fire departments, one EMS department. All are volunteer companies.) is led by Russell Eyre.

2022-2026

== Harford County Council ==
District	Councilmember	Party
Council President	Patrick Vincenti	Republican
District A	Nolanda Robert	Democrat
District B	Aaron David Penman	Republican
District C	Tony "G" Giangiordano	Republican
District D	Jim Reilly	Republican
District E	Jessica Boyle-Tsottles	Republican
District F	Jacob D. Bennett	Democrat

== Demographics ==
Historical population
Census	Pop.	Note	%±
1790	14,976		—
1800	17,626		17.7%
1810	21,258		20.6%
1820	15,924		−25.1%
1830	16,319		2.5%
1840	17,120		4.9%
1850	19,356		13.1%
1860	23,415		21.0%
1870	22,605		−3.5%
1880	28,042		24.1%
1890	28,993		3.4%
1900	28,269		−2.5%
1910	27,965		−1.1%
1920	29,291		4.7%
1930	31,603		7.9%
1940	35,060		10.9%
1950	51,782		47.7%
1960	76,722		48.2%
1970	115,378		50.4%
1980	145,930		26.5%
1990	182,132		24.8%
2000	218,590		20.0%
2010	244,826		12.0%
2020	260,924		6.6%
2025 (est.)	266,446	▲	2.1%
U.S. Decennial Census; 1790–1960 1900–1990; 1990–2000 2010–2020

=== Racial and ethnic composition ===
Harford County, Maryland – Racial and ethnic composition Note: the US Census treats Hispanic/Latino as an ethnic category. This table excludes Latinos from the racial categories and assigns them to a separate category. Hispanics/Latinos may be of any race.
Race / Ethnicity (NH = Non-Hispanic)	Pop 1980	Pop 1990	Pop 2000	Pop 2010	Pop 2020	% 1980	% 1990	% 2000	% 2010	% 2020
White alone (NH)	130,347	160,988	187,548	194,004	186,984	89.32%	88.39%	85.80%	79.24%	71.66%
Black or African American alone (NH)	12,058	15,335	20,007	30,334	36,837	8.26%	8.42%	9.15%	12.39%	14.12%
Native American or Alaska Native alone (NH)	292	450	451	500	442	0.20%	0.25%	0.21%	0.20%	0.17%
Asian alone (NH)	1,307	2,446	3,294	5,774	8,094	0.90%	1.34%	1.51%	2.36%	3.10%
Native Hawaiian or Pacific Islander alone (NH)	x	x	115	171	178	x	x	0.05%	0.07%	0.07%
Other race alone (NH)	175	92	245	280	1,211	0.12%	0.05%	0.11%	0.11%	0.46%
Mixed race or Multiracial (NH)	x	x	2,761	5,150	13,171	x	x	1.26%	2.10%	5.05%
Hispanic or Latino (any race)	1,751	2,821	4,169	8,613	14,007	1.20%	1.55%	1.91%	3.52%	5.37%
Total	145,930	182,132	218,590	244,826	260,924	100.00%	100.00%	100.00%	100.00%	100.00%

=== 2020 census ===
As of the 2020 census, the county had a population of 260,924. The median age was 40.8 years, 22.5% of residents were under 18, and 16.9% were 65 years of age or older. For every 100 females there were 94.9 males, and for every 100 females age 18 and over there were 92.2 males. 79.1% of residents lived in urban areas, while 20.9% lived in rural areas.

The racial makeup of the county was 72.9% White, 14.5% Black or African American, 0.3% American Indian and Alaska Native, 3.1% Asian, 0.1% Native Hawaiian and Pacific Islander, 2.1% from some other race, and 7.1% from two or more races. Hispanic or Latino residents of any race comprised 5.4% of the population.

There were 98,282 households in the county, of which 32.7% had children under the age of 18 living with them and 24.5% had a female householder with no spouse or partner present. About 22.9% of all households were made up of individuals and 10.1% had someone living alone who was 65 years of age or older.

There were 103,284 housing units, of which 4.8% were vacant. Among occupied housing units, 76.7% were owner-occupied and 23.3% were renter-occupied. The homeowner vacancy rate was 1.3% and the rental vacancy rate was 6.2%.

=== 2010 census ===
As of the 2010 United States census, there were 244,826 people, 90,218 households, and 66,335 families residing in the county. The population density was 560.1 inhabitants per square mile (216.3/km^{2}). There were 95,554 housing units at an average density of 218.6 per square mile (84.4/km^{2}). The racial makeup of the county was 81.2% white, 12.7% black or African American, 2.4% Asian, 0.3% American Indian, 0.1% Pacific islander, 0.9% from other races, and 2.5% from two or more races. Those of Hispanic or Latino origin made up 3.5% of the population. In terms of ancestry, 28.1% were German, 19.8% were Irish, 12.2% were English, 9.9% were Italian, 6.8% were Polish, and 6.2% were American.

Of the 90,218 households, 36.6% had children under the age of 18 living with them, 57.9% were married couples living together, 11.3% had a female householder with no husband present, 26.5% were non-families, and 21.5% of all households were made up of individuals. The average household size was 2.68 and the average family size was 3.13. The median age was 39.4 years.

The median income for a household in the county was $77,010 and the median income for a family was $88,370. Males had a median income of $59,734 versus $44,706 for females. The per capita income for the county was $33,559. About 4.0% of families and 5.6% of the population were below the poverty line, including 7.3% of those under age 18 and 5.9% of those age 65 or over.

=== 2000 census ===
As of the census of 2000, there were 218,590 people, 79,667 households, and 60,387 families residing in the county. The population density was 496 people per square mile (192 people/km^{2}). There were 83,146 housing units at an average density of 189 per square mile (73/km^{2}). The racial makeup of the county was 86.77% White, 9.27% African-American, 0.23% Native American, 1.52% Asian, 0.06% Pacific Islander, 0.69% from other races, and 1.47% from two or more races. 1.91% of the population were Hispanic or Latino of any race. 22.5% were of German, 13.1% Irish, 9.8% Italian, 9.2% English, 8.1% "American" and 6.0% Polish ancestry.

In 2000 there were 79,667 households, out of which 38.70% had children under the age of 18 living with them, 61.90% were married couples living together, 10.20% had a female householder with no husband present, and 24.20% were non-families. 19.70% of all households were made up of individuals, and 6.80% had someone living alone who was 65 years of age or older. The average household size was 2.72 and the average family size was 3.14.

In the county, the age distribution of the population shows 27.90% under the age of 18, 6.80% from 18 to 24, 31.60% from 25 to 44, 23.70% from 45 to 64, and 10.10% who were 65 years of age or older. The median age was 36 years. For every 100 females there were 96.00 males. For every 100 females age 18 and over, there were 92.50 males.

The median income for a household in the county was $57,234, and the median income for a family was $63,868. Males had a median income of $43,612 versus $30,741 for females. The per capita income for the county was $24,232. About 3.60% of families and 4.90% of the population were below the poverty line, including 5.80% of those under age 18 and 6.70% of those age 65 or over.

== Economy ==
In 2024, Harford County had 95,188 people in civilian employment, with trade, transportation and utilities accounting for 22.2 percent of employment, followed by professional and business services at 13.7 percent and education and health services at 12.9 percent.

According to the Maryland Department of Commerce, major employers in Harford County in 2024–2025 included:

Employer	Product or service	Employees
Aberdeen Proving Ground	Military installation and research and development	21,000
University of Maryland Upper Chesapeake Health	Medical services	3,350
Smiths Detection	Research and development and technology	1,000
Amazon	Logistics	1,000
Harford Community College	Higher education	1,000
Kohl's	Logistics	950
Klein's ShopRite of Maryland	Supermarkets	900
Walmart	Retail	810
Frito-Lay	Snack products	810
CACI	Engineering and cybersecurity	700
Jones Junction Auto Group	Automobile dealership	670
Target	Department stores	500
Booz Allen Hamilton	Government support	485
BSC America	Automobile services	460
Blue Dot of Maryland	Plumbing services	402
Wegmans	Supermarkets	385
Independent Can Company	Manufacturing	332
Chesapeake Spice Company	Manufacturing	328

== Culture ==
The Susquehanna Symphony Orchestra, formerly the Harford Community Orchestra, is an orchestra that is based in Harford County. The group is made up of 70 musicians from many professions.

The Havre De Grace Decoy Museum is a museum dedicated to working and decorative decoys used on the Chesapeake Bay.

Harford Community College hosts many cultural spots. The Student Center hosts the Chesapeake Gallery, a collection of artwork from established artists, as well as students and faculty, and the Chesapeake Theater, a theater venue used by the Phoenix Festival Theater Company, a student run theater group.

Harford Community College also has the Joppa Hall, which houses the Blackbox Theatre, an additional theater venue used by the Harford Dance Theater Company and the HCC Actors Guild. The Joppa Hall also houses the Joppa Recital Halls, a venue for musical performances.

Also at HCC is the Hays-Heighe House, a museum dedicated to the history of Harford County.

The Historical Society of Harford County, one of the oldest county historical societies in Maryland, was established in 1885 to preserve, promote, and interpret the history of the county and its people. Today, it is headquartered on Main Street in downtown Bel Air in the historic 1936 Old Bel Air Post Office Building, where it maintains an archive, exhibit space, and research library.

== Sports ==
No major league sports teams are based in Harford County. The list of sports teams and organizations are shown below:

Program	Colors	Conference	League	Facilities	Level
Aberdeen IronBirds		N/A	N/A	Ripken Stadium	MLB Draft League
Harford Community; College Fighting Owls		MD JUCO	NJCAA	Harford Sports Complex	College
Aberdeen Eagles		Upper Chesapeake Bay; Athletic Conference	MPSSAA	Various	High School
Bel Air Bobcats		Upper Chesapeake Bay; Athletic Conference	MPSSAA	Various	High School
C. Milton Wright Mustangs		Upper Chesapeake Bay; Athletic Conference	MPSSAA	Various	High School
Edgewood Rams		Upper Chesapeake Bay; Athletic Conference	MPSSAA	Various	High School
Fallston Cougars		Upper Chesapeake Bay; Athletic Conference	MPSSAA	Various	High School
Harford Technical Cobras		Upper Chesapeake Bay; Athletic Conference	MPSSAA	Various	High School
Havre De Grace Warriors		Upper Chesapeake Bay; Athletic Conference	MPSSAA	Various	High School
Joppatowne Mariners		Upper Chesapeake Bay; Athletic Conference	MPSSAA	Various	High School
North Harford Hawks		Upper Chesapeake Bay; Athletic Conference	MPSSAA	Various	High School
Patterson Mill Huskies		Upper Chesapeake Bay; Athletic Conference	MPSSAA	Various	High School
Harford Christian Eagles		N/A	MACSAC	Various	High School
John Carroll Patriots		N/A	MIAA -B (Boys); IAAM (Girls); Baltimore Catholic League (Basketball)	Various	High School

Harford County is the home of several sports icons, including 2006 Winter Olympics figure skating competitor Kimmie Meissner, Baseball Hall of Famer and former Baltimore Oriole Cal Ripken, and former Minnesota Vikings linebacker EJ Henderson.

== Infrastructure ==
The Conowingo Dam is on the eastern border of Harford County.

=== Transportation ===
==== Major highways ====
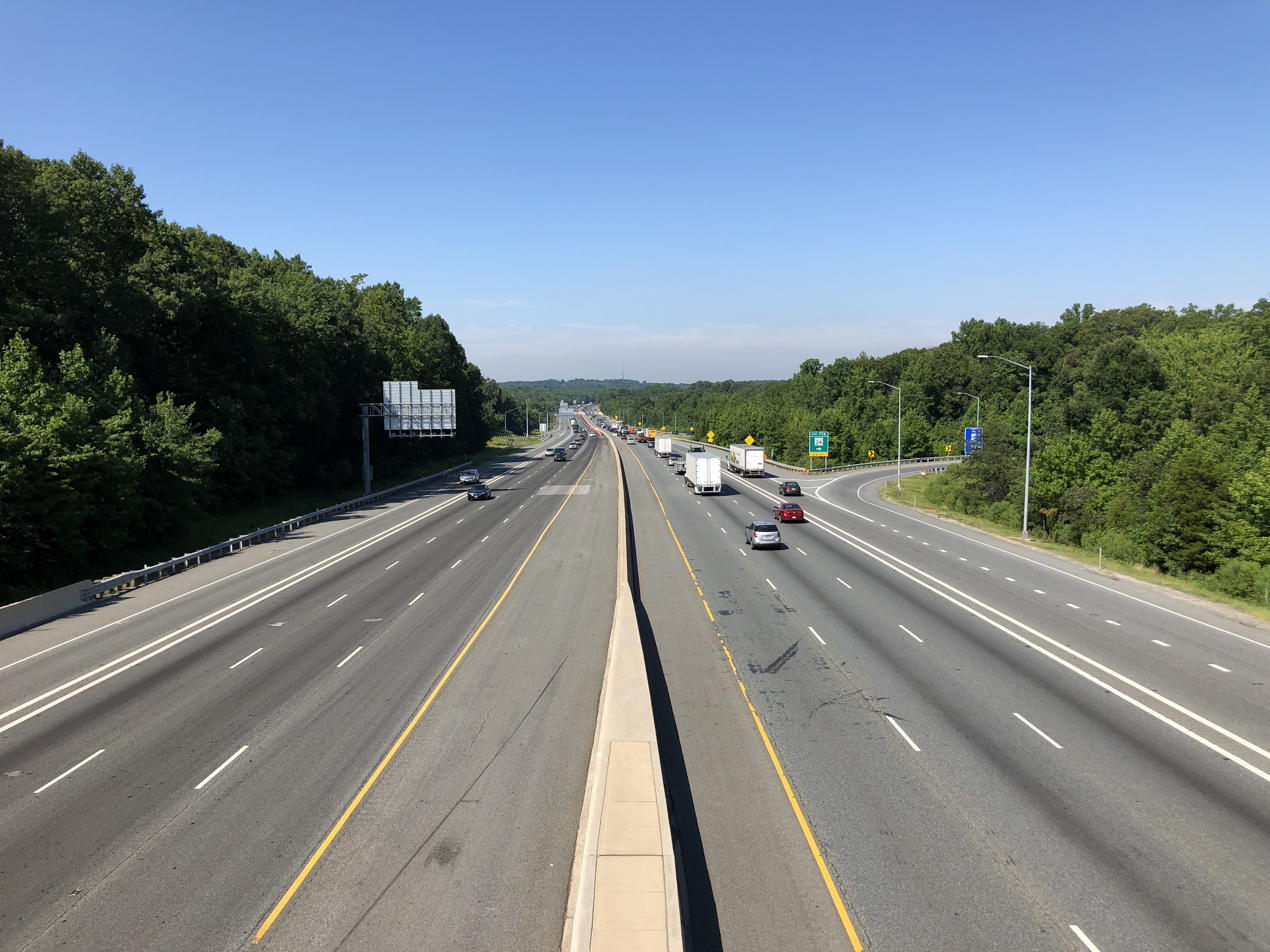
I-95 at MD 24 in Harford County

- I-95
- US 1
- US 1 Bus.
- US 40
- MD 7
- MD 22
- MD 23
- MD 24
- MD 132
- MD 136
- MD 138
- MD 146
- MD 147
- MD 152
- MD 155
- MD 156
- MD 159
- MD 161
- MD 165
- MD 439
- MD 440
- MD 462
- MD 490
- MD 543
- MD 623
- MD 624
- MD 646
- MD 715
- MD 755
- MD 763
- MD 924

==== Mass transportation ====
Buses are run by the county-owned Harford Transit. The state-operated MARC Penn Line serves Edgewood and Aberdeen.

==== Airports ====
The Harford County Airport is a public airport in Churchville that supports general aviation, flight training, sightseeing flights, and skydiving.

Other public-use aviation facilities in Harford County include Fallston Airport, a general aviation airport in Fallston, and the Havre de Grace Seaplane Base, a seaplane facility near Havre de Grace.

Aberdeen Proving Ground also operates Phillips Army Airfield and Weide Army Heliport, neither of which is available for commercial or civilian access.

=== Health ===
Health services are provided by Upper Chesapeake Health System. Harford Memorial Hospital located in Havre De Grace and Upper Chesapeake Medical Center located in Bel Air form the two hospital system. UCHS is a member of the University of Maryland Medical System.

== Education ==
=== Primary and secondary education ===
==== Harford County Public Schools ====
The Harford County Public Schools system is the public school system serving the residents of Harford County. It includes thirty-two elementary schools, nine middle schools, ten high schools and one charter school.

==== Private schools ====
- Harford Christian School, a Christian school for pre-kindergarten through 12th grade.
- The John Carroll School, a Catholic school for 9th through 12th grade.
- Trinity Lutheran School, was a Lutheran school for pre-kindergarten through 8th grade.
- Harford Day School, a private school for Kindergarten through 8th grades.
- Harford Friends School, a Quaker school for Kindergarten through 8th grades.
- Saint Margaret School, a Catholic school for pre-kindergarten through 8th grade.
- Grace Classical Academy, formerly Oak Grove Classical Christian School, is a Classical Christian school for kindergarten through 12th grade.
- The Highlands School is a private, independent, AIMS accredited, K-12 program designed for students with dyslexia, ADHD, and language-based learning differences.

=== Colleges ===
Harford Community College, located in Churchville, offers 2-year associate degrees and vocational programs. Recently, Harford Community College has entered into several partnerships with local four-year colleges for enhanced offerings, for credit at those institutions, to be taught on campus and at the surrounding buildings. Towson University in Northeastern Maryland, located on the grounds of Harford Community College, offers a select amount of four-year degrees that students can obtain after completing the required credits at Harford Community College.

== Media ==
The newspaper of record is The Aegis. Several radio stations are located in Harford County. WAMD at 970 AM licensed to Aberdeen follows the format of Top 40. WHFC at 91.1 FM licensed to Bel Air follows the format of Variety. WHGM at 1330 AM/104.7 FM licensed to Havre de Grace follows the format of Adult hits. WXCY-FM at 103.7 FM licensed to Havre de Grace follows the format of Country. The Harford Cable Network, or HCN, provides local TV. It shows local government events, high school and Fighting Owl sporting events and religious programming, among others.
