= Winsted (Aberdeen, Maryland) =

Historic house in Maryland, United States

- U.S. National Register of Historic Places
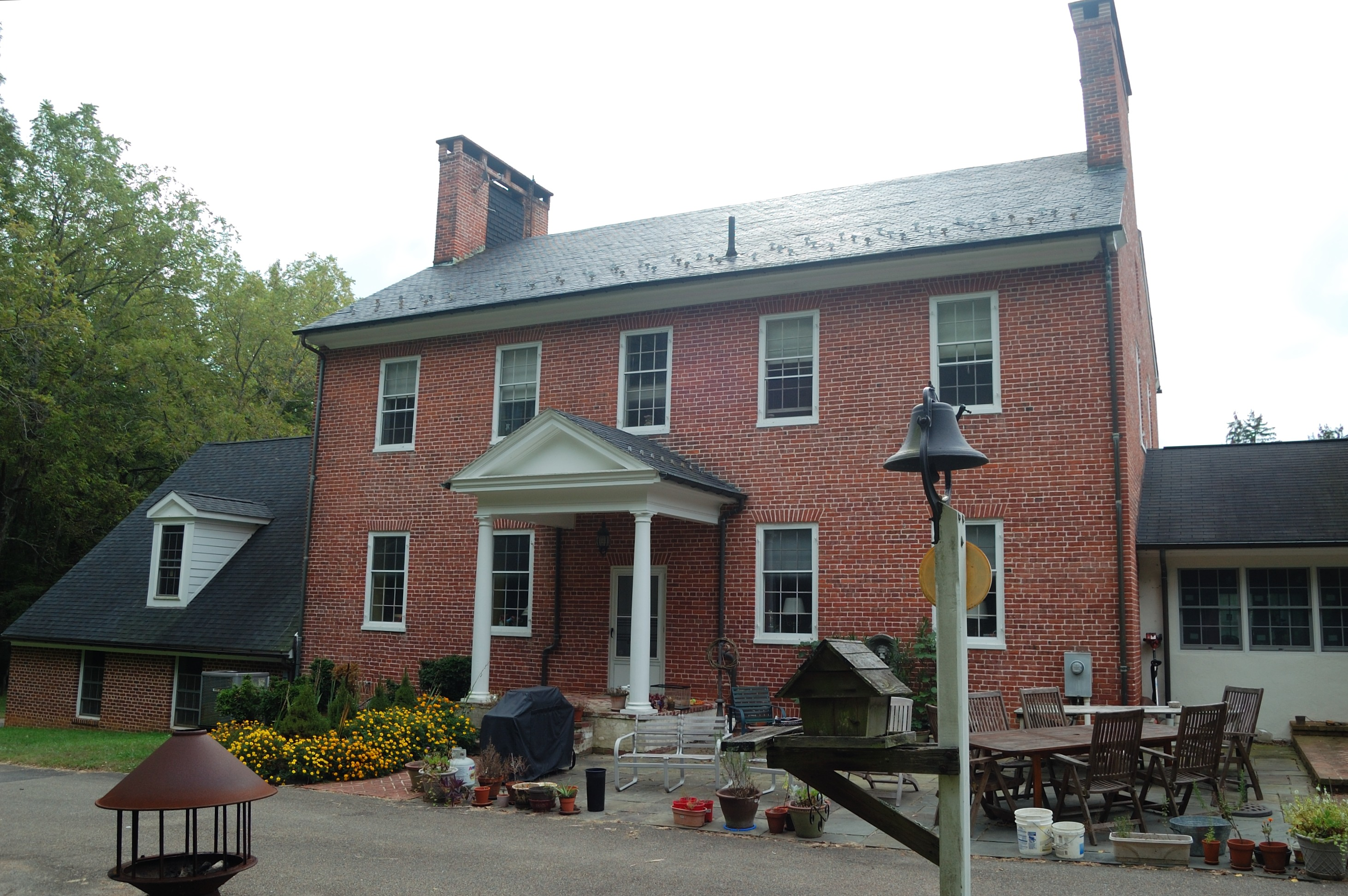
- Winsted in 2013

- Location within Maryland Location within the United States
- Location: 3844 Chapel Road, Aberdeen, Maryland
- Coordinates: 39°33′36″N 76°10′54″W
- Area: 5 acres (2.0 ha)
- Built: 1805
- Built by: Hoopman, Christian
- Architectural style: Federal
- NRHP reference No.: 79003266
- Added to NRHP: September 19, 1979

Winsted, also known as the Todd House and the Old Brick House, is a historic home located at Aberdeen, Harford County, Maryland, United States. It is a two-story, five-bay brick federal style dwelling on a low stone foundation. Also on the property is a small one-story rubble stone smokehouse.

Winsted was listed on the National Register of Historic Places in 1979.
