= Trinity Lutheran Christian School (Harford County, Maryland) =

Coordinates: 39.44022°N 76.33982°W

Trinity Lutheran Christian School & Early Learning Center (TLCS) was a private K-8 Christian school in the Joppa community and in the Edgewood census-designated place in Harford County, Maryland.

Trinity Lutheran K-8 school closed permanently on May 30, 2025.
