= Bush Declaration =

Expressed support for the Patriot cause in the emerging American Revolution

The Bush Declaration, also known as the Bush River Declaration, the Bush River Resolution, and the Harford Declaration, was a resolution adopted on March 22, 1775, in Harford County, Maryland. Like other similar resolutions in the Thirteen Colonies around this time, the Bush Declaration expressed support for the Patriot cause in the emerging American Revolution.

== The Declaration ==
The declaration read:

We, the Committee of Harford County, having most Seriously and maturely Considered the Resolves and Association of the Continental Congress, and the Resolves of the Provincial Convention, do most heartily approve of the same, and as we Esteem ourselves in a more particular manner intrusted by our Constituents to see them carried into Execution, we do most solemnly pledge ourselves to each other, and to our country, and engage ourselves by every tie held sacred among mankind, to perform the same at the risque of our lives and fortunes.

The declaration was signed by thirty-four committee members. Although the Bush Declaration was not a call for separation from the British Empire, local histories have, with perhaps more pride than historical accuracy, described the Bush Declaration as the first declaration of independence made by any representative body in America. Reasons for imagining this declaration as one of independence stem from two positions; the first being, that the signers understood adoption of such a declaration was akin to treason, and so record the risk to their lives in doing so. The second position is an argument from inference since Thomas Jefferson appears to have been familiar with the document. The last line of the Bush Declaration is surprisingly similar to the last line found in the Declaration of Independence, as it states, "We mutually pledge to each other our Lives, our Fortunes, and our sacred Honor." Jefferson may have reasoned such language was suited towards the pursuit of independence, and in understanding the stakes implied in the Bush Declaration, looked to the document to make a fitting statement on behalf of the country.

== Signers ==
The signers were as follows:

- Charles Anderson (b.1734 – d.1824, Green co., PA)
- John Archer (b.5 May 1741 – d. 28 Sep 1810, "Medical Hall", nr. Churchville, Harford co., MD. Buried at Churchville Presbyterian Church Cem., Churchville, Harford co., MD)
- William Bradford, Sr. (b.1739 – d.1794)
- Thomas Brice (b.1746)
- Samuel Calwell (b. c1741 – d. 1799, Harford co., MD)
- Richard Dallam (b.1743 – d. 1805, Harford co., MD)
- John Donahuy (or Donahey)
- Greenberry Dorsey (b. 10 Mar 1728/29 – d. by 9 April 1798 Harford co., MD)
- John Durham (b. 22 Feb 1737/8, Baltimore co., MD – d. 1801, Harford co., MD)
- William Fisher, Jr. (b.1740 – d.1835, Harford co., MD)
- Aquila Hall (b. 1727, Baltimore co., MD – d.1779, Harford co., MD)
- Aquila Hall, Jr. (b. c.1750, Baltimore co., MD – d.1815, Baltimore co., MD)
- Josias Carvil Hall (b. 7 Jul 1746, Baltimore co., MD – d. 1814, Harford co., MD)
- James Harris (d. 1777, Harford co., MD) (unmarried)
- Francis Holland (b. 1 Aug 1745, Baltimore co., MD – d. by 30 Jul 1795, Harford co., MD)
- Thomas Johnson (b.1726)
- Robert Lemmon (b. c.1740, Ireland – d. 1817, Somerset co., MD)
- James Lytle (b. 1752 – d. 1809, Harford co., MD)
- James McComas (b.1735 – d. 1791, Harford co., MD)
- Robert Morgan (b. 24 May 1755)
- William Morgan (b. 14 Mar 1743/44, Baltimore co., MD – d. Nov 1795, Deer Creek, Harford co., MD)
- Benjamin Bradford Norris (b.1745 – d. 1790)
- Aquila Paca (b. 21 Jun 1738, Baltimore co., MD – d. 26 Feb 1788 in Harford co., MD)
- John Patrick (b. 1742, Lancaster co., PA – d. bef. 10 Oct 1805, Baltimore co. MD)
- George Patterson (b.1748 – d. 1808, Harford co., MD. Buried at St. George's Parish Cem., Perryman, Harford co., MD)
- Edward Prall (b.1734, NJ – d.1803, Harford co., MD. unmarried)
- Alexander Rigdon (b.1743 – d. 1820, Harford Co, MD)
- Daniel Scott (b.1747 – d. 1828, Harford co., MD)
- William Smith (b. c.1720, Baltimore Co, MD – d. 1777, Harford co., MD)
- William Smithson (b.1745 – d. 17 Jan 1809, "The Homestead", Bel Air, Harford co., MD)
- John Taylor (b. 24 Sept 1736, Baltimore Co, MD – d. after 1775)
- Edward Ward (b. 1709 – d. 1791, Harford Co, MD)
- William Webb (b.1732 – d. 1778, Harford co., MD)
- Abraham Whitaker (b.1737 – d. 1784, Harford co., MD)

== See also ==
- Halifax Resolves
