= Maryland Route 132 =

State highway in Harford County, Maryland, US

Maryland Route 132
- Maryland Route 132 highlighted in red

Route information
- Maintained by MDSHA
- Existed: 1969–present

MD 132
- Length: 2.15 mi (3.46 km)
- West end: Cul-de-sac in Aberdeen
- Major intersections: MD 462 in Aberdeen; US 40 in Aberdeen
- East end: Norman Avenue in Aberdeen

MD 132B
- Length: 1.43 mi (2.30 km)
- West end: MD 22 in Aberdeen
- East end: US 40 near Havre de Grace

Location
- Country: United States
- State: Maryland
- Counties: Harford

Highway system
- Maryland highway system; Interstate; US; State; Scenic Byways
← MD 131	→ MD 133

Maryland Route 132 (MD 132) is a collection of state highways in the U.S. state of Maryland. These four highways are sections of old alignment of and connecting roads with MD 22 in Aberdeen, Harford County. MD 132 connects Aberdeen neighborhoods east and west of U.S. Route 40 (US 40) with MD 22 and Interstate 95 (I-95). MD 132B serves the area east of US 40 and north of MD 22 between Aberdeen and Havre de Grace. MD 132A and MD 132C are connectors between MD 132 and MD 22. The highways that are now part of MD 132 were originally built in the early 1910s and marked as part of MD 22 and US 40 in 1927. MD 22 was extended east and north along the US 40 portion when the U.S. highway was relocated in the 1930s. MD 132 was assigned to the highway when MD 22 was relocated in the late 1960s. MD 132 became a split route following the construction of a railroad grade separation in the 1980s.

== Route description ==
MD 132 runs 2.15 miles (3.46 km) between the west and east sides of Aberdeen. MD 132B runs 1.43 miles (2.30 km) from MD 22 in Aberdeen east to US 40 near Havre de Grace.

=== Aberdeen ===
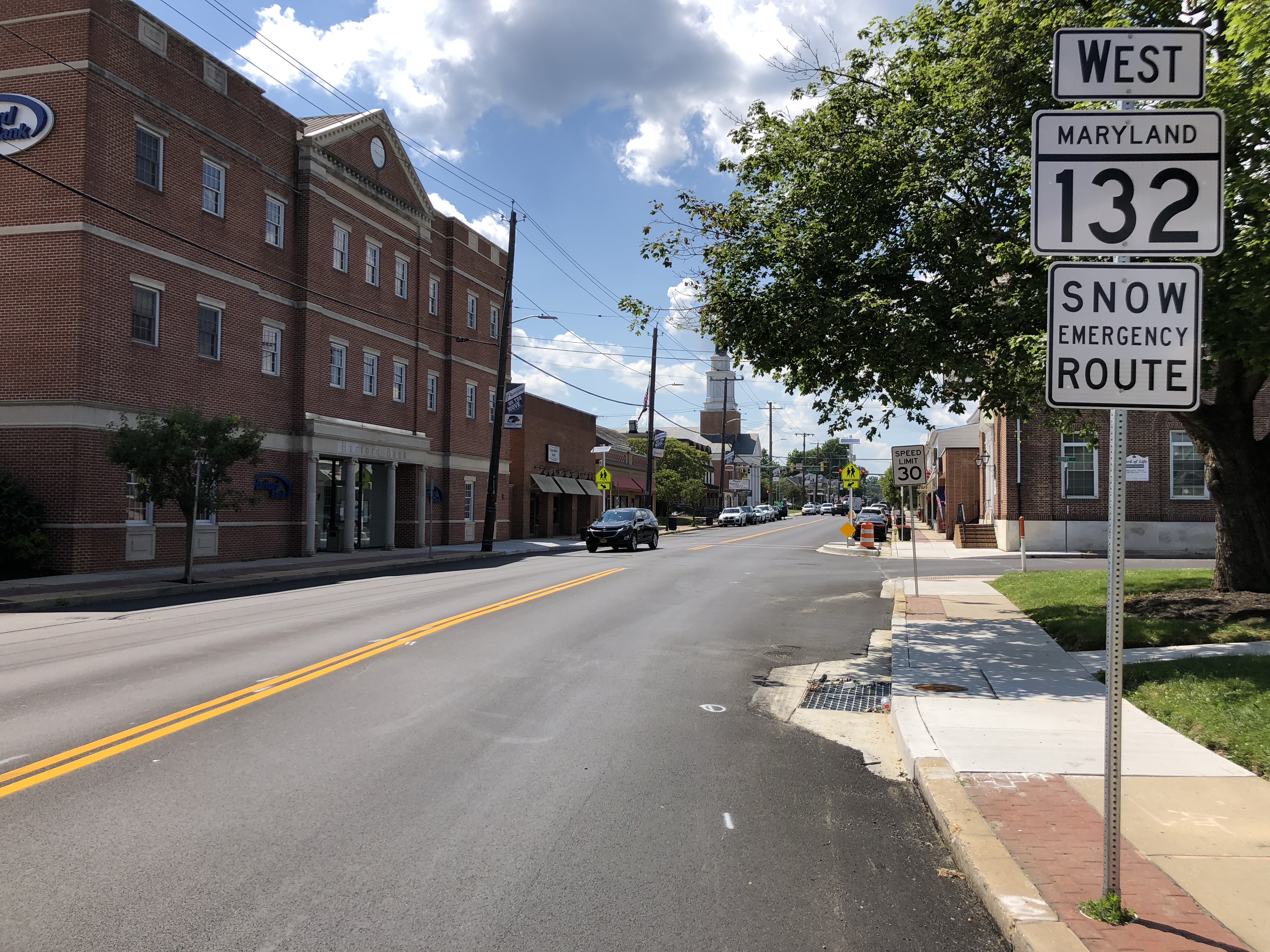
MD 132 westbound in downtown Aberdeen

MD 132 begins at a cul-de-sac adjacent to I-95's interchange with MD 22 just west of the city limits of Aberdeen. The highway immediately receives a ramp from northbound I-95. MD 132 heads east as two-lane undivided Bel Air Avenue through a commercial area and intersects Northeast Road; the north leg of the intersection is a one-lane ramp from eastbound MD 22 that is unsigned MD 132C. MD 132's next intersection is with Bush Chapel Road and Beards Hill Road. Beards Hill Road, which is unsigned MD 132A, provides access to MD 22 (Aberdeen Thruway) and that highway's interchange with I-95 a short distance to the west. MD 132 continues east through residential neighborhoods of Aberdeen, where the highway meets the southern end of MD 462 (Paradise Road) and passes the historic James B. Baker House.

MD 132 crosses CSX's Philadelphia Subdivision railroad line at-grade and enters downtown Aberdeen, where the highway intersects US 40 (Philadelphia Boulevard). Adjacent to the intersection is the Aberdeen station, which is a stop for Amtrak and MARC's Penn Line. Immediately east of US 40, MD 132 makes a right angle turn south and crosses over Amtrak's Northeast Corridor railroad line on an S-curve. The state highway reaches its eastern terminus just south of the end of the bridge at its intersection with Norman Avenue and federal government-maintained APG Road in a residential neighborhood. Both streets connect with Post Road, which heads north as a municipal street toward MD 132B.

=== Aberdeen–Havre de Grace ===
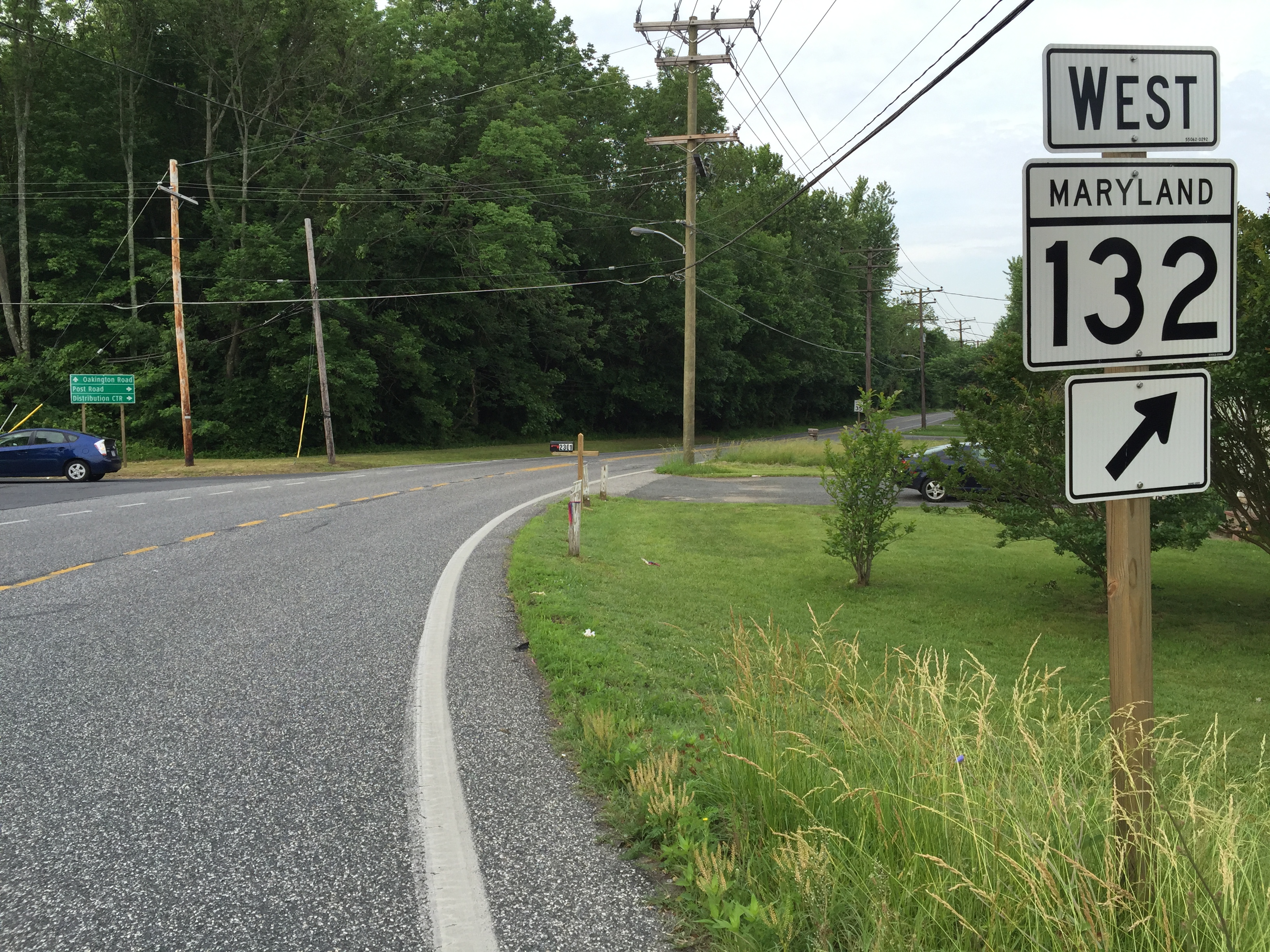
View west from the east end of MD 132 at US 40 near Havre de Grace

MD 132B begins at an intersection with MD 22 (Aberdeen Thruway) on the east side of Aberdeen. The state highway heads northeast as Post Road, a two-lane undivided highway that passes between residential subdivisions and distribution centers. MD 132 leaves the city of Aberdeen and crosses Swan Creek before curving northwest and meeting Oakington Road on a tangent. Oakington Road leads to the Oakington community, which contained the farm of former U.S. Senator Millard E. Tydings. MD 132B's name changes to Oakington Road for the highway's final stretch, a crossing over Amtrak Northeast Corridor immediately to the south of the highway's terminus at US 40 (Pulaski Highway).

== History ==
MD 132 and MD 132B are the old alignment of MD 22 in the Aberdeen area. MD 132 west of Paradise Road and MD 132B north of its southern terminus were constructed as macadam roads around 1911. Bel Air Avenue east of Paradise Road and Post Road south to Bel Air Avenue east of downtown Aberdeen were constructed as a concrete road in 1917. When the Maryland State Roads Commission first assigned route numbers in 1927, Bel Air Avenue was designated MD 22 and Post Road became part of US 40. US 40 was moved to its present alignment between Aberdeen and Havre de Grace between 1930 and 1933; Post Road was renumbered as an extension of MD 22 by 1939.

In 1969, MD 22 was transferred to the newly completed Aberdeen Thruway. MD 132 was assigned to MD 22's old alignment east of the I-95 interchange at that time. Beards Hill Road was reconstructed as a divided highway between MD 132 and MD 22 and the ramps from northbound I-95 to MD 132 and from eastbound MD 22 to MD 132 were constructed by 1972. MD 132's S-curve bridge over the Amtrak Northeast Corridor was completed in 1983, replacing Bel Air Avenue's at-grade crossing of the railroad. Bel Air Avenue east of the Amtrak line and Post Road south of MD 22 were removed from the state highway system around 1989.

== Junction list ==
=== MD 132 ===
The entire route is in Aberdeen, Harford County.

mi	km	Destinations	Notes
0.000	0.000	Cul-de-sac	Dead end; western terminus of MD 132
0.018	0.029	I-95	Ramp from I-95 northbound only; part of exit 85; no direct access to I-95 from MD 132
0.15	0.24	Northeast Road west	North leg of intersection is one-lane, unsigned MD 135C
0.42	0.68	Beards Hill Road north / Bush Chapel Road south to MD 22 / I-95	Beards Hill Road is unsigned MD 132A
1.16	1.87	MD 462 north (Paradise Road)	Southern terminus of MD 462
1.82	2.93	US 40 (Philadelphia Boulevard) – Havre de Grace, Edgewood	
2.15	3.46	APG Road south / Norman Avenue	Eastern terminus of MD 132; Norman Avenue is one way street, inbound access only; continues south as APG Road
1.000 mi = 1.609 km; 1.000 km = 0.621 mi: Incomplete access

=== MD 132B ===
The entire route is in Harford County.

Location	mi	km	Destinations	Notes
Aberdeen	0.00	0.00	MD 22 (Aberdeen Thruway) – Aberdeen Proving Ground, Bel Air	Southern terminus of MD 132B
Havre de Grace	1.43	2.30	US 40 (Pulaski Highway) – Aberdeen, Perryville	Northern terminus of MD 132B
1.000 mi = 1.609 km; 1.000 km = 0.621 mi

== Auxiliary routes ==
- MD 132A is the designation for a 0.24-mile (0.39 km) section of Beards Hill Road that connects MD 132 with MD 22. MD 132A was reconstructed as a four-lane divided highway and brought into the state highway system by 1972.
- MD 132C is the designation for an unnamed one-lane 0.14-mile (0.23 km) ramp from eastbound MD 22 to MD 132 just east of MD 132's western terminus. The ramp has existed since at least 1972; however, it was not designated MD 132C until 2007.
