= Havre de Grace Seaplane Base =

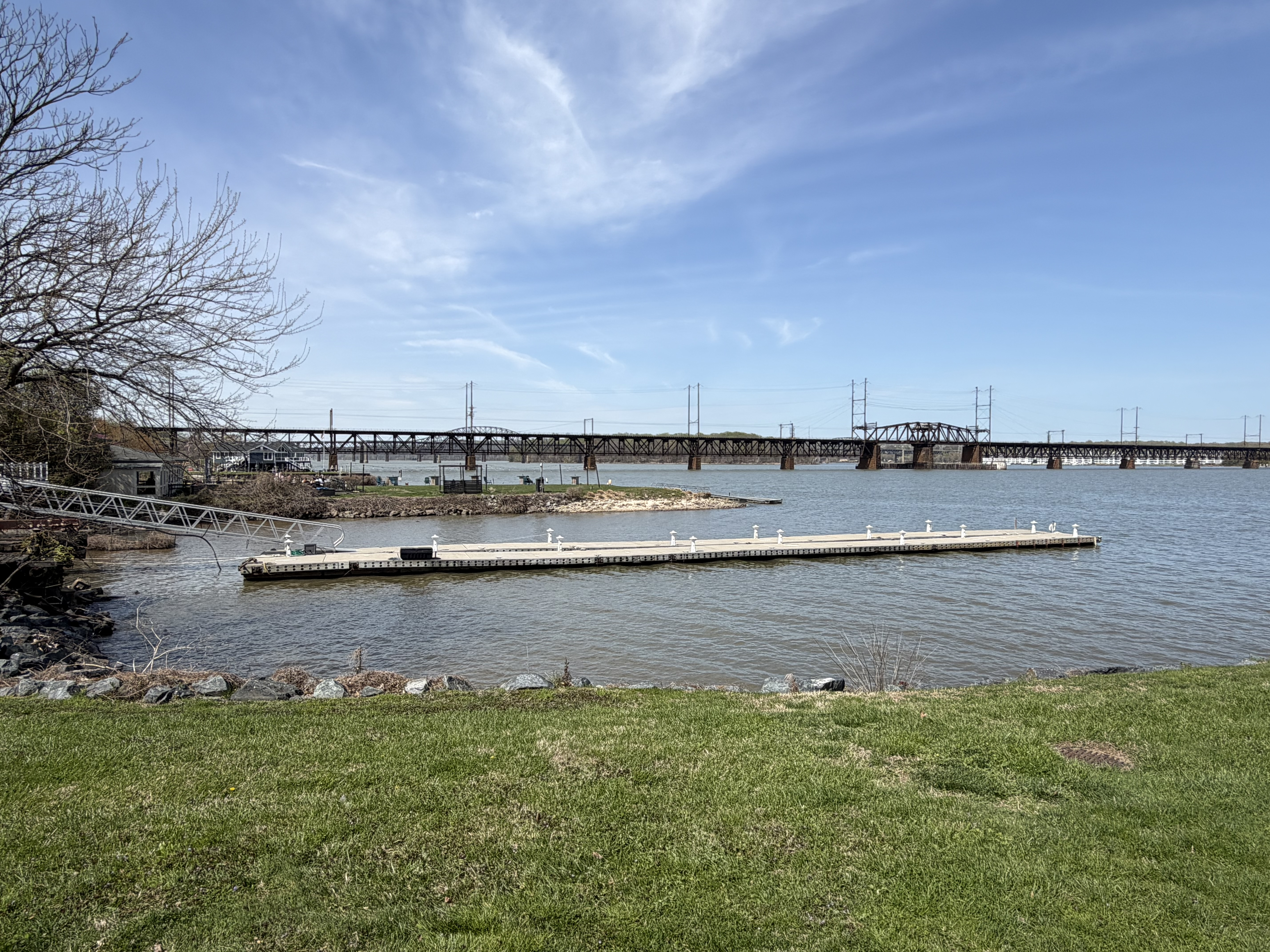
- The dock of the Havre de Grace Seaplane Base in 2026
- IATA: none; ICAO: none; FAA LID: M06

Summary
- Airport type: Public
- Serves: Havre de Grace, Maryland
- Elevation AMSL: 0 ft (0 m)
- Coordinates: 39°33′02″N 076°05′19″W

Map
- Location of airport in Maryland

Runways
Direction	Length		Surface
Direction	ft	m	Surface
E/W	8,000	2,438	Water
N/S	8,000	2,438	Water

Statistics (2023)
- Aircraft operations (year ending 3/24/2023): 30
- Source: Federal Aviation Administration. Coordinates from WikiMapia

Havre de Grace Seaplane Base (FAA LID: M06) is a privately owned, public-use seaplane base located one nautical mile (2 km) east of the central business district of Havre de Grace, a city in Harford County, Maryland, United States. It is located on the west side of Chesapeake Bay.

== Facilities and aircraft ==
The publicly-used Seaplane Base is located at the mouth of the Chesapeake Bay, on the Susquehanna River. Pilots land aircraft on the water then taxi to the loading dock. The floating airport includes a docking and storage facility for aircraft, similar to a land-based terminal. Havre de Grace Seaplane Base covers an area of 2 acres (0.81 ha) and has two seaplane landing areas designated N/S and E/W, each measuring 8,000 x 200 ft (2,438 x 61 m). For the 12-month period ending March 24, 2023, the airport had 30 general aviation aircraft operations.
