= Scarboro Landfill =

Coordinates: 39.641683°N 76.299322°W

The Scarboro Landfill is a closed, unlined municipal landfill in Street, Harford County, Maryland. It operated from approximately 1956 until 1986 and now occupies part of the county-owned Harford Waste Disposal Center (HWDC), whose newer landfill is lined and remains in operation. Groundwater contamination discovered in the 1980s led to state-supervised remediation and long-term monitoring; a 1998 remedial investigation found no unacceptable risks to human health or the environment.

== History and environmental investigation ==
The Scarboro Landfill received municipal waste from approximately 1956 until 1986. It received a formal operating permit in 1980. In 1985, the state issued a permit for its closure and for construction of the new Harford Waste Disposal Center landfill, which opened in July 1987. Portions of the former Scarboro Landfill were subsequently covered by lined landfill cells at the HWDC.

Volatile organic compounds (VOCs) were detected in groundwater at the landfill between 1984 and 1986, prompting the state to require a hydrogeological investigation. A 1991 investigation identified a limited area of groundwater contamination southwest of the landfill containing chlorinated hydrocarbons, freon, ketones, manganese, nickel and lead. Low levels of organic compounds were also detected in some domestic wells located hydraulically upgradient of the landfill, but investigators determined that those contaminants came from other sources.

A second investigation completed in 1993 recommended groundwater remediation. In 1994, the United States Environmental Protection Agency accepted Scarboro into its State Deferral Pilot Program, under which the Maryland Department of the Environment (MDE) oversaw evaluation and remediation in a manner paralleling the federal Superfund program. A December 1994 administrative consent order required Harford County to conduct a remedial investigation and feasibility study, operate an interim groundwater remediation system, perform long-term groundwater monitoring, and undertake community participation.

The remedial investigation submitted to MDE in 1998 found no unacceptable risks to human health or the environment. The accompanying feasibility study nevertheless called for institutional controls, landfill capping, continued groundwater remediation and long-term monitoring to address contamination at the site. Harford County began operating a groundwater remediation system in February 1998. County budget documents continue to identify operation and monitoring of the treatment system as requirements of the MDE consent order and permit conditions.

== Harford Waste Disposal Center ==
The modern Harford Waste Disposal Center is a separate lined sanitary landfill located on the same property and partially overlying the former Scarboro Landfill. The facility includes the county's municipal solid-waste landfill, public drop-off facilities, and recycling and compost operations.

In 2008, an independent operational review of the HWDC conducted in response to complaints from neighboring residents identified problems involving safety, dust, litter, erosion, runoff and operational efficiency. Harford County subsequently adopted a 56-point corrective action plan. Later that year, MDE issued a complaint, order and proposed $10,000 penalty against Harford County for violations of refuse-disposal permit requirements.

== See also ==
- Landfills in the United States
- Environment of the United States
- Waste in the United States
