= Susquehanna Symphony Orchestra =

The Susquehanna Symphony Orchestra is a performing community ensemble based in Harford County, Maryland.

The orchestra was founded in the late 1970s by Sheldon Bair as the Harford Community Orchestra, and changed its name to "The Susquehanna Symphony Orchestra" in 1982.

The orchestra is an all-volunteer ensemble of about 70 musicians from many professions. The musicians rehearse together once a week. It performs a four concert series during the school year and one to two pop concerts in the summer.

In addition to performing pieces composed by Bair himself, the orchestra has premiered many pieces, including two by Henry Cowell, and works by David Finko, Kile Smith, Gwyneth Walker, Sean O'Boyle, Theldon Myers, Sir Malcolm Arnold, and others. The symphony and its director, Sheldon Bair, are known for performing relatively obscure works of music by well-known composers. The symphony also champions living composers and encourage those composers to attend their concerts. Guest artists hosted by the SSO include Alexander Skwortsow, the Edinburgh String Quartet, David Amram, the Penn State Choir and members of the Cleveland Orchestra and the Baltimore Symphony Orchestra. During the 2007–2008 season the orchestra performed for Poland's independence day at St. Patrick's Cathedral in New York City.

== Carnegie Hall ==
After working with the orchestra for their 2007 St. Patrick's concert, the orchestra was again invited to New York City by Polish conductor Jan Sporek. On October 18, 2009, the orchestra performed at Carnegie Hall as part of Sporek's 20th anniversary celebration. David Dubal and Olek Krupa hosted the event honoring Sporek's 20 years of artistic work in the United States.
