= Havre De Grace Police Department =

Coordinates: 39°30′41.49″N 76°09′52.16″W

- Common name: Havre De Grace Police Department
- Abbreviation: HDGPD
- Motto: "The fundamental mission of the Havre de Grace Police Department is to protect life and property and enforce the law in a fair and impartial manner"

Agency overview
- Preceding agency: Municipal Police

Jurisdictional structure
- Operations jurisdiction: Havre De Grace, Maryland, USA
- Population: 13,392 (2012, Estimated)
- Legal jurisdiction: Incorporated Havre De Grace, MD
- General nature: Local civilian police

Operational structure
- Headquarters: 715 Pennington Ave
- Agency executive: Johnathan Krass, Chief of Police

Website
- HDGPD Official Site

The Havre De Grace Police Department (HDGPD) is a full-service agency servicing the incorporated municipality of Havre De Grace, Maryland. Established in 1981, HDGPD is Havre De Grace's primary law enforcement agency.

== Chief ==
The Chief is Johnathan Krass.

== Divisions ==
The department consists of the following divisions and specialized units:

- Administration
- Communications
- Criminal Investigations Division
- K-9 Unit
- Narcotics Task Force*
- Patrol
- SWAT*

*The Narcotics Task Force & SWAT Team are both multi-jurisdictional and composed of members from the Havre De Grace Police Department and other local police agencies.

== Rank structure and insignia ==
Title	Insignia	Duties
Chief		Directs Police Department
Captain		Patrol & Operations Commander
Sergeant (SGT)		Specialized Unit / Shift Supervisor
Corporal (CPL)		First Line Supervisor
Patrolman First Class (PFC)		Road Patrol / Specialized Units, first official rank after Probation
Detective (DET)		Investigates Serious Crime, is a Specialty, not an official rank
Officer (OFF)		Road Patrol, basic rank upon completion of academy
