= Maryland Route 22 =

State highway in Harford County, Maryland, US

Maryland Route 22
- Maryland Route 22 highlighted in red

Route information
- Maintained by MDSHA
- Length: 12.91 mi (20.78 km)
- Existed: 1927–present

Major junctions
- West end: US 1 Bus. / MD 924 in Bel Air
- MD 543 at Fountain Green; MD 136 in Churchville; MD 155 in Churchville; MD 156 near Churchville; I-95 in Aberdeen; MD 462 in Aberdeen; US 40 in Aberdeen
- East end: Aberdeen Proving Ground in Aberdeen

Location
- Country: United States
- State: Maryland
- Counties: Harford

Highway system
- Maryland highway system; Interstate; US; State; Scenic Byways
← MD 21	→ MD 23

Maryland Route 22 (MD 22) is a state highway in the U.S. state of Maryland. The state highway runs 12.91 miles (20.78 km) from U.S. Route 1 Business (US 1 Business) and MD 924 in Bel Air east to an entrance to Aberdeen Proving Ground in Aberdeen. MD 22 is the main connection between the county seat of Bel Air and Aberdeen, which is the largest city in Harford County. The state highway also provides the primary route between Interstate 95 (I-95) and Aberdeen Proving Ground.

MD 22 was one of the original state roads marked for improvement in 1909 and one of the original state-numbered highways in 1927. The highway was constructed between Bel Air and Aberdeen in the early 1910s. Another section of highway between Aberdeen and Havre de Grace, the Post Road, was also built in the early 1910s. The Post Road became part of US 40 in 1927 but was designated as an extension of MD 22 after US 40 was relocated in the early 1930s. MD 22 was reconstructed from Bel Air to Aberdeen in the 1950s. MD 22's present course east of I-95 was built in the late 1960s; the old section of MD 22 through Aberdeen became MD 132.

== Route description ==
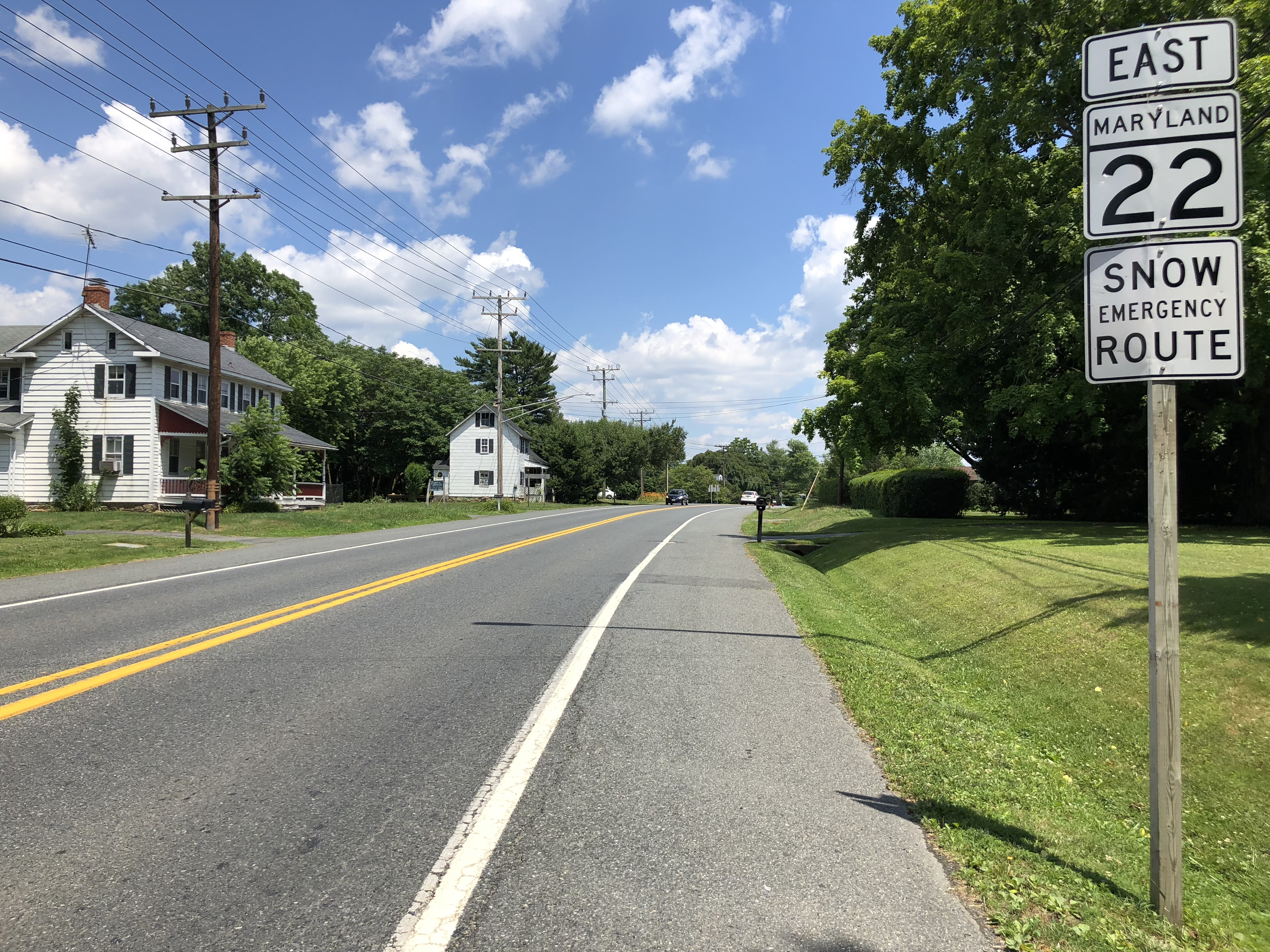
MD 22 eastbound past MD 155 in Churchville

MD 22 begins in the Bel Air Courthouse Historic District in the town of Bel Air as a one-way pair, Fulford Avenue eastbound and Churchville Road westbound, at Main Street. Main Street carries northbound MD 924 and US 1 Business; the business route enters downtown Bel Air from the west on Fulford Avenue. Churchville Road continues west as unsigned MD 922E, which intersects Bond Street, which carries southbound MD 924 and US 1 Business; the business route leaves downtown Bel Air to the west on Churchville Road. The two directions of MD 22 unite at Shamrock Road as Churchville Road, a four-lane divided highway that passes north of Rockfield Park and The John Carroll School. The road heads north of Bynum Run Park, where a park and ride lot is located, as it leaves the town of Bel Air. The state highway crosses over Bynum Run as it passes through Fountain Green, where the highway intersects MD 543 (Fountain Green Road).

East of MD 543, MD 22 reduces to a two-lane undivided road and passes the historic Dibb House and Tudor Hall, the latter notable for being the boyhood home of John Wilkes Booth. The state highway passes through the hamlet of Schucks Corner and intersects Thomas Run Road, which leads to Thomas Run Park, Harford Technical High School, Thomas Run Church, Medical Hall Historic District, and the historic Hays-Heighe House on the campus of Harford Community College. In the unincorporated village of Churchville, MD 22 intersects MD 136 (Calvary Road/Priestford Road) adjacent to the community's namesake, Churchville Presbyterian Church. After meeting the west end of MD 155 (Level Road) immediately to the east, the state highway curves to the south. After MD 156 (Aldino Road) splits to the east, MD 22 returns to an eastward heading to pass through the hamlet of Carsins. The state highway expands to a four-lane highway immediately before intersecting Long Drive, which serves as the entrance to Ripken Stadium, home of the Aberdeen IronBirds baseball team. A park and ride lot is located south of this intersection. Just east of the stadium complex, the state highway meets I-95 (John F. Kennedy Memorial Highway) at a six-ramp partial cloverleaf interchange.

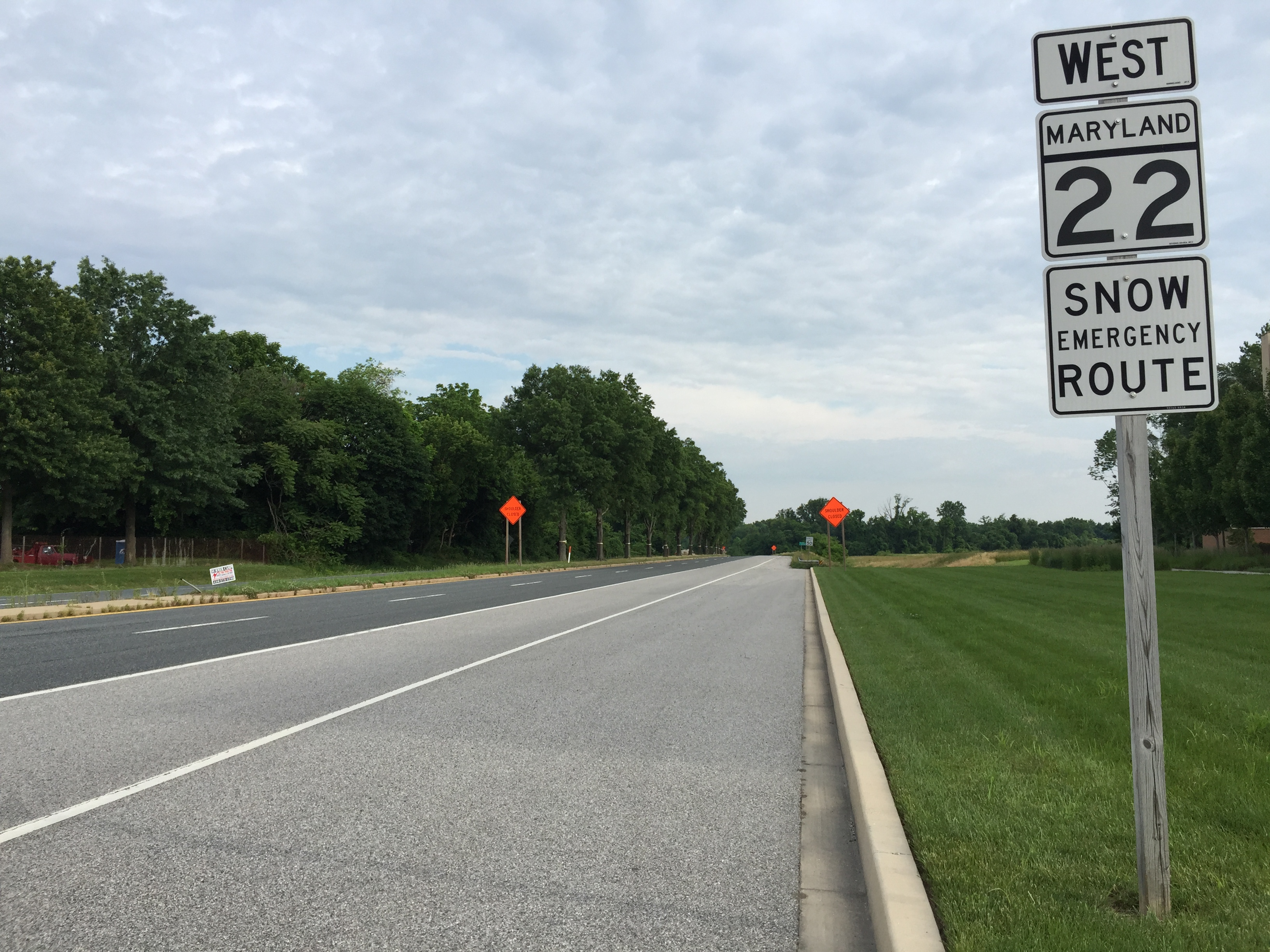
View west from the east end of MD 22 at Aberdeen Proving Ground

MD 22 continues east as Aberdeen Thruway, a four-lane divided highway bypass of downtown Aberdeen that connects I-95 with Aberdeen Proving Ground. Immediately east of I-95, the state highway enters the city limits of Aberdeen and intersects Beards Hill Road. Beards Hill Road heads south as unsigned MD 132A, which leads to MD 132 (Bel Air Avenue), the old alignment of MD 22 that leads to downtown Aberdeen. MD 22 continues east, passing north of University of Maryland Upper Chesapeake Medical Center Aberdeen, through an intersection with MD 462 (Paradise Road) and curves south. The state highway continues through grade-separated crossings of CSX's Philadelphia Subdivision and Amtrak's Northeast Corridor railroad lines northeast of downtown Aberdeen. Squeezed in between the two railroad lines is MD 22's partial cloverleaf interchange with US 40 (Philadelphia Boulevard); several movements between the two highways are provided via Rogers Avenue, which intersects MD 22 between the bridges across the Philadelphia Subdivision and US 40. East of the railroads, the highway intersects Post Road, which heads north as another section of MD 132 (officially MD 132B), before reaching its eastern terminus at Bel Air Avenue just west of an entrance to Aberdeen Proving Ground. This gate is open from 5:00 am to midnight and allows entry for persons with a Government ID; visitors must use the gate along MD 715. The highway continues onto the military base as Harford Boulevard.

MD 22 is a part of the National Highway System for its entire length. The highway is a part of the main National Highway System from I-95 to Aberdeen Proving Ground and as a principal arterial from MD 924 in Bel Air to I-95.

== History ==
MD 22 was one of the original state roads marked for improvement by the Maryland State Roads Commission in 1909. The highway was part of the original main road from Baltimore to Aberdeen and Havre de Grace that passed through Bel Air. The Post Road, also known as the Philadelphia Road, did not become the main connection between Baltimore and Aberdeen until the 1920s. The highway from Bel Air to Churchville, part of the Bel Air Road extending west from Havre de Grace, was already improved beyond a rudimentary dirt road by 1910. The highway from Churchville to Paradise Road in Aberdeen was constructed in 1911. The portion of the state road between Bel Air and Churchville was reconstructed in 1913. The Post Road between Aberdeen and Havre de Grace was constructed as a state aid road around 1911. All three segments were constructed as a 14-foot (4.3 m) wide macadam road. The original construction did not include the portions of Bel Air Avenue and the Post Road within the limits of Aberdeen. The portion of Bel Air Avenue from Paradise Road to the Post Road and the Post Road from there to approximately the modern intersection of MD 22 and MD 132B were rebuilt as a 17-foot (5.2 m) wide concrete road in 1917. By 1920, the road was part of the Capitol Trail, an auto trail linking Atlanta and Philadelphia via Washington, D.C.

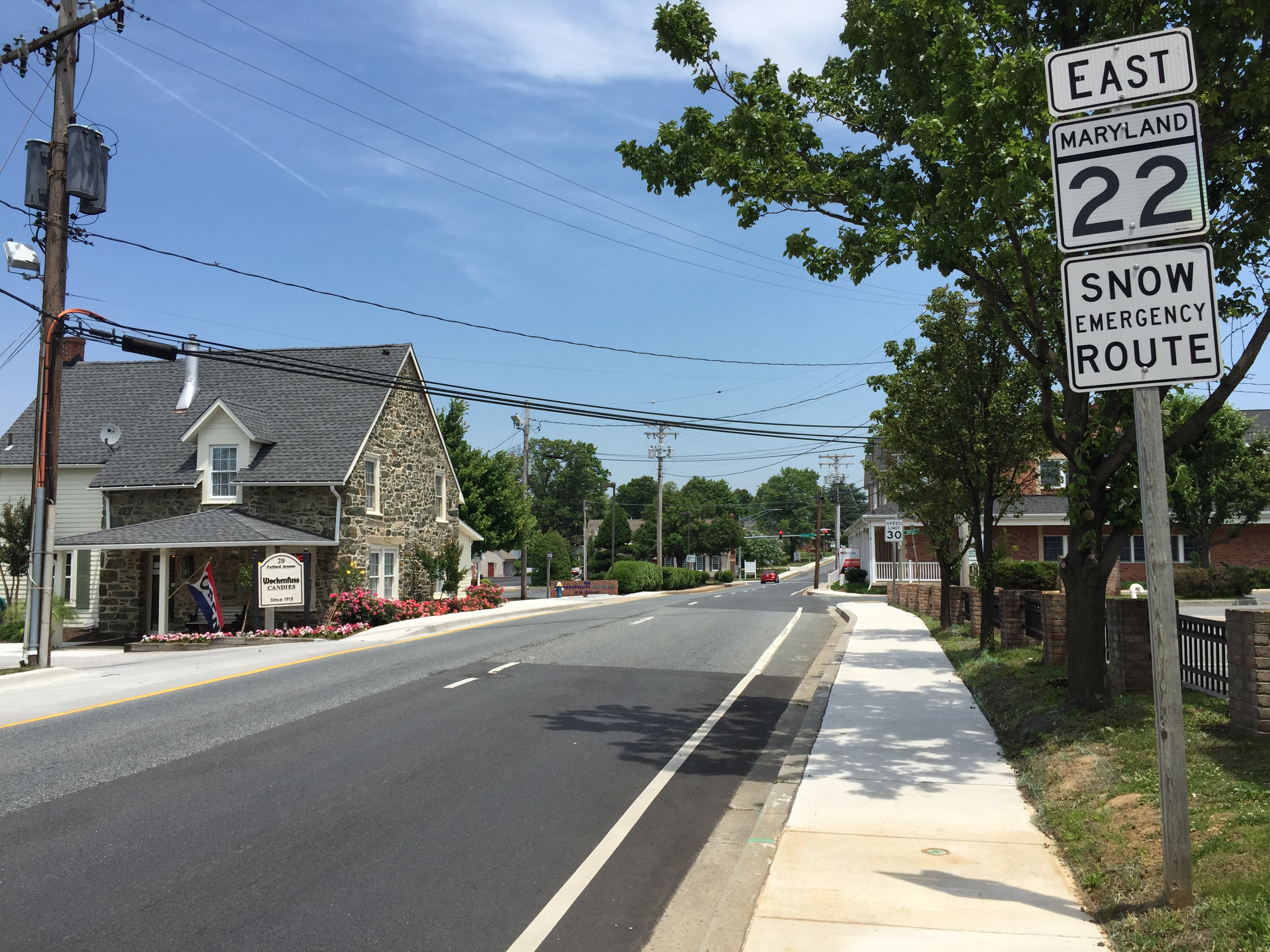
MD 22 eastbound past US 1 Business and MD 924 in Bel Air

MD 22 was widened to 17 feet (5.2 m) with the addition of 3-foot (0.91 m) wide concrete shoulders around 1926, just before the highway became one of the original state-numbered highways in 1927. The Post Road became part of US 40 the same year. Both MD 22 and US 40 from Aberdeen to Havre de Grace were widened to 20 feet (6.1 m) by 1930. US 40 was relocated from the Post Road to its present alignment from Aberdeen to Havre de Grace between 1930 and 1933. MD 22 was extended north along the Post Road to MD 132B's present northern terminus by 1939. Work to further modernize MD 22 began in 1951 when Churchville Road from Bel Air to MD 156 near Churchville was straightened, widened, and resurfaced. The Bel Air–Churchville work was completed in 1953; the following year, the MD 22–MD 155 intersection was reconstructed. MD 22 from MD 156 to US 40 in Aberdeen was widened and resurfaced between 1954 and 1956.

The Aberdeen Thruway was constructed to improve the east–west connection between I-95, US 40, and Aberdeen Proving Ground and to provide grade separated crossings of the Baltimore and Ohio Railroad (now CSX), Pennsylvania Railroad (now Amtrak), and US 40. The grade separations had been contemplated as early as 1942. Construction on the relocation of MD 22 began in 1967 and was completed in 1969. The old alignment of MD 22 from I-95 east and north through Aberdeen to US 40 near Havre de Grace was designated MD 132. Beards Hill Road was reconstructed as a divided highway between MD 132 and MD 22 and the ramps from northbound I-95 to MD 132 and from eastbound MD 22 to MD 132 were constructed by 1972. The western end of MD 22 was changed to a one-way pair when Fulford Avenue was added to the state highway system as eastbound MD 22 in Bel Air in 1979. The state highway was expanded to a divided highway from the east end of the one-way pair to MD 543 between 1994 and 1999. MD 22 was expanded to a four-lane divided highway from the I-95 overpass west to Long Drive in 2004 concurrent with the transformation of the original diamond interchange with I-95 to a partial cloverleaf with collector-distributor lanes.

== Junction list ==
The entire route is in Harford County.

Location	mi	km	Destinations	Notes
Bel Air	0.00	0.00	US 1 Bus. north / MD 924 north (Main Street) – Hickory, Forest Hill	Western terminus
Fountain Green	2.05	3.30	MD 543 (Fountain Green Road) – Hickory, Riverside	
Churchville	5.50	8.85	MD 136 (Priestford Road/Calvary Road) – Creswell, Dublin	
Churchville	5.62	9.04	MD 155 east (Level Road) – Havre de Grace	Western terminus of MD 155
Churchville	6.32	10.17	MD 156 east (Aldino Road) – Aldino	Western terminus of MD 156
Aberdeen	9.82	15.80	I-95 (John F. Kennedy Memorial Highway) – Baltimore, New York	I-95 Exit 85
Aberdeen	10.30	16.58	Beards Hill Road to MD 132	Beards Hill Road south is officially MD 132A
Aberdeen	11.01	17.72	MD 462 (Paradise Road)	
Aberdeen	11.84	19.05	US 40 (Philadelphia Boulevard) – Havre de Grace, Aberdeen	Partial cloverleaf interchange
Aberdeen	12.91	20.78	Entrance to Aberdeen Proving Ground	Eastern terminus
1.000 mi = 1.609 km; 1.000 km = 0.621 mi

== Auxiliary routes ==
- MD 22A is the designation for Old Section MD 22, a 0.13-mile (0.21 km) section of old alignment of MD 22 that serves several houses on the westbound side of MD 22 immediately to the west of the MD 22–I-95 interchange. MD 22A was designated in 2004 when MD 22 was relocated slightly to the south as part of the construction of the divided highway to the west of I-95.
- MD 22B is the designation for Old MD 22 Spur, a 0.02-mile (0.032 km) road connecting MD 22 north to MD 22A. MD 22B was designated in 2011.
