= Fallston Airport =

Airport near Fallston, Maryland, US

- IATA: none; ICAO: none; FAA LID: W42

Summary
- Owner/Operator: Fallston Airport & Flying Service, Inc.
- Serves: Fallston, Maryland
- Built: June 1960
- Elevation AMSL: 460 ft / 140 m
- Coordinates: 39°30′05″N 76°24′41″W

Map
- Location of airport in Maryland

Runways
| Direction | Length | | Surface |
| Direction | ft | m | Surface |
|---|---|---|---|
| 4-22 | 2,200 | 671 | Asphalt |

Statistics (2015)
- 98 operations per week

Fallston Airport (FAA LID: W42) is an airport located southeast of Fallston, Maryland, United States.

== History ==
The airport is built adjacent to the historic Reed farm.
