= Aldino, Maryland =

Unincorporated community in Maryland, United States

- Unincorporated community
- Location within Maryland Location within the United States
- Coordinates: 39°33′50″N 76°11′45″W
- Country: United States
- State: Maryland
- County: Harford
- Elevation: 390 ft (120 m)
- Time zone: UTC−5 (Eastern (EST))
  - Summer (DST): UTC−4 (EDT)
- Area codes: 410 & 443
- GNIS feature ID: 582872

Aldino is an unincorporated community in Harford County, Maryland, United States. Aldino is located on Maryland Route 156, 4.1 miles (6.6 km) north-northwest of Aberdeen.
