= Hopewell Village, Maryland =

Unincorporated community in Maryland, U.S.

Coordinates: 39°34′44″N 76°11′55″W

Hopewell Village (also, Hopewell Cross Roads) is an unincorporated community in Harford County, Maryland, United States. It lies at an elevation of 449 feet (137 m).
