= Hanway =

Hanway is a surname. Notable people with the surname include:

- Franklin Hanway, American politician
- Jonas Hanway (1712–1786), English traveller and philanthropist
- Mary Ann Hanway, 18th-century English writer and novelist
- T. Littleton Hanway (1846–1921), American politician and merchant
- Tom Hanway (born 1961), American musician

== See also ==
- HanWay Films, a British film distributor
- Hanway Place, a street in London
