= William Benjamin Baker =

American politician (1840–1911)

William B. Baker
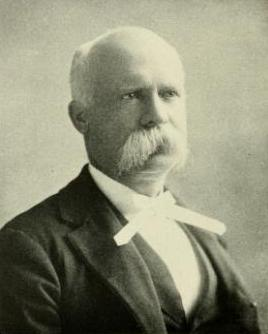
- From Volume I of 1899's Autobiographies and portraits of the President, cabinet, Supreme court, and Fifty-fifth Congress

Member of the Maryland Senate
- In office 1894–1895
- Preceded by: Thomas H. Robinson
- Succeeded by: Charles W. Michael
- Constituency: Harford County
- In office 1906–1909
- Preceded by: Thomas H. Robinson
- Succeeded by: Charles A. Andrew
- Constituency: Harford County

Member of the U.S. House of Representatives from Maryland's 2nd district
- In office March 4, 1895 – March 3, 1901
- Preceded by: Joshua Frederick Cockey Talbott
- Succeeded by: Albert Alexander Blakeney

Member of the Maryland House of Delegates from the Harford County district
- In office 1882–1884 Serving with James B. Preston, Silas Scarboro, David Wiley

Personal details
- Born: July 22, 1840 Aberdeen, Maryland, U.S.
- Died: May 17, 1911 (aged 70) Aberdeen, Maryland, U.S.
- Resting place: Baker's Cemetery; Aberdeen, Maryland, U.S.
- Party: Republican
- Spouses: Olivia Wells (m. 1868, died) Mary C. Hollis (m. 1872)
- Children: 3
- Relatives: John H. Baker (uncle); Frank E. Baker (nephew)
- Occupation: Politician; canner

William Benjamin Baker (July 22, 1840 – May 17, 1911) was a U.S. Congressman who represented the second Congressional district of Maryland from 1895 to 1901. He was considered the father of rural mail delivery in the United States.

== Early life ==
William Benjamin Baker was born on July 22, 1840, near Aberdeen, Maryland, to Elizabeth (née Greenland) and George W. Baker. He was one of fifteen children, including Sarah R., George A., Lydia C., James B., Charles W., John H., Susie E., Alice C. and George A. His father was a canner in Aberdeen. He attended the common schools and was privately tutored. He remained on the family's homestead until he was 32 years old. His nephew Frank E. Baker was a state delegate. His uncle was John H. Baker, a state delegate and preacher.

== Career ==
In 1872, Baker and his brother Charles W. started a canning factory in Aberdeen. They ran the factory until 1876, when the building was destroyed by a fire. He then erected another cannery on a farm in Aberdeen and a cannery in Odessa, Delaware. He was one of the organizers of the First National Bank of Aberdeen and served as its first president from 1891 to 1911. He also served as president of the Harford County Telephone Company. He helped organize the First National Bank of Aberdeen and was an organizer and director of the First National Bank of Havre de Grace.

He served as a delegate to several state and congressional conventions. He first ran for the Maryland House of Delegates in 1875, but was defeated by Murray Vandiver. He became a member of the House of Delegates in 1881, defeating Vandiver. He served in 1882 and in 1883, he was defeated for re-election. In 1889, he ran for Maryland Senate, but lost by a margin of 550 votes. He was elected to the Maryland Senate in 1893, after his brother John H. Baker withdrew his nomination and defeating Thomas H. Robinson, but only served from 1894 to 1895.

Baker was elected as a Republican to the Fifty-fourth, Fifty-fifth, and Fifty-sixth Congresses, serving from March 4, 1895, to March 3, 1901. He represented the Second Maryland Congressional District which included, at that time, Harford, Baltimore, and Carroll Counties.

He was the father of rural mail delivery. When the matter of rural mail delivery was spoken of in Congress, no one was willing to assume the responsibility, for it was considered controversial to have rural merchants serve as postmasters. Baker, however, was willing for the experiment to be made in his district, and the first rural route of the country was started in Carroll County, from the Westminster post office.

He was not a candidate for renomination in 1900, and resumed the canning business. In 1905, he was elected again to the Maryland Senate. He served from 1906 to 1908. He was defeated for re-election in 1909 by Charles A. Andrew. In 1910, he ran for Congress, but was defeated by Joshua Frederick Cockey Talbott.

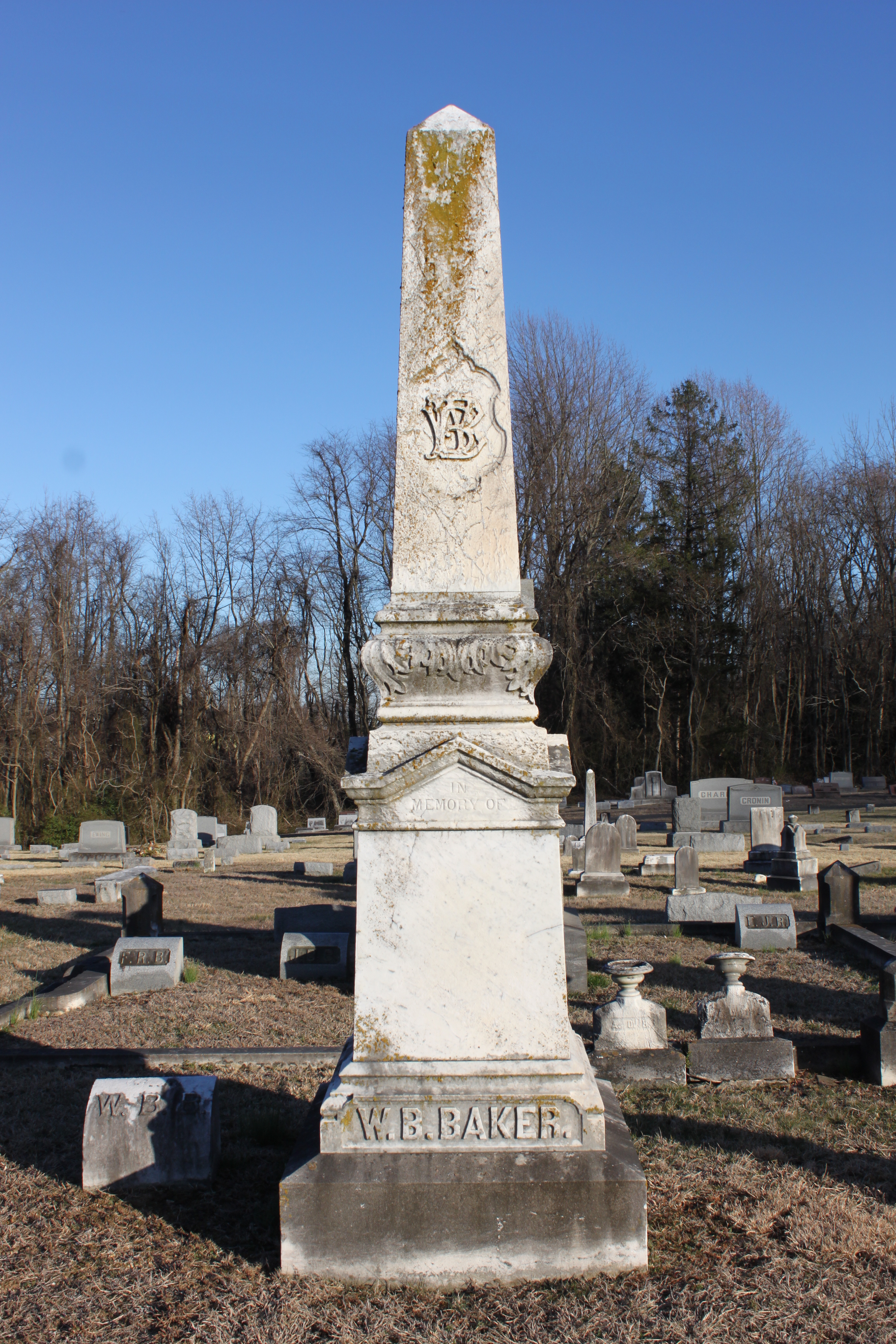
Grave of Baker at Baker Cemetery

== Personal life ==
In 1868, Baker married Olivia Wells, of Aberdeen, who died after 16 months. In 1872 he married again to Mary C. Hollis, of Bush Chapel. They had three children: Jessie M., Nettie F. (later Mrs. Phineas Morris) and Hollis R. Baker.

Baker earned the nickname "the Grand Old Man of Harford" for his service in politics. In March 1911, Baker suffered a stroke. He died on May 17, 1911, in Aberdeen, following a fall a few days prior. He was interred in Baker's Cemetery, the family burial ground, in Aberdeen.

U.S. House of Representatives
Preceded by Joshua Frederick Cockey Talbott	U.S. Congressman from the 2nd district of Maryland; 1895–1901	Succeeded by Albert Blakeney
