= Patrick H. Rutledge =

American politician (1830–1902)

Member of the Maryland House of Delegates from the Harford County district
- In office 1876–1876 Serving with Andrew Boyle and Murray Vandiver

Personal details
- Born: Patrick Henry Rutledge; January 1830
- Died: July 31, 1902 (aged 72) near Upper Cross Roads, Harford County, Maryland, U.S.
- Party: Democratic (1876); Republican (1881)
- Education: Princeton University
- Occupation: Politician; lawyer

Patrick Henry Rutledge (January 1830 – July 31, 1902) was an American politician and lawyer from Maryland. He served as a member of the Maryland House of Delegates, representing Harford County in 1876.

== Early life ==
Patrick Henry Rutledge was born in January 1830. He received his education in the local neighborhood and graduated from Princeton University. He read law under Otho Scott. He was admitted to the bar in Harford County, Maryland, on July 28, 1856.

== Career ==
Rutledge served as a state's attorney of Harford County from 1867 to 1871.

Rutledge was a Democrat. He served as a member of the Maryland House of Delegates, representing Harford County in 1876. He was nominated by the Republican Party for the Maryland House of Delegates in 1881.

== Personal life ==
Rutledge owned a home near Jarrettsville that was nominated for preservation in 1985.

Rutledge died on July 31, 1902, at his home near Upper Cross Roads.
