= 1923 Baltimore mayoral election =

Baltimore mayoral election, 1923
- May 8, 1923

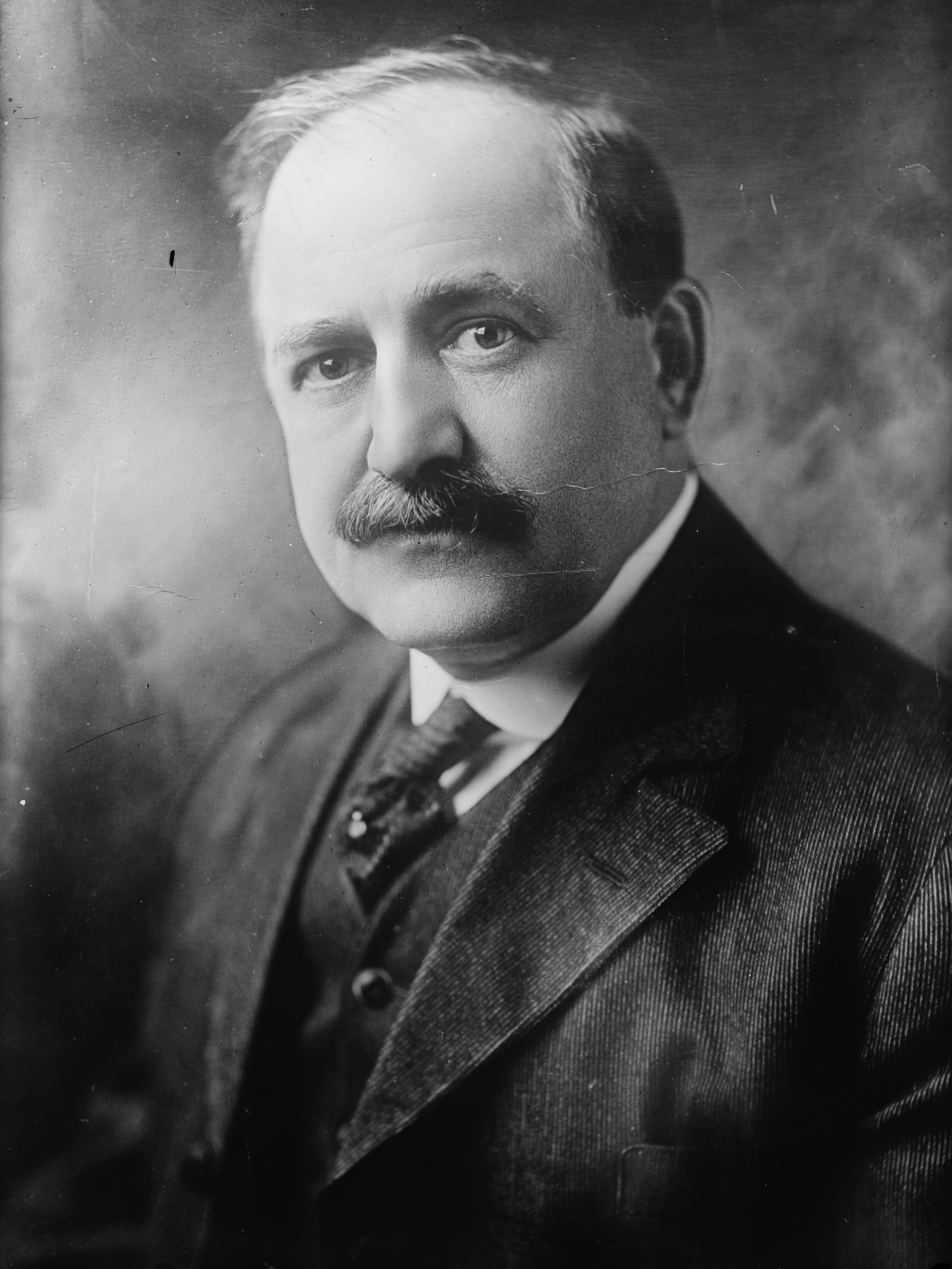

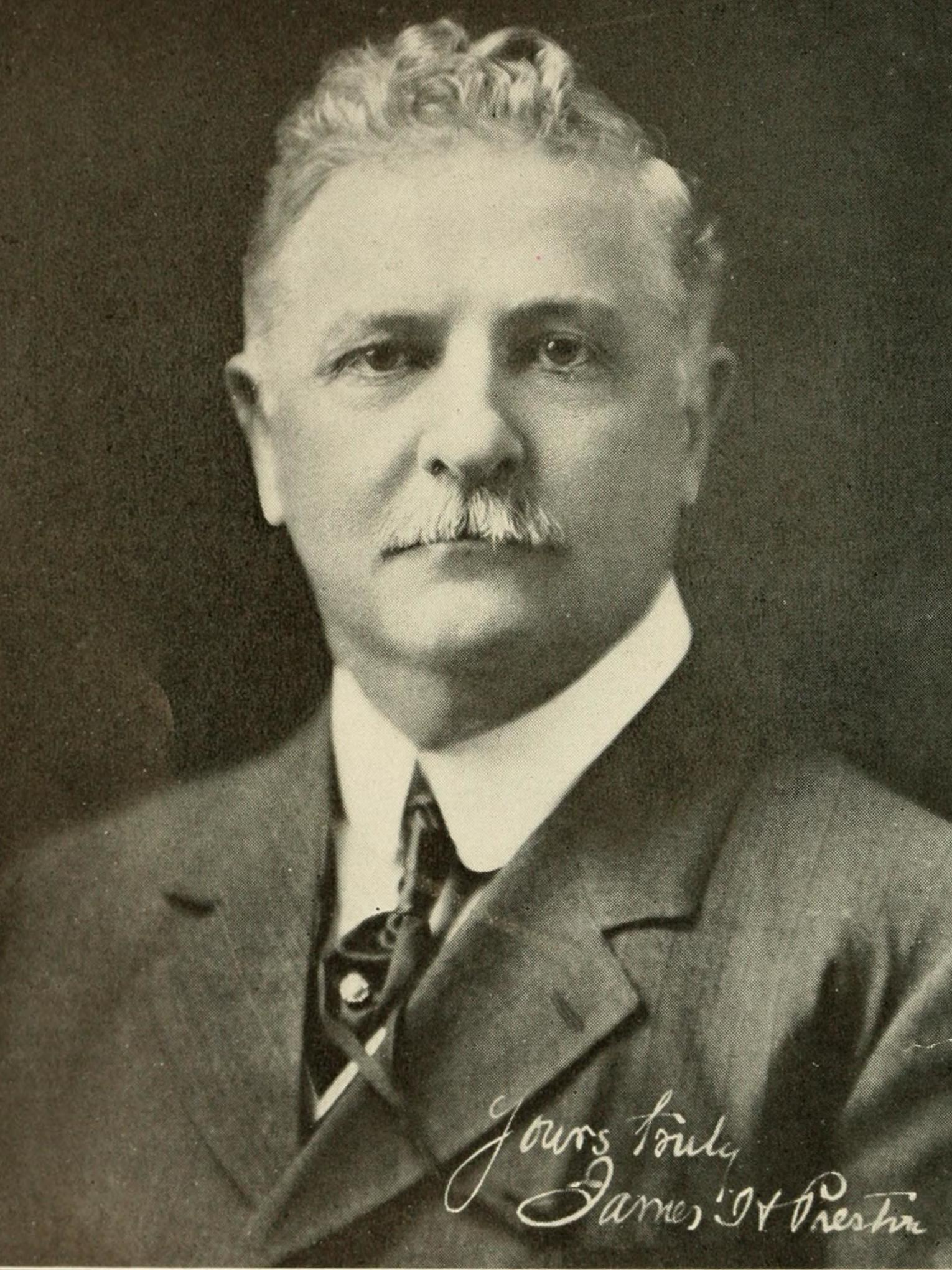
Candidate	Howard W. Jackson	William Frederick Broening	James H. Preston
Party	Democratic	Republican	Citizens
Popular vote	74,124	49,919	39,042
Percentage	45.45%	30.61%	23.94%
Mayor before election
William Frederick Broening
Republican
Elected mayor
Howard W. Jackson
Democratic

The 1923 Baltimore mayoral election saw the election of Howard W. Jackson.

== General election ==
The general election was held May 8, 1923.

Baltimore mayoral general election, 1923
Party	Candidate	Votes	%
Democratic	Howard W. Jackson	74,124	45.45%
Republican	William Frederick Broening (incumbent)	49,919	30.61%
Citizens	James H. Preston	39,042	23.94%
Total votes		163,085	
