= 1926 Maryland Attorney General election =

- November 2, 1926
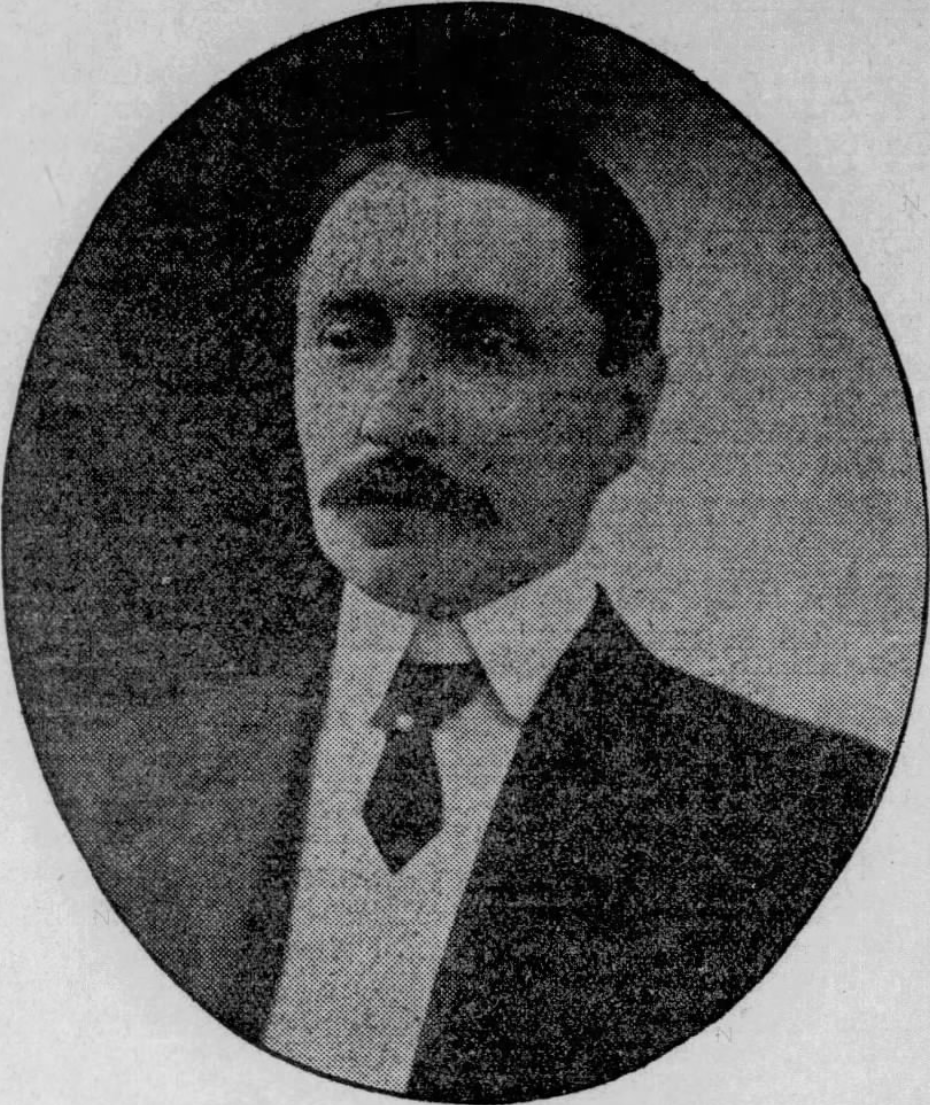

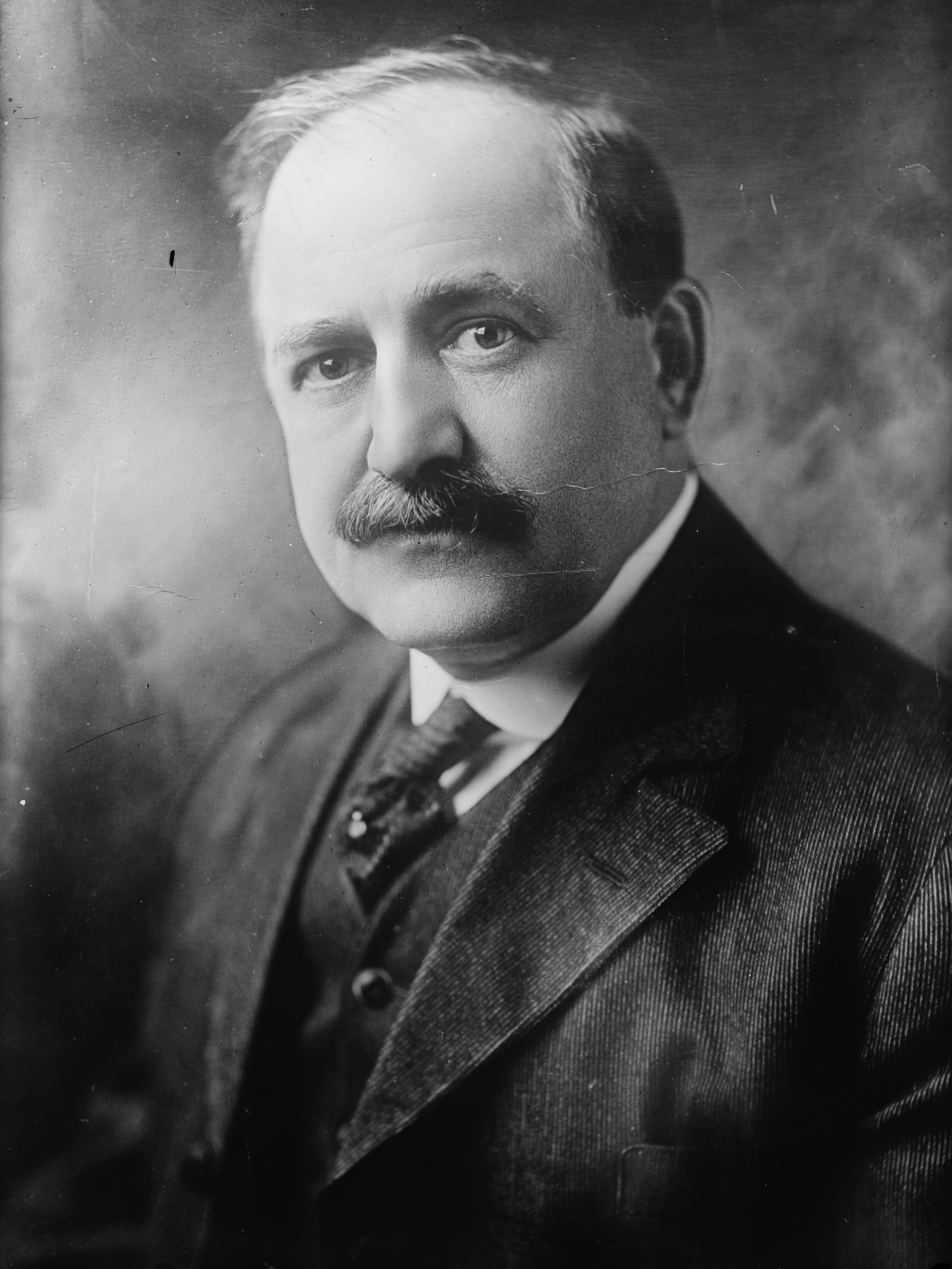
Nominee	Thomas H. Robinson	William Frederick Broening
Party	Democratic	Republican
Popular vote	184,337	148,055
Percentage	54.97%	44.15%
- County results Robinson: 50–60% 60–70% Broening: 50–60% 60–70%
Attorney General before election
Thomas H. Robinson
Democratic
Elected Attorney General
Thomas H. Robinson
Democratic

The 1926 Maryland attorney general election was held on November 2, 1926, in order to elect the attorney general of Maryland. Democratic nominee and incumbent attorney general Thomas H. Robinson defeated Republican nominee and former Mayor of Baltimore William Frederick Broening and Socialist nominee John A. Orman.

== General election ==
On election day, November 2, 1926, Democratic nominee Thomas H. Robinson won re-election by a margin of 36,282 votes against his foremost opponent Republican nominee William Frederick Broening, thereby retaining Democratic control over the office of attorney general. Robinson was sworn in for his second term on January 3, 1927.

=== Results ===
Maryland Attorney General election, 1926
Party	Candidate	Votes	%
Democratic	Thomas H. Robinson (incumbent)	184,337	54.97
Republican	William Frederick Broening	148,055	44.15
Socialist	John A. Orman	2,951	0.88
Total votes		335,343	100.00
Democratic hold			
