= 1930 Maryland Attorney General election =

- November 4, 1930
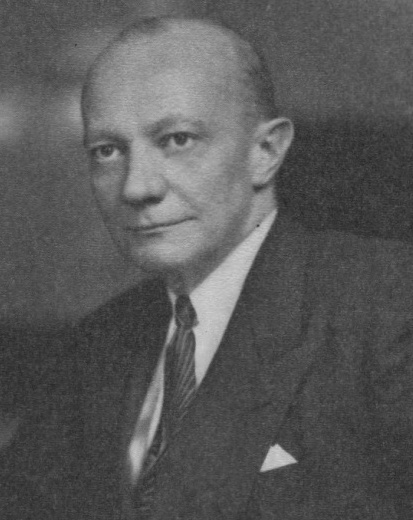

Nominee	William Preston Lane Jr.	David A. Robb
Party	Democratic	Republican
Popular vote	268,370	183,172
Percentage	58.51%	39.94%
- County results Lane: 50–60% 60–70% Robb: 50–60% 60–70%
Attorney General before election
Thomas H. Robinson
Democratic
Elected Attorney General
William Preston Lane Jr.
Democratic

The 1930 Maryland attorney general election was held on November 4, 1930, in order to elect the attorney general of Maryland. Democratic nominee William Preston Lane Jr. defeated Republican nominee David A. Robb, Socialist nominee William A. Toole, Labor nominee Word H. Mills and Communist nominee Isidore Samuelson. Incumbent attorney general Thomas H. Robinson had initially been nominated on the Democratic ticket to run for a third term, but died on October 12, 1930. So William Preston Lane Jr. was nominated in his stead for the Democratic ticket.

== General election ==
On election day, November 4, 1930, Democratic nominee William Preston Lane Jr. won the election by a margin of 85,198 votes against his foremost opponent Republican nominee David A. Robb, thereby retaining Democratic control over the office of attorney general. Lane was sworn in as the 31st attorney general of Maryland on January 3, 1931.

=== Results ===
Maryland Attorney General election, 1930
Party	Candidate	Votes	%
Democratic	William Preston Lane Jr.	268,370	58.51
Republican	David A. Robb	183,172	39.94
Socialist	William A. Toole	3,286	0.72
Labor	Word H. Mills	2,880	0.63
Communist	Isidore Samuelson	970	0.20
Total votes		458,678	100.00
Democratic hold			
