= James H. Preston =

American lawyer and politician (1860–1938)

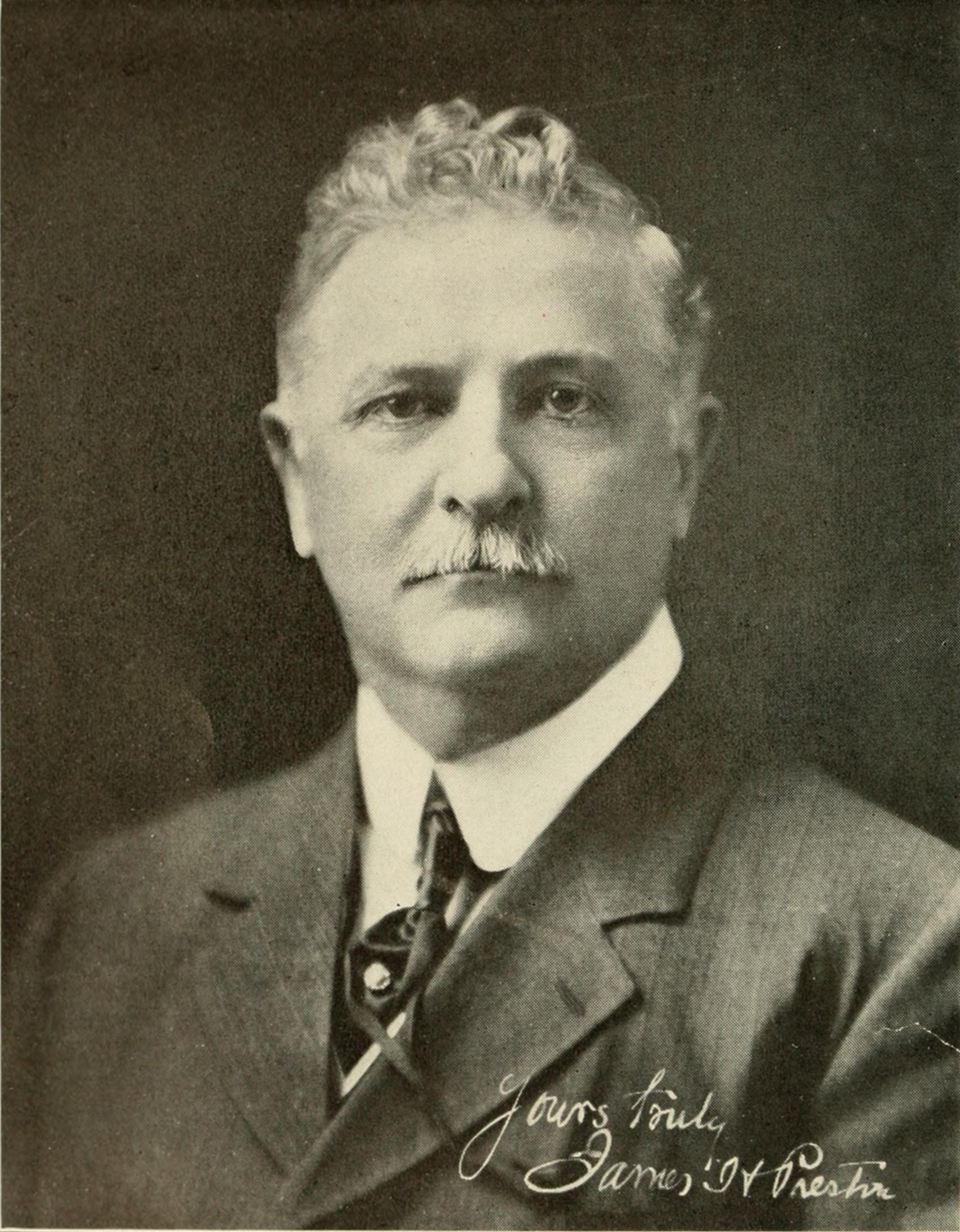

37th Mayor of Baltimore
- In office 1911-1919
- Preceded by: J. Barry Mahool
- Succeeded by: William Frederick Broening

73rd Speaker of the Maryland House of Delegates
- In office 1894

Member of the Maryland House of Delegates
- In office 1890–1894

Personal details
- Born: James Harry Preston; March 23, 1860 Harford County, Maryland, U.S.
- Died: July 14, 1938 (aged 78) Baltimore, Maryland, U.S.
- Resting place: Green Mount Cemetery; Baltimore, Maryland, U.S.
- Party: Democratic
- Spouse: Helen Fiske Jackson (m. 1894)
- Children: 5
- Parent: James B. Preston (father)
- Education: University of Maryland School of Law (LLB)
- Occupation: politician; lawyer; banker

James Harry Preston (March 23, 1860 – July 14, 1938) was the Mayor of Baltimore from 1911 to 1919. He also served in the Maryland House of Delegates. From 1920 to 1921, he served as president general of the National Society of the Sons of the American Revolution.

== Early life ==
James H. Preston was born at Preston's Hill in Harford County, Maryland, on March 23, 1860, to Amelia (née Wilks) and James B. Preston. He attended Bel Air Academy and St. John's College in Annapolis. He graduated from University of Maryland School of Law in 1881 with a Bachelor of Laws.

== Career ==
In 1881, Preston entered the law office of George M. Gill and after Gill's death went into practice with his son, John Gill Jr.

Preston was elected as a Democrat to the Maryland House of Delegates in 1889. He served in that role from 1890 to 1894. He briefly served as Speaker of the Maryland House of Delegates in 1894. He served as a member of the Board of Police Commissioners of Baltimore from 1904 to 1908. Preston was backed by political boss John J. Mahon for nomination for Mayor of Baltimore in 1911. He served as the Mayor of Baltimore from 1911 to 1919. During his tenure as Mayor, the Hanover Street Bridge was built and the Baltimore Symphony Orchestra was founded. A number of civil works projects occurred while he was mayor, including paving and modernizing streets and removal of buildings on St. Paul Street into gardens and parked spaces.

In 1912, he was a delegate to the Democratic National Convention. While there, he received a few votes for the vice presidential nomination. In 1919, he was defeated by George Weems Williams in the primary election for mayor. He was appointed to the Port Development Commission by Mayor Broening. He was later appointed chairman of the Commission by Mayor Jackson. He ran again for mayor in the 1923 election under an independent ticket and lost again. He then chose to withdraw from political life.

Preston served as the 32nd President General of the Sons of the American Revolution. He was the first president and then vice president of Calvert Bank. He was also the president of Jones Falls Improvement Association.

== Personal life ==
Preston married Helen Fiske Jackson, daughter of Wilbur F. Jackson and niece of Elihu Emory Jackson, on November 14, 1894. Together, they had two sons and three daughters: Wilbur, James, Alice, Helen and Mary.

His brother was Walter W. Preston, an associate judge of the third judicial court. He was friends with John Mahon.

His family lived in a mansion on Charles Street in Baltimore built by William Key Howard in 1870. It was later the home of Governor Frank Brown.

== Death ==
Preston died on July 14, 1938, at his home in Baltimore. He is buried at Green Mount Cemetery.

== Legacy ==
In 1917, Preston Gardens were built and named after Preston on St. Paul Street in Baltimore.

Preceded by Murray Vandiver	Speaker of the Maryland House of Delegates; 1894	Succeeded by Sydney Emanuel Mudd I
