= Andrew Boyle =

Andrew Boyle may refer to:

- Andrew Boyle (journalist) (1919–1991), Scottish journalist and biographer
- Andrew Boyle (politician) (c. 1822–1902), American politician from Maryland
- Andrew J. Boyle (1911–2001), officer in the United States Army
- Andrew A. Boyle (1818–1871), member of the Los Angeles Common Council for whom Boyle Heights, Los Angeles was named
- Andy Boyle (born 1991), Irish footballer
