= 1923 Maryland Attorney General election =

- November 6, 1923
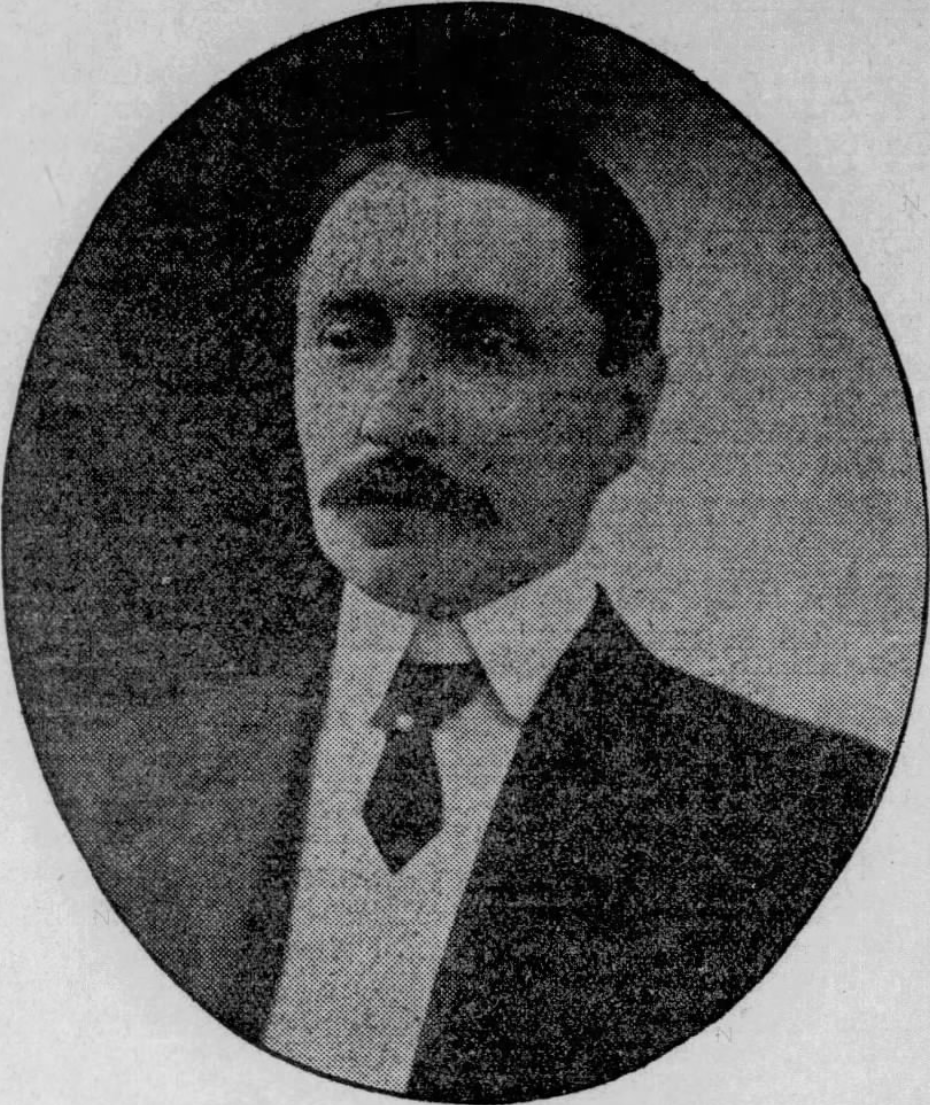

| Nominee | Thomas H. Robinson | William C. Coleman |
| Party | Democratic | Republican |
| Popular vote | 167,335 | 120,987 |
| Percentage | 57.21% | 41.36% |
- County results Robinson: 40–50% 50–60% 60–70% Coleman: 40–50% 50–60% 60–70%
Attorney General before election
Alexander Armstrong
Republican
Elected Attorney General
Thomas H. Robinson
Democratic

The 1923 Maryland attorney general election was held on November 6, 1923, in order to elect the attorney general of Maryland. Democratic nominee and former member of the Maryland Senate Thomas H. Robinson defeated Republican nominee William C. Coleman, Socialist nominee William A. Toole and Labor nominee Louis F. Guillotte.

== General election ==
On election day, November 6, 1923, Democratic nominee Thomas H. Robinson won the election by a margin of 46,348 votes against his foremost opponent Republican nominee William C. Coleman, thereby gaining Democratic control over the office of attorney general. Robinson was sworn in as the 30th attorney general of Maryland on January 3, 1924.

=== Results ===
Maryland Attorney General election, 1923
| Party | Candidate | Votes | % |
|---|---|---|---|
| Democratic | Thomas H. Robinson | 167,335 | 57.21 |
| Republican | William C. Coleman | 120,987 | 41.36 |
| Socialist | William A. Toole | 2,341 | 0.80 |
| Labor | Louis F. Guillotte | 1,847 | 0.63 |
| Total votes | | 292,510 | 100.00 |
| Democratic gain from Republican | | | |
