= William Grason Scott =

American politician (died 1882)

Member of the Maryland House of Delegates from the Harford County district
- In office 1878–1880 Serving with Silas Scarboro, Murray Vandiver, James B. Preston

Personal details
- Died: April 5, 1882 (aged 35) Baltimore, Maryland, U.S.
- Resting place: St. Ignatius Cemetery
- Party: Democratic
- Parent: Otho Scott (father)
- Relatives: William Grason (grandfather); Richard Grason (uncle)
- Education: Mount St. Mary's University

William Grason Scott (died April 5, 1882) was an American politician from Maryland. He served as a member of the Maryland House of Delegates, representing Harford County from 1878 to 1880.

== Early life ==
William Grason Scott was born to Otho Scott. His father was one of the first lawyers in Maryland. He was the grandson of Maryland governor William Grason and nephew of judge Richard Grason. He attended Mount St. Mary's University and finished his studies in Germany and France. He studied law under Henry D. Farnandis.

== Career ==
Scott was a Democrat. He served as a member of the Maryland House of Delegates, representing Harford County from 1878 to 1880.

== Personal life ==
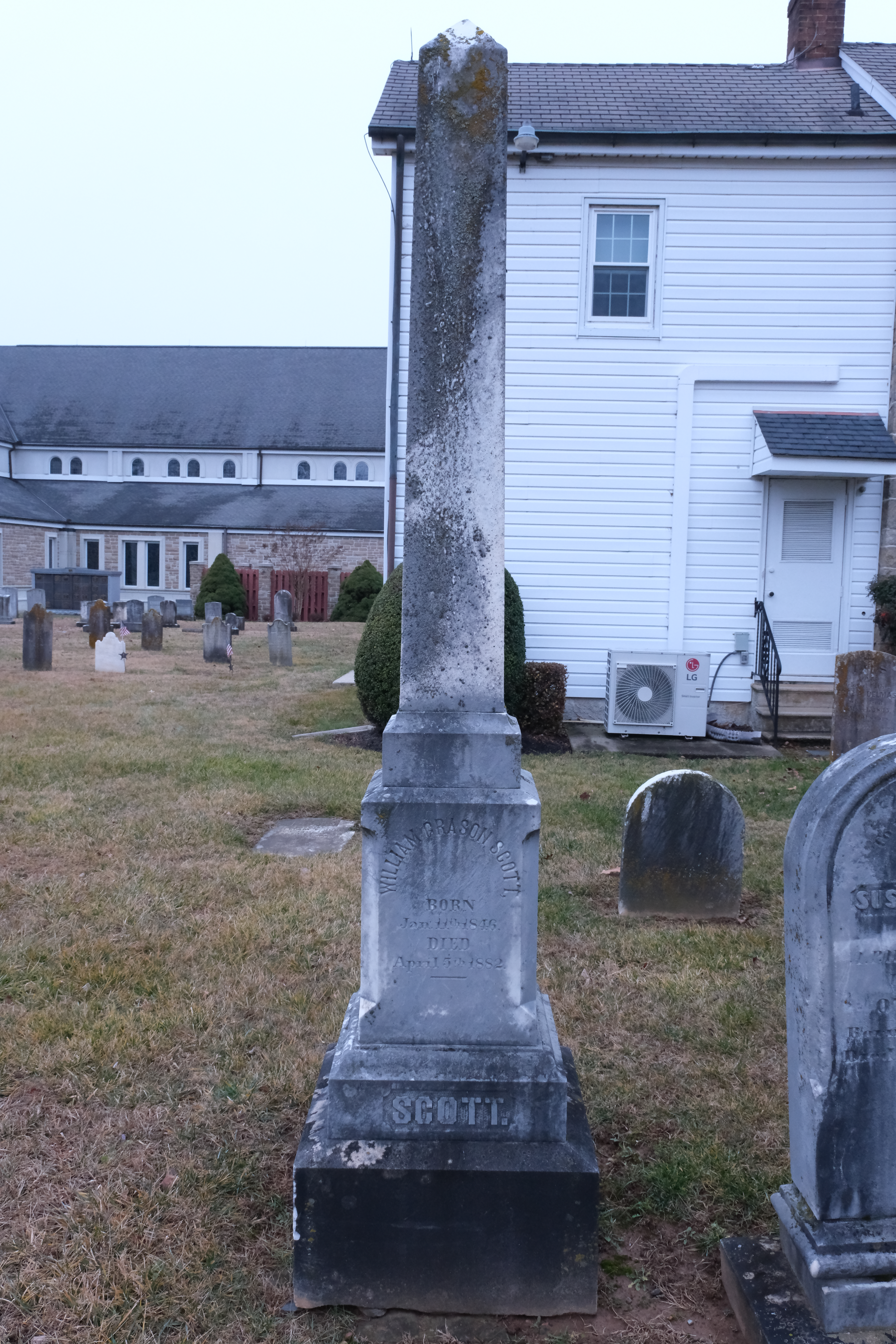
Grave of Scott at St. Ignatius Cemetery

Scott was a member of St. Ignatius Catholic Church.

Scott died from scarlet fever on April 5, 1882, at the age of 35, at Guy's Hotel in Baltimore. He was buried at St. Ignatius Cemetery.
