= John H. Baker (Maryland politician) =

American politician and preacher (1823–1894)

Member of the Maryland House of Delegates from the Harford County district
- In office 1858–1858 Serving with Thomas M. Bacon and Franklin Hanway

Personal details
- Born: John Hanson Baker; 1823 Aberdeen, Maryland, U.S.
- Died: December 8, 1894 (aged 71) Baltimore, Maryland, U.S.
- Resting place: Baker Cemetery; Aberdeen, Maryland, U.S.
- Spouse(s): Miss Ruff; Cornelia Elizabeth Stockham
- Children: 3, including Thomas Stockham
- Relatives: William Benjamin Baker (nephew)
- Occupation: Politician; preacher

John Hanson Baker (1823 – December 8, 1894) was an American politician and preacher from Maryland. He served as a member of the Maryland House of Delegates, representing Harford County in 1858.

== Early life ==
John Hanson Baker was born in 1823 in Aberdeen, Maryland.

== Career ==
Baker served as a member of the Maryland House of Delegates, representing Harford County in 1858.

Baker moved to Baltimore around 1874. He was appointed to a position in the Baltimore customs house. He was a preacher at a Methodist Episcopal Church.

== Personal life ==
Baker married Miss Ruff. Baker later married Cornelia Elizabeth Stockham. He had three sons, W. R., Thomas Stockham and S. V. His son Thomas Stockham was the president of Carnegie Mellon University. His nephew was congressman William Benjamin Baker.

Baker died on December 8, 1894, at the age of 71, at his home at 1202 Mount Royal Avenue in Baltimore. He was buried at Baker Cemetery in Aberdeen.
