= Frank E. Baker (politician) =

American politician (died 1957)

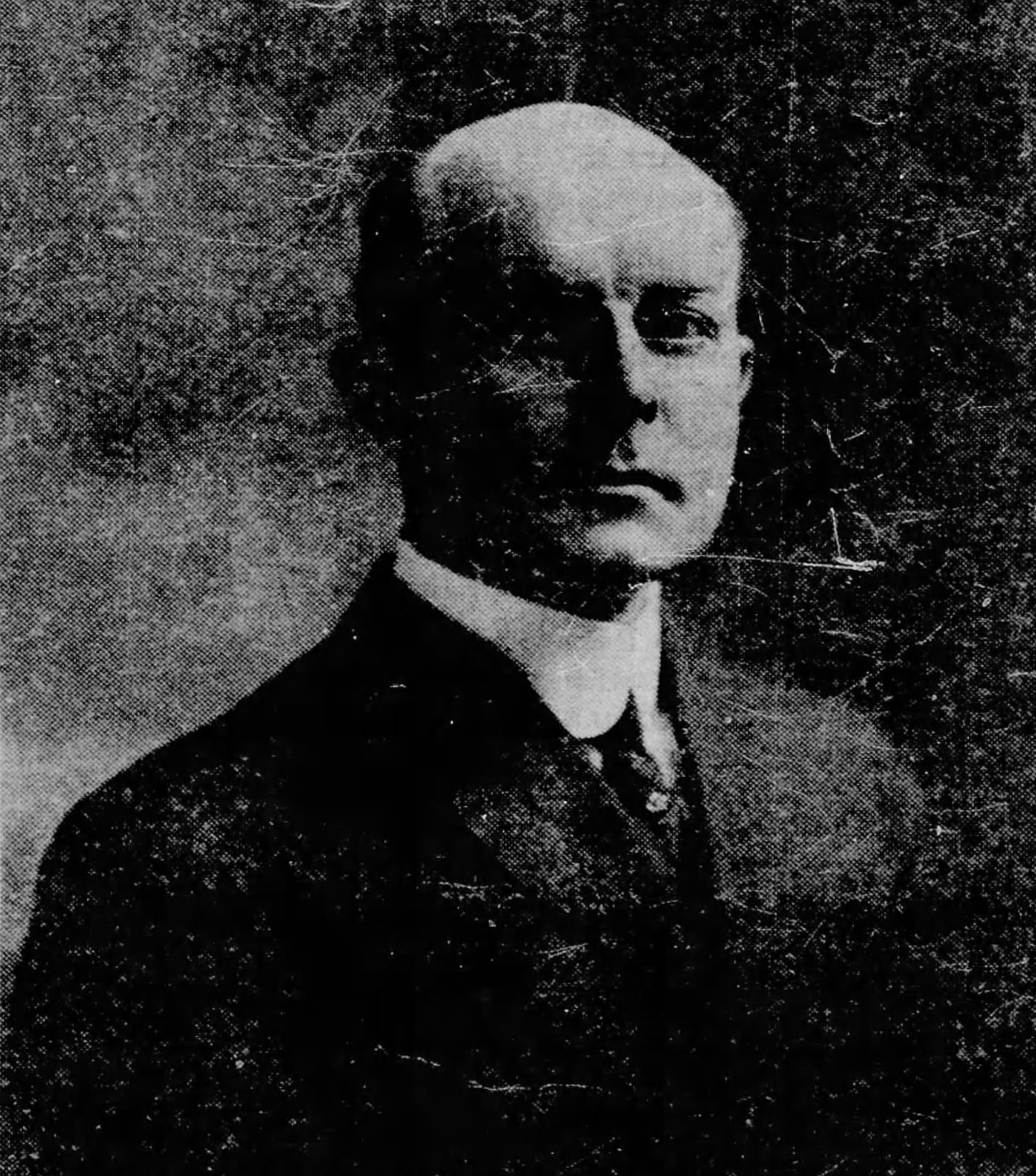
- Baker (c. 1921)

President of the Board of Commissioners of Aberdeen, Maryland
- In office 1916–1950
- Preceded by: C. H. Johnson
- Succeeded by: J. Wilmer Cronin

Member of the Maryland House of Delegates from the Harford County district
- In office 1916–1917 Serving with Millard E. Tydings and Thomas H. Ward

Personal details
- Born: Frank Emerson Baker Aberdeen, Maryland, U.S.
- Died: July 12, 1957 (aged 79)
- Resting place: Baker Cemetery; Aberdeen, Maryland, U.S.
- Party: Republican
- Spouse(s): Edith Claire Kimmell (m. 1905; died 1907) Edythe A. Rogers (m. 1917)
- Children: 3
- Relatives: William Benjamin Baker (uncle)
- Occupation: Politician; broker

Frank Emerson Baker (died July 12, 1957) was an American politician from Maryland. He served as a member of the Maryland House of Delegates, representing Harford County's district from 1916 to 1917. He served as president of the board of commissioners of Aberdeen, Maryland, from 1916 to 1950.

== Early life ==
Frank Emerson Baker was born in Aberdeen, Maryland, to Emma Michael and Charles W. Baker. He was the nephew of William Benjamin Baker, state delegate, state senator and U.S. Representative.

== Career ==
Baker was a Republican. Baker served as a member of the Maryland House of Delegates, representing Harford County, from 1916 to 1917. He ran for the Maryland Senate in 1917, but lost to J. Royston Stifler. He ran for Maryland Senate again in 1921.

Baker served as the president of the board of commissioners of Aberdeen from 1916 to 1950. He also served as chairman of the Republican State General Committee in Harford County and was a member of the Harford County Board of Elections.

After retiring from the board of commissioners, Baker worked for C. W. Baker & Sons, the brokerage firm started by his father.

Baker became a member of the board of directors of the First National Bank of Aberdeen in 1922. He was a director of the Philadelphia Electric Company and served as president of the Aberdeen Fire Department.

== Personal life ==
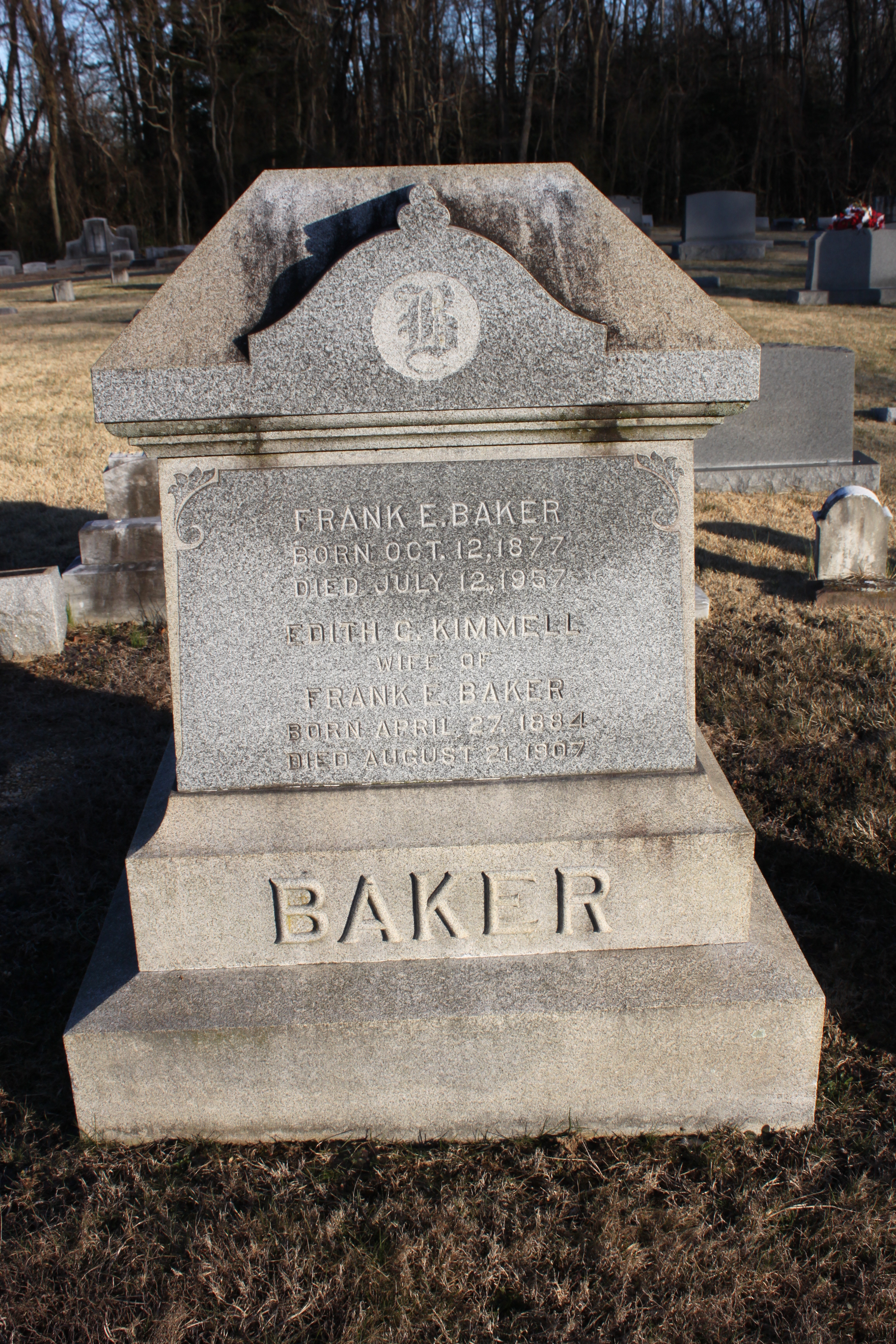
Grave of Baker at Baker Cemetery

Baker married twice. Baker married Edith Claire Kimmell on October 31, 1905. They had one son. His wife died in 1907 Baker married Edythe A. Rogers of Portland, Oregon, on October 11, 1917. He had one son and two daughters, Emerson, Mrs. William Bechtol and Margaret Grace.

Baker was a member of the Methodist Episcopal Church in Aberdeen. Baker died on July 12, 1957, at the age of 79. He was buried at Baker Cemetery.
