= Thomas Baker (college president) =

American college president (1871–1939)

President of Carnegie Mellon University
- In office 1922 – September 17, 1935
- Preceded by: Arthur Hamerschlag
- Succeeded by: Robert E. Doherty

Personal details
- Born: Thomas Stockham Baker; March 28, 1871 Aberdeen, Maryland, U.S.
- Died: April 7, 1939 (aged 68) Pittsburgh, Pennsylvania, U.S.
- Parent: John H. Baker (father)
- Occupation: Educator

Academic background
- Education: Johns Hopkins University (A.B., PhD); University of Leipzig
- Thesis: America as the Poetical Utopia of Lenau and the Politico-Literary Ideal of Kürnberger and Young Germany (1895)

Thomas Stockham Baker (March 28, 1871 – April 7, 1939) was an American scholar and educator who served as the second President of Carnegie Mellon University in Pittsburgh, Pennsylvania, United States.

== Early life ==
Thomas Stockham Baker was born in Aberdeen, Maryland on March 28, 1871, to Cornelia E. (née Stockham) and John H. Baker. He attended public schools in Baltimore County. He studied at Johns Hopkins University, graduating in 1891 with a Bachelor of Arts. He did graduate work at the University of Leipzig in Germany, then returned to Baltimore to complete his Ph.D. at Johns Hopkins in 1895. His thesis was titled America as the Poetical Utopia of Lenau and the Politico-Literary Ideal of Kürnberger and Young Germany.

== Career ==
He became a police reporter for the Baltimore News and then a music critic for the Baltimore Sun. In 1895, he became an associate professor of German at Johns Hopkins. From 1900 to 1908, he taught German language and literature at Johns Hopkins. He joined the faculty of the Jacob Tome Institute, a prep school for boys in Port Deposit, Maryland, as a teacher of German in 1900. He became the director of the Institute in 1909. He remained at the Tome Institute until 1919.

He moved to Pittsburgh, Pennsylvania in 1919 to become secretary at Carnegie Institute of Technology (later Carnegie Mellon University). When Tech's first president, Arthur Hamerschlag, resigned in 1922, Baker became the second president.

=== Carnegie Tech years ===
Baker's administration worked to lift Tech out of its "construction phase" under President Hamerschlag, focusing on deepening the school's academic offerings, research, and beautifying the campus. His leadership saw the introduction of the Carnegie Library School (later named the Graduate School of Library and Information Sciences), increased evening student enrollment, the Coal Research Laboratory, and the Metals Research Laboratory. Football was prominent during the Baker years, with Tech defeating the University of Pittsburgh and the University of Notre Dame on many occasions, and falling short of the national championship in 1928 by just one game. Baker resigned from Carnegie Tech on September 17, 1935, and was appointed president emeritus and to the board.

Baker gained a reputation at Carnegie Mellon as an expert on coal production and research. In 1926, 1928, and 1931, he held international conferences on coal production in Pittsburgh.

=== Other accomplishments ===
In 1934, Baker served as vice president of the American Association for the Advancement of Science. He also served as a member of the water resources committee of the U.S. Chamber of Commerce. Baker Hall, home of the Dietrich College of Humanities and Social Sciences is named after Thomas Baker.

He was given a LL.D. honorary degree from the University of Delaware, a Sc.D. honorary degree from Duquesne University and a Sc.D. honorary degree from Lafayette College.

== Personal life ==
Baker was a bachelor and never married.

== Death and legacy ==
Baker died on April 7, 1939, at Presbyterian Hospital in Pittsburgh.

Academic offices
Preceded by Arthur Hamerschlag	Carnegie Mellon University President; 1922 – 1935	Succeeded by Robert E. Doherty
