= Arthur Hamerschlag =

American engineer

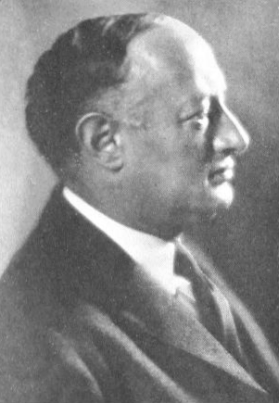

President of Carnegie Mellon University
- In office 1903–1922

Personal details
- Born: Arthur Arton Hamerschlag; November 22, 1872 Nebraska, US
- Died: July 20, 1927 (aged 54) New York, New York, US
- Resting place: Homewood Cemetery
- Spouse: Elizabeth Ann Tollast (m. 1901)
- Children: 1
- Occupation: Electrical and mechanical engineer

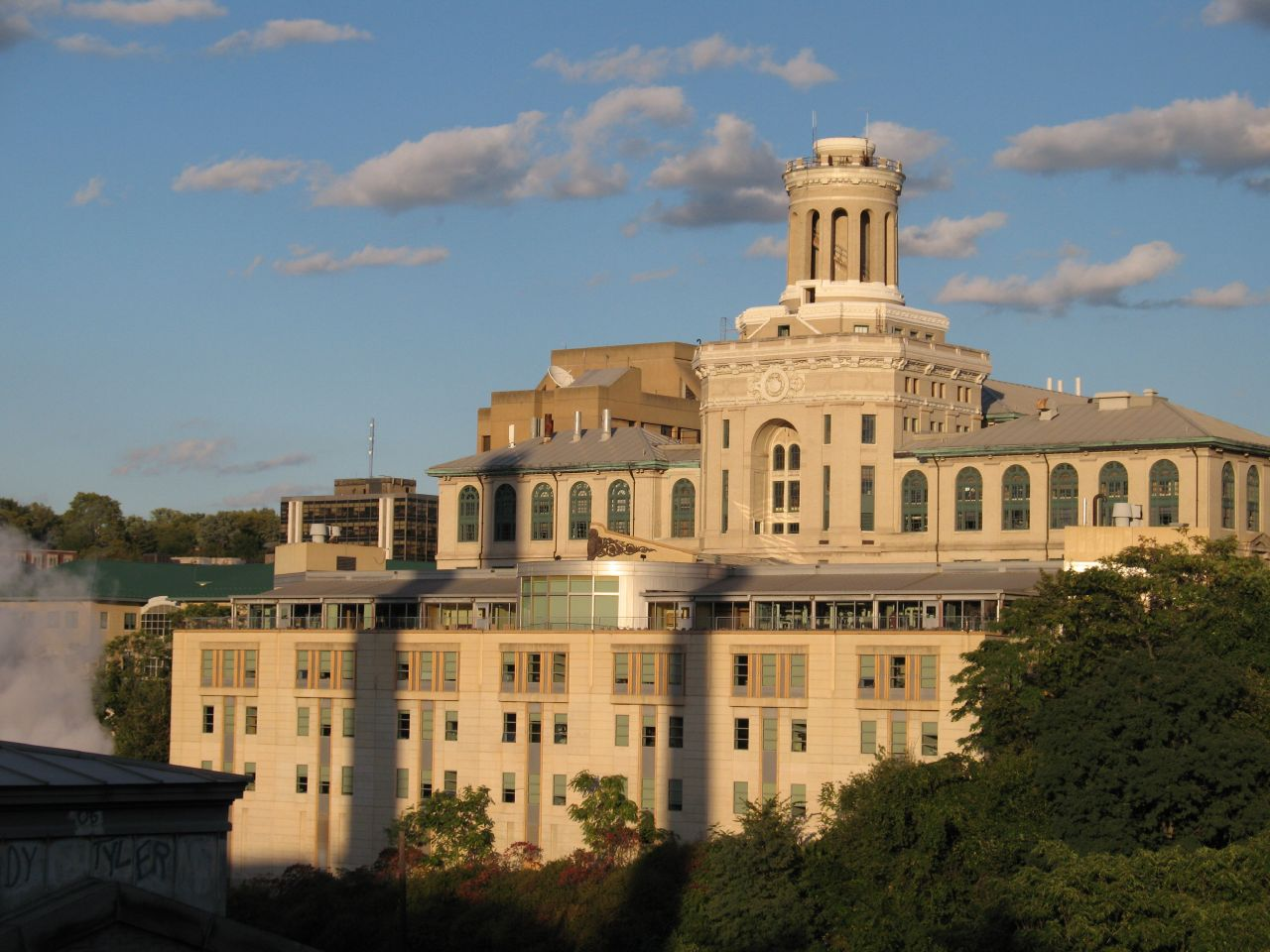
Hamerschlag Hall, named for Carnegie Mellon's first president

Arthur Arton Hamerschlag (November 22, 1872 – July 20, 1927) was an American electrical and mechanical engineer who served as the first President of Carnegie Mellon University in Pittsburgh, Pennsylvania, United States.

== Early life ==
Arthur Hamerschlag was born in Nebraska on November 22, 1872, to Jewish immigrants from the Austro-Hungarian Empire. He graduated from the Hebrew Technical Institute in 1889 with a specialization in electricity, and did field work working on electric plants in Cuba, Mexico, and throughout the U.S. Back in New York City he worked for both St. George's Trade School and the New York Trade School. His reputation there brought him to the attention of Andrew Carnegie, who was looking for leadership for his new educational venture in Pittsburgh.

== Carnegie Tech years ==
Carnegie and William H. Frew, chairman of the Board of Trustees of The Carnegie Institute and Carnegie's lawyer in Pittsburgh, hired Hamerschlag in 1903 as the first director of the fledgling Carnegie Technical Schools, as the project was first called. Its aim was not to compete with the nearby University of Pittsburgh, but to provide practical vocational training in the industrial trades and to offer 3-year diplomas, not bachelor's degrees. And so the building of the campus began, and the hiring of faculty, and the school was launched.

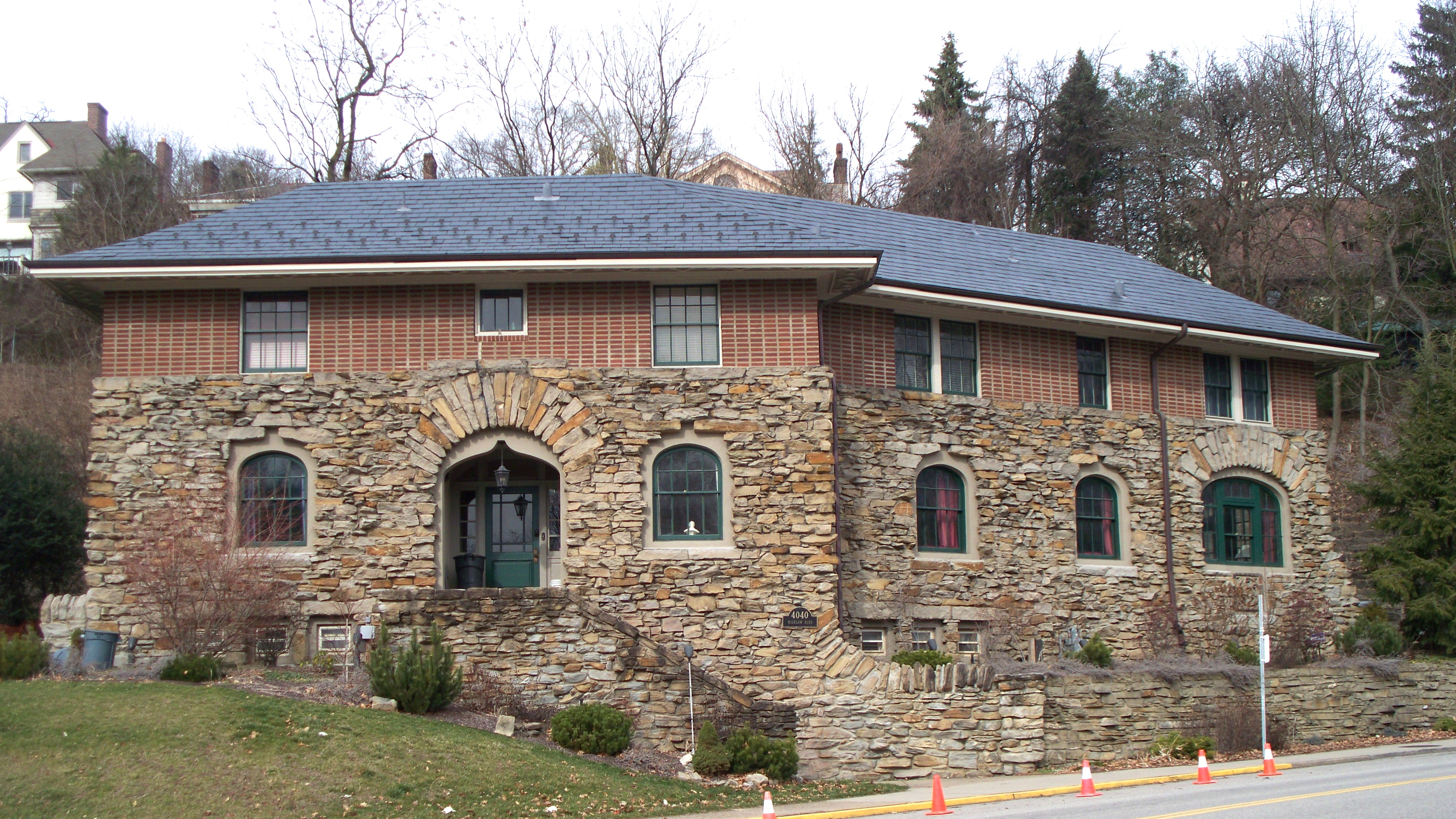
Ledge House, Pittsburgh home of A. A. Hamerschlag, designed for him by Henry Hornbostel

Hamerschlag built the campus in partnership with Carnegie himself and the architect Henry Hornbostel. While the campus grew, the school found it difficult to compete. Industrial unions had their own apprenticeship programs, and it was challenging to attract and retain faculty, most of whom preferred to work for degree-granting institutions. So in 1912, the Carnegie Technical Schools were renamed Carnegie Institute of Technology. Hamerschlag then led the development of bachelor's and master's degree programs, and the college took off.

When Andrew Carnegie died in 1919, the funding of the college, which had come from Carnegie himself, came under scrutiny by the estate, now controlled by the Carnegie Corporation of New York. It commissioned a survey in 1921 and the report recommended that the college broaden its sources of funds for the future. Hamerschlag, who did not have a seat on the board, felt excluded from the decision and the new direction being charted. He resigned in 1922.

He returned to New York and reestablished an engineering practice.

== Personal life ==
Hamerschlag married Elizabeth Ann Tollast on December 22, 1901, and they had one son.

Hamerschlag died at Roosevelt Hospital in Manhattan on July 20, 1927. He was buried at Homewood Cemetery in Pittsburgh.

At Carnegie Mellon, Hamerschlag's name is still honored through Hamerschlag Hall, the home of the Department of Electrical and Computer Engineering, as well as Hamerschlag House, a freshman dorm which was all-male since its founding in the 1960s but was made co-ed in 2018.

== Bibliography ==
- Fenton, Edwin (2000). Carnegie Mellon 1900-2000: A Centennial History. Pittsburgh: Carnegie Mellon University Press. ISBN 0-88748-323-2.

Academic offices
New office	Carnegie Mellon University President; 1903–1922	Succeeded by Thomas Baker
