= Thomas B. Hayward (politician) =

American politician and physician (1838–1919)

Member of the Maryland House of Delegates from the Harford County district
- In office 1892–1896 Serving with Samuel S. Bevard, John O. Stearns, Murray Vandiver, Harold Scarboro

Personal details
- Born: Thomas Baxter Hayward; May 4, 1838 Rossville, Pennsylvania, U.S.
- Died: December 9, 1919 (aged 81) Baltimore, Maryland, U.S.
- Resting place: St. Mary's Cemetery; Baltimore, Maryland, U.S.
- Party: Democratic
- Spouse: Helen M. Bussey
- Children: 10
- Education: Dickinson College; Jefferson Medical College
- Occupation: Politician; physician

Thomas Baxter Hayward (May 4, 1838 – December 9, 1919) was an American politician and physician. He served as a member of the Maryland House of Delegates, representing Harford County, from 1892 to 1896.

== Early life ==
Thomas Baxter Hayward was born on May 4, 1838, in Rossville, Pennsylvania, to Sarah (née Briarly) and Joseph J. Hayward. His father was a physician who practiced in York County. Hayward attended Cumberland Institute and graduated from Dickinson College. For three years, he read medicine under Dr. James W. Kerr of York. In 1859, he graduated with a medical degree from Jefferson Medical College in Philadelphia.

== Career ==
Hayward had a medical practice in York, Pennsylvania. After health problems, he moved to Harford County, Maryland.

Hayward was a Democrat. He was a candidate for the Maryland House of Delegates in 1889, but lost to Noble L. Mitchell. Hayward served as a member of the Maryland House of Delegates, representing Harford County, from 1892 to 1896.

Hayward was president of the Cleveland Tariff Reform Club, a political organization.

== Personal life ==
In the 1860s, Hayward moved to Clermont Mills. He married Helen M. Bussey of Harford County. They had ten children, including Ferdinand, Francis Sidney, Augustus, Stilley, Eugene H., Helen, Florence and Mrs. A. Maynard Bacon. His son Francis Sidney was a customs officer and deputy collector for the Port of Baltimore. His son Eugene H. was a surgeon in World War I and at the University of Maryland. Later in life, his family moved to Baltimore.

Hayward died on December 9, 1919, at the home of his son in Baltimore. He was buried at St. Mary's Cemetery in Govans, Baltimore.
