= David Wiley (Maryland politician) =

American politician (died 1885)

David W. Wiley

Member of the Maryland House of Delegates from the Harford County district
- In office 1882–1882 Serving with William Benjamin Baker, James B. Preston, Silas Scarboro

Personal details
- Died: October 24, 1885 (aged 69) Norrisville, Maryland, U.S.
- Resting place: Norrisville, Maryland, U.S.
- Party: Democratic
- Children: 5
- Occupation: Politician; farmer

David W. Wiley (died October 24, 1885) was an American politician from Maryland. He served as a member of the Maryland House of Delegates, representing Harford County in 1882.

== Career ==
David W. Wiley was a Democrat. He served as a member of the Maryland House of Delegates, representing Harford County in 1882. He ran for the Democratic nomination in the 1885 election for the Maryland House of Delegates.

Wiley was a farmer and cattle dealer.

== Personal life ==
Wiley was married. He had four sons and one daughter, George, Nelson, William, Thomas and Mrs. John Free. He was a member of the Methodist Episcopal Church of Norrisville. He owned property in Norrisville, Maryland.

Wiley had a stroke in March 1885. Wiley died of typhoid fever on October 24, 1885, at the age of 69, at his home in Norrisville. He was buried in Norrisville.
