= Thomas M. Bacon =

American politician (1803–1874)

Member of the Maryland House of Delegates from the Harford County district
- In office 1858–1858 Serving with John H. Baker and Franklin Hanway

Personal details
- Born: July 1803
- Died: March 6, 1874 (aged 70) Oxford, New York, U.S.
- Party: Know Nothing
- Occupation: Politician; educator

Thomas M. Bacon (July 1803 – March 6, 1874) was an American politician from Maryland. He served as a member of the Maryland House of Delegates, representing Harford County in 1858.

== Early life ==
Thomas M. Bacon was born in July 1803.

== Career ==
Bacon was appointed as the notary public of Havre de Grace in 1852 and 1854.

Bacon ran as a Know Nothing (known then as American Party). Bacon served as a member of the Maryland House of Delegates, representing Harford County in 1858.

Bacon also worked as principal of an academy and justice of the peace.

== Personal life ==
Bacon married, but his wife predeceased him. Bacon lived in Havre de Grace and moved to Oxford, New York, around 1871.

Bacon died on March 6, 1874, in Oxford.
