= Angel Hill Cemetery =

Cemetery in Harford County, Maryland

- Interactive map of Angel Hill Cemetery

Details
- Established: May 4, 1886
- Location: Havre de Grace, Maryland
- Country: United States
- Coordinates: 39°33′20″N 76°06′11″W

Angel Hill Cemetery is a cemetery in Havre de Grace, Maryland.

== History ==
Angel Hill Cemetery was incorporated on May 4, 1886. Later in 1886, an iron fence was built surrounding the cemetery.

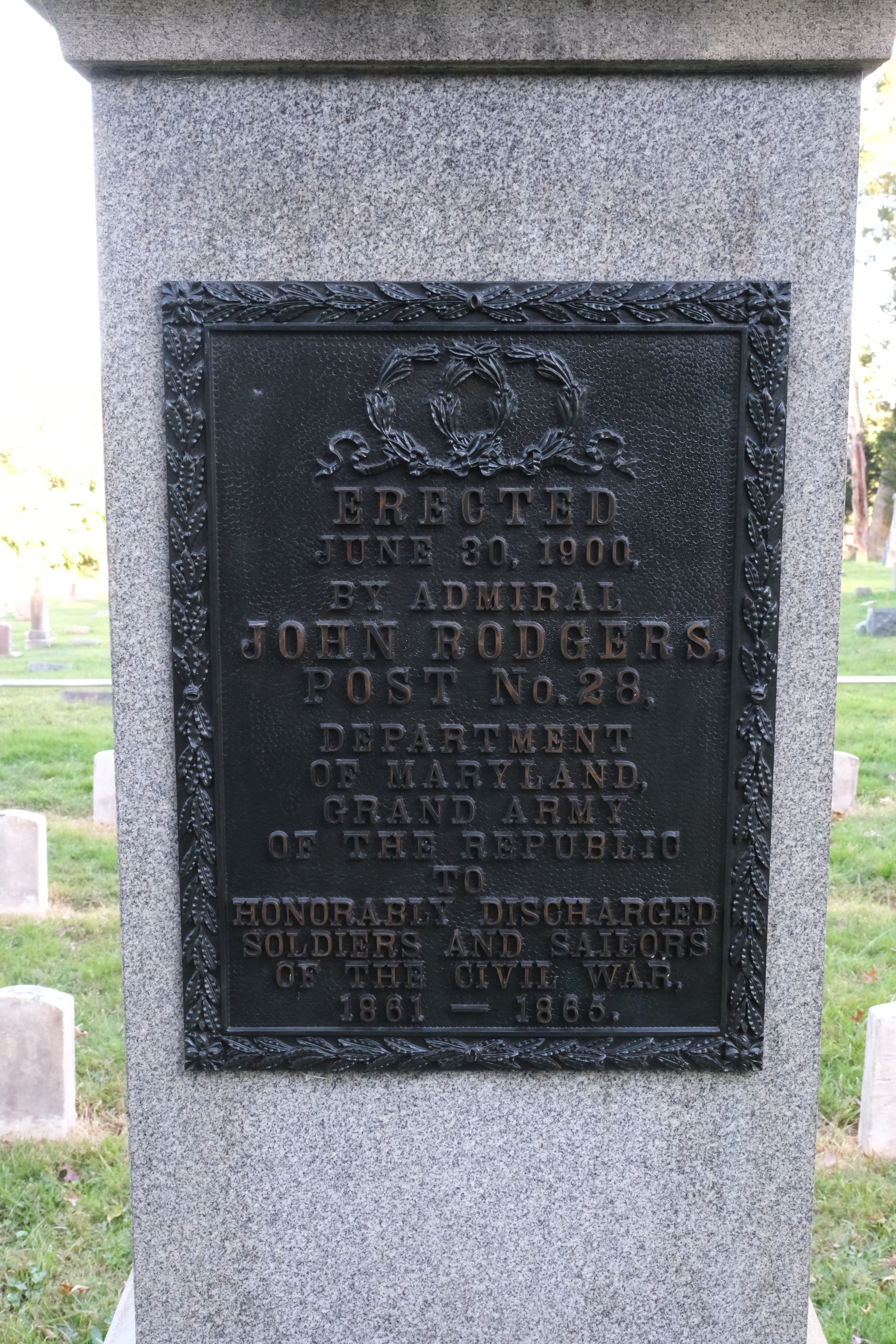
Admiral John Rodgers Post, No. 28 Civil War Memorial plaque

On July 4, 1900, a ten-foot granite monument was dedicated to the "honorably discharged Soldiers and Sailors of the Civil War 1861–1865". It was donated by the Admiral John Rodgers Post, No. 28, Department of Maryland Grand Army of the Republic.

In 2014, portions of the third season of the television series House of Cards were filmed in and around Angel Hill Cemetery.

== Notable interments ==
- C. B. Burns (1879–1968), baseball player
- Frederick Lee Cobourn (1885–1962), politician and judge
- John Donahoo (1786–1858), lighthouse builder and town commissioner
- James W. Foster (died 1932), politician
- Harry C. Lawder (1844–1921), politician and merchant
- Robert R. Lawder (died 1967), state politician and mayor of Havre de Grace
- John O'Neill (1768–1838), lighthouse keeper and defender of Havre de Grace in War of 1812
- G. Arnold Pfaffenbach (1904–1982), Maryland state delegate and lawyer
- Robert Seneca (died 1931), state delegate and mayor of Havre de Grace
- Stone family, victims of murderer Hattie Stone
- Millard Tydings (1890–1961), U.S. Senator and U.S. Representative
- Murray Vandiver (1845–1916), Maryland state delegate, Treasurer of Maryland and mayor of Havre de Grace
- Robert R. Vandiver (1805–1885), Maryland state delegate and contractor

== See also ==
- List of cemeteries in Maryland
