= John O. Stearns =

American politician (died 1910)

Member of the Maryland House of Delegates from the Harford County district
- In office 1892–1896 Serving with Samuel S. Bevard, Thomas B. Hayward, Murray Vandiver, Harold Scarboro

Personal details
- Born: Baltimore, Maryland, U.S.
- Died: May 26, 1910 (aged 72) near Whiteford, Maryland, U.S.
- Resting place: Slate Ridge Cemetery
- Party: Democratic
- Children: 2
- Occupation: Politician; farmer

John O. Stearns (died May 26, 1910) was a politician from Maryland. He served as a member of the Maryland House of Delegates, representing Harford County, from 1892 to 1896.

== Early life ==
John O. Stearns was born in Baltimore, Maryland. At the age of nine, he moved to Harford County.

== Career ==
Stearns was a Democrat who, in 1875, ran for the Democratic nomination of Harford County sheriff, but lost to G. William Hanway.

Stearns was appointed as justice of the peace of the 5th district by Governor John Lee Carroll following the resignation of Cyrus H. Pusey in 1879. He was appointed again in 1882. He served in that role until his death, when he was succeeded by Howard Proctor. He also served on the board of managers of the Maryland House of Corrections.

Stearns served as a member of the Maryland House of Delegates, representing Harford County, from 1892 to 1896. He was a member of the committee on temperance and served as chairman of the committee on claims.

He also farmed in the Dublin district of Harford County.

== Personal life ==
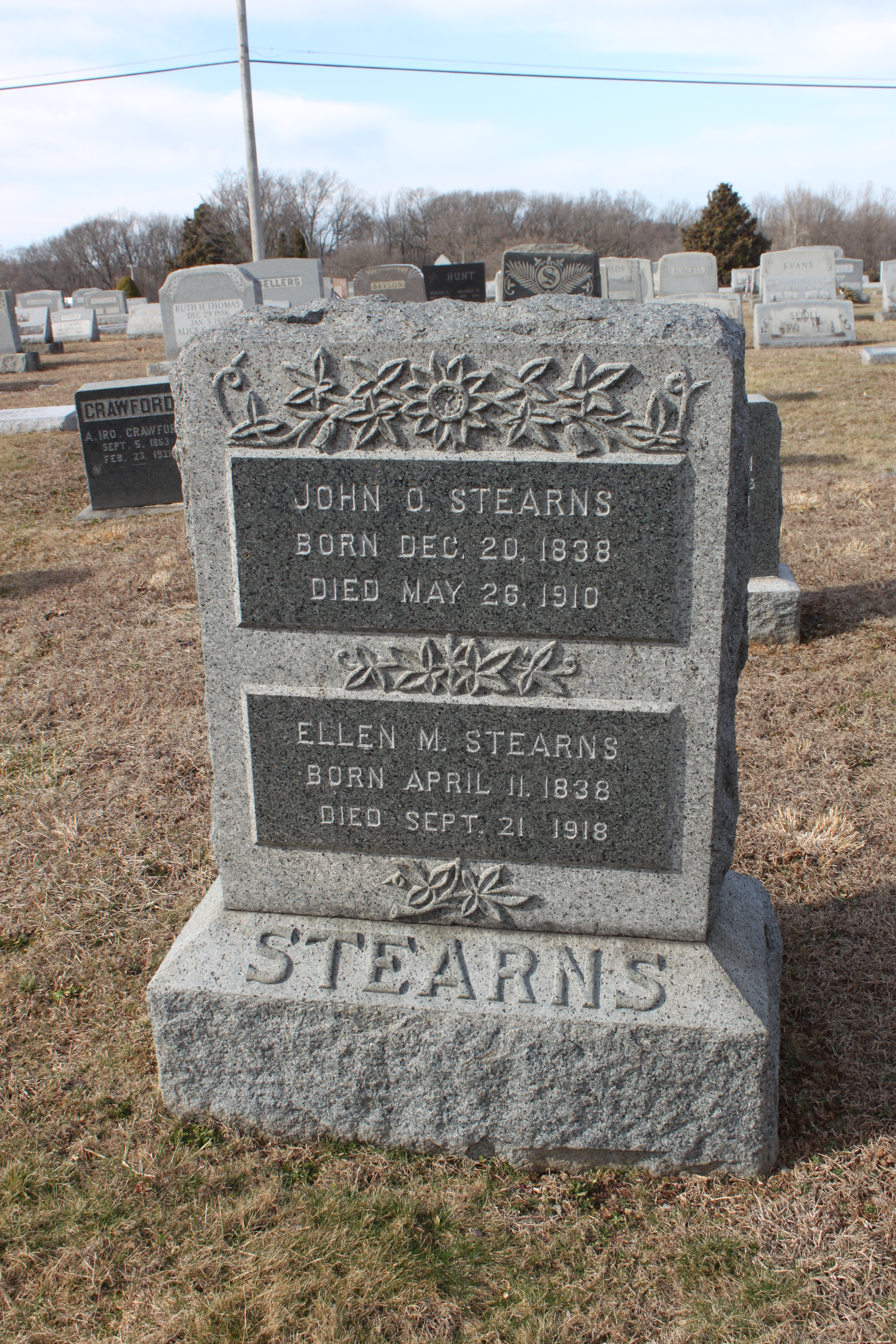
Grave of Stearns at Slate Ridge Cemetery

Stearns was married. They had two sons, William and John.

Stearns died on May 26, 1910, at the age of 72, at his home near Whiteford, Maryland. He was buried at Slate Ridge Cemetery.
