= Thomas H. Ward =

American politician (1867–1951)

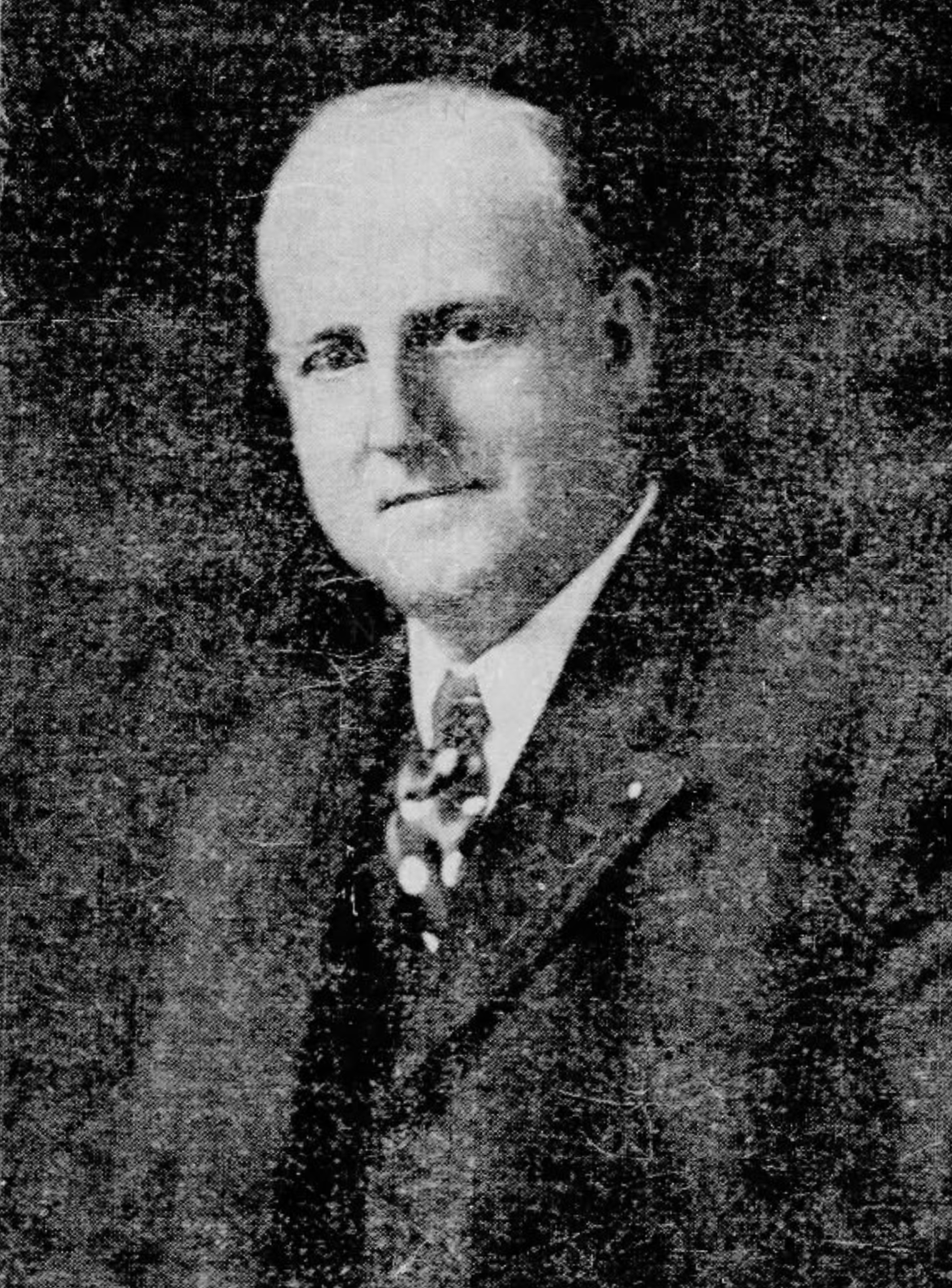
- Ward (c. 1921)

Member of the Maryland House of Delegates from the Harford County district
- In office 1916–1917 Serving with Frank E. Baker and Millard Tydings

Personal details
- Born: July 6, 1867 Catonsville, Maryland, U.S.
- Died: July 23, 1951 (aged 84) Baltimore, Maryland, U.S.
- Resting place: Bethel Cemetery; Madonna, Maryland, U.S.
- Party: Prohibition (1893–1895); Republican (1911–1921)
- Spouse: Julia E. Jarrett (m. 1895; died 1933)
- Children: 3
- Occupation: Politician; postmaster; merchant; college president

Thomas H. Ward (July 6, 1867 – July 23, 1951) was an American politician from Maryland. He served as a member of the Maryland House of Delegates, representing Harford County from 1916 to 1917.

== Early life ==
Thomas Harry (or Henry) Ward was born on July 6, 1867, in Catonsville, Maryland, to Elizabeth (née Mellor) and John Thomas Ward. He attended schools in Baltimore County. His brother A. Norman Ward would serve as president of Western Maryland College.

== Career ==
Ward was appointed postmaster in Jarrettsville, Maryland, in April 1896. Ward worked as vice postmaster in Jarrettsville, until he resigned in January 1898.

Ward ran on a Prohibition Party ticket in the 1893 and 1895 election for the Maryland House of Delegates.

Ward served as president of Baltimore Business College from 1900 to 1904. He worked in the firm Jarrett Brothers & Ward of Jarrettsville. He worked as a merchant.

Ward ran for Maryland House of Delegates on Republican tickets in 1911 and 1913. Ward ran again in 1915 and defeated Thomas C. Hopkins by a margin of 10 votes. Hopkins contested the election, but was unsuccessful in his case. He served as a member of the Maryland House of Delegates, representing Harford County from 1916 to 1917. In 1917, Ward was defeated for re-election to the Maryland House of Delegates.

In 1921, Ward was defeated in election for clerk of the circuit court.

== Personal life ==
Ward married Julia E. Jarrett, daughter of sheriff Thomas Bond Jarrett, on August 28, 1895. They had two sons and one daughter, John T., Jarrett M. and Katherine E. His wife died in 1933. His son John T. was a correspondent during the Korean War for The Baltimore Sun. Ward was a member of the Methodist Episcopal Church in Jarrettsville.

Ward died on July 23, 1951, at Union Memorial Hospital in Baltimore, following a heart attack a week prior. He was buried at Bethel Cemetery in Madonna, Maryland.
