= Charles W. Michael =

American politician (died 1915)

Member of the Maryland Senate
- In office 1896
- Preceded by: William Benjamin Baker
- Succeeded by: Stevenson A. Williams
- Constituency: Harford County

Personal details
- Died: January 23, 1915 (aged 64) Perryman, Maryland, U.S.
- Resting place: Spesutia Protestant Episcopal Church
- Party: Democratic
- Occupation: Politician

Charles W. Michael (died January 23, 1915) was a politician from Maryland. He served in the Maryland Senate in 1896.

== Early life ==
Charles W. Michael was born to Jackson Michael.

== Career ==
Michael was a Democrat. Michael served in the Maryland Senate, representing Harford County, in 1896. He succeeded William Benjamin Baker who resigned.

== Personal life ==
Michael did not marry.

Michael died on January 23, 1915, at his "Buttonwood" home in Perryman, Maryland, at the age of 64. He was buried at Spesutia Protestant Episcopal Church.
