= Harold Scarboro =

American politician and newspaper editor (1861–1944)

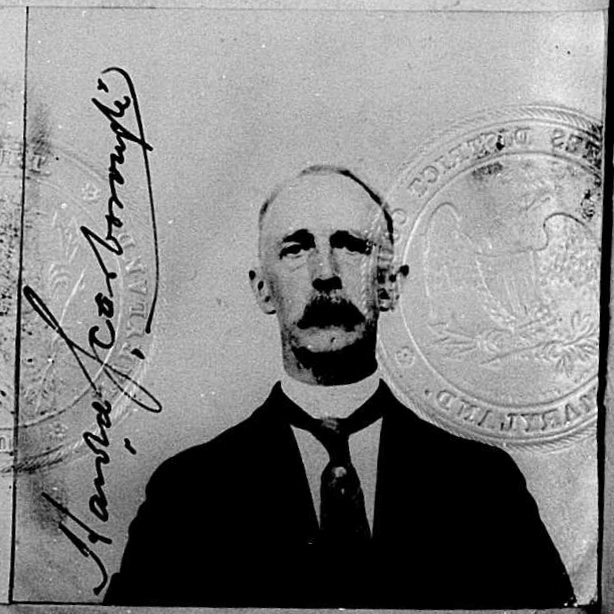
- Passport photo (1923)

Member of the Maryland House of Delegates from the Harford County district
- In office 1894–1896 Serving with Samuel S. Bevard, Thomas B. Hayward, John O. Stearns

Personal details
- Born: November 4, 1861 Harford County, Maryland
- Died: February 21, 1944 (aged 82) Baltimore, Maryland, U.S.
- Party: Democratic
- Parent: Silas Scarboro (father)
- Occupation: Politician; newspaper editor

Harold Scarboro (November 4, 1861 – February 21, 1944) was an American politician and newspaper editor from Maryland. He served as a member of the Maryland House of Delegates, representing Harford County from 1894 to 1896.

== Early life ==
Harold Scarboro was born November 4, 1861, in Harford County, Maryland, to Silas Scarboro and Frances Emily Fantom Scarboro. His father was a surgeon in the Civil War, school commissioner, and member of the Maryland House of Delegates.

== Career ==
Scarboro was a Democrat. He served as a member of the Maryland House of Delegates, representing Harford County from 1894 to 1896.

Around 1894, Scarboro started his career in journalism with The Aegis. Scarboro worked as editor of the Harford Dispatch, a free silver paper. In June 1897, he became editor of the Baltimore Democrat. By 1900, he worked for the Baltimore Evening News. In 1905, Scarboro became the manager of The Towson News.

In 1905, Scarboro became manager of the newspaper The News by Robert Garrett. In 1917, Scarboro worked as a clerk in the office of the county commissioners in Towson. In 1918, Scarboro purchased The Union and combined it with The News. He sold The Union News of Towson in 1921 to Walter P. Reckord.

== Personal life ==
Around 1900, Scarboro moved from Bel Air to Catonsville.

Scarboro died on February 21, 1944, at The Preston in Baltimore.
