= James B. Preston (politician) =

American politician (died 1902)

Member of the Maryland House of Delegates from the Harford County district
- In office 1880–1884 Serving with William Grason Scott, Murray Vandiver, William Benjamin Baker, Silas Scarboro, David Wiley

Personal details
- Born: Harford County, Maryland, U.S.
- Died: December 20, 1902 (aged 76) Bel Air, Maryland, U.S.
- Resting place: Rock Spring Cemetery; Bel Air, Maryland, U.S.
- Party: Democratic
- Spouse(s): Mary A. Wilks (died 1874) Cornelia Holmes (died)
- Children: Walter and James
- Occupation: Politician

James B. Preston (died December 20, 1902) was an American politician from Maryland. He served as a member of the Maryland House of Delegates, representing Harford County from 1880 to 1884.

== Early life ==
James B. Preston was born near Rocks, in Harford County, Maryland. He was educated at Bel Air Academy.

== Career ==
Preston was a Democrat. He served as a member of the Maryland House of Delegates, representing Harford County from 1880 to 1884.

Preston owned a mill on Deer Creek.

== Personal life ==
Preston married Mary A. Wilks. They had two sons, Walter W., and James H. His son Walter was also a state delegate. His wife died in 1874. Preston married Cornelia E. Holmes, daughter of Judge John B. Holmes, on April 17, 1884. His wife died in 1887. He lived near Emmorton.

Preston died on December 20, 1902, at the age of 76, at the home of his son in Bel Air. He was buried at Rock Spring Cemetery in Bel Air.
