= Robert R. Vandiver =

American politician (1805–1885)

Member of the Maryland House of Delegates from the Harford County district
- In office 1868–1868 Serving with John S. Brown, Nicholas H. Nelson, Benjamin Silver

Personal details
- Born: July 22, 1805 Brandywine Hundred, New Castle County, Delaware, U.S.
- Died: September 4, 1885 (aged 80) Havre de Grace, Maryland, U.S.
- Resting place: Angel Hill Cemetery; Havre de Grace, Maryland, U.S.
- Party: Democratic
- Spouse: Mary Russell
- Children: 7, including Murray
- Occupation: Politician; contractor

Robert R. Vandiver (July 22, 1805 – September 4, 1885) was an American politician and contractor from Maryland. He served as a member of the Maryland House of Delegates, representing Harford County, in 1868.

== Early life ==
Robert R. Vandiver was born on July 22, 1805, in Brandywine Hundred, New Castle County, Delaware. At a young age, his family moved to Port Deposit, Maryland.

== Career ==
In 1838, Vandiver moved to Havre de Grace and worked as a contractor. He built the Protestant Episcopal Church in Easton, the Methodist Episcopal Church in Havre de Grace and the outlet lock of the Susquehanna and Tidewater Canal in Lapidum. He was the superintendent of the dig that allowed the Philadelphia, Wilmington and Baltimore Railroad to move their cars between Havre de Grace and Perryville on steamers.

Vandiver was a Democrat. Vandiver served as a member of the Maryland House of Delegates, representing Harford County, during the 1868 term.

Vandiver served as a member of the board of town commissioners of Havre de Grace for fourteen years, non-consecutively. He served in the democratic executive committee of Harford County.

== Personal life ==
Vandiver married Mary Russell (1810–1886). They had four sons and three daughters, George T., Robert R. Jr., Murray, Jacob, Martha, Alice and Ellen. His son Murray served as a member of the Maryland House of Delegates, Treasurer of Maryland and as mayor of Havre de Grace.

Vandiver died on September 4, 1885, at his home in Havre de Grace. He was buried at Angel Hill Cemetery in Havre de Grace.
