= Robert E. Doherty =

American academic administrator

Robert E. Doherty (1885–1950) was an American electrical engineer who served as the third President of Carnegie Mellon University in Pittsburgh, Pennsylvania.

== Early life ==
Doherty was born in Clay City, Illinois, then a rural area without electricity or a telegraph office. When electricity was introduced there, it fascinated him. He began to learn telegraphy while in high school and after graduation, worked as a telegrapher for the Baltimore and Ohio Railroad. He saved his money to attend prep school. At age 21 he enrolled in the University of Illinois hoping to study electrical engineering. He attended a lecture during his freshman year by Charles Steinmetz of the General Electric Company in Schenectady, New York. It inspired him to take a position at GE after graduation.

By 1918 Steinmetz promoted Doherty to be his assistant, and he served in this role until Steinmetz's death in 1923. Doherty next became a full-time consulting engineer at GE and began to teach problem-solving courses within the company to newly hired engineers. During this time Doherty continued his studies and earned an M.S. from Union College. The Great Depression took its toll on GE, however, and Doherty accepted an offer from Yale University. He became dean of the Yale School of Engineering & Applied Science in 1932. In 1936, he accepted the presidency at Carnegie Institute of Technology, today's Carnegie Mellon.

== Carnegie Tech years ==
Doherty's administration stressed graduate education. During his tenure the number of graduate students increased from 45 to 369. He also implemented an approach to undergraduate education in the 1940s called the "Carnegie Plan", a philosophy in which "students were taught to apply fundamental knowledge to solve practical problems and were required to learn about and appreciate academic disciplines outside their primary area of study". Doherty was unpopular with many students, however, when he de-emphasized football at Tech in the late 1930s, despite the national success of the team.

He retired from Carnegie Tech in 1950 and died later that year at his home in Scotia, New York. Doherty Hall, home of the Department of Chemical Engineering as well as Mellon College of Science labs, and the Doherty Apartment dorms on Carnegie Mellon's campus are named for him.

== Notes ==
Academic offices
Preceded by Thomas Baker	Carnegie Mellon University President; 1936 – 1950	Succeeded by John Warner
