= St. Ignatius Church (Forest Hill, Maryland) =

Historic church in Maryland, United States

- U.S. National Register of Historic Places
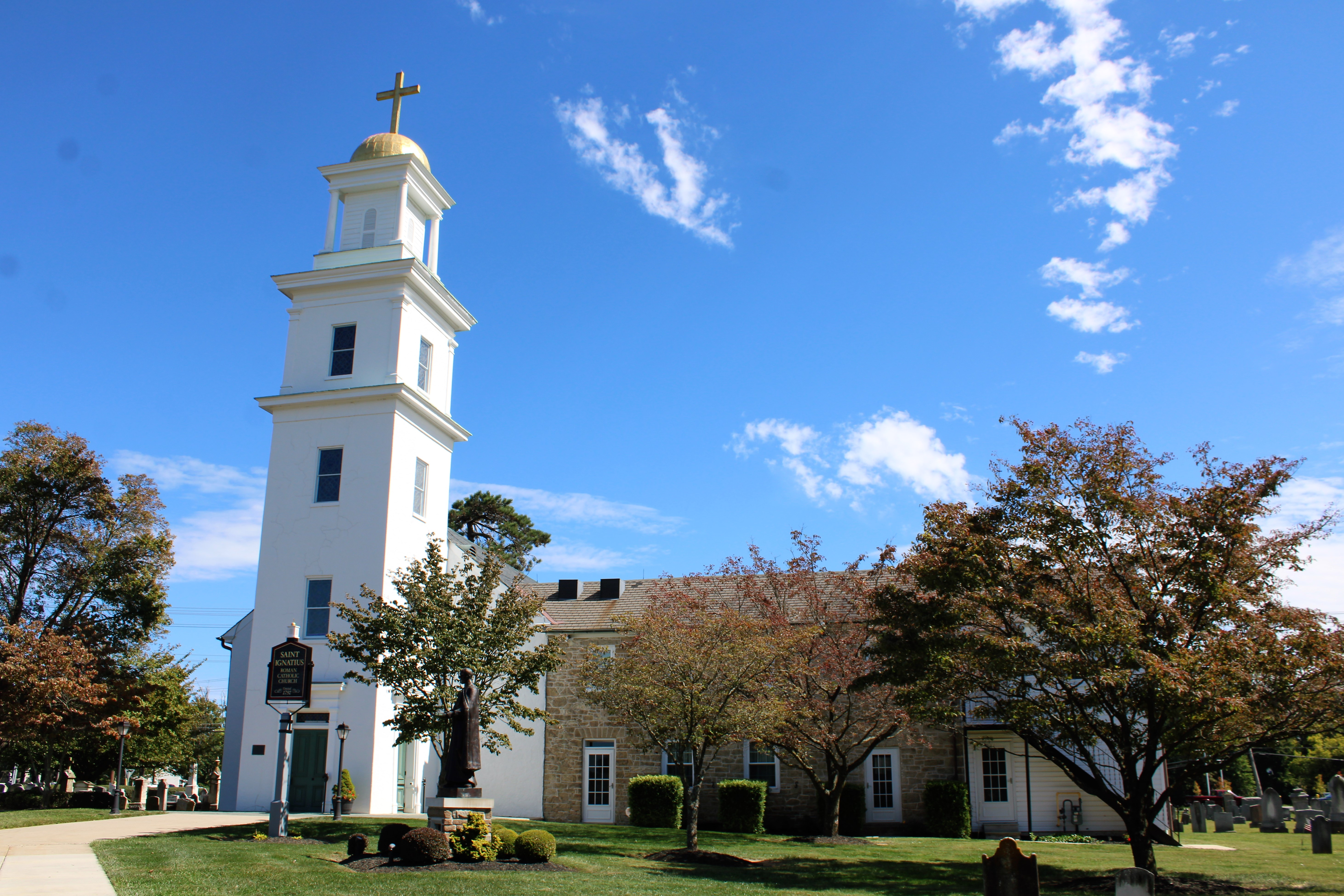
- Historic St. Ignatius Church in 2022

- Location within Maryland Location within the United States
- Location: 533 E. Jarrettsville Rd., Forest Hill, Maryland
- Coordinates: 39°34′25″N 76°21′19″W
- Area: 2 acres (0.81 ha)
- Built: 1789
- NRHP reference No.: 74000956
- Added to NRHP: April 16, 1974

St. Ignatius Church is a historic Roman Catholic Church located at Forest Hill, Harford County, Maryland. It is a rubble stone, one-story rectangular structure of five bays, with a tall tower at the west end and a rubble stone two-story rectangular addition. The original 35 feet by 50 feet church was built between 1786 and 1792.

== History ==
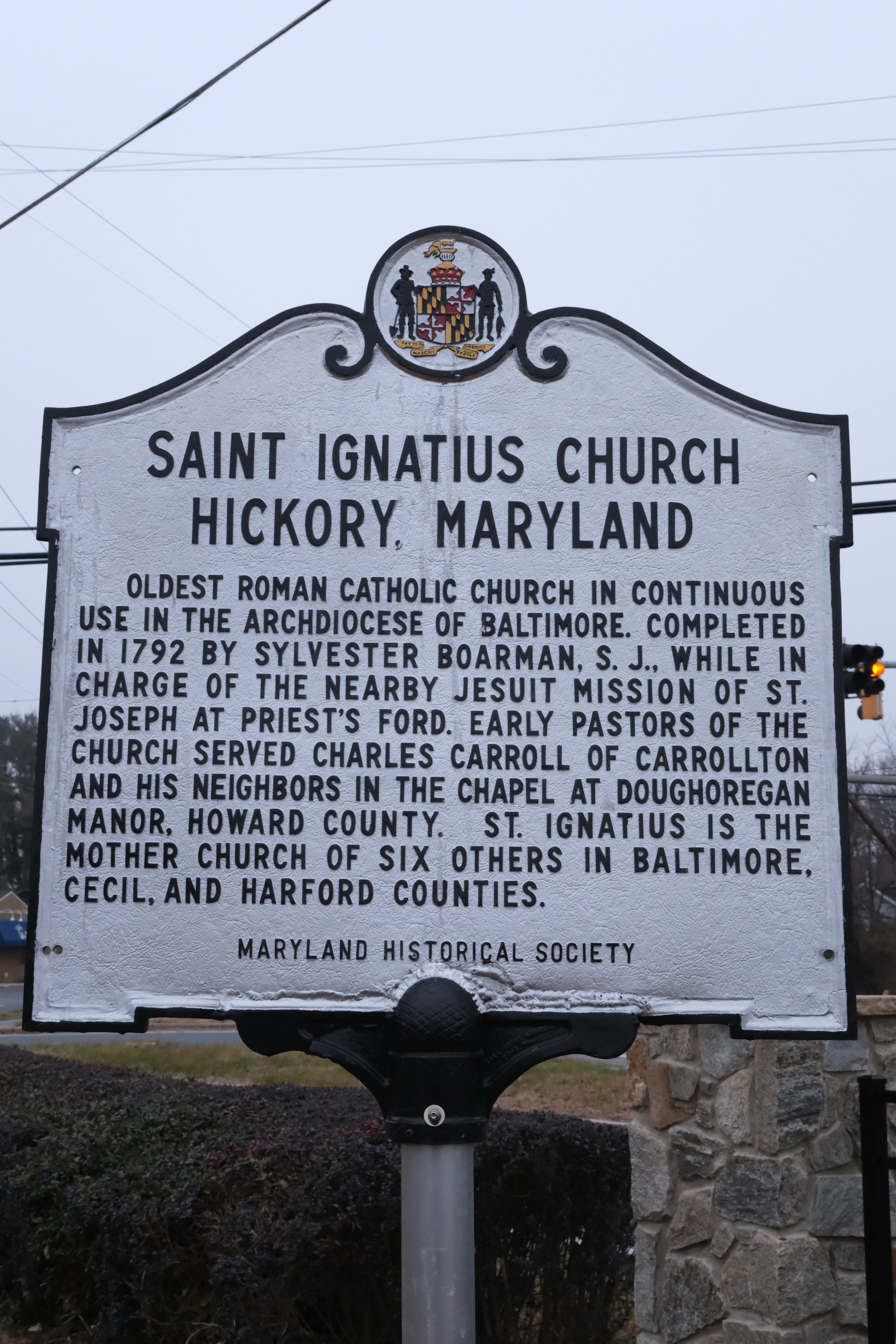
Plaque of Saint Ignatius Church

A major addition was made in 1848 and the tower was added in 1865. The parish hall wing was constructed in 1822 and a small frame sacristy was added in 1887. It is the oldest extant church in the Archdiocese of Baltimore.

It was listed on the National Register of Historic Places in 1974.

== Notable burials ==
- William M. Ady (died 1872), member of the Maryland House of Delegates
- George W. Richardson (died 1930), member of the Maryland House of Delegates
- Thomas H. Robinson (1859–1930), member of Maryland Senate and Attorney General of Maryland
- William Grason Scott (died 1882), member of the Maryland House of Delegates
