= Silas Scarboro =

American politician and physician (1827–1907)

Member of the Maryland House of Delegates from the Harford County district
- In office 1882–1882 Serving with William Benjamin Baker, James B. Preston, David Wiley
- In office 1878–1878 Serving with William Grason Scott and Murray Vandiver

Personal details
- Born: May 5, 1827 Harford County, Maryland, U.S.
- Died: August 7, 1907 (aged 80) Towson, Maryland, U.S.
- Resting place: Broad Creek Friends' Meeting House Cemetery
- Party: Democratic
- Spouse: Kate Bishop (m. 1859)
- Children: 3, including Harold
- Education: University of Maryland School of Medicine (MD)
- Occupation: Politician; physician

Silas Scarboro (May 5, 1827 – August 7, 1907) was an American politician and physician from Maryland. He served as a member of the Maryland House of Delegates, representing Harford County in 1878 and 1882.

== Early life ==
Silas Scarboro was born on May 5, 1827, in Scarboro, Harford County, Maryland, to Letitia (née Warner) and Samuel Scarboro. He attended common schools and the academy in Unionville, Chester County, Pennsylvania. He taught for a few years. He studied medicine under Professor Dunbar and graduated from the University of Maryland School of Medicine with a Doctor of Medicine in 1857.

== Career ==
On February 4, 1863, Scarboro entered the 2nd Maryland Infantry as an assistant surgeon of the Union Army during the Civil War. The regiment joined the Ninth Army Corps and he was transferred to Kentucky in April 1863. He was in charge of Camp Nelson. On May 1, 1864, the regiment joined the Army of the Potomac. He was present at the Battle of Cold Harbor and the Siege of Petersburg. Following some illnesses, he resigned on July 21, 1864, and received an honorable discharge. He then returned to his home in Maryland and worked as a physician.

Scarboro was a Democrat. From 1869 to 1875, he was county school commissioner. He served as a member of the Maryland House of Delegates, representing Harford County in 1878 and 1882. He also served as school commissioner of Harford County.

Scarboro broke both legs in 1887 when thrown from a sleigh, forcing him to retire from his medical practice in 1887.

== Personal life ==
Scarboro married Kate Bishop of Baltimore on May 12, 1859. They had two daughters and one son, Georgia (who married J. Sprigg Poole), Bertha and Harold. His wife died in 1872. His son was the editor of Towson News. He was affiliated with the Protestant Episcopal Church. He was a Quaker.

Scarboro died on August 7, 1907, at the age of 80, in Towson. He was buried at Broad Creek Friends' Meeting House Cemetery.
