= Samuel S. Bevard =

American politician (died 1940)

Member of the Maryland House of Delegates from the Harford County district
- In office 1892–1896 Serving with Thomas B. Hayward, John O. Stearns, Murray Vandiver, Harold Scarboro

Personal details
- Born: c. 1854 Harford County, Maryland, U.S.
- Died: March 29, 1940 Havre de Grace, Maryland, U.S.
- Resting place: Abingdon Methodist Cemetery; Abingdon, Maryland, U.S.
- Party: Democratic
- Spouse: Lida A. Buckingham (died 1938)
- Occupation: Politician; farmer; canner

Samuel S. Bevard (c. 1854 – March 29, 1940) was an American politician, farmer, and canner from Maryland. He served as a member of the Maryland House of Delegates, representing Harford County, from 1892 to 1896.

== Early life ==
Samuel S. Bevard was born in Harford County, Maryland around 1854 to Wakeman H. Bevard. His father was a farmer and owned the 145 acres (59 ha) "Willow Valley" farm. His grandfather George Bevard was present at the Battle of Baltimore. Bevard studied at public schools and attended Bel Air Academy.

== Career ==
Bevard worked as a canner and farmer. He was also connected with road and farmers' conventions.

Bevard was a Democrat. Bevard served as a member of the Maryland House of Delegates, representing Harford County, from 1892 to 1896.

He later worked as a clerk in the state's treasurer office.

== Personal life ==
Bevard married Lida A. Buckingham. She died in 1938.

Bevard died on March 29, 1940, at Havre de Grace Hospital. He was interred at Abingdon Methodist Cemetery.
