= Murray Vandiver =

American politician (1845–1916)

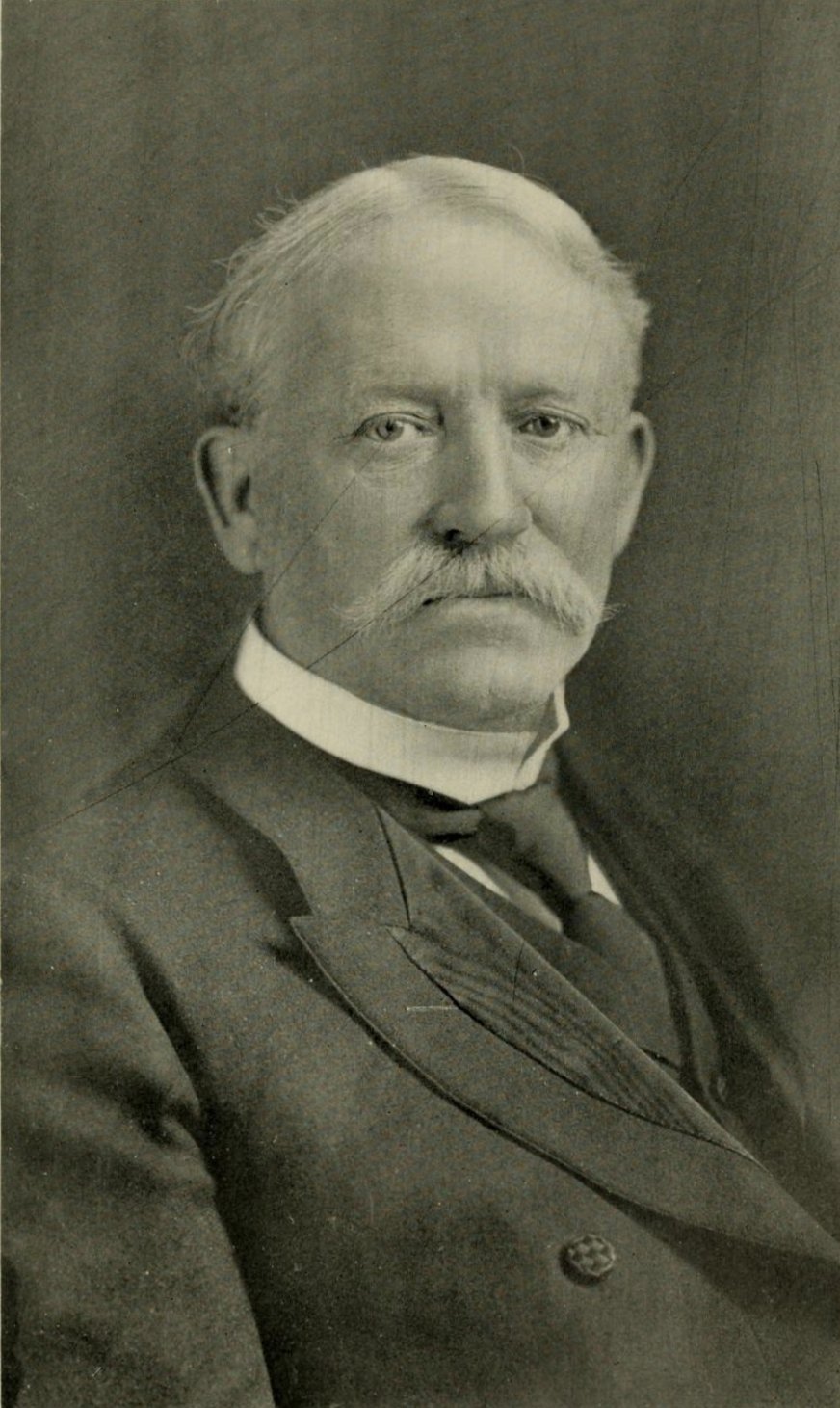
- Vandiver in 1911 publication

Treasurer of Maryland
- In office 1900–1916
- Preceded by: Thomas J. Shryock
- Succeeded by: John M. Dennis

Speaker of the Maryland House of Delegates
- In office 1892
- Preceded by: John Hubner
- Succeeded by: James H. Preston

Mayor of Havre de Grace, Maryland
- In office 1885–1886
- Preceded by: J. Thompson Frieze
- Succeeded by: J. Thompson Frieze

Member of the Maryland House of Delegates from the Harford County district
- In office 1892–1894 Serving with Samuel S. Bevard, Thomas B. Hayward, John O. Stearns
- In office 1876–1882 Serving with Andrew Boyle, Patrick H. Rutledge, Silas Scarboro, William G. Scott, James B. Preston

Personal details
- Born: September 14, 1845 Havre de Grace, Maryland, U.S.
- Died: May 23, 1916 (aged 70) Blue Ridge Summit, Pennsylvania, U.S.
- Resting place: Angel Hill Cemetery; Havre de Grace, Maryland, U.S.
- Party: Democratic
- Spouse: Annie Clayton (m. 1886)
- Children: 2
- Parent: Robert R. Vandiver (father)
- Education: Eastman Business College
- Occupation: Politician; lumber worker; shipper

Murray Vandiver (September 14, 1845 – May 23, 1916) was Treasurer of Maryland from 1900 to 1916. He also served as member of the Maryland House of Delegates and mayor of Havre de Grace, Maryland.

== Early life ==
Murray Vandiver was born on September 14, 1845, in Havre de Grace, Maryland to Mary (née Russell) (1810–1886) and Robert R. Vandiver (1805–1885). His father was a descendant of early Delaware settlers and served as a member of the Maryland House of Delegates. His father was a contractor and builder and worked on a lock at Lapidum, Maryland for the Susquehanna and Tidewater Canal and a railroad tie at St. Clair Street (now Pennington Street) in Havre de Grace.

Vandiver was educated in public schools in Harford County, including Havre de Grace Academy. He graduated from Eastman Business College in Poughkeepsie, New York, in December 1864.

== Career ==
Vandiver started a lumber business in Havre de Grace in 1865. He remained there until 1878. He then joined his father in the business of shipping brick moulding sand. His father died in 1885 and he ran the business until 1890.

Vandiver was a Democrat. He served in the Maryland House of Delegates in 1876, 1878, 1880, and 1892. In 1881, he was defeated by Herman Stump. He was one of the signers of the charter of Havre de Grace and served as mayor from 1885 to 1886. In 1892, he served as Speaker of the Maryland House of Delegates. In 1892, he was appointed a commissioner for the World's Columbian Exposition. In June 1893, President Grover Cleveland appointed him Collector of Internal Revenue for Maryland, the District of Columbia, Delaware and Virginia's Eastern Shore. He served in this role from July 1, 1893, to 1897. He was a delegate to the 1892, 1896, 1900 and 1904 Democratic National Conventions. He served as chairman of the Democratic State Central Committee from August 12, 1897, until his death. He served as secretary and treasurer of the committee from 1887 to 1892.

Vandiver served as a colonel on the staff of Governor Robert M. McLane and brigadier general on the staff of Governor John Walter Smith. He served as Treasurer of Maryland from 1900 to 1916. He lost the last election to John M. Dennis.

Vandiver was the director of the First National Bank of Havre de Grace, Commonwealth Bank of Baltimore, Commonwealth Savings Bank, American Banking and Trust Company of Baltimore, Third National Bank of Baltimore, National Bank of Port Deposit and the Delaware Railroad. He also served as director for philanthropic organizations in Havre de Grace, including the Harford Agricultural Society, Maryland Agricultural College, Havre de Grace Improvement Company and the Havre de Grace Water Company. He was trustee of the Maryland Agricultural College.

== Personal life ==
Vandiver married Annie Clayton, of Tamaqua, Pennsylvania, on June 23, 1886, in Philadelphia. She was the daughter of Henry Clayton, an engineer and operator of the Little Schuylkill Railroad. They had two children: Robert M. and Dorothy.

Vandiver bought land from Havre de Grace mayor J. Thompson Frieze. In 1886, he built a Queen Anne style house in Havre de Grace, Maryland, at 301 South Union Avenue that would be called the "Vandiver Mansion".

Vandiver died on May 23, 1916, following liver problems and tuberculosis, at his cottage near Blue Ridge Summit, Pennsylvania. He was interred at Angel Hill Cemetery in Havre de Grace.

== Legacy ==
Vandiver received silver service after his election to treasurer in 1900. The items were commissioned by the Democratic Party and manufactured by Samuel Kirk & Son Co. of Baltimore. The articles are in the possession of the Maryland State Art Collection.

The Vandiver mansion at 301 South Union Avenue in Havre de Grace was converted into the Vandiver Inn in September 1987. The property is now used as a bed and breakfast.
