= Franklin Hanway =

American politician

Member of the Maryland House of Delegates from the Harford County district
- In office 1858–1858 Serving with Thomas M. Bacon and John H. Baker

Personal details
- Occupation: Politician

Franklin Hanway was an American politician from Maryland. He served as a member of the Maryland House of Delegates, representing Harford County in 1858.

== Career ==
Hanway served as a committee clerk with the Maryland House of Delegates. Hanway served as a member of the Maryland House of Delegates, representing Harford County in 1858.
