= Tom Hanway =

American musician

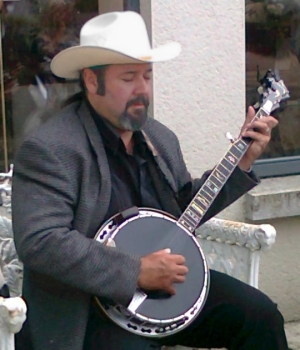
Tom Hanway

Tom Hanway was born on August 20, 1961, in Cleveland, Ohio, grew up in Larchmont, Westchester County, New York, and attended Hampshire College. He is an American 5-string banjoist, composer, author, and an originator of "Celtic fingerstyle" banjo. In 1998, he and luthier Geoff Stelling co-designed the Stelling Tom Hanway SwallowTail banjo, available in both standard and deluxe models, used in bluegrass, folk, and Celtic music around the world.

== Influences and early career ==
Tom Hanway learned to play the banjo in the 1980s, studying with Tony Trischka and Bill Keith, being inspired by their music and the music of Earl Scruggs, Ralph Stanley, Don Reno, Béla Fleck, David Bromberg, Jerry Garcia, the Grateful Dead, and Vassar Clements. In the late 80s and early 90s he worked with the John Herald Band (formerly the Greenbriar Boys), Blue Horizon, Burnt Toast, and with Kenny Kosek in the off-Broadway bluegrass musical Feast Here Tonight.

Hanway has played on dozens of recordings on both sides of the Atlantic, and has produced three recordings on his Joyous Gard Records label; for Bucket of Bees, he teamed up with Sam Bush, Jerry Douglas, Stuart Duncan, David Grier, Tony Trischka, Bill Keith and Vassar Clements in Nashville and New York City . He has performed onstage with Bill Monroe, Peter Rowan, Vassar Clements, Rick Danko and Levon Helm. In the 1990s and early 2000s, he and Kathleen Low Hanway (1960–2002) organized the St. Mark’s Bluegrass Festival. In 2005, he won the European Bluegrass Music Association's 'European Bluegrass Band of the Year' award as a member of the Ravens.

== Irish and Celtic music ==
In 1998, Mel Bay Publications published Hanway’s seminal book and CD, [[Complete Book of Irish & Celtic 5-String Banjo https://www.melbay.com/Products/95759M/complete-book-of-irish--celtic-5string-banjo.aspx]] wrote in January 1999: "What Earl Scruggs' book did for bluegrass banjo, Tom Hanway's book may well do for the 5-string in Irish and Celtic music, and will certainly become regarded as 'the bible' for any 5-string player with an interest in this joyous music."

Hanway is a music journalist and contributing writer to the Celtic League, American Branch, Perspective and Meaning in Celtic Music. He is a member of the United Arts Club in Dublin, promoting traditional music concerts, including Irish, bluegrass and folk music. He now calls Ireland home and resides in Longford town. Currently Hanway remains a sought after talent on the Irish bluegrass scene where he plays with the top bands.

== Discography ==
- Bucket of Bees (Joyous Gard, 1991)
- Tom Hanway & Blue Horizon (Joyous Gard, 1992)
- Burnt Toast (Joyous Gard, 1996)
- Complete Book of Irish & Celtic 5-String Banjo (Mel Bay, 1998) – companion CD to Complete Book of Irish & Celtic 5-String Banjo
- Grillbillies Album, Volumes 1 and 2 (Yee Haw, 1999)
- The Badbelly Project: Hesitation Blues (Joyous Gard, 2005)
