= Andrew Boyle (politician) =

American politician (died 1902)

Member of the Maryland House of Delegates from the Harford County district
- In office 1876–1876 Serving with Patrick H. Rutledge and Murray Vandiver

Personal details
- Died: December 11, 1902 (aged 80) Port Deposit, Maryland, U.S.
- Party: Democratic
- Occupation: Politician

Andrew Boyle (died December 11, 1902) was an American politician from Maryland. He served as a member of the Maryland House of Delegates, representing Harford County in 1876.

== Career ==
Boyle was a Democrat. Boyle ran for the Democratic nomination of the Maryland House of Delegates in the 1873 election. Boyle was a member of the Maryland House of Delegates, representing Harford County in 1876. He was unsuccessful in running for the Democratic nomination in the 1877 election.

== Personal life ==
Boyle had several children.

Boyle was president of the Red Seal Packing Association, which was an organization of canners.

Boyle died on December 11, 1902, at the age of 80, at his daughter's home in Port Deposit, Maryland.
