= Otho Scott =

American politician (died 1864)

Member of the Maryland Senate
- In office 1838–1843
- Preceded by: Office established
- Succeeded by: James Moores
- Constituency: Harford County

Personal details
- Born: 1796/7
- Died: March 9, 1864 (aged 67) Baltimore, Maryland, U.S.
- Spouse(s): Miss Boarman; Miss Grason
- Children: 3, including William
- Occupation: Politician; lawyer

Otho Scott (1796/7 - March 9, 1864) was an American politician and lawyer from Maryland. He served as a member of the Maryland Senate, representing Harford County from 1838 to 1843.

== Early life ==
Otho Scott read law with Israel D. Maulsby and was admitted to the bar.

== Career ==
Otho Scott worked as a lawyer in Maryland. He was the chief codifier of the Maryland code in 1860. He was counsel for the Philadelphia, Wilmington and Baltimore Railroad (later the Pennsylvania Railroad).

Scott served as a member of the Governors' Council in 1827 and 1830. Scott served as a member of the Maryland Senate, representing Harford County, from 1838 to 1843.

Later in life, he practiced law with Henry D. Farnandis.

== Personal life ==
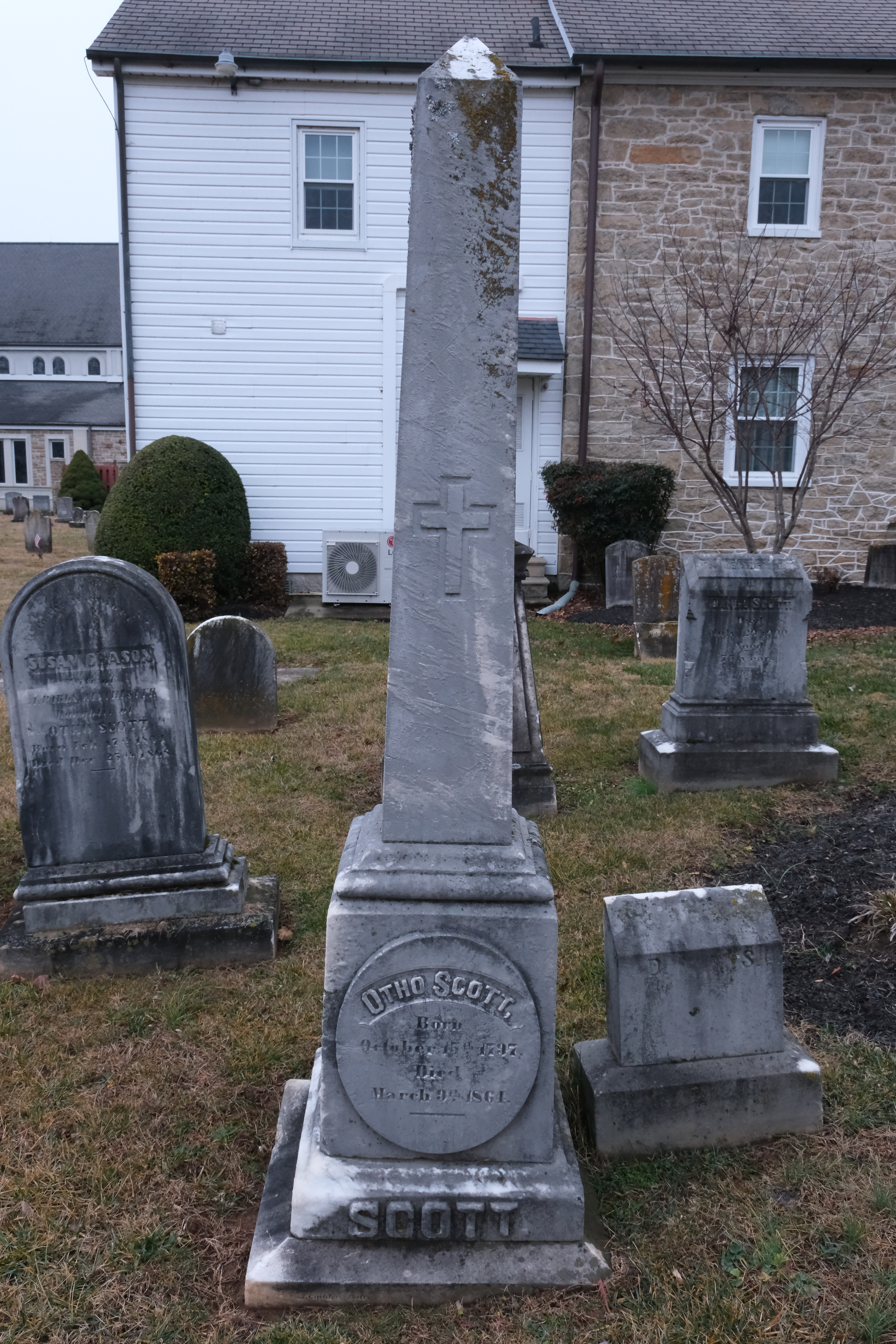
Grave of Scott at Saint Ignatius Cemetery

Scott married Miss Boarman. They had two children, Daniel and Mrs. Parks Winchester. He married Miss Grason, daughter of judge Richard Grason. They had one son, William Grason Scott. His son William would serve as a state delegate. He had a home near Bel Air.

Scott died on March 9, 1864, at the age of 67, in Baltimore.
