= Howard W. Jackson =

American politician (1877–1960)

39th Mayor of Baltimore
- In office 1931–1943
- Preceded by: William Frederick Broening
- Succeeded by: Theodore McKeldin
- In office 1923–1927
- Preceded by: William Frederick Broening
- Succeeded by: William Frederick Broening

Personal details
- Born: Howard Wilkinson Jackson; August 4, 1877 Baltimore, Maryland, U.S.
- Died: August 31, 1960 (aged 83)
- Party: Democratic
- Education: University of Maryland, Baltimore

Howard Wilkinson Jackson (August 4, 1877 – August 31, 1960) was the Mayor of Baltimore, Maryland for two separate mayoral administrations, the first of four years from 1923 to 1927 and the second administration of three terms of four years each (12 years) from 1931-1943, especially being influential during the "hard times" of economic upheaval of the "Great Depression", building and organizing a municipal social welfare system for the massive numbers of unemployed, homeless and destitute in Baltimore during along with the beginning of the defense build-up and war effort for World War II that transformed the City.

As a still, influential former mayor of the City, he later supported the racial integration of the student body of musicians at the Peabody Conservatory of Music in the Peabody Institute in 1949, the relatively smooth integration of the local Baltimore City Public Schools in September 1954, and added his support to later mayoral administrations of Mayors Thomas L.J. D'Alesandro, Jr., J. Harold Grady, and Board of School Commissioners efforts after the United States Supreme Court unanimous decision of May 1954, in Brown vs. Board of Education of Topeka, Kansas.

Under his first mayoralty, a large number of public schools were constructed, including several co-educational secondary schools including Forest Park High School in the northwestern City and a new "Castle on the Hill" landmark structure of Collegiate Gothic stone architecture for the "capstone of Baltimore's public education": The Baltimore City College, third oldest public high school in America, when ground was broken and cornerstone laid in 1924. When completed four years later it was the most expensive and elaborate high school built in America at the time
