= Thomas H. Robinson =

American politician and lawyer (1859–1930)

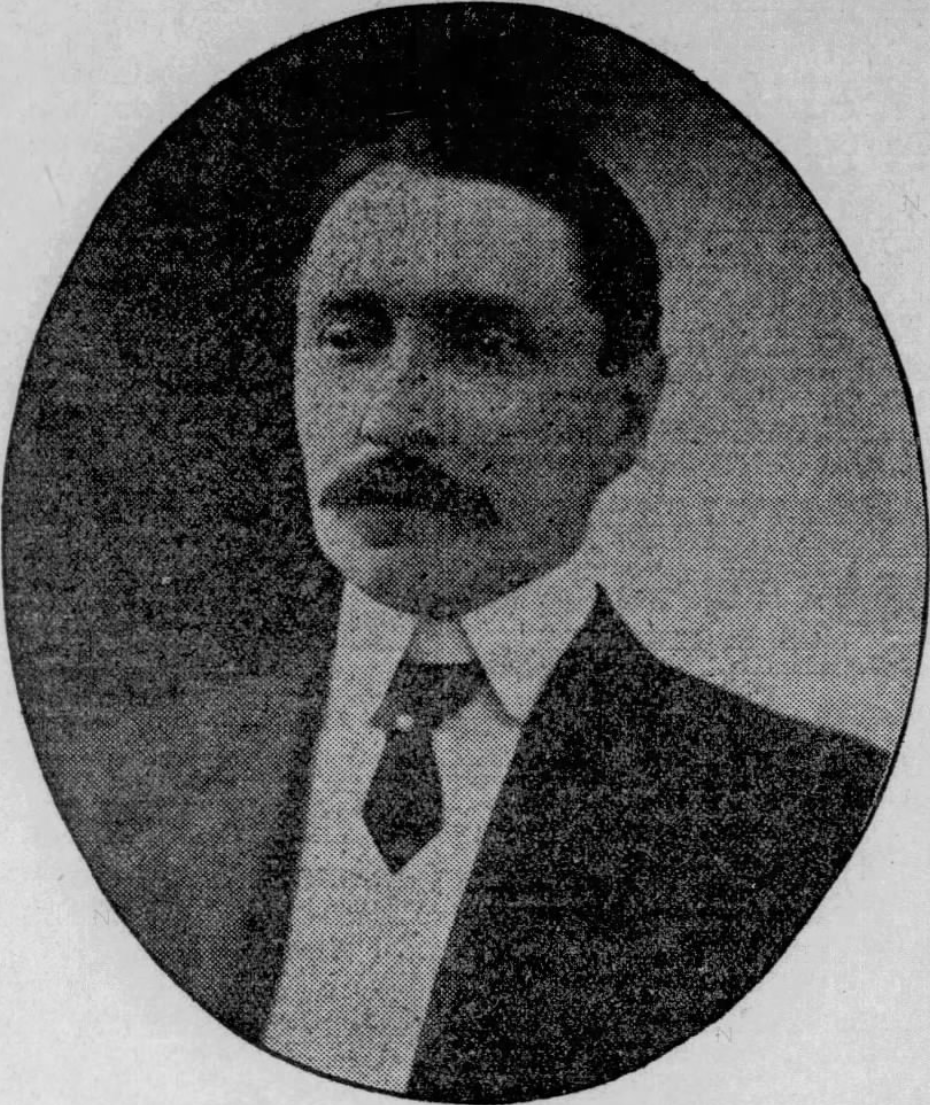
- Robinson in 1905 newspaper

Attorney General of Maryland
- In office 1923–1930
- Governor: Albert Ritchie
- Preceded by: Alexander Armstrong
- Succeeded by: William Preston Lane Jr.

Member of the Maryland Senate
- In office 1902–1904
- Preceded by: Stevenson A. Williams
- Succeeded by: William Benjamin Baker
- Constituency: Harford County
- In office 1892
- Preceded by: Benjamin Silver Jr.
- Succeeded by: William Benjamin Baker
- Constituency: Harford County

Personal details
- Born: Thomas Hall Robinson; March 2, 1859 near Bel Air, Maryland, U.S.
- Died: October 12, 1930 (aged 71) Bel Air, Maryland, U.S.
- Resting place: St. Ignatius Church; Hickory, Maryland, U.S.
- Party: Democratic
- Spouse: Clara C. Cain (m. 1884)
- Children: 5
- Occupation: Politician; lawyer; bank president

Thomas Hall Robinson (March 2, 1859 – October 12, 1930) was an American politician and lawyer from Maryland. He served in the Maryland Senate in 1892 and 1902 to 1906. He served as Attorney General of Maryland from 1923 to his death in 1930.

== Early life ==
Thomas Hall Robinson was born on March 2, 1859, near Bel Air, Maryland, to Mary C. (née Prigg) and Samuel S. Robinson. As a boy, Robinson lived near Hickory, Maryland, and had to travel three miles to school in Bel Air. Robinson studied law with Henry D. Farnandis of Bel Air and was admitted to the bar on May 11, 1882.

== Career ==
Robinson was a Democrat. He was elected in 1891 to the Maryland Senate, representing Harford County in 1892. He replaced Benjamin Silver Jr. who died in office. Robinson was not a candidate in 1893. He served as chairman of the judiciary committee and led the fight for the Haman oyster bill, to help rehabilitate the oyster industry. He also supported legislation for county roads. He was elected again to the Maryland Senate, for a four-year term, from 1902 to 1906. In 1904, Robinson assisted Baltimore political boss Isaac Freeman Rasin in helping Isidor Rayner become senator, despite the machinations of political boss Arthur Pue Gorman. Robinson ended up disagreeing with Rayner in Rayner's support of the Poe Suffrage Amendment. After Gorman's death, Robinson would align politically with John Walter Smith until 1923, when he disagreed with the renomination of Governor Albert Ritchie. He was a delegate to the Democratic National Convention four times, he served as chairman of the state delegation during the 1920 and 1924 Democratic National Conventions.

After his last term as state senator, Robinson returned to practicing law. In 1922, Robinson defended Harry Benjamin Wolf for who was charged with trying to thwart justice in the trial for the murder of William Norris. Robinson then publicly endorsed Governor Ritchie for re-election and Robinson was added to Ritchie's ticket as candidate for attorney general. Robinson was elected as Attorney General of Maryland in 1923, succeeding Alexander Armstrong. In 1926, Robinson was re-elected as attorney general for a four-year term. As attorney general, Robinson upheld the ruling of Armstrong that the Baltimore Police Department did not have the duty or authority to uphold the Volstead Act. During World War I, Robinson was the chairman of all liberty loan committees for Harford County and served as the chairman of the county's council of defense.

After getting admitted to the bar, Robinson practiced law. While attorney general, Robinson served as attorney in Harford County for the Pennsylvania Railroad. This was considered by some to be a conflict of interest with a ruling he made. In October 1930, Robinson was campaigning for re-election as attorney general when he fell sick and had to pull out of the campaign tour in southern Maryland.

In 1894, Robinson was elected president of Second National Bank of Bel Air. He held this position until his death.

== Personal life ==
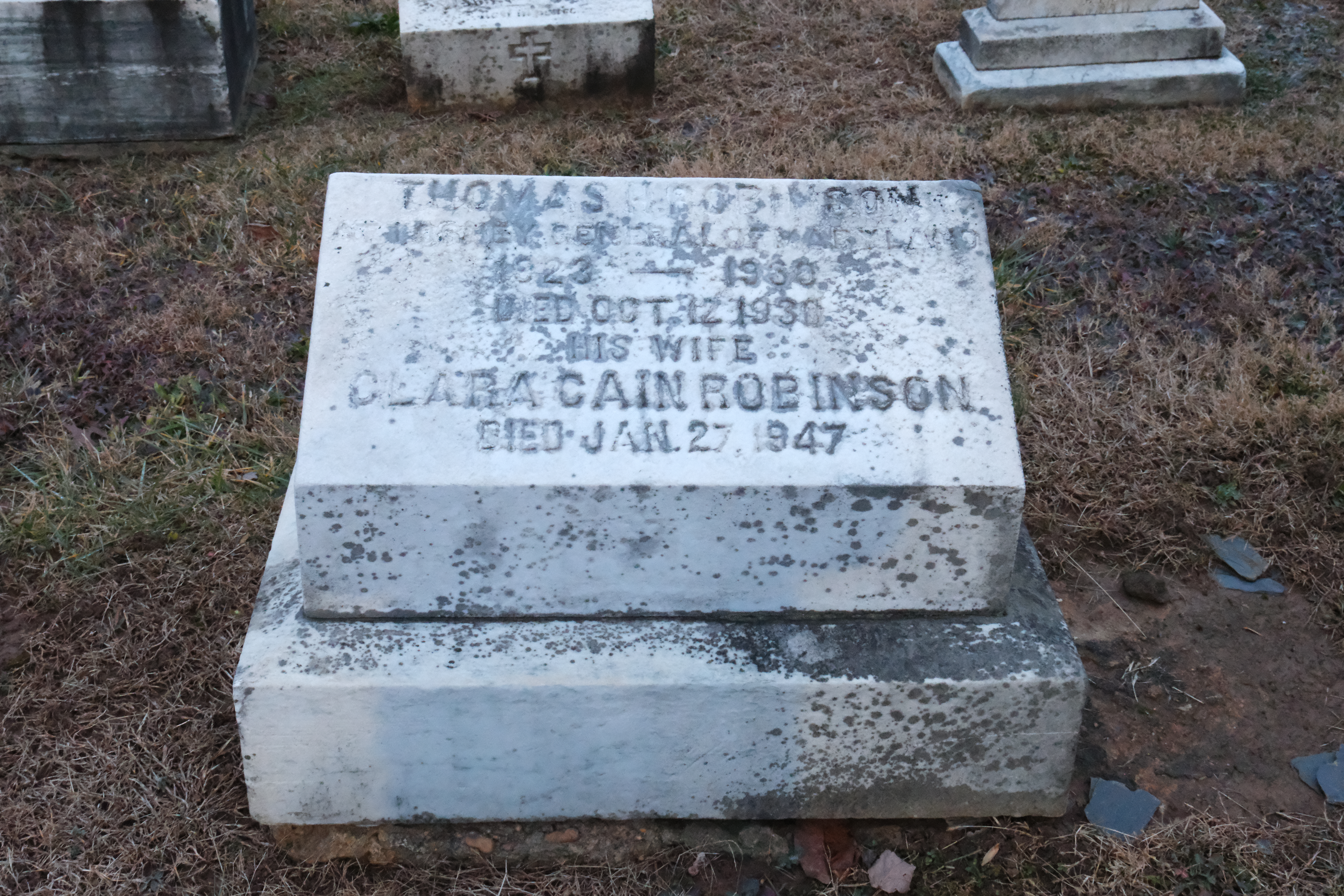
Grave of Robinson at Saint Ignatius Cemetery

Robinson married Clara C. Cain, daughter of Judge J. M. Cain, on September 17, 1884. They had five children, Lucile, Madeleine, Elizabeth, Thomas Hall Robinson Jr. and Clara. His daughter Madeleine married state senator Howard S. O'Neill.

Robinson died following a heart attack on October 12, 1930, at his home in Bel Air. He was buried at St. Ignatius Church's burial grounds in Hickory.
