= The Southern Aegis =

US Civil War-era newspaper

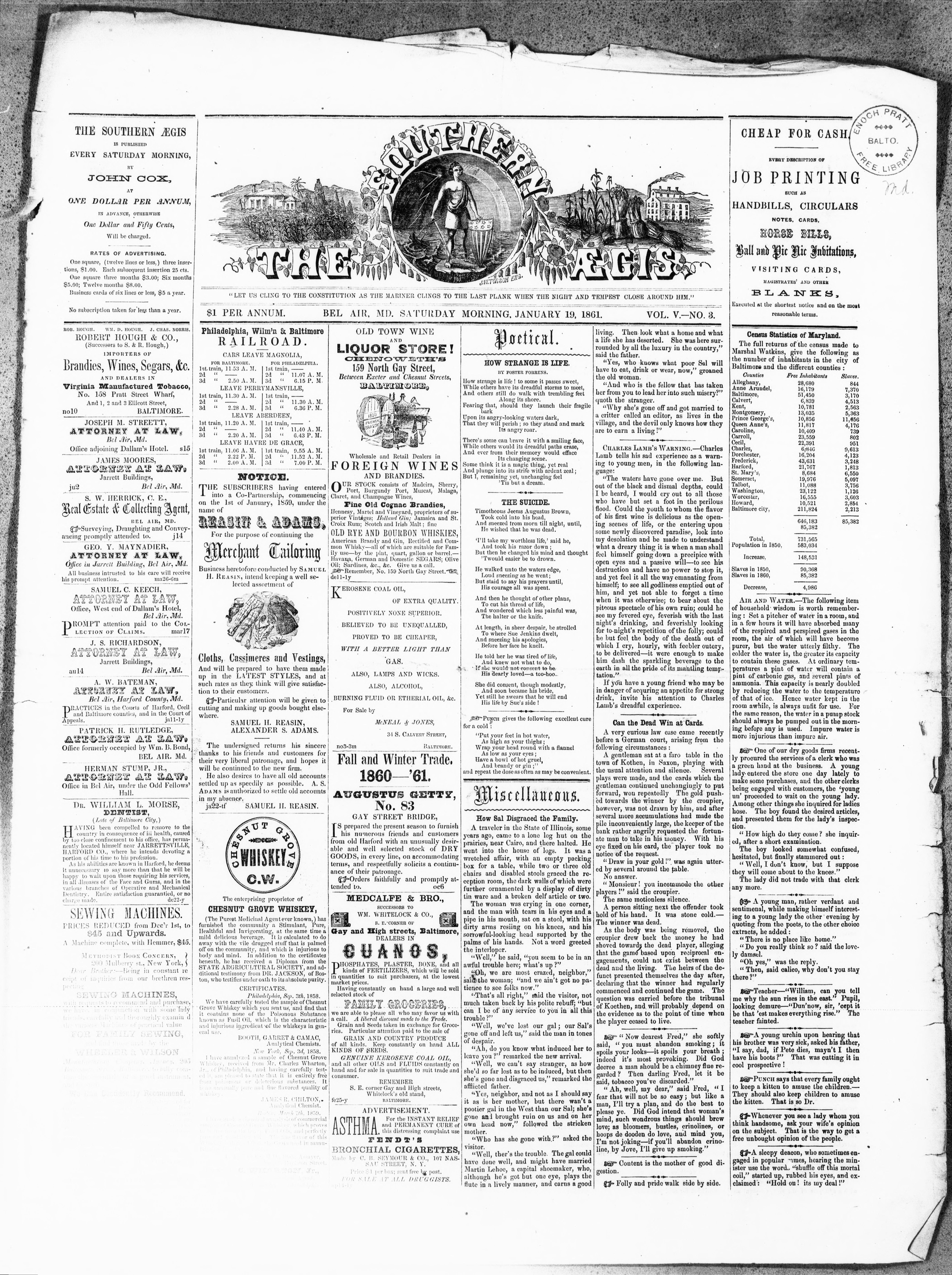
- The cover page of the January 19, 1861 issue
- Type: Weekly newspaper
- Founder(s): John Cox and George Yellott
- Publisher: John Cox
- Editor: John Carroll Walsh
- Founded: 1856
- Ceased publication: February 1, 1862
- Relaunched: February 2, 1862, The Southern Aegis, and Harford County Intelligencer
- Political alignment: pro-Confederacy
- Language: English
- Headquarters: Bel Air, Maryland, U.S.
- OCLC number: 9406104

The Southern Aegis was a pro-Southern newspaper established in 1856 by George Yellott and John Cox and published from July 11, 1857, to February 1, 1862, in Bel Air, Maryland, U.S. The name "Aegis" originally derived from Greek mythology and is a reference to Zeus' shield, meant to "evoke protection for the interests of Harford residents" as well as the paper's Southern sympathies.

== Politics ==
Cox's editorial tone was overwhelmingly negative towards the Union, and he became known as an "editor of the old school, violent in his sympathies and in his editorials" with a signature "old fashioned Jacksonian style." The Aegis and the other local paper, the National American, became voices for the opposing sides of the national conflict; The Aegis was even referred to by a Baltimore newspaper as "the Traitor Aegis".

However, Cox eventually realized that there was not enough support for the Confederate cause in Harford County to continue publishing, and in 1862, he resigned and sold the paper to a prominent local lawyer named A.W. Bateman, who changed the name of the paper to The Southern Aegis, and Harford County Intelligencer. Bateman changed the tone of the paper to a conservative Unionist stance, which continued under his successor, Frederick W. Baker. Baker purchased the newspaper in 1864 and slightly changed its name to The Aegis & Intelligencer. The Aegis & Intelligencer was sold to John D. Worthington, Sr. in 1904, but kept its name until 1923, when it was changed to The Aegis (newspaper).

The Aegis went through several name changes over the years: it became The Aegis and Harford Gazette in 1951, then The Aegis the Harford Gazette and the Democratic Ledger in 1964, and finally back to The Aegis in 1969, which it remains to this day. The paper remained in the hands of the Worthington family until 1986, when it was acquired by the Times Mirror Company, then-owners of The Baltimore Sun.
