= The Southern Aegis, and Harford County Intelligencer =

Defunct American newspaper

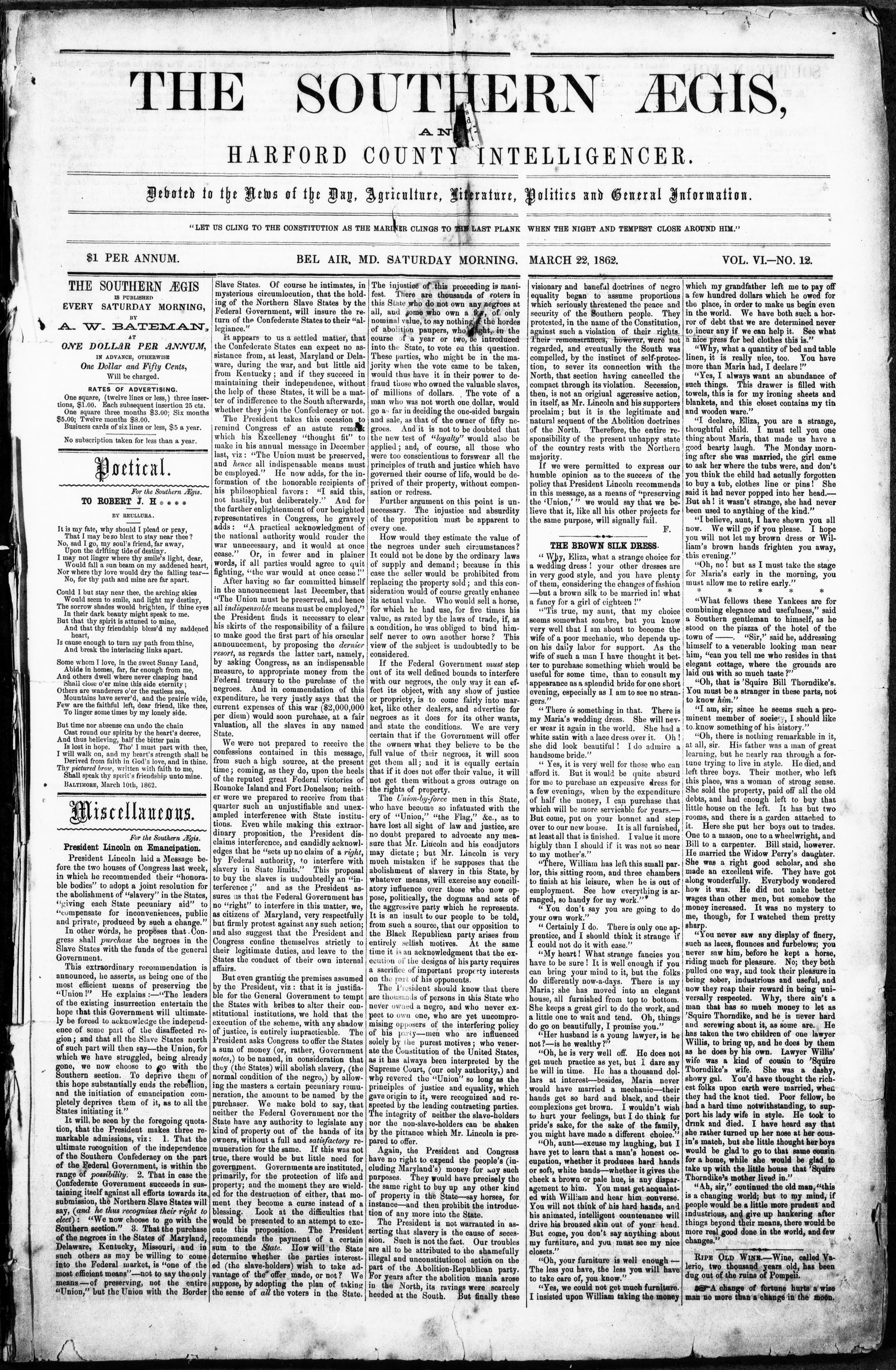
- The cover page for the March 22, 1862 issue
- Type: Weekly newspaper
- Founder: John Cox
- Publisher: A.W. Bateman
- Editor: A.W. Bateman
- Founded: 1856
- Ceased publication: 1864
- Relaunched: 1864, The Aegis & Intelligencer
- Political alignment: conservative Unionist
- Language: English
- Headquarters: Bel Air, Maryland, U.S.
- OCLC number: 18832454

The Southern Aegis, and Harford County Intelligencer was a conservative Unionist newspaper which was published from March 22, 1862, to March 11, 1864, in Bel Air, Maryland by a prominent local lawyer, A.W. Bateman. After purchasing the paper as a pro-Confederate publication titled The Southern Aegis from John Cox in 1862, Bateman slightly altered the name of the paper as well as its political stance. In 1864, the title was again changed to the simplified The Aegis & Intelligencer, and Frederick W. Baker became the new publisher and editor. Baker sold The Aegis & Intelligencer to John D. Worthington, Sr. in 1904, but kept its name until 1923, when it was changed to The Aegis.
