= Fleury F. Sullivan =

American politician (1870–1951)

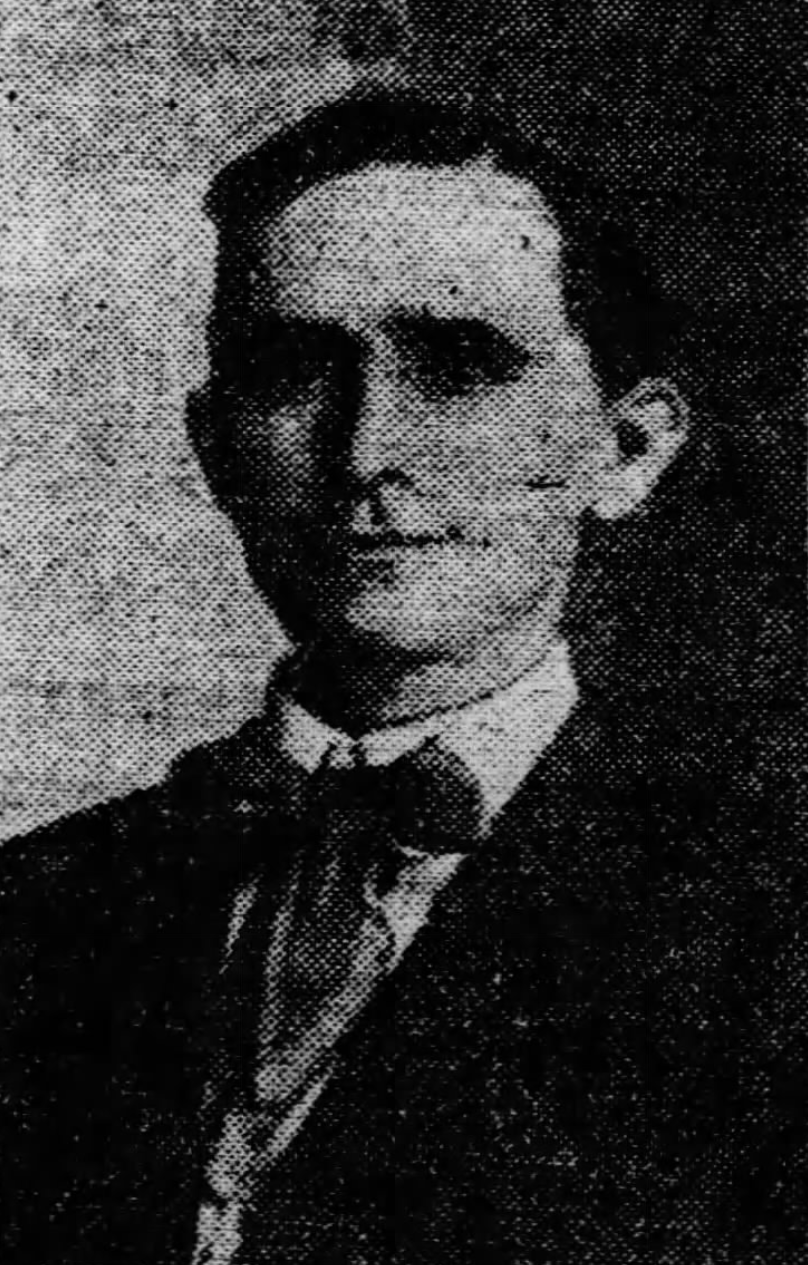
- Sullivan (c. 1909)
- In office 1910–1911 Serving with John W. Archer, Martin L. Jarrett, Henry A. Osborn Jr.
- Constituency: Harford County

Personal details
- Born: 1870 Magnolia, Harford County, Maryland, U.S.
- Died: January 1, 1951 (aged 80–81) Edgewood, Maryland, U.S.
- Resting place: St. Francis Church Cemetery; Abingdon, Maryland, U.S.
- Party: Democratic
- Spouse: Elizabeth A. Linsenmyer
- Children: 5
- Occupation: Politician

Fleury F. Sullivan (1870 – January 1, 1951) was an American politician from Maryland. He served as a member of the Maryland House of Delegates, representing Harford County, from 1910 to 1911.

== Early life ==
Fleury F. Sullivan was born in 1870 on a farm near Magnolia in Harford County, Maryland, the son of Thomas Sullivan. He attended public schools until the age of 16.

== Career ==
In 1891, Sullivan began working in the telegraph department of the Baltimore and Ohio Railroad. He remained with the railroad for 50 years.

A Democrat, Sullivan served in the Maryland House of Delegates, representing Harford County, from 1910 to 1911. He advocated an eight-hour workday for telegraphers, a measure introduced in 1906 and 1907 by Walter R. McComas.

In 1911, Sullivan was one of the Democratic candidates for the House of Delegates following a tie vote in the primary with Joseph W. Archer. Archer later withdrew from the nomination. He was again a candidate for the House of Delegates in 1915.

According to later newspaper accounts, Sullivan blamed his loss in the 1916 race on Democratic leadership, beginning a political feud that lasted for two decades. In 1940, the feud contributed to a split between Sullivan and Robert H. Archer. Sullivan supported Howard Bruce for the U.S. Senate, while his son Paul L. Sullivan supported George L. P. Radcliffe. Later, the alignments reversed, with Paul Sullivan backing Herbert O'Conor and Sullivan supporting Radcliffe.

Sullivan also served for 15 years as vice chairman of the Order of Railroad Telegraphers.

== Personal life ==
Sullivan married Elizabeth A. Linsenmyer. They had five children: Paul L., Joseph C., Francis A., Elizabeth, and Florence. The family lived at Van Bibber, Maryland.

His son Francis A. Sullivan was reported missing in Germany in 1938. He was later found to have drowned after falling from a ferry.

Sullivan had a heart attack on December 25, 1950. He died on January 1, 1951, at his home in Edgewood, Maryland. He was buried in the cemetery adjoining St. Francis Church in Abingdon, Maryland.
