= Robert Duvall (disambiguation) =

Robert Duvall (1931–2026) was an American actor and filmmaker.

Robert Duvall may also refer to:

== People ==
- Robert E. Duvall (fl. 1856), American politician from Maryland
- Robert Duvall (politician) (born 1970), American politician from Kentucky

== See also ==
- Robert Duval (c. 1510–1567), French alchemist
