= Francis Butler (politician) =

American politician and physician (1809–1883)

Member of the Maryland House of Delegates from the Harford County district
- In office 1842–1842 Serving with Thomas Chew Hopkins, Luther M. Jarrett, Coleman Yellott

Personal details
- Born: April 13, 1809 Harford County, Maryland, U.S.
- Died: May 31, 1883 (aged 74) Westminster, Maryland, U.S.
- Resting place: St. John's Church; Westminster, Maryland, U.S.
- Party: Whig; Democratic
- Spouse: Jane
- Children: 4
- Education: University of Maryland School of Medicine
- Occupation: Politician; physician

Francis Butler (April 13, 1809 – May 31, 1883) was an American politician and physician from Maryland. He served as a member of the Maryland House of Delegates, representing Harford County in 1842.

== Early life ==
Francis Butler was born on April 13, 1809, in Harford County, Maryland, to Jane (née McAtee) and Thomas Butler. He was educated at Archer's Academy near Bel Air. He studied medicine with James Montgomery. He graduated from the University of Maryland School of Medicine in 1834.

== Career ==
After graduating, Butler formed a partnership with James Montgomery. Their partnership only lasted two years before Montgomery's retirement. He practiced medicine in Harford County until 1856. He then practiced in Carroll County.

Butler was a Whig. Butler served as a member of the Maryland House of Delegates, representing Harford County in 1842. After the dissolution of the Whig Party, Butler became a Democrat.

== Personal life ==
Butler married Jane. They had two daughters and two sons, including Mrs. William B. Thomas, Mrs. John A. Macintosh and Matthews.

Butler lived in Harford County until 1856. He then lived at Clover Hill estate in Finksburg in Carroll County until 1865. He then moved to Westminster.

Butler was a Catholic and he was a member of St. John's Church in Westminster. Butler died on May 31, 1883, in Westminster. He was buried at St. John's Church.
