= Charles W. Famous =

American politician (1875–1938)

Member of the Maryland House of Delegates from the Harford County district
- In office 1912–1912 Serving with Thomas C. Hopkins and Henry A. Osborn Jr.

Personal details
- Born: March 16, 1875
- Died: October 17, 1938 (aged 63) Baltimore, Maryland, U.S.
- Resting place: Slate Ridge Cemetery
- Party: Republican
- Spouse: Annie W. Heaps
- Children: 1
- Education: University of Maryland
- Occupation: Politician; physician

Charles W. Famous (March 16, 1875 – October 17, 1938) was an American politician and physician from Maryland. He served as a member of the Maryland House of Delegates, representing Harford County in 1912.

== Early life ==
Charles W. Famous was born on March 16, 1875. He graduated from the University of Maryland in 1901.

== Career ==
After graduating, Famous started a medical practice in Street, Maryland, and worked there for 37 years.

Famous was a Republican. He served as a member of the Maryland House of Delegates, representing Harford County in 1912.

Famous was a director of Forest Hills State Bank.

== Personal life ==
Famous married Annie W. Heaps. They had one son, Curtis I.

Famous died on October 17, 1938, at Union Memorial Hospital in Baltimore. He was buried at Slate Ridge Cemetery.
