= John Carroll Walsh =

American politician (1816–1894)

Member of the Maryland Senate
- In office 1874–1876
- Preceded by: William B. Stephenson
- Succeeded by: Herman Stump
- Constituency: Harford County
- In office 1868
- Preceded by: William B. Stephenson
- Succeeded by: William B. Stephenson
- Constituency: Harford County

Personal details
- Born: December 22, 1816 Baltimore, Maryland, U.S.
- Died: December 1, 1894 (aged 77) near Jerusalem Mills, Maryland, U.S.
- Resting place: Green Mount Cemetery; Baltimore, Maryland, U.S.
- Party: Democratic
- Spouse: Amanda Lee
- Children: 3
- Education: Georgetown University
- Occupation: Politician; farmer

John Carroll Walsh (December 22, 1816 – December 1, 1894) was a politician and farmer from Baltimore. He served in the Maryland Senate in 1868 and from 1874 to 1876.

== Early life ==
John Carroll Walsh was born on December 22, 1816, in Baltimore to John Walsh. His father was an Irish immigrant and worked as a lumber dealer. Walsh was named after his father's friend, Archbishop John Carroll. At the age of 17, he moved to Fort Madison, Iowa, and purchased land in Iowa and Illinois. He remained in Iowa for four years. He graduated from Georgetown University and went west.

== Career ==
Walsh returned to Baltimore in 1840 and purchased "The Mound" and two other farms on Gunpowder River. He worked as a farmer.

Walsh was a Democrat. In 1864, Walsh became a member of the Democratic State Central Committee. In February 1866, Walsh was a member of a convention of Maryland representatives asking the state legislature to appeal or modify voter registration laws for people with Southern sympathies. Walsh served in the Maryland Senate, representing Harford County, in 1868 and again from 1874 to 1876. He served as president pro tempore of the senate in 1876. He was appointed to the Governor's staff and received the title of colonel for his service.

Walsh was a director of the Baltimore and Ohio Railroad. He helped found and served as a trustee of the Maryland Agricultural College. At one point, he worked with John Cox as an editor of The Aegis. He also served as president of the Mutual Fire Insurance Company of Harford County.

== Personal life ==
Walsh married Amanda Lee, daughter of Ralph Lee, of Harford County, Maryland. His wife predeceased him. They had three children, Ralph Lee, Harold and Mary Alice. He was a member of the Catholic Church.

Walsh died on December 1, 1894, at his "The Mound" home near Jerusalem Mills, Maryland. He was buried at Green Mount Cemetery in Baltimore.
