= Hippodrome Theatre (Baltimore) =

Historic theater in Maryland, USA

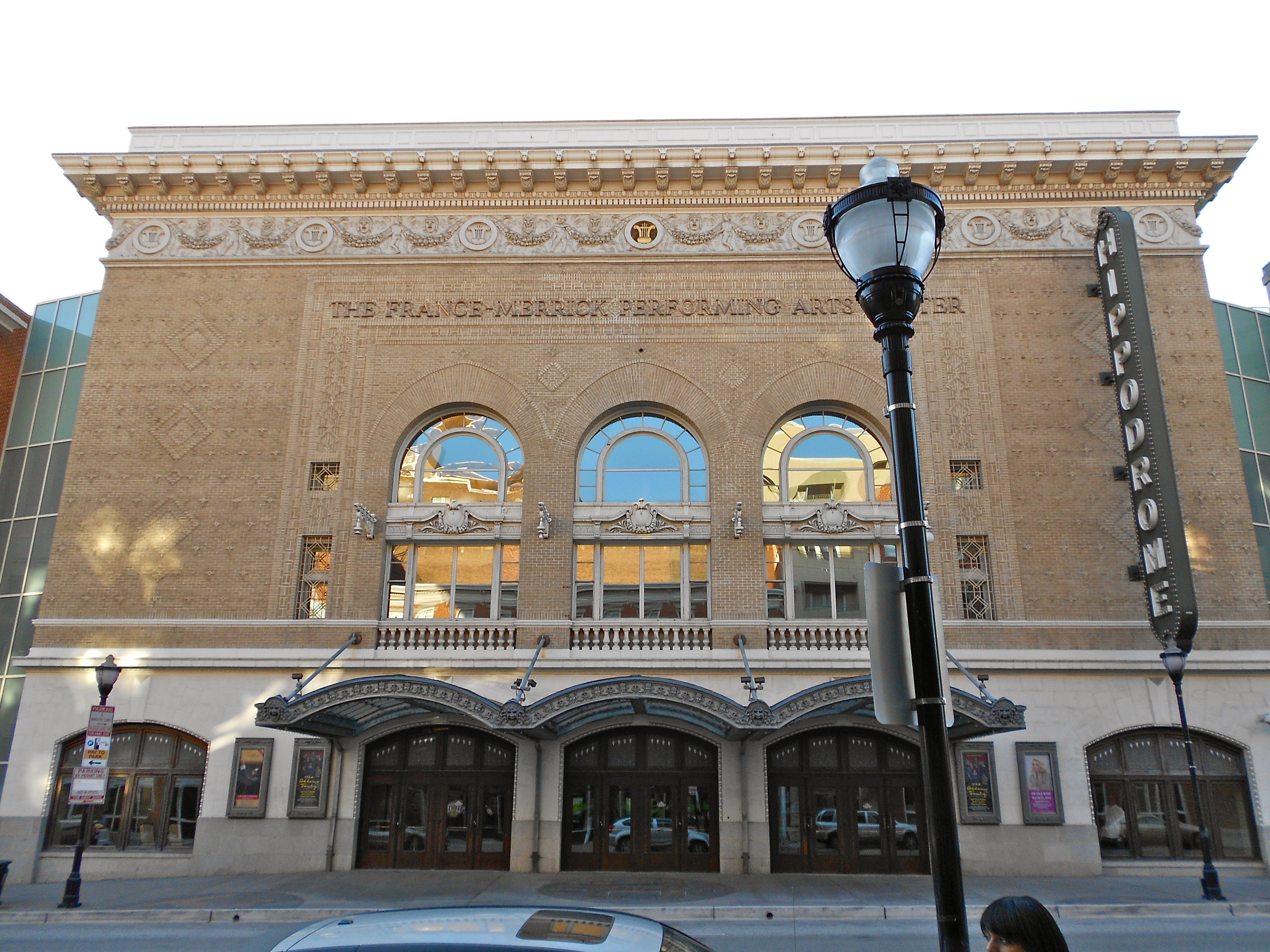
- Interactive map of Hippodrome Theatre
- Address: 12 N. Eutaw St. Baltimore, Maryland
- Owner: Maryland Stadium Authority
- Operator: Broadway Across America
- Capacity: 2,300
- Public transit: Baltimore Arena

Construction
- Opened: 1914
- Rebuilt: 2004
- Architect: Thomas W. Lamb

Website
- www.baltimorehippodrome.com
- Hippodrome Theatre
- U.S. National Register of Historic Places
- Coordinates: 39°17′23″N 76°37′17″W
- Area: 0.4 acres (0.16 ha)
- Built: 1914
- Architects: Lamb, Thomas White; Singer-Pentz Construction Co.
- Architectural style: Beaux Arts
- NRHP reference No.: 99001670
- Added to NRHP: January 14, 2000

The Hippodrome Theatre is a theater in Baltimore, Maryland.

== History ==
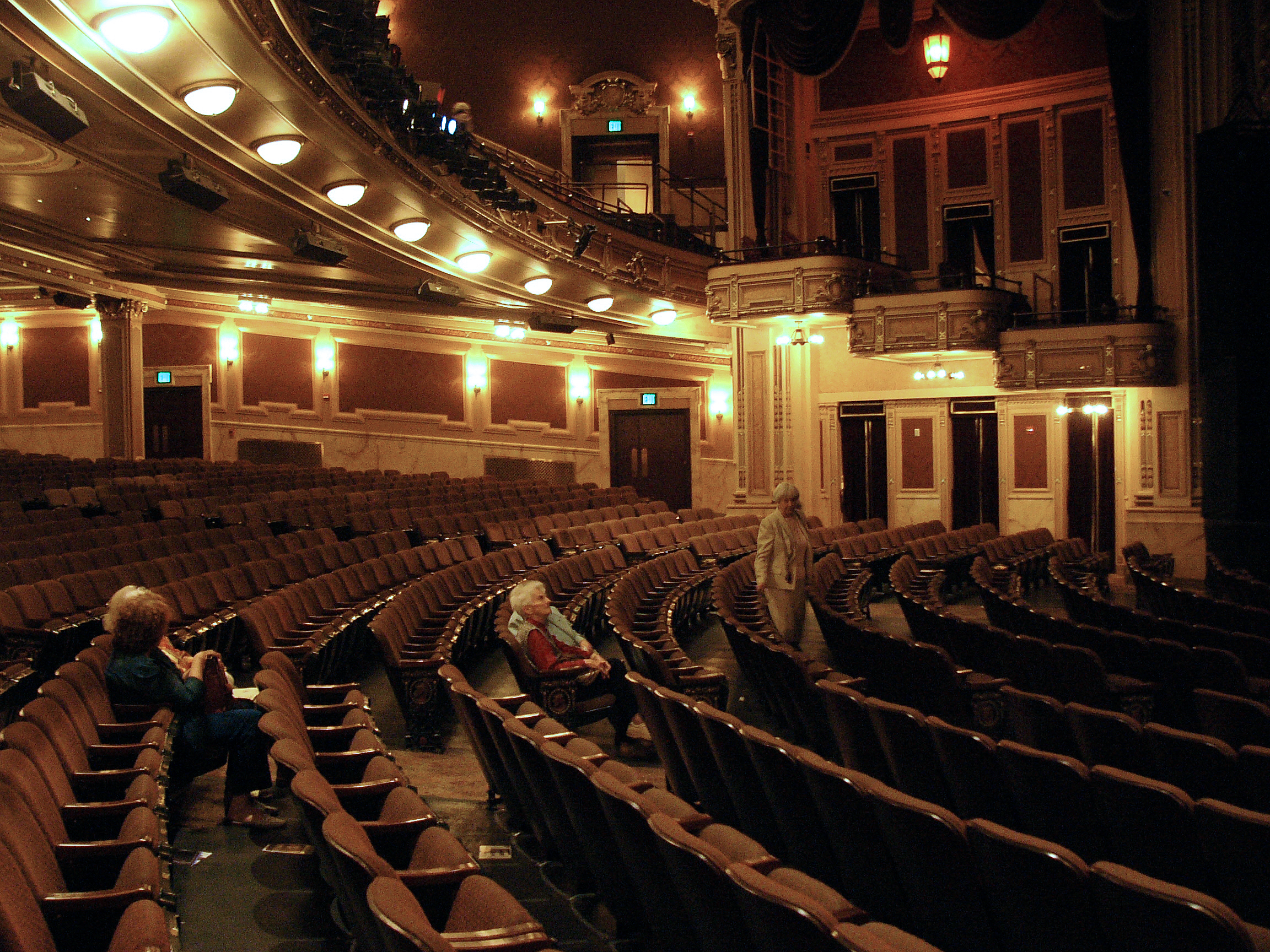
Interior of the theater after its renovation in 2004

Built in 1914 for impresarios Marion Scott Pearce and Scheck, the 2300-seat theater was the foremost vaudeville house in Baltimore, as well as a movie theater. When the movie palace opened, it was the largest theatre in the United States south of Philadelphia. The Hippodrome was designed by Thomas W. Lamb, one of the foremost theater architects of his time. Lamb gave the theater an unusually strong presence on Eutaw Street through the use of brick and terra cotta on a massive façade. The Hippodrome was renovated in 2004 for use as a performing arts theater, and is part of the France-Merrick Performing Arts Center.

The site had previously been occupied by the five story House Hotel, built in 1835 and destroyed by fire on May 25, 1912. The new theater had an original capacity of 3,000 seats and boasted a Moller organ, as well as a house orchestra that survived into the 1950s. The Loew's chain operated the Hippodrome from 1917 to 1924, then Keith-Albee-Orpheum assumed stewardship. In 1920 the average weekly attendance was 30,000. During the 1930s the Hippodrome featured such performers as Jack Benny, Milton Berle, Bob Hope, Martha Raye, Dinah Shore, Red Skelton, Billie Holiday, The Three Stooges, the Andrews Sisters, Morey Amsterdam, and Benny Goodman. Frank Sinatra first performed with Harry James’ band at the Hippodrome. Live performances ceased in 1959, but movies remained strong through the 1960s. The Hippodrome finally closed in 1990 as the last movie theater in downtown Baltimore.

In the period before it was renovated, it served as a filming location in the 2000 John Waters film Cecil B. Demented. The theater served as a hideout for the SprocketHoles, a gang of terrorist filmmakers.

=== Renovations ===
The most recent renovation combined three contiguous existing buildings and a new structure: the Western National Bank Building (1887), the Eutaw Savings Bank Building (1888) and the Hippodrome into a major performing arts complex, designed by Hardy Holzman Pfeiffer Associates. The Maryland Stadium Authority led the renovation. Clear Channel Entertainment (now Live Nation) became the theatre operator after project completion. In 2008, Live Nation sold most of its theatrical assets, including the Hippodrome, to Key Brand Entertainment.

Preceded by Kodak Theatre	Miss USA Venue; 2005-2006	Succeeded by Kodak Theatre
