= The Aegis =

The Aegis may refer to:

- The Aegis (newspaper) - a local newspaper for Harford County, Maryland, USA
- Aegis (newspaper) - a high school newspaper in Oakland, California
