= Baltimore Equitable Society =

Historic bank building in Maryland, USA

- Baltimore Equitable Insurance
- U.S. National Register of Historic Places
- Baltimore City Landmark
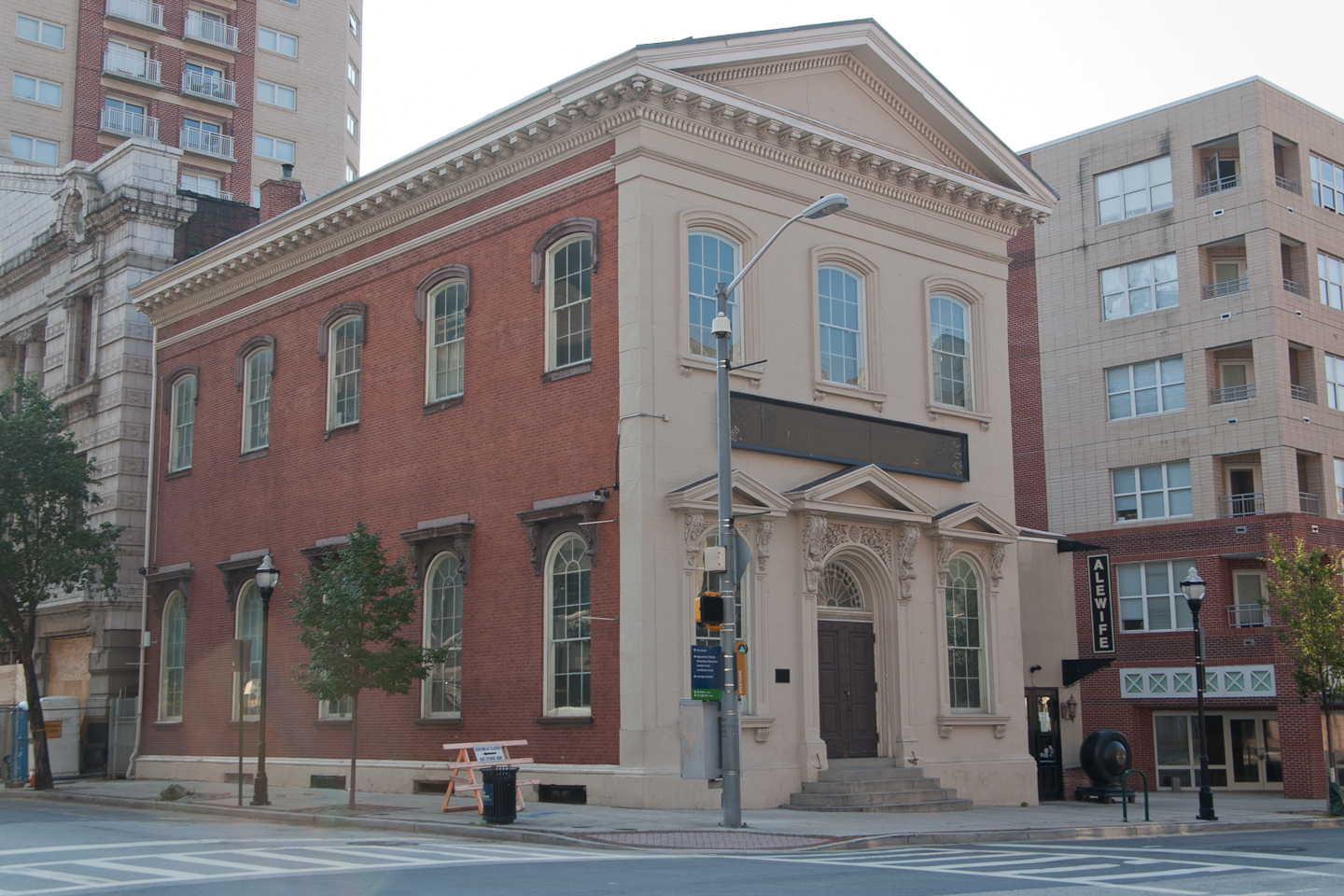
- Old location of Baltimore Equitable Insurance, relocated in 2003.
- Interactive map of Baltimore Equitable Insurance
- Location: 21 N Eutaw St, Baltimore, Maryland
- Coordinates: 39°17′25″N 76°37′14.8″W
- Area: 0.5 acres (0.20 ha)
- Built: 1962
- Architect: Ludwig Mies Van Der Rohe
- Architectural style: Modernistic
- NRHP reference No.: 77001528
- Designated BCL: 2012

Baltimore Equitable Insurance also known as the Baltimore Equitable Society, or the Baltimore Equitable Society for Insuring Houses from Loss by Fire, until 2003 was located at the original headquarters of the Eutaw Savings Bank, is a historic bank building located at Baltimore, Maryland, United States. Originally built as the headquarters for the Eutaw Savings Bank, it is a two-story building with brownstone front and brick sides. It was constructed in 1857 in the Italian Renaissance style. The Eutaw Savings Bank moved across the street in 1887 to what is now the Baltimore Grand and the building was acquired by the Baltimore Equitable Society in 1889. Founded in 1794, the Baltimore Equitable Society is one of the oldest corporations in the city and the third-oldest fire insurance company in the United States.

The building that housed Baltimore Equitable Insurance was listed on the National Register of Historic Places in 1977. In 2003, due to the age and state of disrepair of the building, Baltimore Equitable Insurance left the building, moving to a high-rise lease in the central business district at 100 N. Charles St. Suite 640. As of 2023, the previous location at 21 N Eutaw St. will become the M&T Pavilion, an entertainment space. In 2023, Baltimore Equitable Insurance changed offices again, moving to their current location in the Harbor East neighborhood. That location is in the former Bagby Furniture Company building at 509 S. Exeter St., Suite 420.

== Fire mark ==
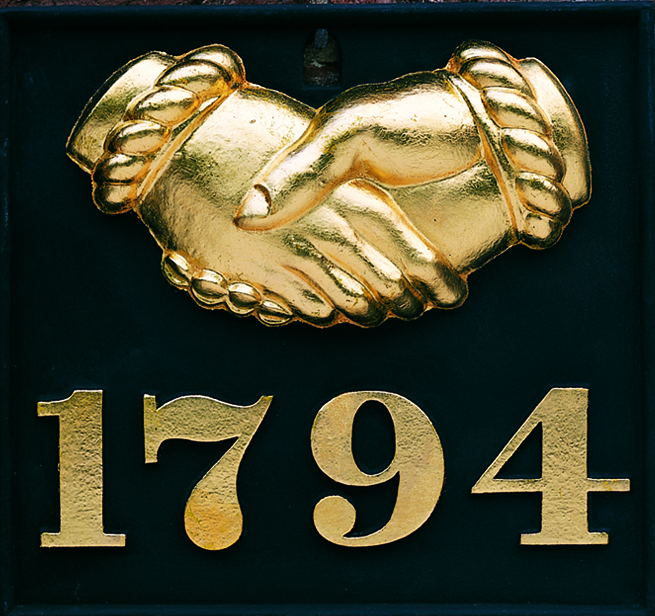
This a photo of the Baltimore Equitable Insurance firemark.

The Sign of the Clasped Hands, frequently seen on the exterior of houses in the region, means that the home is (or was) insured by the Baltimore Equitable Society (Baltimore Equitable Insurance). The Society chose the clasped hands, depicting the hand of the company and the hand of the policy holder shaking, to symbolize the agreement by both parties to the contract of insurance. Called a “fire mark,” this sign of coverage was once just as important as the paper policy document. The society still gives the fire mark to any person insured with Baltimore Equitable who wishes to receive it. It is numbered and painted in the traditional black with gold leaf.

== History ==
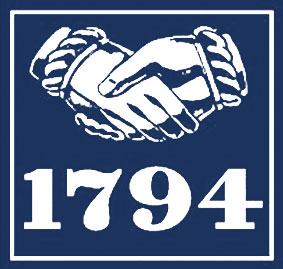
Baltimore Equitable Insurance Logo

On January 21, 1794, a number of respectable citizens assembled to establish a fire insurance company similar to that created in Philadelphia by Benjamin Franklin. This meeting gave rise to the birth of the Baltimore Equitable Society.

By February 10, 1794, a constitution had been drawn to govern the new company, the Baltimore Equitable Society for Insuring of Houses From Loss By Fire. Policy Number 1 was issued on April 10, 1794, to Humphrey Pierce on his three-story brick house on Baltimore Street. By December 27 of its first year of operation, the Society was incorporated, making it older than Baltimore City itself, which was not incorporated until three years later.

At the conclusion of the Society's first year of business, 104 policies had been written for a total coverage of $129,016. Expenses for the first year of Society business equaled $300.69 including salaries and rent. Detailed accounts were kept, noting charges of $1.33 for a pewter ink stand and $.50 for 50 quills.

Nearly two years after incorporation, on December 4, 1796, the Society sustained its first loss from fire when William Hawkins' two brick houses at Light and Baltimore Streets (now the site of the Nations Bank Building) were destroyed. The blaze consumed a number of other businesses, homes and a church in what amounted to the city's "Great Fire" to that date. With this first loss, began the Society's tradition of prompt and full payment to the policyholder.

Baltimore Equitable insured the property of a number of the city's prominent citizens. In 1803, Charles Carroll of Carrollton, a signer of the Declaration of Independence, insured four brick buildings on the north side of King George Street (now Lombard) between Stillhouse Street (now Front) and Jones' Falls. In 1838, Homewood the home of Charles Carroll Jr. now on the Johns Hopkins University campus, was first insured. When the owner cancelled this policy in 1866, the Society refunded the entire original payment. Then in 1903, when Johns Hopkins University acquired the mansion, the university insured it again.

The Society was an eyewitness to the tumultuous times which the nineteenth century presented to the nation. In 1814, the British burned Washington and turned toward Baltimore where they intended to do the same. Francis Scott Key watched the bombardment of Fort McHenry from the harbor where he penned the poem which became our national anthem. Six months after the British forces were defeated at the Battle of Baltimore and the city had been spared the destruction it had feared, the Society expressed its relief. The minutes recorded at its annual meeting on April 3, 1815, noted, "Peace and the restoration of tranquility...(leave) the board the opportunity and satisfaction to record... that there was no loss sustained." Had the British been successful in their land and sea attacks on Baltimore, the minutes would have told of a very different outcome.

While the 1860s saw life in Baltimore altered, the period also brought change to the Baltimore Equitable Society. On March 13, 1865, the members present at a general meeting voted to issue perpetual policies. By this point in its history, through judicious investments and careful management, the Society had accumulated a surplus sufficient to enable it to write policies for an indefinite period. The first of these policies was issued to William Clagett on his dwelling at 157 Lombard Street near Canal Street. On March 20, another perpetual policy was issued to cover "Mondawmin," the home of Isabella Brown, widow of George Brown. George was the son of Alexander Brown, founder of Alex. Brown & Sons, the city's oldest banking house. The home, originally a summer home and later the year-round residence, was located where Mondawmin Shopping Center now stands.

The turn of the century was a time of progress and good fortune for the Society until disaster struck the city in 1904. On February 7, a wholesale dry goods house in the heart of Baltimore's business district caught fire, igniting the Great Baltimore Fire. One hundred fifty acres, including all of the original town laid out in 1730, were destroyed along with 2,500 business establishments. Miraculously, there were no deaths, but total damages reached $150 million. The Great Baltimore Fire affected 455 Baltimore Equitable policyholders and although the Society incurred losses of nearly $2 million, all policy holders were promptly paid in full.

Following the disaster of the 1904 fire, financial calamity hit the nation. From 1929 to 1939, the Great Depression took a heavy toll on the country. Franklin D. Roosevelt was elected president to lead the nation to economic recovery. During this period, fortunes were lost, companies were ruined and millions of workers were unemployed. Nevertheless, Baltimore Equitable continued to be successful. None of its surplus fund was used to pay operating expenses, and investments remained secure. In fact, assets increased by 23%. It was during this period of economic struggle that the Society created its Fire Museum, that was housed in its offices on Eutaw Street and has recently been closed.

The years from 1941 to 1945 saw thousands of Baltimoreans called to military duty in Europe and the Pacific Theater during World War II. Those service men and women who were insured by the Society went to war without the worry of annual premiums, knowing their families would be taken care of with prompt and personal claims service in the event of a loss.

The urban unrest in 1968 changed the way some insurance companies wrote policies. As a result of the fire damage caused by the riots, some insurers refused to cover properties within the city lines. Yet Baltimore Equitable continued to write policies on homes which met underwriting requirements without regard to the invisible "red line" which was said to surround the city.

== Today ==
Throughout the 1980s, Baltimore Equitable's success continued. A.M. Best Company, which evaluates the financial stability of insurance companies, has rated Baltimore Equitable Society A - Excellent.
