= Thomas C. Hopkins =

American politician (died 1948)

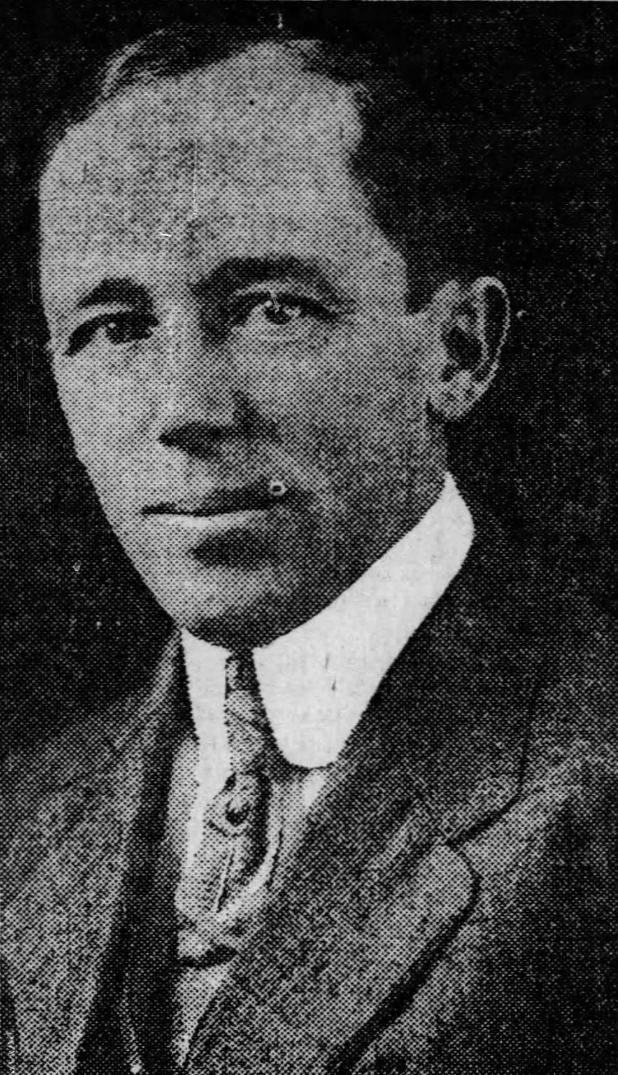
- Hopkins (c. 1911)

Member of the Maryland House of Delegates from the Harford County district
- In office 1912–1914 Serving with Charles W. Famous, Henry A. Osborn Jr., Charles H. McNabb, Noble L. Mitchell

Personal details
- Died: May 5, 1948 Havre de Grace, Maryland, U.S.
- Resting place: Darlington Cemetery; Darlington, Maryland, U.S.
- Party: Democratic
- Spouse: Marie M. LeGare
- Relatives: Thomas Chew Hopkins (grandfather)
- Occupation: Politician

Thomas C. Hopkins (died May 5, 1948) was an American politician from Maryland. He served as a member of the Maryland House of Delegates, representing Harford County, from 1912 to 1914.

== Early life ==
Thomas C. Hopkins was born to Cassandra Lee (née Grover) and W. Worthington Hopkins. His father was a physician. His grandfather was Thomas Chew Hopkins, a member of the Maryland House of Delegates in 1843 and 1865.

== Career ==
Hopkins was a Democrat. He served as a member of the Maryland House of Delegates, representing Harford County, from 1912 to 1914. Hopkins ran for re-election in 1915, but was defeated by Thomas H. Ward by a margin of 10 votes. Hopkins contested the election, but was unsuccessful in his case.

== Personal life ==
Hopkins married Marie M. LeGare. Hopkins lived at Gover's Hill in Havre de Grace, Maryland.

Hopkins died on May 5, 1948, at his home, the Repulta Farm in Govers Hill Road in Havre de Grace. He was buried at Darlington Cemetery.
