= William M. Elliott =

American politician (died 1882)

Member of the Maryland House of Delegates from the Harford County district
- In office 1854–1854 Serving with Stevenson Archer and George Stephenson

Personal details
- Born: c. 1811
- Died: September 20, 1882 (aged 71) Charles County, Maryland, U.S.
- Resting place: Grove Cemetery; Aberdeen, Maryland, U.S.
- Party: Democratic
- Children: 5
- Occupation: Politician; businessman

William M. Elliott (c. 1811 – September 20, 1882) was an American politician and businessman from Maryland. He served as a member of the Maryland House of Delegates, representing Harford County in 1854.

== Career ==
Elliott served as a member of the Maryland House of Delegates, representing Harford County in 1854. He was elected as county commissioner in 1871. He was a Democrat.

Elliott built a large canning factory in Charles County and ran the business with his son Howell. He also worked in the fishing industry on the Potomac River for 25 years.

== Personal life ==
Elliott married and had four daughters and one son, Mrs. Jacob C. Hollis, Mrs. George F. Walker, Mrs. John Cooley, Missouri and Howell B. Elliott had a home in Havre de Grace.

Elliott died on September 20, 1882, at the age of 71, at his farm in Charles County. He was buried at Grove Cemetery in Aberdeen.
