= Joseph S. Whiteford =

American politician (1859–1923)

- In office 1908–1909 Serving with Martin L. Jarrett, Harry C. Lawder, Walter R. McComas
- Constituency: Harford County

Personal details
- Born: October 1859 near Whiteford, Maryland, U.S.
- Died: January 29, 1923 (aged 63) near Delta, Pennsylvania, U.S.
- Resting place: Slateville Cemetery
- Party: Democratic
- Children: 2
- Occupation: Politician; farmer; canner

Joseph S. Whiteford (October 1859 – January 29, 1923) was an American politician from Maryland. He served as a member of the Maryland House of Delegates, representing Harford County, from 1908 to 1909.

== Early life ==
Joseph S. Whiteford was born in October 1859 near Whiteford, Maryland, to Elizabeth Whiteford.

== Career ==
Whiteford ran a dairy farm and worked in the canning industry.

Whiteford was a Democrat. He served as a member of the Maryland House of Delegates, representing Harford County, from 1908 to 1909.

== Personal life ==
Whiteford married the daughter of Foulk Jones around 1884. They had two sons, Roger and Guy.

In 1916, Whiteford was arrested for an automobile crash into a street car, but the charges were dismissed. He died of pneumonia on January 29, 1923, near Delta, Pennsylvania. He was buried in Slateville Cemetery.
