= Thomas Chew Hopkins =

American politician and physician (1808–1876)

Member of the Maryland House of Delegates from the Harford County district
- In office 1865–1866 Serving with Isaac Cairnes, Henry A. Silver, Joshua Wilson
- In office 1842–1843 Serving with Francis Butler, Luther M. Jarrett, Coleman Yellott, William J. Polk, William B. Stephenson

Personal details
- Born: 1808 near Darlington, Maryland, U.S.
- Died: October 12, 1876 (aged 67–68) Havre de Grace, Maryland, U.S.
- Spouse: Priscilla Worthington (m. 1834)
- Children: J. T. C. Hopkins
- Relatives: Thomas C. Hopkins (grandson)
- Education: University of Maryland School of Medicine (MD)
- Occupation: Politician; physician

Thomas Chew Hopkins (1808 – October 12, 1876) was an American politician and medical doctor from Maryland. He served as a member of the Maryland House of Delegates, representing Harford County from 1842 to 1843 and from 1865 to 1866.

== Early life ==
Thomas Chew Hopkins was born in 1808 near Darlington, Maryland. He studied medicine under Dr. Robert Allen of Cecil County. Hopkins graduated as a member of the 1829–30 class of the University of Maryland School of Medicine with a Doctor of Medicine.

== Career ==
Hopkins practiced medicine in Cecil County for about a year and then moved his practice to Harford County, and practiced in Havre de Grace for most of the remainder of his life. He was a member of the Medical Society of Harford County.

Hopkins served as a member of the Maryland House of Delegates, representing Harford County from 1842 to 1843 and from 1865 to 1866.

Hopkins helped organize the Havre de Grace Bank in 1841. Hopkins was a member of the Harford County school board in 1868.

== Personal life ==
Hopkins married Priscilla Worthington in 1834 and had children, including D. W., Ellen and J. T. C. Hopkins. His grandson was Thomas C. Hopkins, who also served in the Maryland House of Delegates.

Hopkins died of typhoid fever on October 12, 1876, at his home in Havre de Grace.
