= William B. Stephenson =

American politician (1802–1884)

Member of the Maryland Senate
- In office 1870–1872
- Preceded by: John Carroll Walsh
- Succeeded by: John Carroll Walsh
- Constituency: Harford County
- In office 1865–1867
- Preceded by: William F. Bayless
- Succeeded by: John Carroll Walsh
- Constituency: Harford County

Member of the Maryland House of Delegates from the Harford County district
- In office 1852–1853 Serving with Alfred W. Bateman and Thomas Hope
- In office 1845–1846 Serving with Benedict H. Hanson, Henry H. Johns, Abraham J. Streett, Abraham Cole, Robert W. Holland, Luther M. Jarrett
- In office 1843–1843 Serving with Thomas Chew Hopkins, William J. Polk, Coleman Yellott

Personal details
- Born: June 16, 1802 Harford County, Maryland, U.S.
- Died: February 13, 1884 (aged 81) Rock Run, Harford County, Maryland, U.S.
- Resting place: Rock Run United Methodist Church; Harford County, Maryland, U.S.
- Party: Whig; Democratic
- Relatives: George Stephenson (brother)
- Occupation: Politician; judge; lawyer; farmer

William B. Stephenson (June 16, 1802 – February 13, 1884) was an American politician and judge from Maryland. He served in the Maryland House of Delegates and Maryland Senate.

== Early life ==
William B. Stephenson was born on June 16, 1802, in Harford County, Maryland, to Priscilla (or Mary) (née Hopkins) and James Stephenson. His father was a slaveholder, served in the War of 1812, and was a hotelier in Perryville, Maryland. His brother was George Stephenson.

== Career ==
Stephenson was a Whig, but changed to the Democratic Party during President Jackson's second campaign. He started his political career in 1830. In 1830, Stephenson was elected to the Harford County Levy Court. Stephenson served as a member of the Maryland House of Delegates, representing Harford County, in 1843, 1845 to 1846 and 1852 to 1853. He served as a member of the Maryland Senate, representing Harford County from 1865 to 1867 and from 1870 to 1872. He was succeeded by John Carroll Walsh.

Stephenson was a lawyer and owned a farm of 300 acres in Harford County. He also served as a colonel in the militia.

== Personal life ==
Stephenson married and had no children. His wife predeceased him. He bequeathed his farm to his adopted daughter, Elizabeth, who married state delegate William B. Hopkins.

Stephenson died on February 13, 1884, at his home near Rock Run in Harford County, Maryland. He was buried at Rock Run United Methodist Church.
