= John Hawkins (Maryland politician) =

American politician

Member of the Maryland House of Delegates from the Harford County district
- In office 1849–1849 Serving with Abraham Cole, Henry D. Farnandis, Hugh C. Whiteford
- Preceded by: Luther M. Jarrett

Personal details
- Occupation: Politician

John Hawkins was an American politician from Maryland. He served as a member of the Maryland House of Delegates, representing Harford County in 1849.

== Career ==
Hawkins served as a member of the Maryland House of Delegates, representing Harford County in 1849.
