= Luther M. Jarrett =

American politician (1804–1854)

Member of the Maryland House of Delegates from the Harford County district
- In office 1846–1847 Serving with Abraham Cole, Henry D. Farnandis, Hugh C. Whiteford, Robert W. Holland, William B. Stephenson
- Succeeded by: John Hawkins
- In office 1842–1842 Serving with Francis Butler, Thomas C. Hopkins, Coleman Yellott

Personal details
- Born: 1804 Harford County, Maryland, U.S.
- Died: June 7, 1854 (aged 49–50)
- Party: Democratic
- Spouse: Julia Anne Scarff (m. 1830)
- Children: 7, including James H. and Martin L.
- Occupation: Politician; farmer; merchant
- Known for: namesake of Jarrettsville, Maryland

Luther M. Jarrett (1804 – June 7, 1854) was an American politician from Maryland. He served as a member of the Maryland House of Delegates, representing Harford County in 1842 and from 1846 to 1847. He was the namesake of Jarrettsville, Maryland.

== Early life ==
Luther M. Jarrett was born in 1804 in Harford County, Maryland, to Jesse Jarrett. His father was a farmer. Jarrett grew up on a plot of land called My Lady's Manor tract. The land was allotted to the Jarretts by Maryland colonial governor Robert Eden.

== Career ==
Jarrett worked as a farmer and merchant. Around 1837, Jarrett plotted Jarrettsville and the village was named in his honor.

Jarrett served as a member of the Maryland House of Delegates, representing Harford County in 1842 and from 1846 to 1847. He was a Democrat.

Jarrett built the Harford Hunt Club (later the Elkridge-Harford Hunt Club).

== Personal life ==
In 1835, Jarrett bought 300 acres of a piece of land called Upper Nodd Forest in Carmon (later Jarrettsville). Jarrett and his mother lived at an old hotel or tavern at the crossroads near present-day Jarrettsville. The crossroads is known as "Four Corners" and was located at the corner of Baldwin Mill Road and Jarrettsville Road. In 1842, he built a brick mansion called Jarrett Manor and corner store on the land. The mansion was demolished in 1979.

Jarrett married Julia Ann(e) Scarff on March 3, 1830. They had six sons and one daughter, including James H., William B., Thomas B., Joshua W., Martin L. and Sarah E. His son James served as a state delegate and worked as a physician.

Jarrett died on June 7, 1854.
