= Xfinity Center (Maryland) =

Basketball arena in College Park, Maryland, U.S.

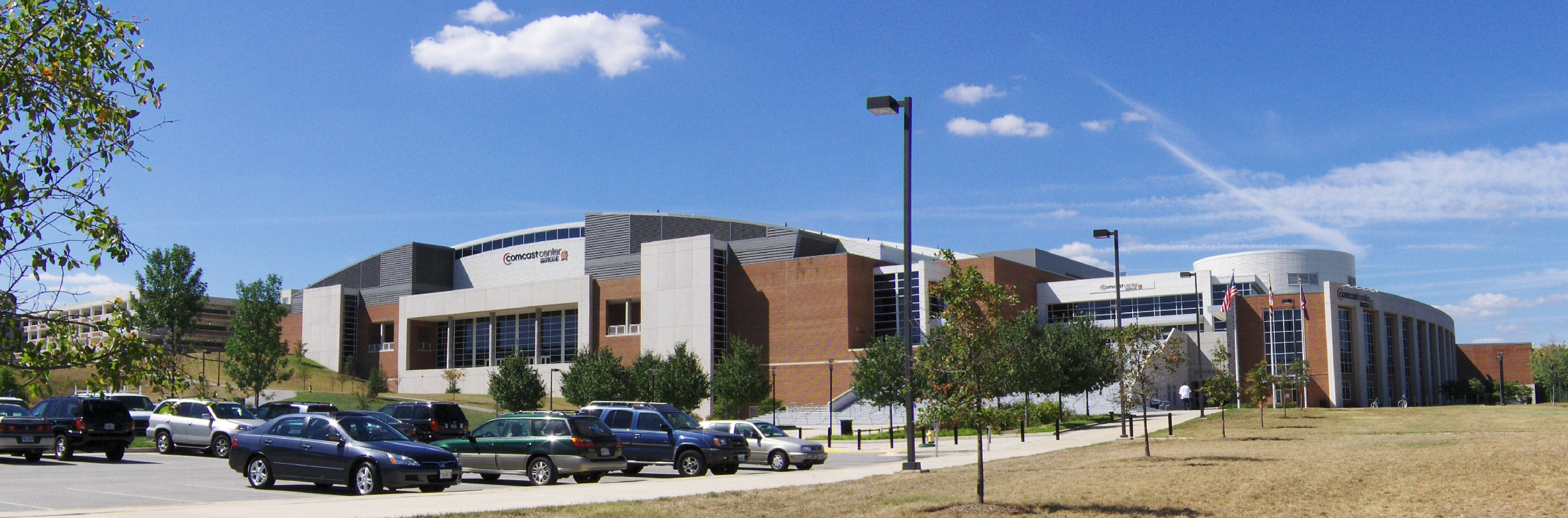
- Exterior of the arena (c.2006)
- Interactive map of Xfinity Center
- Former names: Comcast Center (2002–2014)
- Location: Paint Branch & Regents Dr; College Park, Maryland U.S.
- Coordinates: 38°59′43″N 76°56′29″W
- Owner: Maryland Stadium Authority
- Operator: Maryland Stadium Authority
- Capacity: 17,300
- Surface: Hardwood

Construction
- Groundbreaking: July 1, 2000
- Opened: October 11, 2002
- Cost: US$125 million ($224 million in 2025 dollars)
- Architects: Ellerbe Becket; Design Collective, Inc.
- Structural engineers: Delon Hampton & Associates
- General contractor: Gilbane/Smoot

Tenants
Maryland Terrapins men's basketball
Maryland Terrapins women's basketball
Maryland Terrapins volleyball
Maryland Terrapins wrestling (2002–present)
University of Maryland, College Park campus

Xfinity Center is the indoor arena and student activities center that serves as the home of the University of Maryland Terrapins men's and women's basketball teams in College Park, Maryland, United States. Ground was broken in May 2000 and construction was completed in October 2002 at a cost of $125 million. It replaced Cole Field House as the Terrapins' home court, which had served as the home of Maryland basketball since 1955.

The on-campus facility was originally named the Comcast Center after Comcast Corporation purchased a 20-year, $25 million corporate naming agreement when the arena opened in 2002. In July 2014, it was renamed Xfinity Center after Comcast's cable brand, Xfinity.

Xfinity Center, which has a capacity of 17,300, opened for Midnight Madness on October 11, 2002, and the first official men's game was a 64–49 victory over Miami University (Ohio) on November 24, 2002. In its first season, 281,057 fans visited to watch Terrapin basketball games for a per-game average of 17,566 as Maryland finished fifth in the nation in attendance. On January 25, 2012, the court was renamed in honor of Gary Williams, the men's basketball coach who retired the previous year.

Though Xfinity Center is the largest arena in the state of Maryland, it is the second-largest arena in the Washington, D.C. metropolitan area by seating capacity, just behind Capital One Arena in Washington, D.C., which has an official seating capacity of roughly 500 more than Xfinity Center. The facility is also used for concerts, graduation ceremonies including those for the University of Maryland, state high school basketball tournaments, and other special events. Concert seating capacity is nearly 19,000.

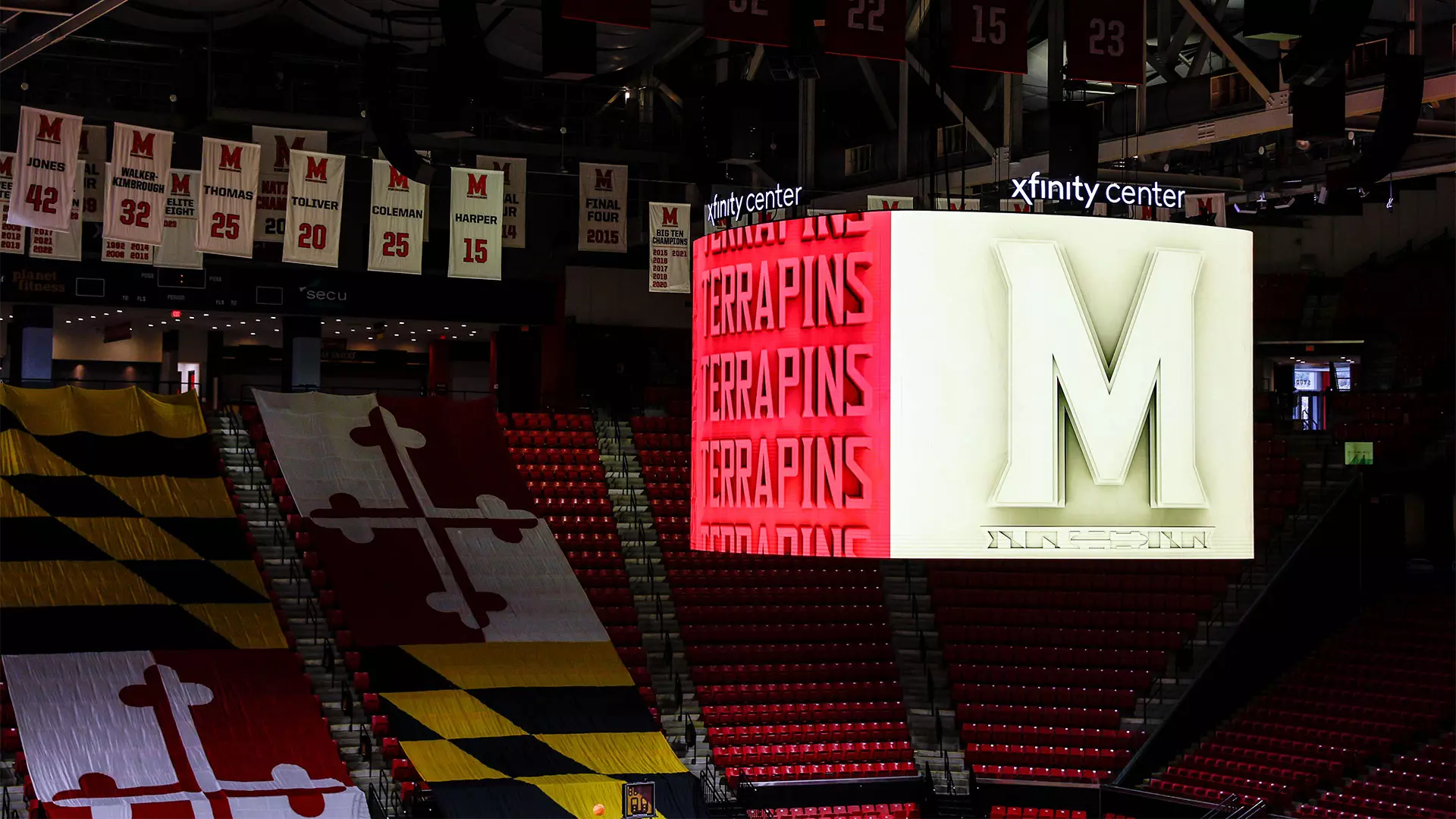
New Daktronics videoboard installed prior to the 2024–2025 season

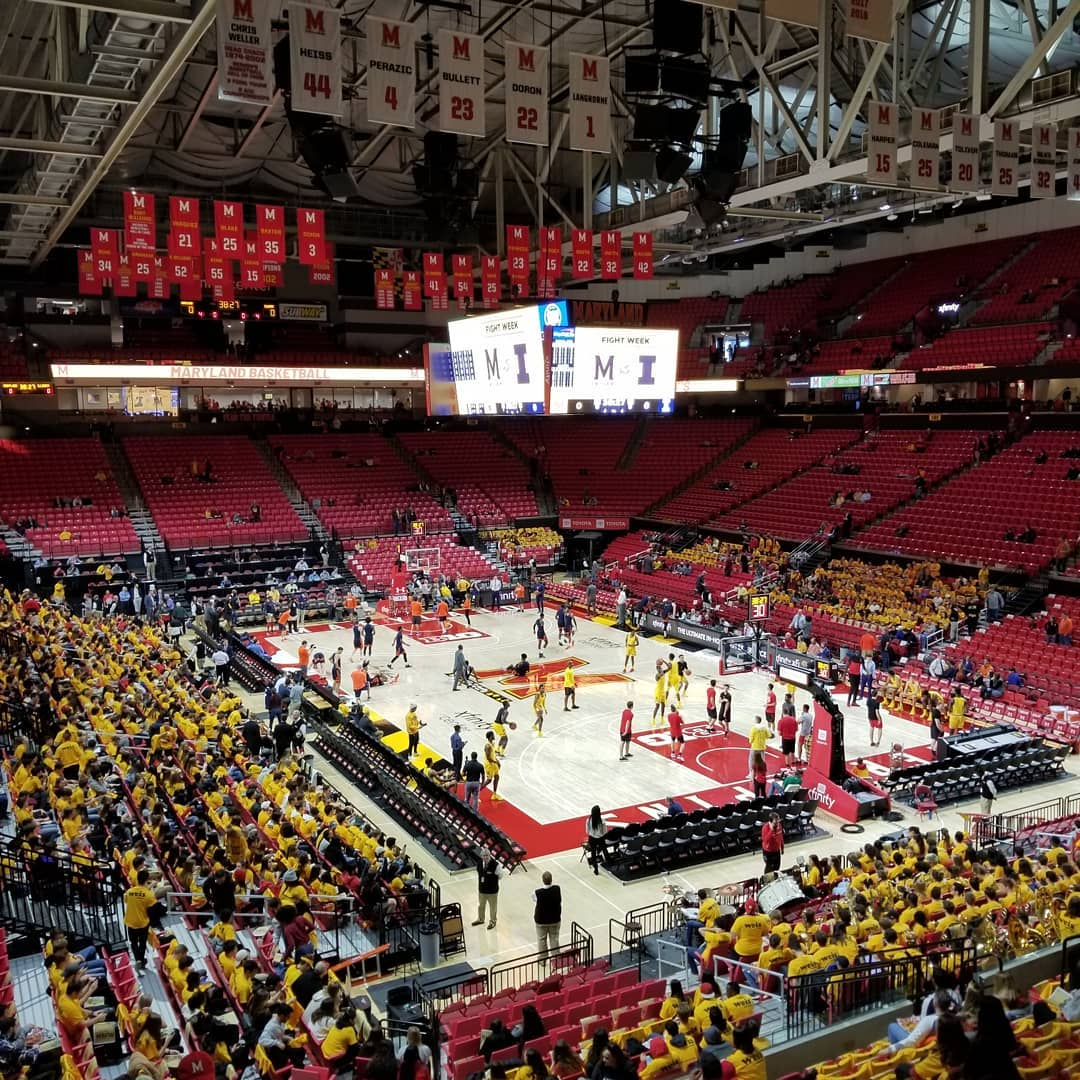
The Xfinity Center before a 2019 men's basketball game between Maryland and the University of Illinois.

== Amenities ==
In addition to the main basketball court, Xfinity Center also features a 1,500-seat gymnasium for volleyball, gymnastics, and wrestling, and a 7,000-square-foot (650 m^{2}) academic support center for student-athletes. The facility also holds Heritage Hall, a 400-seat multi-purpose room overlooking the arena's seating bowl equipped to host banquets, press conferences, meetings and serve as a pregame restaurant. The team's athletic store and university athletic offices are located in the facility as well. Inside the lobby on the east side of the facility is the Terrapin Walk of Fame and History, featuring many images of the past of Maryland athletics as well as the 2002 men's national championship trophy and the 2006 women's national championship trophy.

In 2014, the university replaced the building's original scoreboard with a new, start-of-the-art center hung Daktronics videoboard that features two side displays measuring approximately 12.5 feet (3.8 m) high by 33 feet (10 m) wide and two end displays measuring approximately 9 feet (2.7 m) high by 16.5 feet (5.0 m) wide making it one of the largest jumbotrons in college basketball. The videoboard can display one single image to show live video and replays, but can also be divided into separate windows to display graphics, animations, game statistics, scoring information and advertisements. The Xfinity Center also features four message displays in each corner of the facility that are used to display closed captioning.

== Student section ==
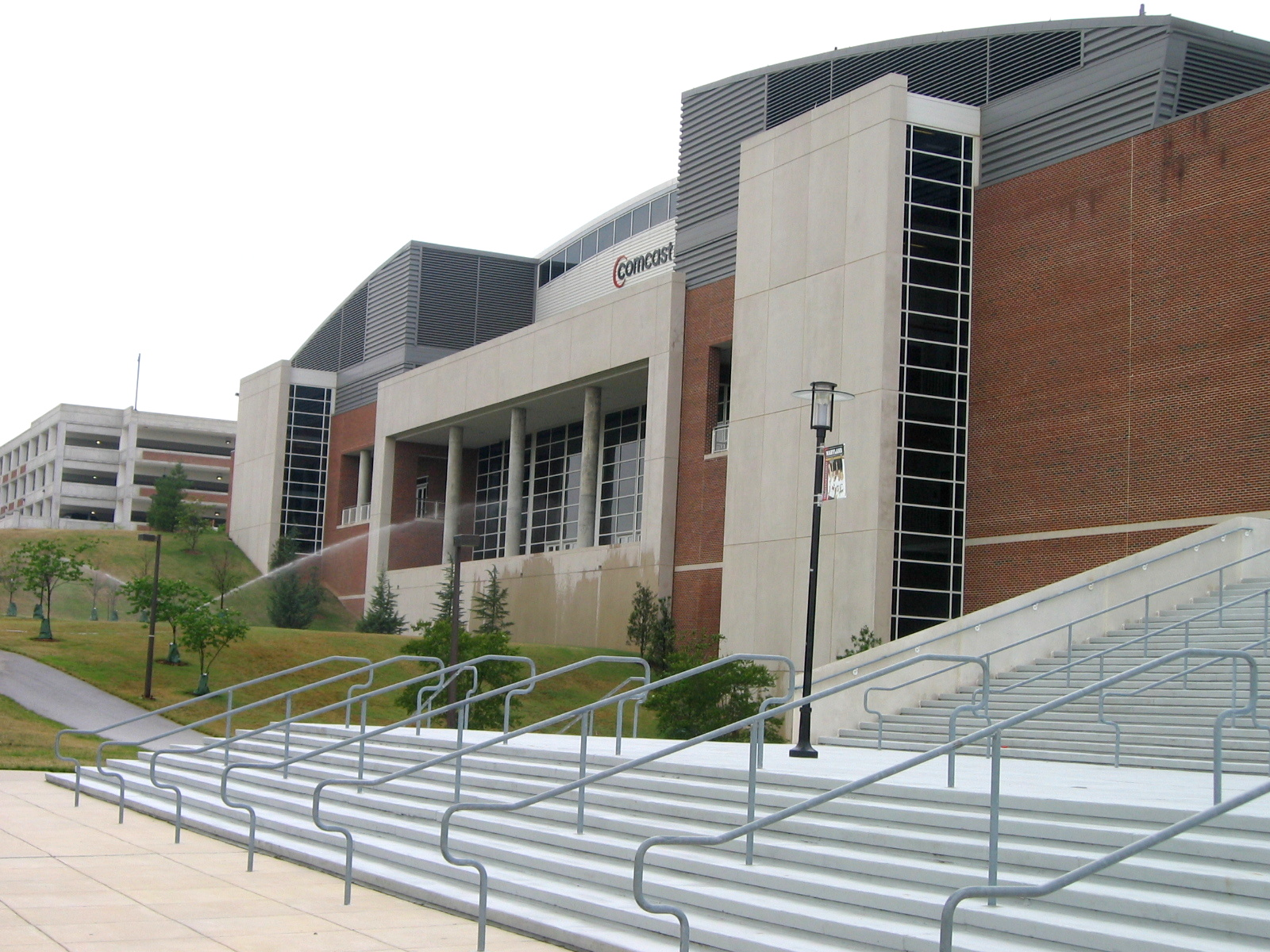
Exterior, Summer 2007

The student section contains 4,000 seats arranged in the first ten rows on all sides of the arena, among the largest student sections in the Big Ten. The most notable feature of the arena is the steeply pitched kop-style seating area at the west end of the arena behind the visiting team's second half basket, informally known as "the Wall." Originally designed to reduce excavation costs due to a hill, the area features 2,600 student seats meant to intimidate opposing players who shoot free throws in the second half. Maryland has long had a reputation for having one of the most raucous student sections in the nation for several years before Xfinity Center opened in 2002, and FanSided ranked Xfinity as the fifteenth-best college basketball atmosphere in 2018.

Because of the athletic department's online lottery system which distributes tickets to students, most games are student sell-outs. Student attendance is typically highest for conference games, non-conference games against top teams (such as the annual Big Ten-ACC Challenge), and the annual "Maryland Madness" event (formerly, though still colloquially, known as "Midnight Madness") held in October to signify the official start of the college basketball season. Attendance by students is generally lowest for early season exhibition and non-conference games, as well as games played while the students are on Thanksgiving and winter break.

== Notable games at Xfinity Center ==
- December 14, 2002 – In Maryland's debut game against a ranked opponent at the new arena, they fell to the #17 University of Florida Gators, 69–64. Despite a valiant effort, Maryland's inability to contain Anthony Roberson from behind the arc and shooting just 36% from the free throw line led to a less than auspicious christening of the facility against a ranked opponent.
- January 18, 2003 – The Terrapins defeated then undefeated #1 Duke, 87–72.
- February 17, 2003 – Due to a major snowstorm in the area, the game against #10 Wake Forest was postponed from the previous night. Since most ticket holders were unable to travel to College Park, the athletic department instituted an open attendance policy. Anyone with a valid student ID was given free admission and the general public was charged $20. The near-capacity crowd was composed mostly of students enjoying their snowday, and the Terrapins defeated the Demon Deacons, 90–67.
- February 22, 2004 – The third largest crowd to watch an Atlantic Coast Conference women's regular season basketball game and the second largest crowd to watch a women's game at the arena (13,346), went home disappointed as No. 4-ranked Duke defeated the Terrapins 72–59.

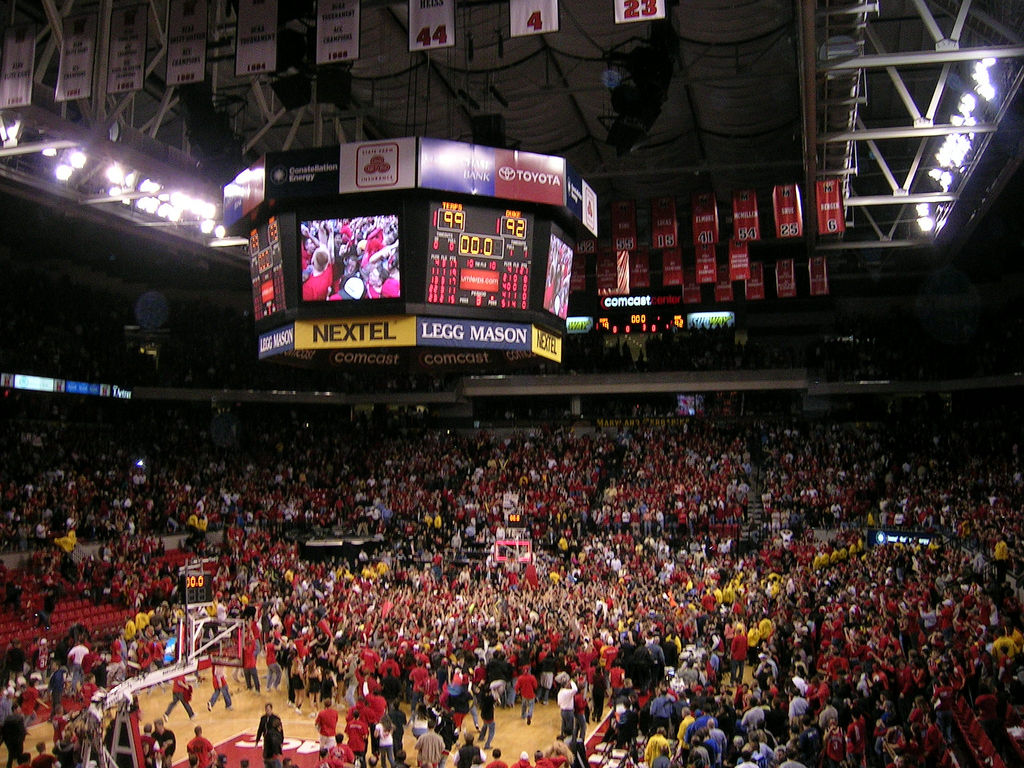
Fans storm the court after Maryland defeats seventh-ranked Duke in overtime on February 12, 2005.

- February 12, 2005 – The Terrapins won their third consecutive game against Duke and became first team to sweep the regular season series from the Blue Devils since Wake Forest did it during 1995–96 season. The 99–92 overtime thriller coincided with a visit from ESPN's College GameDay.
- February 13, 2005 – The No. 18-ranked women's team lost to No. 4-ranked Duke 60–49 in front of the largest crowd to watch an Atlantic Coast Conference women's regular season basketball game (17,243).
- March 20–22, 2005 – Comcast Center (as it was then known) hosted first- and second-round games for the NCAA women's basketball tournament. The No. 7-seeded Terps used their home court advantage to defeat 10-seed Wisconsin–Green Bay but lost to No. 2-seeded Ohio State. In the other games, Liberty became only the second 13-seed to advance to the Sweet 16 by upsetting fourth-seeded Penn State and fifth-seeded DePaul.
- February 7, 2006 – Maryland came from behind to beat Virginia, 76–65, to give Gary Williams 349 wins at Maryland, surpassing the record previously set by Charles "Lefty" Driesell.
- January 28, 2007 – The largest crowd in ACC women's history, 17,950, watched second ranked North Carolina defeat third-ranked Maryland 84–71, surpassing the record set the previous season.
- February 17, 2007 – Undefeated and No. 1 Duke women's team beat #6 Maryland on Senior Day 69–57 on only the second ever sold-out game for women's basketball at the Comcast Center.
- January 14, 2008 – The #4 Maryland women's team beat #10 Duke 85–70 at home for the first time in ten years. The crowd of 15,531 is the fifth largest in ACC women's basketball history.
- February 21, 2009 – Trailing by as many as 16 points, and still down by 9 with less than two minutes to go, unranked Maryland came back to beat #3 North Carolina 88–85 in overtime. Maryland fans rushed the court after the upset victory.
- March 3, 2010 -Led by first team All-American point guard Greivis Vasquez, the Maryland men's basketball team defeated #4 Duke 79–72. As a result of the 79–72 victory, the Terps would go on to share the ACC regular season championship with Duke.
- January 25, 2012 – The basketball court was named in honor of Gary Williams, the men's basketball coach who retired after the previous season. That night, the men's basketball team fell to Duke, 74–61.
- February 16, 2013 – Maryland Men's Basketball upsets #2 Duke in a thrilling 83–81 victory. This was the first victory for the Terps against the Blue Devils since 2010 and the first win against a top 3 ranked team since 2009. This also was the first victory against Duke for Mark Turgeon as the head coach for Maryland Basketball.
- March 9, 2014 - Maryland Men's Basketball Team took down longtime rival #5 Virginia 75–69 in overtime. This was the last home game for the Terrapins as a member of the ACC. Also it was the last home game with the Terp's venue being named the Comcast Center.
- February 24, 2015 - Maryland Men's Basketball Team upsets #5 Wisconsin 59–53.
- November 17, 2015 - Maryland Men's Basketball Team defeats the Georgetown Hoyas behind a 24-point performance from guard Melo Trimble. This game was considered a renewal of the old-school rivalry between these teams. It was the first time they had played since 1993.
- January 28, 2016 - First matchup featuring two top-ten ranked Men's Basketball teams in the history of the Xfinity Center. The #8 Maryland Terrapins defeated the #3 Iowa Hawkeyes 74–68 in front of a crowd of 17, 950 people.
- March 8, 2020 - #9 Maryland Men's Basketball Team defeated the #25 Michigan Wolverines 74–66, clinching a share of the 2019-20 Big Ten regular-season championship. It was the first Big Ten title for the men's basketball team in school history.
- February 16, 2023 - Maryland Men's Basketball Team upsets #3 Purdue 68-54 which was the first top 5 win at home since 2016 for the Terps.

== See also ==
- List of indoor arenas in the United States
- List of NCAA Division I basketball arenas
