= George Yellott =

American judge (1819–1902)

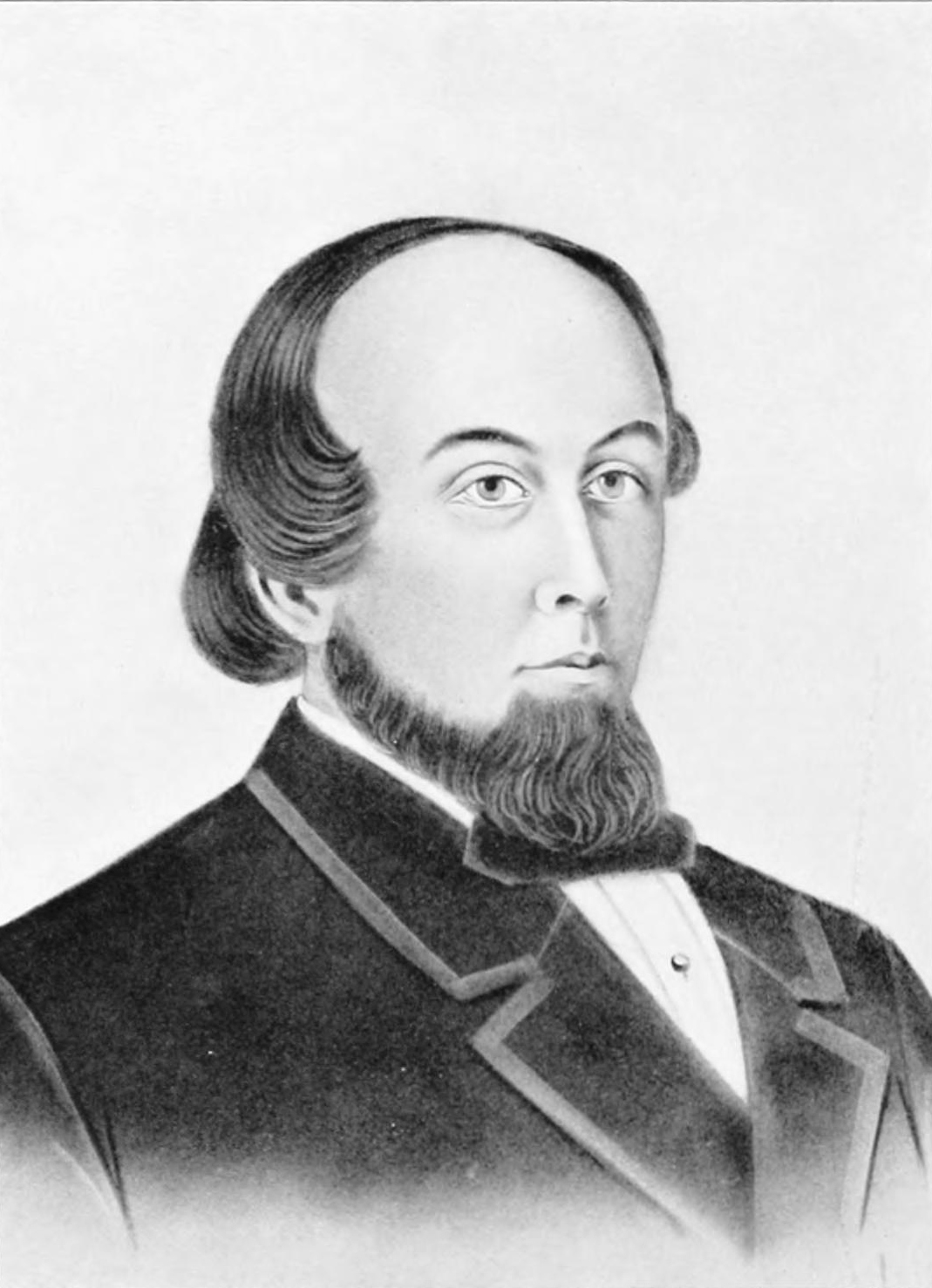

Judge of the Maryland Court of Appeals
- In office 1882–1889
- Preceded by: Frederick Stone
- Succeeded by: William Shepard Bryan

Member of the Maryland House of Delegates from the Harford County district
- In office 1844–1844 Serving with Frederick T. Amos, Henry W. Archer, William J. Polk

Personal details
- Born: July 19, 1819 Towson, Maryland, U.S.
- Died: November 13, 1902 (aged 83) Baltimore, Maryland, U.S.
- Party: Whig; Democratic
- Relatives: Coleman Yellott (brother)
- Education: Bristol Episcopal College (A.B.)
- Occupation: Politician; jurist; writer; newspaper publisher

George Yellott (July 19, 1819 – November 13, 1902) was an American politician and judge from Maryland. He served as a member of the Maryland House of Delegates, representing Harford County in 1844. He served as justice of the Maryland Court of Appeals from 1882 to 1889.

== Early life ==
George Yellott was born on July 19, 1819, in the Dulaney Valley, near Towson, in Baltimore County, Maryland to Rebecca Ridgeley (née Coleman) and Captain John Yellott. He was the last of eight children. His father was a captain of the Washington Troop cavalry in the War of 1812. His grandfather, John Yellott, came to America in 1782 from Pomfret, Yorkshire. He grew up on his father's estate in Dulaney Valley. He received an early education from an academy run by Reverend George Morrison. Yellott received a literary education at Bristol Episcopal College in Bristol, Pennsylvania. He graduated in 1838 with a Bachelor of Arts. Yellott studied law with Governor Augustus Bradford in Baltimore and was admitted to the bar in February 1841.

His brother was Coleman Yellott, a lawyer and state senator from Baltimore who served with Stonewall Jackson in the Confederate States Army.

== Career ==
Yellott commenced his law practice in Bel Air in Harford County, Maryland. In 1844, he was elected as a Whig to the Maryland House of Delegates, representing Harford County. He was renominated by his party for the House of Delegates, but declined. He resumed practicing law until January 1849. He then left Baltimore in the sailing vessel "Jane Parker" for California in the pursuit of gold during the California Gold Rush. He returned to Harford County in 1851 with only a single nugget of gold.

Yellott continued practicing law in Bel Air until 1858, when he moved to Towson. In 1868, he was elected as a Democrat as one of the associate judges of the Third Judicial Circuit Court and remained in that role until 1882. Yellott was elected chief judge of the Circuit Court and a judge of the Maryland Court of Appeals in 1882. He retired in 1889 after he reached the constitutional age limit of 70.

In 1848, Yellott published a volume of poems. In 1857, he published a tragedy entitled "Tamayo". In 1872, Yellott published his last work, a book entitled "Funny Philosophy". He was a frequent contributor to papers and magazines. He was a publisher of The Southern Aegis.

== Personal life ==
Yellott did not marry. He died on November 13, 1902, at the City Hospital in Baltimore.

Political offices
Preceded by Frederick Stone	Judge of the Maryland Court of Appeals; 1882–1889	Succeeded by William Shepard Bryan
