= Hugh C. Whiteford =

American politician

Member of the Maryland House of Delegates from the Harford County district
- In office 1847–1849 Serving with Abraham Cole, Henry D. Farnandis, John Hawkins, Luther M. Jarrett

Personal details
- Occupation: Politician

Hugh C. Whiteford was an American politician from Maryland. He served as a member of the Maryland House of Delegates, representing Harford County from 1847 to 1849.

Whiteford served as a member of the Maryland House of Delegates, representing Harford County, from 1847 to 1849.
