= Alfred W. Bateman =

American politician and judge (1815–1874)

Member of the Maryland House of Delegates from the Harford County district
- In office 1852–1853 Serving with Thomas Hope and William B. Stephenson

Personal details
- Born: 1815 Darlington, Maryland, U.S.
- Died: August 11, 1874 (aged 59) Bel Air, Maryland, U.S.
- Party: Democratic
- Occupation: Politician; judge; lawyer; newspaper publisher

Alfred W. Bateman (1815 – August 11, 1874) was an American politician, judge and newspaper publisher from Maryland. He served as a member of the Maryland House of Delegates, representing Harford County, from 1852 to 1853.

== Early life ==
Alfred W. Bateman was born in Darlington, Maryland, in 1815. At a young age, he moved to Havre de Grace and worked as a clerk. He studied law under John H. Price and Otho Scott. He was admitted to the bar in Harford County in May 1850.

== Career ==
Bateman served as a member of the Maryland House of Delegates, representing Harford County, from 1852 to 1853. Bateman was a Democrat.

Bateman then worked as a lawyer in Bel Air and worked as a special judge. In 1867, Bateman was elected as associate judge of the 13th district. In 1871, Bateman left the judgeship and moved to Baltimore to practice law.

In March 1862, Bateman purchased The Aegis from John Cox. He expanded the paper from five to six columns. After his election as judge, Bateman withdrew from editorial management. In 1870, Bateman stopped his association with the paper.

== Personal life ==
Bateman moved to Baltimore in 1871 and owned real estate in Bel Air. Bateman died on August 11, 1874, at the age of 59, at Grangers' Hotel in Bel Air.
