= Robert W. Holland =

American politician (died 1866)

Member of the Maryland House of Delegates from the Harford County district
- In office 1846–1846 Serving with Abraham Cole, Luther M. Jarrett, William B. Stephenson

Personal details
- Born: c. 1792
- Died: June 3, 1866 (aged 74) Harford County, Maryland, U.S.
- Occupation: Politician; judge

Robert W. Holland (c. 1792 – June 3, 1866) was an American politician and judge from Maryland. He served as a member of the Maryland House of Delegates, representing Harford County in 1846.

== Career ==
Holland served in the War of 1812 and helped defend Baltimore.

Holland served as county commissioner of Harford County and as judge of the orphans' court. Holland served as a member of the Maryland House of Delegates, representing Harford County in 1846.

== Personal life ==
Holland died on June 3, 1866, at the age of 74, at his home in Harford County.
