= Henry A. Silver =

American politician (1826–1885)

Member of the Maryland House of Delegates from the Harford County district
- In office 1865–1866 Serving with Isaac Cairnes, Thomas Chew Hopkins, Joshua Wilson
- In office 1856–1856 Serving with Robert E. Duvall and James H. Jarrett

Personal details
- Born: June 10, 1826 Harford County, Maryland, U.S.
- Died: May 27, 1885 (aged 58) St. Louis, Missouri, U.S.
- Resting place: Bellefontaine Cemetery; St. Louis, Missouri, U.S.
- Party: Know Nothing
- Children: 4
- Occupation: Politician; librarian

Henry A. Silver (June 10, 1826 – May 27, 1885) was an American politician and librarian from Maryland who served as a member of the Maryland House of Delegates, representing Harford County in 1856 and from 1865 to 1866.

== Early life ==
Henry A. Silver was born on June 10, 1826, in Harford County, Maryland.

== Career ==
Silver was a Know Nothing. Silver served as a member of the Maryland House of Delegates, representing Harford County in 1856 and from 1865 to 1866. Silver served as a vice president during the 1867 Maryland Constitutional Convention. In March 1868, Silver was appointed as librarian of the state of Maryland. In 1873, Silver ran for the Democratic nomination for the Maryland Senate, but lost. In 1874, Silver worked as the journal clerk of the Maryland House of Delegates.

Silver worked for the St. Louis, Missouri, railway mail service. At the time of his death, he was endorsed for promotion as superintendent of his department.

In 1859, Silver was a member of the board of directors of the Conowingo Bridge Company.

== Personal life ==
Silver married and had one son and three daughters, Edwin, Anna, Lizzie and May. His son Edwin A. Silver served as state's attorney in Jefferson City, Missouri, and was charged with the murder of a police officer.

Silver moved to Missouri later in life.

Silver died of apoplexy on May 27, 1885, in St. Louis. He was buried at Bellefontaine Cemetery in St. Louis.
