= Martin L. Jarrett =

American politician and physician (1841–1920)

Member of the Maryland House of Delegates from the Harford County district
- In office 1908–1911 Serving with Harry C. Lawder, Walter R. McComas, Joseph S. Whiteford, John W. Archer, Henry A. Osborn Jr., Fleury F. Sullivan

Personal details
- Born: Martin Luther Jarrett; November 18, 1841 Jarrettsville, Maryland, U.S.
- Died: September 23, 1920 (aged 78) Baltimore, Maryland, U.S.
- Resting place: Calvary Church
- Party: Democratic
- Spouse: Sarah Fannie Glenn (m. 1867; died 1898)
- Parent: Luther M. Jarrett (father)
- Relatives: James H. Jarrett (brother)
- Education: University of Maryland
- Occupation: Politician; physician

Martin Luther Jarrett (November 18, 1841 – September 23, 1920) was an American politician and physician from Maryland. He served as a member of the Maryland House of Delegates, representing Harford County, from 1908 to 1911.

== Early life ==
Martin Luther Jarrett was born on November 18, 1841, in Jarrettsville, Maryland, to Julia Ann (née Scarff) and Luther M. Jarrett. His brother was James H. Jarrett. He attended Bethel Academy in Cathcart for a time. He studied medicine under Drs. Chew and Butler of Baltimore. He graduated from the University of Maryland in 1864.

== Career ==
Jarrett served as a private in the 1st Maryland Cavalry in the Confederate States Army. He served until the end of the war. Since graduating, Jarrett practiced medicine in Jarrettsville and retired from the practice around 1900.

Jarrett was a Democrat. He served as a member of the Maryland House of Delegates, representing Harford County, from 1908 to 1911. He was a school commissioner in the 1890s. He was director of the Second National Bank of Bel Air.

== Personal life ==
Jarrett married Sarah Fannie Glenn on January 31, 1867. They had no children. She died in 1898. He was a Methodist.

Jarrett died on September 23, 1920, at the home of his niece at 410 East 25th Street in Baltimore. He was buried at Calvary Church.
