= Henry D. Farnandis =

American politician and lawyer (1817–1900)

Member of the Maryland Senate
- In office 1852–1856
- Preceded by: James Moores
- Succeeded by: Edwin H. Webster
- Constituency: Harford County

Member of the Maryland House of Delegates from the Harford County district
- In office 1849–1849 Serving with Abraham Cole, John Hawkins, Hugh C. Whiteford
- In office 1847–1847 Serving with Abraham Cole, Hugh C. Whiteford, Luther M. Jarrett

Personal details
- Born: Henry Dorsey Farnandis; April 1817
- Died: March 8, 1900 (aged 82) near Bel Air, Maryland, U.S.
- Resting place: Green Mount Cemetery; Baltimore, Maryland, U.S.
- Party: Democratic
- Spouse: Jane Poultney (died)
- Children: 2
- Education: Union College
- Occupation: Politician; lawyer

Henry Dorsey Farnandis (April 1817 – March 8, 1900) was an American politician and lawyer from Maryland. He represented Harford County as a member of the Maryland House of Delegates in 1847 and 1849 and as a member of the Maryland Senate from 1852 to 1856.

== Early life ==
Henry Dorsey Farnandis was born in April 1817 to Mary (née Dorsey) and Walter Farnandis. His father was an importer and dealer in dry goods. He studied at Union College in New York. He studied law under Otho Scott and was admitted to the bar in 1838 or 1839.

== Career ==
Farnandis started practicing law with Otho Scott as his partner. Farnandis served as counsel of the Philadelphia, Wilmington and Baltimore Railroad. He served as director of the Chesapeake and Ohio Canal. He was elected as president of the Chesapeake and Ohio Canal, but declined the position.

Farnandis was a Democrat. Farnandis served as a member of the Maryland House of Delegates, representing Harford County, in 1847 and 1849. Farnandis served as a member of the Maryland Senate, representing Harford County, from 1852 to 1856. Farnandis was a member of the state convention of the Maryland Constitution of 1867. He served as chairman of the Democratic Executive Committee of Harford County.

Farnandis served as president of the board of trustees of the Bel Air Academy in 1873.

== Personal life ==
Farnandis married Jane Poultney of Baltimore. They had two children, Mrs. Wakeman B. Munnikhuysen and Bessie. His wife died in 1887 or 1888.

Farnandis died on March 8, 1900, at his country home "Stockdale" near Bel Air, Maryland. He was buried at Green Mount Cemetery in Baltimore.
