= James H. Jarrett =

American politician and physician (1832–1922)

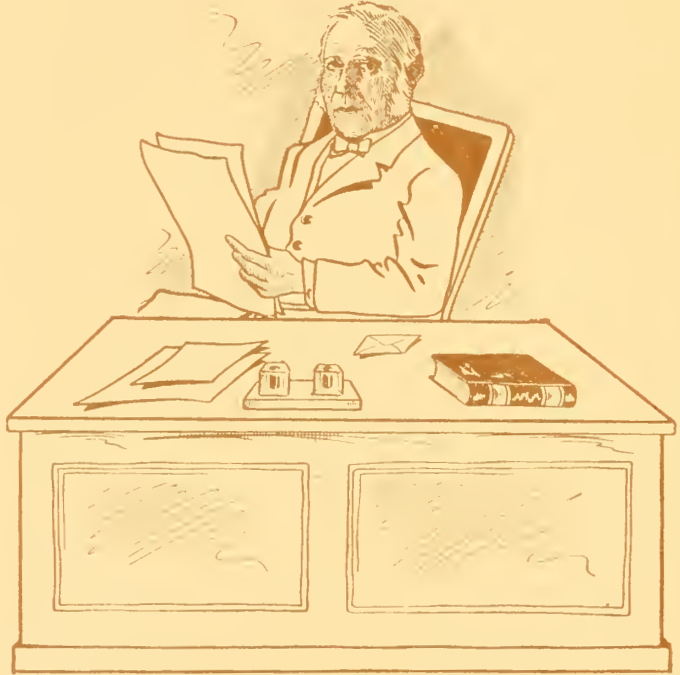
- Caricature of Jarrett in a 1916 publication

Member of the Maryland House of Delegates from the Harford County district
- In office 1856–1856 Serving with Robert E. Duvall and Henry A. Silver

Personal details
- Born: James Henry Jarrett; February 24, 1832 Taylor, Harford County, Maryland, U.S.
- Died: February 12, 1922 (aged 89) Towson, Maryland, U.S.
- Resting place: Prospect Hill Cemetery; Towson, Maryland, U.S.
- Party: Whig/Know Nothing (1855–1859); Republican (1860 and after)
- Spouse: Julia Ann Horner Spotswood (m. 1852)
- Children: 3
- Parent: Luther M. Jarrett (father)
- Relatives: Martin L. Jarrett (brother)
- Education: Dickinson College
- Alma mater: University of Maryland School of Medicine
- Occupation: Politician; physician

James Henry Jarrett (February 24, 1832 – February 12, 1922) was an American politician and physician from Maryland. He served as a member of the Maryland House of Delegates, representing Harford County in 1856.

== Early life ==
James Henry Jarrett was born on February 24, 1832, near Taylor, Harford County, Maryland, to Julia Ann (née Scarff) and Luther M. Jarrett. His father laid out the town Jarrettsville in Harford County in 1837. His brother was Martin L. Jarrett. In 1848, Jarrett attended Dickinson College. After two years at Dickinson, Jarrett switched to the University of Maryland School of Medicine. He graduated from the University of Maryland in 1852. His thesis was about pneumonia.

== Career ==
Jarrett moved back home on April 29, 1852, and started a medical practice in Jarrettsville for nine years.

Jarrett served in the Union Army. He enlisted in the Purnell Legion as an assistant surgeon. After a year, Jarrett was promoted to surgeon of the 7th Maryland Infantry Regiment. He later resigned his commission.

Jarrett was a Whig and Know Nothing. He served as a member of the Maryland House of Delegates, representing Harford County in 1856. Jarrett was a member of the 1858 Maryland convention that appointed governor Thomas Holliday Hicks. In 1860 and after, he would support the Republican Party.

In 1859, Jarrett ran for Harford County sheriff, but lost. Jarrett served as a member of U.S. president Chester Arthur's Pension Examining Board. He was appointed by governor Lloyd Lowndes Jr. to the commission that compiled and published Union soldiers from Maryland.

Jarrett started a medical practice in Towson, Maryland, in the 1860s. Jarrett would start a partnership with his son J. H. S. Jarrett in 1885. Jarrett was a member of the Medical and Chirurgical Faculty of Maryland and served as president of the Baltimore County Medical Association.

== Personal life ==
Jarrett married Julia Ann Horner Spotswood (or Spottswood) of Carlisle, Pennsylvania, on November 16, 1852. Jarrett had one son and two daughters, Harry S., Julia H. and Mrs. William A. Lee.

Jarrett was present at the Baltimore riot of 1861. Jarrett moved to Towson in 1865.

Jarrett died on February 12, 1922, at his home in Towson. He was buried at Prospect Hill Cemetery in Towson.
