= George Stephenson (politician) =

American politician (1814–1878)

Member of the Maryland House of Delegates from the Harford County district
- In office 1854–1854 Serving with Stevenson Archer and William M. Elliott

Personal details
- Born: March 14, 1814
- Died: October 23, 1878 (aged 64) Lapidum, Maryland, U.S.
- Party: Whig
- Relatives: William B. Stephenson (brother)
- Occupation: Politician

George Stephenson (March 14, 1814 – October 23, 1878) was an American politician from Maryland. He served as a member of the Maryland House of Delegates, representing Harford County in 1854.

== Early life and family ==
George Stephenson was born on March 14, 1814, to Priscilla (née Hopkins) and James Stephenson. His father was a slaveholder, served in the War of 1812 and was a hotelier in Perryville, Maryland. Stephenson was the brother of William B. Stephenson.

== Career ==
Stephenson was a Whig. Stephenson served as a member of the Maryland House of Delegates, representing Harford County in 1854.

== Personal life ==
Stephenson died on October 23, 1878, at his home in Lapidum, Maryland.
