= John W. Archer (politician) =

American politician

Member of the Maryland House of Delegates from the Harford County district
- In office 1910–1911 Serving with Martin L. Jarrett, Henry A. Osborn Jr., Fleury F. Sullivan

Personal details
- Party: Democratic
- Occupation: Politician

John W. Archer was an American politician from Maryland. He served as a member of the Maryland House of Delegates, representing Harford County, from 1910 to 1911.

== Career ==
Archer was a Democrat. He served as a member of the Maryland House of Delegates, representing Harford County, from 1910 to 1911.
