= Isaac Cairnes =

American politician (died 1890)

Isaac H. Cairnes

Member of the Maryland House of Delegates from the Harford County district
- In office 1865–1866 Serving with Thomas Chew Hopkins, Henry A. Silver, Joshua Wilson

Personal details
- Died: May 2, 1890
- Resting place: Bethel Presbyterian Church
- Occupation: Politician

Isaac H. Cairnes (died May 2, 1890) was an American politician from Maryland. He served as a member of the Maryland House of Delegates, representing Harford County from 1865 to 1866.

== Career ==
Isaac H. Cairnes served as a member of the Maryland House of Delegates, representing Harford County from 1865 to 1866.

== Personal life ==
Cairnes lived in Jarrettsville.

Cairnes died on May 2, 1890. He was buried at Bethel Presbyterian Church.
