= Coleman Yellott =

American judge (1821–1870)

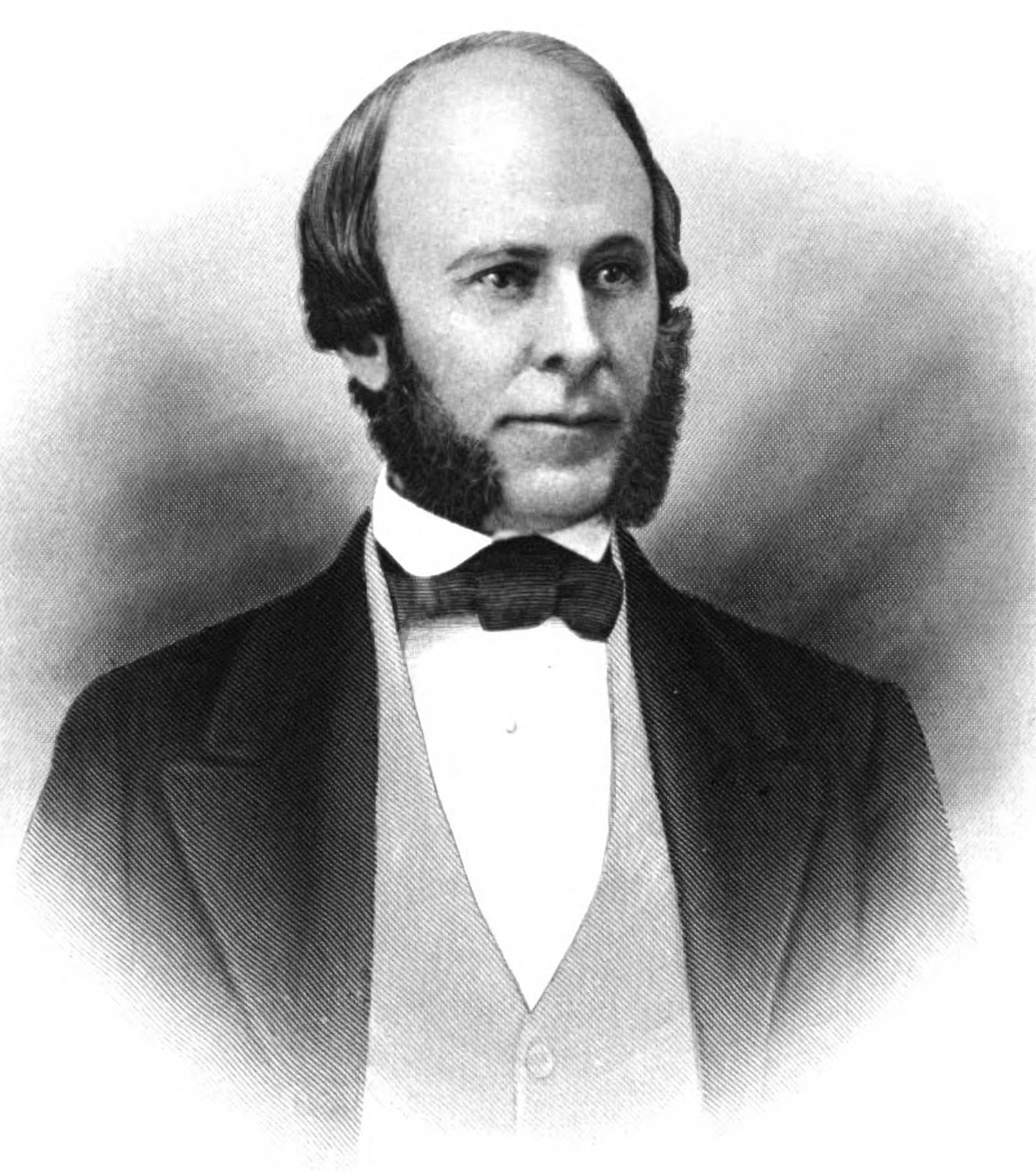

Member of the Maryland Senate
- In office 1860–1861

Member of the Maryland House of Delegates from the Harford County district
- In office 1842–1843 Serving with Francis Butler, Thomas Chew Hopkins, Luther M. Jarrett, William J. Polk, William B. Stephenson

Personal details
- Born: 1821 Dulaney Valley, Baltimore County, Maryland, U.S.
- Died: July 28, 1870 (aged 48–49) Leesburg, Virginia, U.S.
- Party: Whig; American Party
- Spouse: Mary Virginia Rust
- Children: 9
- Relatives: George Yellott (brother)
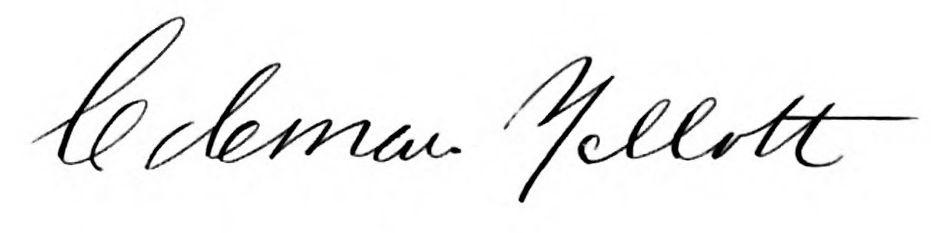
- Signature
- Military career
- Allegiance: Confederate States of America
- Branch: Confederate States Army
- Service years: 1861–1864
- Rank: Major
- Conflicts: American Civil War

Coleman Yellott (1821 – July 28, 1870) was a member of the Maryland House of Delegates and the Maryland Senate.

== Early life ==
Coleman Yellott was born in 1821, in Dulaney Valley, Baltimore County, Maryland, to Captain John Yellott. His father was a captain of a troop of cavalry in the War of 1812. His grandfather came from England around 1792. Yellott studied law and was admitted to the bar in Harford County.

Yellott was the brother of Judge George Yellott.

== Career ==
Yellott was elected to the Maryland House of Delegates, representing Harford County, as a Whig from 1842 to 1843. He then moved to Baltimore and was elected as a member of the American Party to the Maryland Senate from 1860 to 1861.

In May 1861, Yellott brought a bill before the senate. The bill was for the "public safety" of the people of Maryland. The bill would create a commission above the Governor and prepare a militia for the defense of the state, and presumably take Maryland into the Confederacy. The bill did not pass. He was a sympathizer of the South prior to the American Civil War. He was negotiating with the government of the Confederacy in Montgomery, Alabama when hostilities began. He then accepted an appointment as major and clerk of the military court which was attached to the Army of Southwestern Virginia. He served for four years and retired at the end of the war to Lexington, Virginia.

Yellott began the practice of law in Lexington. He returned to Baltimore in 1869 to resume the practice of law there, but died shortly after.

== Personal life ==
Yellott married Mary Virginia Rust, daughter of General George W. Rust, of Leesburg, Virginia. They had five sons and four daughters, including Robert E. Lee Yellott.

Yellott died on July 28, 1870, at the house of his brother-in-law, Colonel A. T. M. Rust, in Leesburg.
