= Harry C. Lawder =

American politician

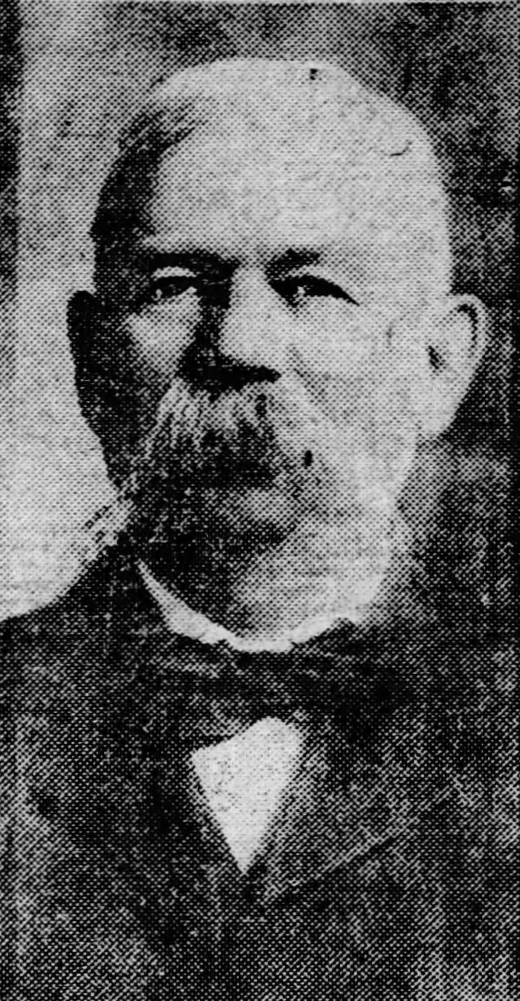
- Lawder in 1914 newspaper
- In office 1906–1909 Serving with Charles A. Andrew, Walter R. McComas, Edmund L. Oldfield, Martin L. Jarrett, Joseph S. Whiteford
- Constituency: Harford County

Personal details
- Born: March 4, 1844 Harford County, Maryland, U.S.
- Died: March 7, 1921 (aged 77)
- Party: Democratic
- Spouse: Esther Roxanna Moore (m. 1876)
- Children: 7, including Robert R.
- Occupation: Politician and merchant

Harry C. Lawder (March 4, 1844 – March 7, 1921) was an American politician and merchant in Maryland. He served as a member of the Maryland House of Delegates from 1906 to 1910.

== Early life ==
Harry C. Lawder was born on March 4, 1844, on a farm in Harford County, Maryland, to Eliza (née Miller) and Samuel Lawder. He attended public schools in Harford County.

== Career ==
Lawder was a meat and produce merchant. Lawder was appointed as officer of registration for Havre de Grace in 1886. He served as engrossing clerk of the Maryland Senate in 1900.

Lawder was a Democrat. He served as a member of the Maryland House of Delegates, representing Havre de Grace district of Harford County, from 1906 to 1910. In May 1914, Lawder was appointed postmaster of Havre de Grace. He resigned as postmaster in April 1918.

== Personal life ==
Lawder married Esther Roxanna Moore, daughter of Captain William Moore and descendant of John O'Neill, on February 29, 1876. They had seven children, Frederick C., Bessie M., Harry C. Jr., William M., May J., Murray Vandiver and Robert R. His son Robert R. was a member of the Maryland Senate and Maryland House of Delegates, and mayor of Havre de Grace. Lawder was a member of St. John's Episcopal Church.

Lawder died on March 7, 1921.
