= Abraham Cole =

American politician (died 1890)

Member of the Maryland House of Delegates from the Harford County district
- In office 1846–1849 Serving with Henry D. Farnandis, John Hawkins, Hugh C. Whiteford, Luther M. Jarrett, Robert W. Holland, William B. Stephenson

Personal details
- Born: c. 1808
- Died: April 29, 1890 (aged 82) Michaelsville, Harford County, Maryland, U.S.
- Resting place: Spesutia Church; Perryman, Maryland, U.S.
- Party: Democratic
- Spouse: Sarah E. (died 1890)
- Children: 4
- Occupation: Politician

Abraham Cole (c. 1808 – April 29, 1890) was an American politician from Maryland. He served as a member of the Maryland House of Delegates, representing Harford County, from 1846 to 1849.

== Career ==
Cole served as a member of the Maryland House of Delegates, representing Harford County, from 1846 to 1849. He was a Democrat.

== Personal life ==
Cole married Sarah E. His wife died in March 1890. They had two sons and two daughters, Cornelius, Henry, Mrs. William Reasin, and Fannie.

Cole died on April 29, 1890, at the age of 82, at his home, New Park Farm, near Michaelsville, Maryland. He was buried at Spesutia Church in Perryman.
