= William J. Polk =

American politician (died 1863)

Member of the Maryland House of Delegates from the Harford County district
- In office 1843–1844 Serving with Frederick T. Amos, Henry W. Archer, George Yellott, Thomas Chew Hopkins, William B. Stephenson, Coleman Yellott

Personal details
- Born: c. 1808
- Died: October 13, 1863 (aged 55) Abingdon, Maryland, U.S.
- Party: Whig
- Occupation: Politician

William J. Polk (c. 1808 – October 13, 1863) was an American politician from Maryland.

== Biography ==
Polk was a Whig. Polk served as a member of the Maryland House of Delegates, representing Harford County, from 1843 to 1844.

Polk died on October 13, 1863, at the age of 55, in Abingdon, Maryland.
