= Robert E. Duvall =

American politician

Member of the Maryland House of Delegates from the Harford County district
- In office 1856–1856 Serving with James H. Jarrett and Henry A. Silver

Personal details
- Party: Know Nothing
- Occupation: Politician

Robert E. Duvall was an American politician from Maryland. He served as a member of the Maryland House of Delegates, representing Harford County in 1856.

== Career ==
In 1858, Duvall was appointed by governor Thomas Holliday Hicks as assistant inspector of flour. He was appointed again by governor Thomas Swann in 1868.

Duvall was a Know Nothing. Duvall served as a member of the Maryland House of Delegates, representing Harford County in 1856.
