= Walter R. McComas =

American politician and lawyer (1879–1922)

- In office 1906–1909 Serving with Charles A. Andrew, Harry C. Lawder, Edmund L. Oldfield, Martin L. Jarrett, Joseph S. Whiteford
- Constituency: Harford County

Personal details
- Born: January 23, 1879 Baltimore County, Maryland, U.S.
- Died: April 19, 1922 (aged 43) Baltimore, Maryland, U.S.
- Resting place: Bethel Cemetery
- Party: Democratic
- Spouse: Mabel M.
- Children: 1
- Occupation: Politician; lawyer

Walter R. McComas (January 23, 1879 – April 19, 1922) was an American politician and lawyer from Maryland. He served as a member of the Maryland House of Delegates, representing Harford County, from 1906 to 1909.

== Early life ==
Walter R. McComas was born on January 23, 1879, at My Lady's Manor in Baltimore County, Maryland. He moved to Harford County in 1885. He was educated at public schools and graduated from Bel Air High School in 1898. He entered the law office of Thomas H. Robinson and was admitted to the bar in 1904.

== Career ==
In 1902, McComas was appointed by Governor John Walter Smith as magistrate. From 1900 to 1910, McComas was a member of Company D, First Regiment of the Maryland Army National Guard. He rose to the rank of captain.

McComas was a Democrat. He served as a member of the House of Delegates, representing Harford County, from 1906 to 1909. McComas was elected as state's attorney in 1915. He was re-elected in 1919.

== Personal life ==
McComas married Mabel M. They had one son, John Alden.

McComas died on April 19, 1922, at Church Home and Infirmary in Baltimore. He was buried at Bethel Cemetery.
