= Baltimore Grand =

- U.S. National Register of Historic Places
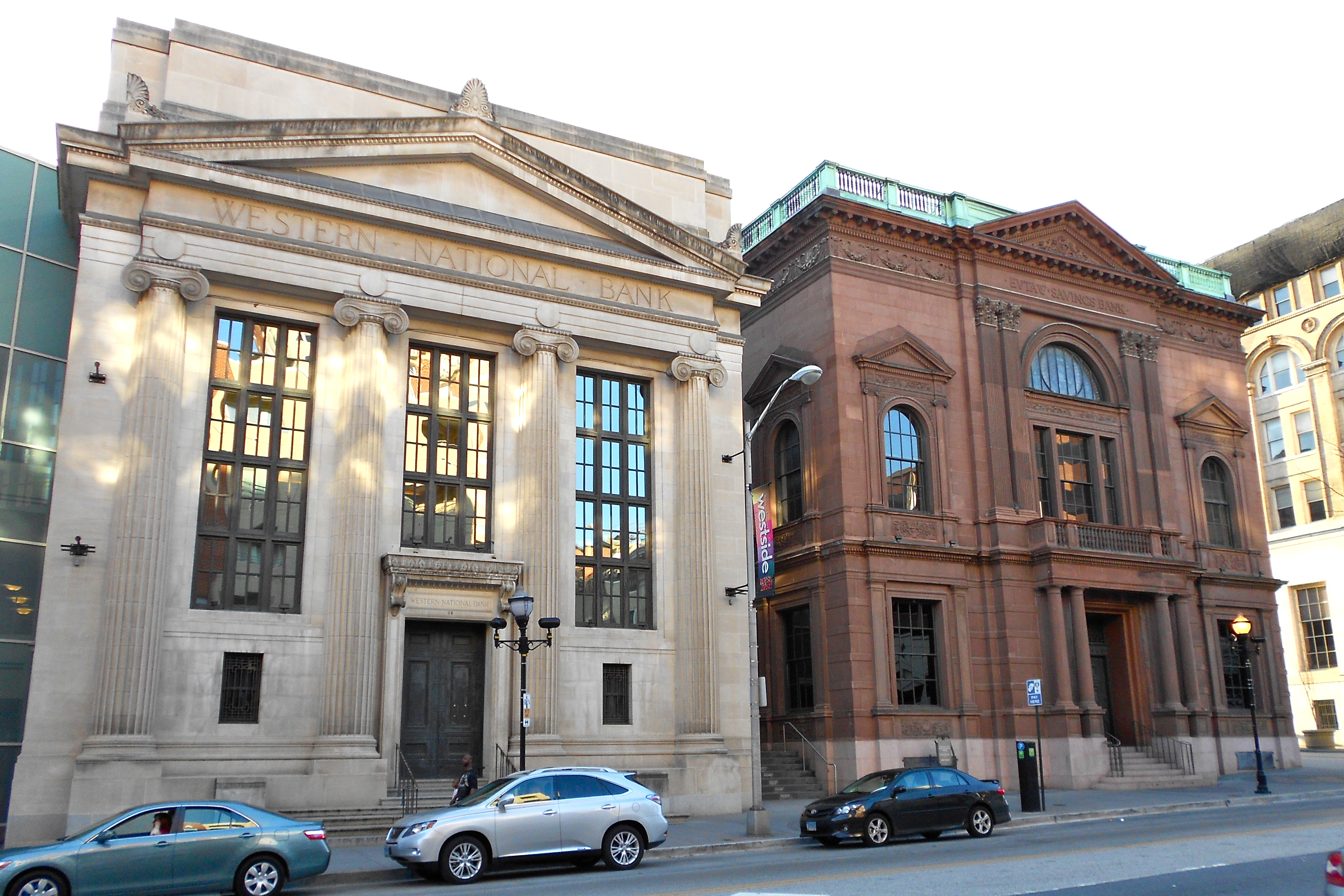
- Baltimore Grand, March 2012

- Location within Baltimore Location within Maryland Location within the United States
- Location: 401 West Fayette St., Baltimore, Maryland
- Coordinates: 39°17′24″N 76°37′17″W
- Area: 0.5 acres (0.20 ha)
- Built: 1881
- Architect: Carson, Charles L.; et.al.
- Architectural style: Classical Revival
- NRHP reference No.: 99001671
- Added to NRHP: January 14, 2000

Baltimore Grand is a historic bank building located at Baltimore, Maryland, United States. It occupies two historic bank buildings, the former Western National Bank (1881, remodeled 1912) and the former Eutaw Savings Bank (1887, remodeled 1911), which were connected in 1989 and adaptively reused to create a commercial catering and banquet facility. It features a large arched window above the entrance portico that is framed by paired fluted pilasters with Corinthian capitals extending to the cornice line.

The former Eutaw Savings Bank is a Classical Revival brownstone, built when the bank vacated the Baltimore Equitable Society Building across the street. The original building was designed by Charles L. Carson. A 1911 addition was designed by Baldwin and Pennington. Further alterations were carried out in 1912 by the firm of George C Haskell, a Carson protégé, and his partner G. Summerfield Barnes.

Baltimore Grand was listed on the National Register of Historic Places in 2000.
