= The Aegis & Intelligencer =

Newspaper published in Bel Air, Maryland, US

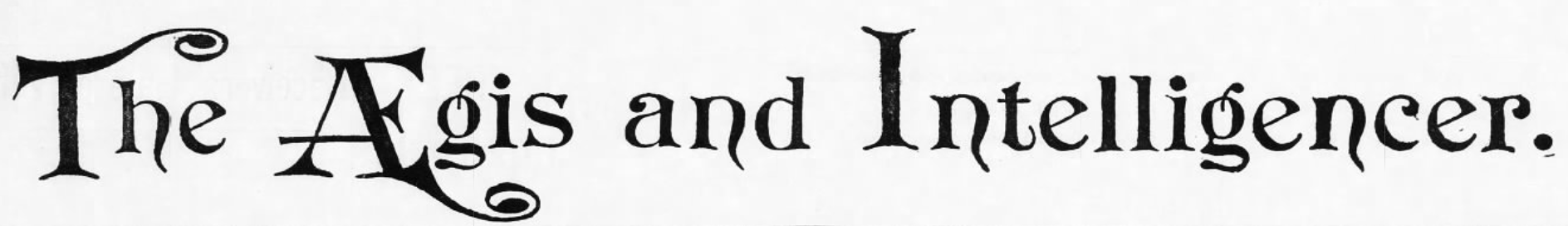

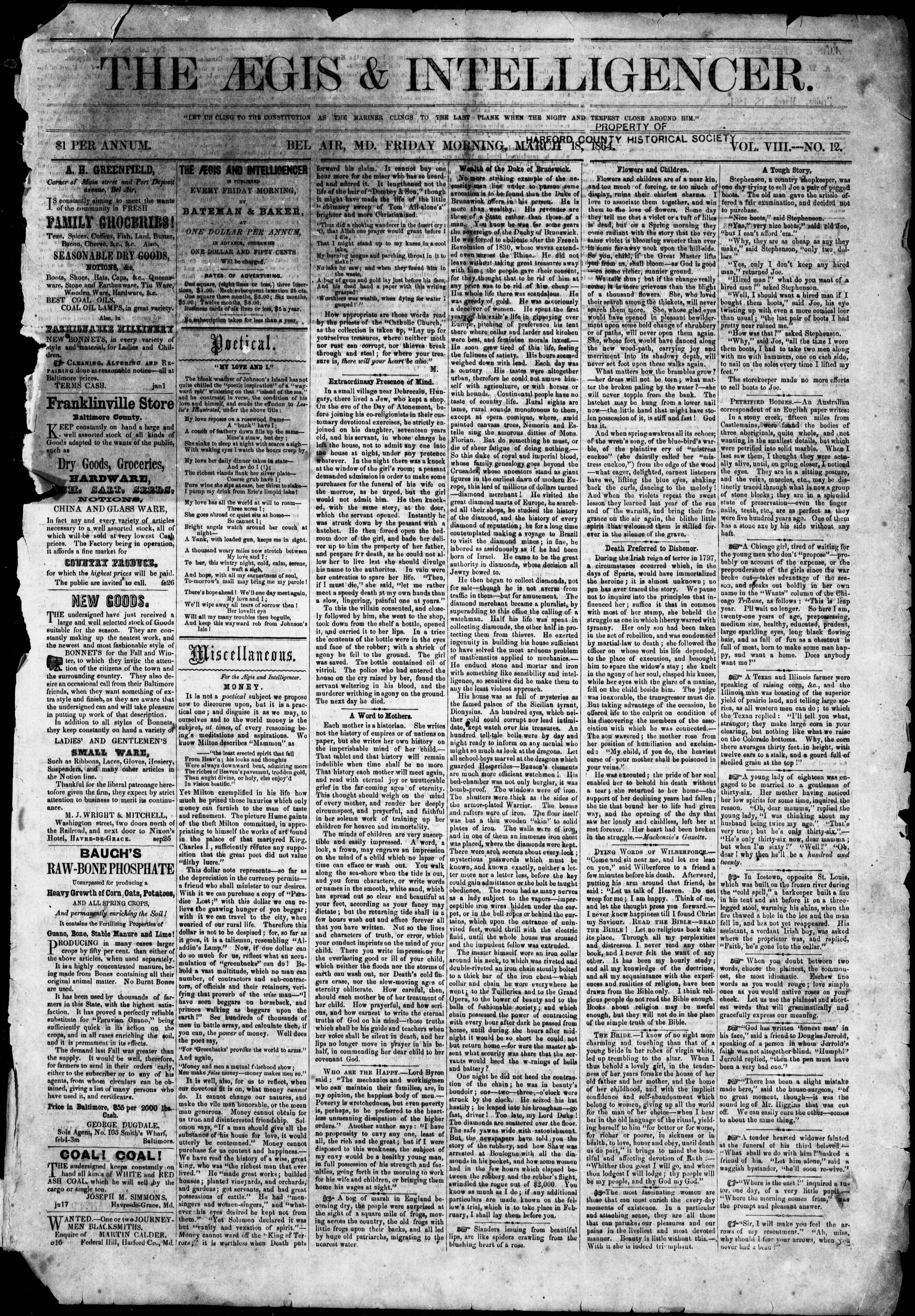
- The cover page of the March 18, 1864 issue of The Aegis & Intelligencer
- Type: Weekly newspaper
- Owner(s): Walter Finney and Louis Dashiell (1899-1904), John D. Worthington (1904-1923)
- Founder: John Cox
- Publisher: Bateman & Baker (1864-1869), F.W. Baker (1869-1894), Frank E. Gorrell (1894-1899), Walter Finney and Louis Dashiell (1899-1904), John D. Worthington (1904-1923)
- Editor: A. W. Bateman (1864-1869), Frederick W. Baker (1869-1894; 1899-1904), Frank E. Gorrell (1894-1899), John D. Worthington (1904-1923)
- Founded: 1856
- Ceased publication: January 26, 1923
- Relaunched: January 27, 1923 The Aegis
- Political alignment: conservative Unionist
- Language: English
- Headquarters: Bel Air, Maryland
- OCLC number: 9406028

The Aegis & Intelligencer was a conservative Unionist newspaper published from March 18, 1864 to January 26, 1923 in Bel Air, Maryland. The paper was originally named "Aegis" in reference to Zeus' shield in Greek mythology, and was meant to "evoke protection for the interests of Harford residents" as well as reflect the founding paper's Southern sympathies. Its initial publisher, Frederick W. Baker, became notorious for his controversial editorial positions such as violent opposition to African American advancement under Reconstruction. During this period, The Aegis & Intelligencer "could be counted upon to be anti-black and conservatively Democratic at all times." However, the paper also recorded the increasing economic growth of Bel Air and published stories documenting the construction of the Maryland Central Railroad in 1883 and the arrival of the American Union Telegraph Company in 1880.

Baker sold the paper to Frank E. Gorrell in 1894, who in turn sold it to Walter Finney and Louis Dashiell in 1899. The newspaper was then purchased by John D. Worthington, Sr. in 1904, and he simplified the name of the newspaper to The Aegis in 1923. In 1986, the Times Mirror Company, then-owner of The Baltimore Sun, purchased The Aegis, and the newspaper continues its run to this day.
