= Maryland Stadium Authority =

State agency of Maryland, US

The Maryland Stadium Authority, MSA, was created by Chapter 283, Acts of 1986 Maryland General Assembly. Its initial mission was to return the National Football League (NFL) to Baltimore. Maryland sought a new football team after former Baltimore Colts owner, Robert Irsay, moved the Colts out of the city in the middle of a snowy night on March 29, 1984. The Authority is a public corporation of Maryland which is authorized to issue tax-exempt bonds for financing its operations. The proceeds from the sale of those bonds and any other revenues collected are deposited in the Maryland Stadium Authority Financing Fund.

== Goals and responsibilities ==
Since its creation, the MSA broadened its goals and responsibilities. Soon after its incorporation, it sought to negotiate a long-term lease with the Baltimore Orioles, its last remaining professional sports team (Baltimore also lost the Bullets to suburban Washington, D.C. (Landover, Maryland) in the early 1970s).

In 1992, under the auspices of the MSA, Orioles Park at Camden Yards was opened. The MSA continued to work toward acquiring a new NFL team. The city was courted by the owners of teams such as the Tampa Bay Buccaneers, the New Orleans Saints, the St. Louis Cardinals, the Los Angeles Rams, only to be repeatedly disappointed. Baltimore thought it had its best shot in the 1993 NFL Expansion, but the league decided to put teams in Charlotte, North Carolina and Jacksonville, Florida, smaller cities in the south. The city finally acquired the old Cleveland Browns team in 1995 under the leadership of John Moag, Chairman of the Maryland Stadium Authority at the time.

Ironically, the other remaining areas seeking an NFL team, St. Louis and Tennessee all acquired teams through relocations. The Los Angeles Rams moved to St. Louis and the Houston Oilers temporarily relocated to Memphis, Tennessee before moving to their new stadium in Nashville. All three teams that relocated made it to the Super Bowl soon after they moved, St. Louis and Tennessee in 2000 and Baltimore in 2001.

Some other projects that the MSA has been tasked to handle are:

- Oriole Park at Camden Yards
- Baltimore Convention Center expansion
- Hippodrome Theatre renovation
- M&T Bank Stadium, home of the Baltimore Ravens
- Memorial Stadium, former home of the Baltimore Orioles
- Ocean City Convention Center
- Ripken Stadium in Aberdeen, Maryland
- University of Maryland parking garage
- Xfinity Center (formerly Comcast Center), basketball arena for the Maryland Terrapins

== Authority composition ==
The Maryland Stadium Authority is governed by a 9-member board of directors, all of whom serve 4-year terms. Six directors are appointed by the governor with one appointment by Baltimore's mayor, one appointment by the President of the Maryland Senate, and one appointment by the Speaker of the Maryland House of Delegates:

Name	Term End	Appointer
Craig A. Thompson (Chair)	2027	governor
Leonard J. Attman	2021	governor
Joseph C. Bryce	2023	governor
Gary L. Mangum	2023	governor
Jody C. Stanalonis	2024	governor
Manervia W. Riddick	2025	governor
William H. Cole IV		president
Vacant		speaker
Michael G. Huber	2024	mayor

Executive Director

- Michael J. Frenz
