= Bagby Furniture Company Building =

Historic industrial building in Maryland, US

- U.S. National Register of Historic Places
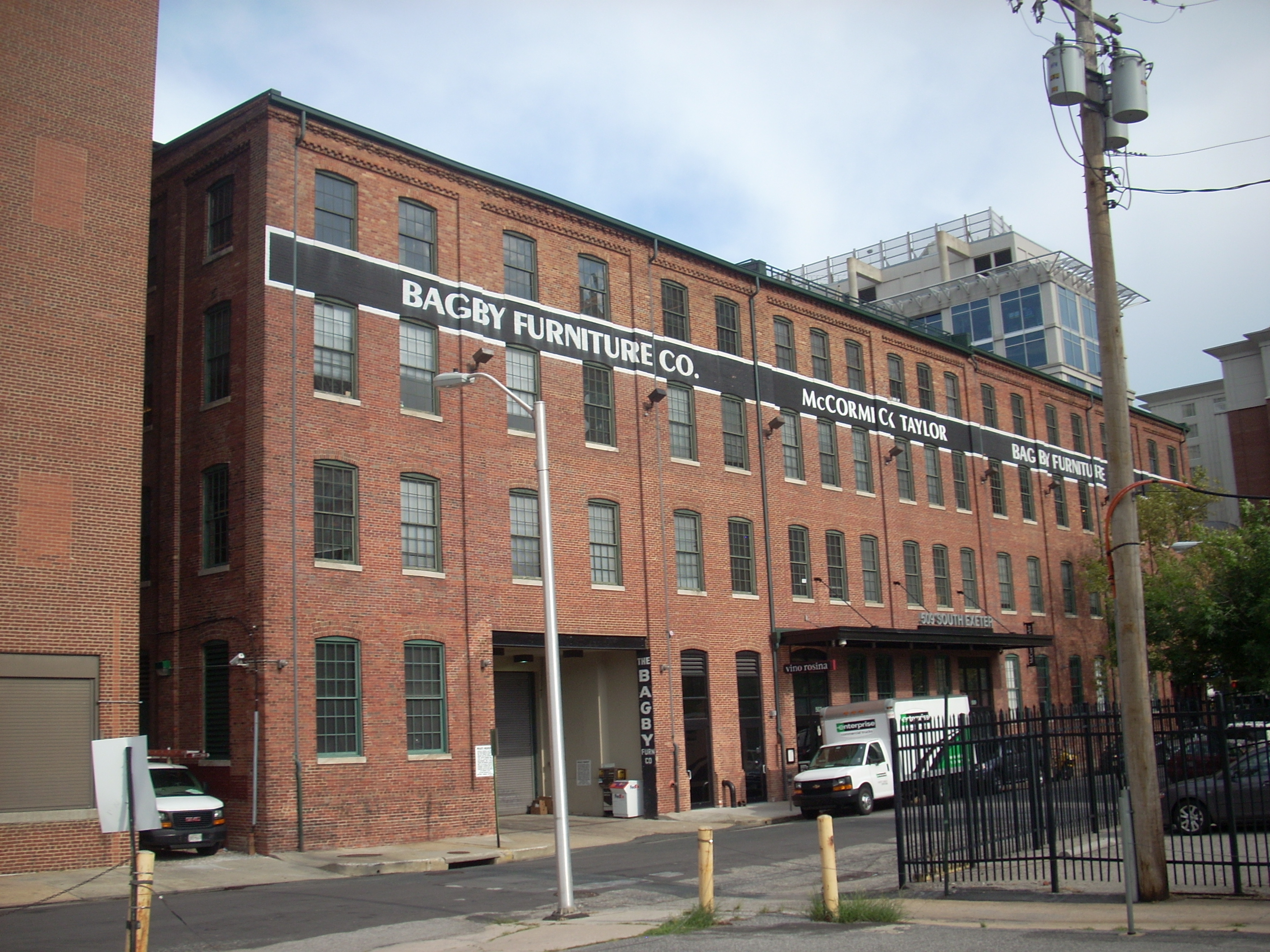
- Bagby Furniture Company Building in 2011

- Location within Baltimore Location within Maryland Location within the United States
- Location: 509 S. Exeter St., Baltimore, Maryland
- Coordinates: 39°17′5″N 76°36′0″W
- Area: less than one acre
- Built: 1907
- Architectural style: Early Commercial
- NRHP reference No.: 98001263
- Added to NRHP: October 22, 1998

Bagby Furniture Company Building is a historic factory building located at Baltimore, Maryland, United States. It is a four-story, U-shaped, brick factory building composed of three sections constructed between 1902 and 1907. Its exterior features segmental and jack arches above openings, a corbeled watertable, and a corbeled cornice. It housed the Bagby Furniture Company, which operated from 1879 to 1990.

Bagby Furniture Company Building was listed on the National Register of Historic Places in 1998.
