= Henry A. Osborn Jr. =

American politician (1884–1918)

Member of the Maryland House of Delegates from the Harford County district
- In office 1910–1914 Serving with John W. Archer, Martin L. Jarrett, Fleury F. Sullivan

Personal details
- Born: Henry Amos Osborn Jr. October 2/3, 1884 Harford County, Maryland, U.S.
- Died: October 26, 1918 (aged 34) near Havre de Grace, Maryland, U.S.
- Resting place: Grove Cemetery; Aberdeen, Maryland, U.S.
- Party: Democratic
- Education: University of Virginia School of Law

Henry Amos Osborn Jr. (October 2/3, 1884 – October 26, 1918) was an American politician from Maryland. He served as a member of the Maryland House of Delegates, representing Harford County from 1910 to 1914.

== Early life ==
Henry Amos Osborn Jr. was born on October 2 (or 3), 1884, in Harford County, Maryland, to Frances A. and Henry A. Osborn. He was educated in public schools and at the Tome School. He graduated from the University of Virginia School of Law in 1906. He was admitted to the bar in 1906.

== Career ==
Osborn started law offices in Havre de Grace and Bel Air. He was also engaged with his father in his canning business. He also worked with the brokerage firm William Silver & Co. Inc. He was a director of the First National Bank of Havre de Grace and counsel for the Atlas Powder Company. He acted as county chairman of the American Red Cross.

Osborn was a Democrat. He served as a member of the Maryland House of Delegates, representing Harford County for two terms, from 1910 to 1914. He was a candidate for the speaker while in the House of Delegates. In 1916, Osborn was nominated as Treasurer of Maryland, opposing Murray Vandiver.

== Personal life ==
Osborn died on October 26, 1918, at his home near Havre de Grace. He died following contracting the Spanish flu and pneumonia. He was buried at Grove Cemetery in Aberdeen.
