= The Aegis (newspaper) =

Newspaper in Maryland, USA

- Type: Twice-weekly newspaper
- Owner: Baltimore Sun Media Group
- Founder: John Cox
- Publisher: John W. Worthington (1923-1964), Shield Press (1964-1986), Tribune Publishing (1986-current)
- Founded: 1856
- Language: English
- Headquarters: Bel Air, Maryland
- Sister newspapers: The Baltimore Sun
- OCLC number: 20304891
- Website: theaegis.com

The Aegis, formerly The Ægis, is a local newspaper in Harford County, Maryland, United States. Its first issue was published on February 2, 1923.

== History ==
Before the Times Mirror Company, then-owners of The Baltimore Sun, purchased The Aegis in 1986, it was known as The Aegis & Intelligencer. In 1923, then-owner John D. Worthington, Sr. simplified its name to The Aegis. The name "Aegis" originally derived from Greek mythology and is a reference to Zeus' shield, meant to "evoke protection for the interests of Harford residents" as well as the founding paper's Southern sympathies.

Since 1923, The Aegis has gone through several name changes. From March 16, 1951, to January 9, 1964, the paper was known as The Aegis and Harford Gazette. From January 16, 1964, to September 18, 1969, it was named The Aegis, the Harford Gazette and the Democratic Ledger. Finally, on September 25, 1969, its original name of The Aegis was restored, and it is published under this name to this day as a sister paper to The Baltimore Sun.

The first building built specifically to house The Aegis was constructed in 1871, at 119 S. Main Street in Bel Air, Maryland. In 1962 the paper moved to a larger facility on Hays Street.

== Notable figures ==
William Robert Wallis, known to most as "Robbie," started out on a pre-law track at the University of Baltimore, but was convinced to join The Aegis in 1952 by John D. Worthington II as the paper's first sports editor. He worked for The Aegis for 38 years and was managing editor of the paper by the time of his retirement in 1990. Robert was well known in Bel Air and active in numerous state and local organizations, even serving for 11 years as a member of the Maryland Stadium Authority.

The Worthington family played a huge role in shaping the newspaper throughout its history, beginning with John D. Worthington Sr. who purchased the paper in 1904. Expanding with each successive generation, The Aegis stayed in the hands of the Worthingtons until 2010, when John D. Worthington IV retired, ending his family's 105-year ownership of the paper. He had been at the helm since 1973, surviving two purchases of the paper: one by the Times Mirror in 1986 and another by the Tribune Media Company in 2000.
