= Yellott =

Yellott is a surname. Notable people with the surname include:

- Coleman Yellott (1821–1870), American politician
- George Yellott (1819–1902), American judge and poet
- John I. Yellott (1908–1986), American engineer known for solar energy research
- John I. Yellott (politician) (1840–1919), American politician
- Osborne I. Yellott (1871–1922), American politician and lawyer
