= Thomas Hope (American politician) =

American politician (1784–1876)

Thomas Hope Jr.

Member of the Maryland House of Delegates from the Harford County district
- In office 1852–1853 Serving with Alfred W. Bateman and William B. Stephenson
- In office 1838–1841 Serving with Charles D. Bouldin, Henry H. Johns, Samuel Sutton, C. W. Billingslea, William Whiteford, John C. Polk, James W. Williams, William S. Forwood, Israel D. Maulsby
- In office 1832–1832 Serving with John Forwood, Henry H. Johns, Samuel Sutton
- In office 1826–1829 Serving with Henry H. Johns, James Moores, Samuel Sutton, William Smithson, James Montgomery, Alexander Norris
- In office 1824–1824 Serving with Abraham Jarrett, James Montgomery, Alexander Norris

Personal details
- Born: September 20, 1784 Harford County, Maryland, U.S.
- Died: August 2, 1876 (aged 91) Taylor, Maryland, U.S.
- Resting place: Bethel Presbyterian Church cemetery
- Spouse: Catherine Hutchins
- Children: 8
- Occupation: Politician

Thomas Hope Jr. (September 20, 1784 – August 2, 1876) was an American politician from Maryland. He served as a member of the Maryland House of Delegates, representing Harford County, in 1824, from 1826 to 1829, in 1832, from 1838 to 1841 and from 1852 to 1853.

== Early life ==
Thomas Hope Jr. was born on September 20, 1784, in Harford County, Maryland, to Thomas Hope. His great-grandfather was known for his service in the Battle of the Boyne.

== Career ==
Hope served with John Streett's regiment in the War of 1812. He was a member of Captain Joseph Jenkins's company. He was a farmer.

Hope served as a member of the Maryland House of Delegates, representing Harford County, in 1824, from 1826 to 1829, in 1832, from 1838 to 1841 and from 1852 to 1853. He was a presidential elector for president Andrew Jackson and was a member of the "Glorious Nineteen", a number of electors that challenged members of the Whig Party and advocated that state senators should be elected by the people.

== Personal life ==
Hope married Catherine Hutchins of Baltimore County. They had eight children, including William and Ellen. Hope was a member of the Bethel Presbyterian Church.

In April 1876, Hope was run over by a carriage. Hope died on August 2, 1876, at his home near Taylor, Maryland. He was buried at the Bethel Presbyterian Church cemetery.
