= William Forwood =

William Forwood may refer to:

- William Bower Forwood, English merchant, shipowner and politician
- William H. Forwood, United States Army surgeon general
- William L. Forwood, American politician
- William S. Forwood, American politician
- Bill Forwood, Australian politician
