= James Wray Williams =

American politician (1792–1842)

Member of the U.S. House of Representatives from Maryland's 3rd district
- In office March 4, 1841 – December 2, 1842
- Preceded by: Charles Sterrett Ridgely
- Succeeded by: Charles Sterrett Ridgely

Speaker of the Maryland House of Delegates
- In office 1839–1839
- Preceded by: Charles Sterrett Ridgely
- Succeeded by: Charles Sterrett Ridgely

Member of the Maryland House of Delegates from the Harford County district
- In office 1838–1841 Serving with Thomas Hope, John C. Polk, Samuel Sutton, William S. Forwood, Israel D. Maulsby, William L. Forwood, James Nelson
- In office 1825–1825 Serving with Henry Hall, James Montgomery, Charles S. Sewall

Personal details
- Born: October 8, 1792
- Died: December 2, 1842 (aged 50) Taylor, Maryland, U.S.
- Resting place: Bethel Presbyterian Church cemetery
- Occupation: Politician

James Wray Williams (October 8, 1792 – December 2, 1842) was a U.S. representative from Maryland. He served as a member of the Maryland House of Delegates in 1825 and from 1837 to 1839. He served as speaker of the Maryland House of Delegates in 1839.

== Early life ==
James Wray Williams was born on October 8, 1792. He completed preparatory studies.

== Career ==
Williams served as a member of the Maryland House of Delegates, representing Harford County, in 1825 and from 1837 to 1839. He served as speaker in 1839.

Williams was elected as a Democrat to the 27th Congress and served from March 4, 1841, until his death.

== Personal life ==
Williams died on December 2, 1842, at his home at the Prieshford farm, Deer Creek, Maryland. He was interred in the family cemetery on Prieshford farm.

== See also ==
- List of members of the United States Congress who died in office (1790–1899)

Political offices
| Preceded by Charles Sterrett Ridgely | Speaker of the Maryland House of Delegates; 1839 | Succeeded by Charles Sterrett Ridgely |
U.S. House of Representatives
| Preceded by John Tolley Hood Worthington | Member of the U.S. House of Representatives from Maryland's 3rd congressional district 1841–1842 | Succeeded by Charles S. Sewall |
