= Israel D. Maulsby =

American politician (1781–1839)

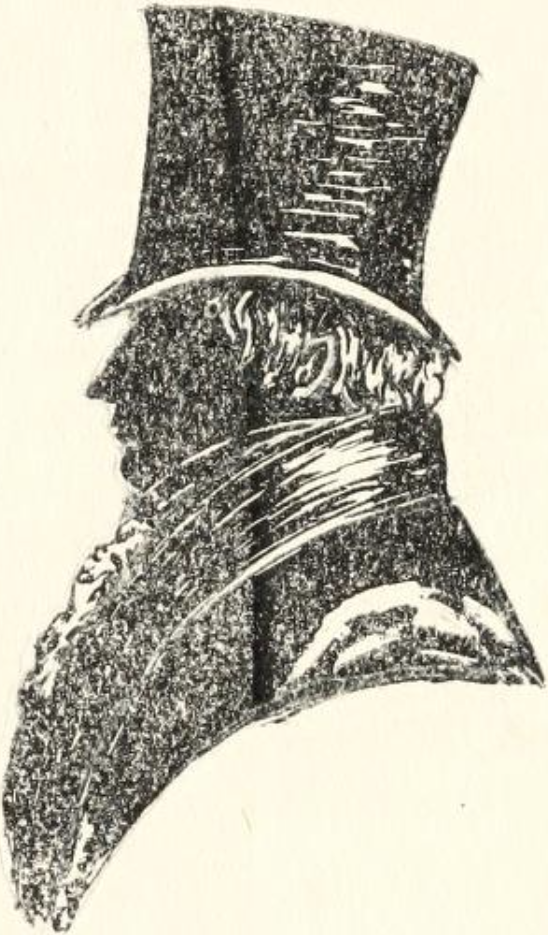
- Sketch of Maulsby in 1909 publication

Member of the Maryland House of Delegates from the Harford County district
- In office 1836–1838 Serving with William S. Forwood, Thomas Hope, James Wray Williams, William L. Forwood, James Nelson, Stephen Boyd, Harry D. Gough
- In office 1818–1820 Serving with Abel Alderson, William H. Allen, Alexander Norris, John Forwood, Henry Hall, George Henderson, James Steel
- In office 1813–1813 Serving with Francis J. Dallam, John Forwood, of Jacob, John Forwood, of William

Personal details
- Born: Israel David Maulsby; 1781 York County, Pennsylvania, U.S.
- Died: 1839 (aged 57–58)
- Resting place: Rock Spring Church near Bel Air, Maryland, U.S.
- Spouse: Jane Hall (m. 1804)
- Children: 15, including William
- Relatives: John I. Yellott (grandson); Richard Dallam (grandson); Emily Nelson Ritchie McLean (great-granddaughter)
- Occupation: Politician; lawyer

Israel David Maulsby (1781 – 1839) was an American politician from Maryland. He served as a member of the Maryland House of Delegates, representing Harford County in 1813, from 1818 to 1820 and from 1836 to 1838.

== Early life ==
Israel David (or Davidson) Maulsby was born in 1781 in York County, Pennsylvania, to Margaret (née Hussy) and David Maulsby.

== Career ==
Maulsby volunteered and helped defend Baltimore at the Battle of North Point during the War of 1812. He served as a member of the Independent Blues. Maulsby served as president of the governor's council during Charles Goldsborough's term in office. He worked as a lawyer.

Maulsby served as a member of the Maryland House of Delegates, representing Harford County in 1813, from 1818 to 1820 and from 1836 to 1838.

== Personal life ==
Maulsby was a Freemason. He was master of Mount Ararat Lodge, No. 44 in Bel Air and served as senior grand warden of the Grand Lodge of Maryland in 1836 and 1837. He was also a member of the Episcopal Church.

Maulsby married Jane Hall on April 17, 1804. They had fifteen children, including Margaret M., John Hall, Israel David, Eleanor, Benjamin, William Pinkney, Sarah Jane, Hannah Elizabeth, Mary Cordelia, Harriet Belinda, Charles Hall, Israel Thomas, Charlotte Emily and Anne. Only six daughters and five sons lived to adulthood. His grandson was John I. Yellott, lawyer and politician. His grandson Richard Dallam was Secretary of State of Maryland.

Maulsby died in 1839. He was buried at Rock Spring Church near Bel Air.
