= Bouldin =

Bouldin may refer to

== People ==
- Charles D. Bouldin (died 1882), American politician and newspaper publisher
- James Bouldin (1792 - 1854), U.S. Representative from Virginia
- Thomas Bouldin (1781 - 1834), U.S. Representative from Virginia
- Virgil Bouldin (1866–1949), justice of the Supreme Court of Alabama

== Places ==
- Bouldin Creek, a neighborhood in Austin, Texas
