= Henry H. Johns =

American politician

Member of the Maryland House of Delegates from the Harford County district
- In office 1845–1845 Serving with Benedict H. Hanson, William B. Stephenson, Abraham J. Streett
- In office 1841–1841 Serving with Charles D. Bouldin, Thomas Hope, Samuel Sutton
- In office 1831–1834 Serving with James Moores, James Nelson, Samuel Sutton, John Forwood, Thomas Hope, Frederick T. Amos
- In office 1828–1829 Serving with Thomas Hope, James Moores, Samuel Sutton, William Smithson

Personal details
- Occupation: Politician

Henry H. Johns was an American politician from Maryland. He served as a member of the Maryland House of Delegates, representing Harford County from 1828 to 1829, 1831 to 1834 and in 1841 and 1845.

== Career ==
Henry H. Johns served as a member of the Maryland House of Delegates, representing Harford County from 1828 to 1829, 1831 to 1834 and in 1841 and 1845.

Johns ran for judge of the orphans' court in 1859, but was unsuccessful.
