= Charlton W. Billingslea =

American politician and judge (died 1889)

Member of the Maryland House of Delegates from the Harford County district
- In office 1840–1841 Serving with Thomas Hope, Samuel Sutton, William Whiteford

Personal details
- Born: c. 1807 Harford County, Maryland, U.S.
- Died: January 26, 1889 (aged 82)
- Resting place: St. Mary's Church; Emmorton, Maryland, U.S.
- Party: Whig; Democratic
- Children: 2
- Occupation: Politician; judge

Charlton W. Billingslea (c. 1807 – January 26, 1889) was an American politician and judge from Maryland. He served as a member of the Maryland House of Delegates, representing Harford County from 1840 to 1841.

== Early life ==
Charlton W. Billingslea was born in Harford County, Maryland.

== Career ==
Billingslea was a collector of taxes. Billingslea was a Whig. He served as a member of the Maryland House of Delegates, representing Harford County from 1840 to 1841.

In 1845, Billingslea was appointed chief judge of the orphans' court by governor Thomas Pratt. In 1851, he was elected as register of wills. He served until he was succeeded by Benedict H. Hanson after the adoption of the 1857 Maryland constitution. Billingslea changed from Whig to Democrat towards the end of the Civil War. In 1870, Billingslea was appointed again as chief judge of the orphans' court by governor Oden Bowie. He was then elected in 1875, 1879 and 1883 as chief judge on the Democratic ticket. His term ended in 1887.

== Personal life ==
Billingslea had a son and a daughter, Charlton W. Jr. and Mrs. William D. Harryman.

Billingslea died of heart failure on January 26, 1889, at the age of 82. He was buried at St. Mary's Church in Emmorton, Maryland.
