= William Whiteford =

American politician

Member of the Maryland House of Delegates from the Harford County district
- In office 1840–1841 Serving with Charlton W. Billingslea, Thomas Hope, Samuel Sutton
- In office 1821–1823 Serving with Alexander Norris, Charles S. Sewall, James Steel, William H. Allen, John Chauncey, John Forwood

William Whiteford was an American politician from Maryland. He served as a member of the Maryland House of Delegates, representing Harford County from 1821 to 1823 and from 1840 to 1843.
