= Forwood =

Forwood is a surname that may refer to:

- Anthony Forwood (real name Ernest Lytton Leslie Forwood) (1915–88), English actor
- Sir Arthur Forwood (1836–98), English merchant and politician (brother of William Bower)
- Bill (William) Forwood (born 1946), Australian politician
- Charles Rossiter Forwood (1826–90), English-born Australian lawyer
- Gareth Forwood (1945–2007), British actor
- Jennifer Forwood (born 1939), English peer
- Samuel Forwood (died 1892), American politician from Alabama
- William Bower Forwood (1840–1928), English merchant and politician (brother of Anthony)
- William H. Forwood (1838–1915), American surgeon

== See also ==
- Forwood baronets
