= Harry D. Gough =

American politician (died 1867)

Member of the Maryland House of Delegates from the Harford County district
- In office 1835–1836 Serving with Stephen Boyd, Israel D. Maulsby, James Nelson, Samuel Sutton

Personal details
- Born: c. 1791
- Died: December 2, 1867 (aged 76) Harford County, Maryland, U.S.
- Party: Whig; Know Nothings; Union; Democratic
- Children: 9, including Charles
- Occupation: Politician

Harry D. Gough (c. 1791 – December 2, 1867) was an American politician from Maryland. He served as a member of the Maryland House of Delegates, representing Harford County from 1835 to 1836.

== Early life ==
Harry D. Gough began his career working on the sea.

== Career ==
Gough was a soldier in Baltimore during the War of 1812.

Gough was originally a Whig. Gough served as a member of the Maryland House of Delegates, representing Harford County from 1835 to 1836. He also served as county commissioner of Harford County. He later was associated with the Know Nothings, Union Party and then the Republican Party.

In 1845, Gough was appointed as clerk of the Harford County Court by Governor Thomas Pratt. He served in that role until 1851. In 1862, Gough was appointed livestock weigher in Baltimore by Governor Augustus Bradford. He served in that role until April 1, 1867. He was also deputy sheriff in Harford County, clerk to the board of county commissioners, school commissioner of Harford County and committee clerk of the state legislature.

== Personal life ==
Gough had nine children, including Charles Hays, Octavia, Matilda, Mary, and Martha C.

Two San Francisco streets – Gough Street and Octavia Street – were named for his children Charles Hays and Octavia.

Gough died on December 2, 1867, about the age of 76, at the home of his son-in-law in Harford County.
