= C. Gus Grason =

American judge (1881–1953)

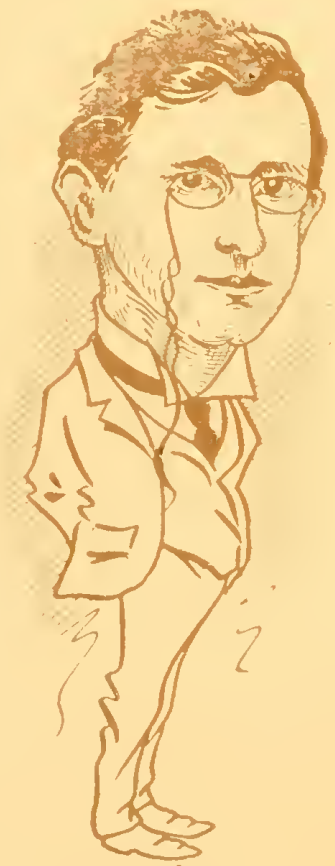
- Caricature of Grason in 1916 publication
- Born: November 8, 1881; Towson, Maryland, U.S.
- Died: February 19, 1953 (aged 71); Towson, Maryland, U.S.
- Resting place: Prospect Hill Cemetery; Towson, Maryland, U.S.
- Education: University of Maryland Law School
- Occupation: Judge
- Spouse: Murial Skipwith Powers (m. 1910)
- Children: 3

C. Gus Grason (November 8, 1881 – February 19, 1953) was a justice of the Maryland Court of Appeals from 1942 to 1951.

Born in Towson, Maryland, to Ida May (née Brown) and John Grason. He was grandson of Maryland judge Richard Grason, Grason received his law degree from the University of Maryland Law School, and gained admission to the Maryland Bar in November 1907. He was an unsuccessful candidate for state's attorney for Baltimore County in 1919, and later served on the Maryland Third Circuit Court of Appeals from 1926 to 1941. His appointment as Chief Judge of that circuit in 1942 automatically placed him on the state's highest court.

On June 4, 1910, Grason married Murial Skipwith Powers, with whom he had a daughter and two sons. Grason died in a nursing home in Towson at the age of 71, following a lengthy battle with failing health. He was buried at Prospect Hill Cemetery in Towson.

Political offices
| Preceded by T. Scott Offutt | Judge of the Maryland Court of Appeals; 1942–1951 | Succeeded by Court reconfigured |
