= Stephen Boyd (Maryland politician) =

American politician

Member of the Maryland House of Delegates from the Harford County district
- In office 1835–1836 Serving with Harry D. Gough, Israel D. Maulsby, James Nelson, Samuel Sutton

Personal details
- Occupation: Politician

Stephen Boyd was an American politician from Maryland. He served as a member of the Maryland House of Delegates, representing Harford County from 1835 to 1836.
