= James Montgomery (American politician) =

American politician and physician (1788–1878)

Member of the Maryland Senate from the Western Shore district
- In office 1831–1836 Serving with John Grant Chapman, Dennis Claude, Benjamin S. Forrest, Charles F. Mayer, John B. Morris, Bene S. Pigman, Thomas Sappington, William T. Wootton, Octavius C. Taney

Member of the Maryland House of Delegates from the Harford County district
- In office 1830–1830 Serving with Frederick T. Amos, James Moores, Stephen Watters
- In office 1824–1827 Serving with Thomas Hope, William Smithson, Samuel Sutton, Alexander Norris, Henry Hall, Charles S. Sewall, James Wray Williams

Personal details
- Born: March 8, 1788 Harford County, Maryland, U.S.
- Died: April 11, 1878 (aged 90) Baltimore, Maryland, U.S.
- Resting place: Rock Spring Church
- Spouse: Caroline A. Kennedy (m. 1831, died)
- Children: 3
- Relatives: John Montgomery
- Education: University of Maryland
- Occupation: Politician; physician; planter

James Montgomery (March 8, 1788 – April 11, 1878) was an American politician and physician from Maryland. He served as a member of the Maryland House of Delegates, representing Harford County, from 1824 to 1827 and in 1830. He served as a member of the Maryland Senate from 1831 to 1836.

== Early life ==
James Montgomery was born on March 8, 1788, in Harford County, Maryland, to Elizabeth (née Vogan) and Thomas Montgomery. His father was a slave owner, Revolutionary War officer, lawyer and landowner. Montgomery was related to Baltimore mayor John Montgomery. He studied medicine under Hugh Whiteford. He then graduated from the University of Maryland.

== Career ==
Montgomery was a surgeon in Captain Macatee's company of the cavalry troops of Colonel Streett. He was present at the Battle of Baltimore in 1814. He was stationed at Patterson's Hill during the bombardment of Fort McHenry.

Montgomery practiced medicine in Harford County for 30 years. He practiced medicine with Francis Butler and later left his practice in Harford County to him. He was also a planter in Harford County for about 8 to 10 years. Montgomery then practiced medicine in Baltimore up until his death. He practiced with at the start of Butler's career.

Montgomery served as a member of the Maryland House of Delegates, representing Harford County, from 1824 to 1827 and in 1830. He was a member of the Maryland Senate, representing the western shore, from 1831 to 1836. He was chairman of the committee on internal improvements and supported the charts of the Baltimore and Ohio Railroad and the Susquehanna Railroad.

Montgomery helped organize Washington Medical College in Baltimore. He served as a trustee and vice president. He participated in Lafayette's visit to the United States.

== Personal life ==
Montgomery married Caroline A. Kennedy, daughter of William Kennedy, on April 7, 1831. They had one son and two daughters. His wife predeceased him. His son practiced medicine in York County, Pennsylvania.

Montgomery died April 11, 1878, at 273 Madison Avenue in Baltimore. He was buried at Rock Spring Church.
