= John C. Polk =

American politician (died 1877)

Member of the Maryland House of Delegates from the Harford County district
- In office 1839–1839 Serving with Thomas Hope, Samuel Sutton, James Wray Williams

Personal details
- Died: October 10, 1877 Abingdon, Maryland, U.S.
- Resting place: St. Mary's Church

John C. Polk (died October 10, 1877) was an American politician from Maryland. He served as a member of the Maryland House of Delegates, representing Harford County in 1839.

== Early life ==
Polk studied medicine under his stepfather Professor Davidge at the University of Maryland School of Medicine.

== Career ==
Polk was a Democrat. Polk served as a member of the Maryland House of Delegates, representing Harford County in 1839. He ran for re-election in 1840, but lost. He was the guano inspector of Baltimore under governor Enoch Louis Lowe.

== Personal life ==
Polk died on October 10, 1877, at the age of 65 or 67, at his home in Abingdon, Maryland. He was buried at St. Mary's Church.
