= Frederick T. Amos =

American politician

Member of the Maryland House of Delegates from the Harford County district
- In office 1844–1844 Serving with Henry W. Archer, William J. Polk, George Yellott
- In office 1830–1831 Serving with Henry H. Johns, James Moores, Samuel Sutton, James Montgomery, Stephen Watters

Personal details
- Party: Whig
- Occupation: Politician

Frederick T. Amos was an American politician from Maryland. He served as a member of the Maryland House of Delegates, representing Harford County, from 1830 to 1831 and in 1844. Amos was a Whig.
