= John I. Yellott =

American scientist (1908–1986)

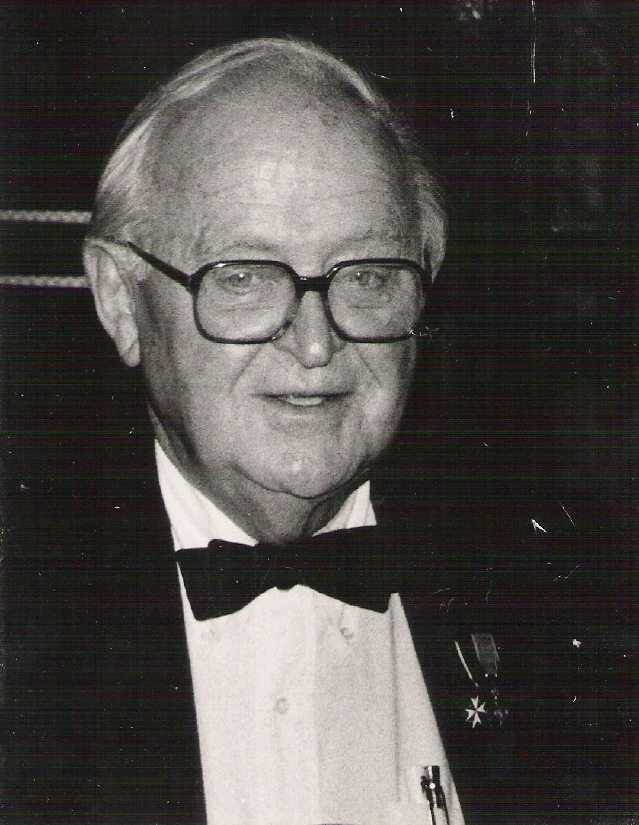
- Born: October 25, 1908; Bel Air, Maryland, U.S.
- Died: December 30, 1986 (aged 78); Phoenix, Arizona, U.S.
- Education: Johns Hopkins University
- Known for: Passive solar technology
- Spouses: Judith Mitchell Williams (m. 1934, divorced); Barbara Leslie Jordan (m. 1951)
- Children: 2
- Relatives: John I. Yellott (grandfather)
- Scientific career
- Fields: Solar engineering
- Workplaces: Manhattan Project; University of Rochester; Arizona State University; Yellott Solar Laboratories

John Ingle Yellott (October 25, 1908 – December 30, 1986) was an American engineer recognized as a pioneer in passive solar energy, and an inventor with many patents to his credit. In his honor the American Society of Mechanical Engineers (ASME) Solar Division confers a biannual "John I. Yellott Award" which "recognizes ASME members who have demonstrated sustained leadership within the Solar Energy Division, have a reputation for performing high-quality solar energy research and have made significant contributions to solar engineering through education, state or federal government service or in the private sector."

== Early life, education, academia, and war service ==
John Ingle Yellott was born in Bel Air, Maryland, the son of the Reverend Dr. John I. (1873-1935) and Mildred Walker Nelson Yellott (1876-1954). His grandfather was John I. Yellott. He was educated at Bel Air High School and at Episcopal High School in Alexandria, Virginia, and then studied Mechanical Engineering at Johns Hopkins University, receiving his M.E. in 1931 and his M.M.E. with distinction in 1933.

Yellott embarked on a career in academia at the Stevens Institute of Technology, Hoboken, and at Illinois Institute of Technology, where he was chairman of the Department of Mechanical Engineering from 1940 to 1943 and director of the Institute of Gas Technology from 1943 to 1945. During World War II he was assigned to the Manhattan Project to work on the development of atomic weapons as a consultant to the Metallurgical Laboratory of the University of Chicago.

== Changing fields ==
After the War Yellott served as director of Research, Locomotive Development Committee, Bituminous Coal Research, from 1945 until 1955. In 1955, at age 47, after having already achieved recognition in steam, coal, gas, and nuclear energy, he switched fields—to passive solar energy. Yellott said the change resulted from "the realization that the entire world, and the United States in particular, was running out of fluid fuels, and that we must find a way to gain economic access to the limitless energy of the sun." In a 1974 interview with Popular Science Magazine, Yellott said he anticipated that soon "[t]he inexorable forces of economics will bring about the age of solar energy." He organized the 1957 Living with the Sun competition, a seminal event in the history of the solar house.

== Industrial consulting and return to academia ==
In June 1958 Yellott founded John Yellott Engineering Laboratories, and the Yellott Solar Energy Laboratory, in Phoenix, Arizona. He became an industrial consultant, with a primary focus on reflective glazing. He served as headmaster and then director of Development for Phoenix Country Day School, and taught environmental control systems at the College of Architecture at Arizona State University. As the first Chairman of the ASME Solar Energy Applications Group (later Solar Energy Division) he was in a position of leadership "that was critical to the official 'rediscovery' of solar energy following the 1973 oil crisis". Soon after the oil crisis, Arizona State's College of Architecture instituted a solar program and chose Yellott as its head; he continued to teach there until his retirement at age 70.

== Solar engineering ==
Yellott's early interest, the source of much consulting work, was on the transparency and transmissivity of glass. In 1960s he helped to develop the solar heat gain factor (SHGF) method of calculating the passive thermal role of glass, now the standard method accepted by the American Society of Heating, Refrigerating and Air-Conditioning Engineers. He served as a consultant to major industrial concerns such as Corning Glass, PPG Industries, Libbey-Owen-Ford Glass company, Shatterprufe Glass Company of Port Elizabeth, South Africa; and Pilkington Brothers Glass Company of Great Britain. One of Yellott's clients was Northrup, Inc. whose founder Leonard L. Northrup Jr. was introduced to solar technology by Yellott, and whose company went on to develop some of the first solar air conditioning systems and heliostats, under Yellott's on-going advice.

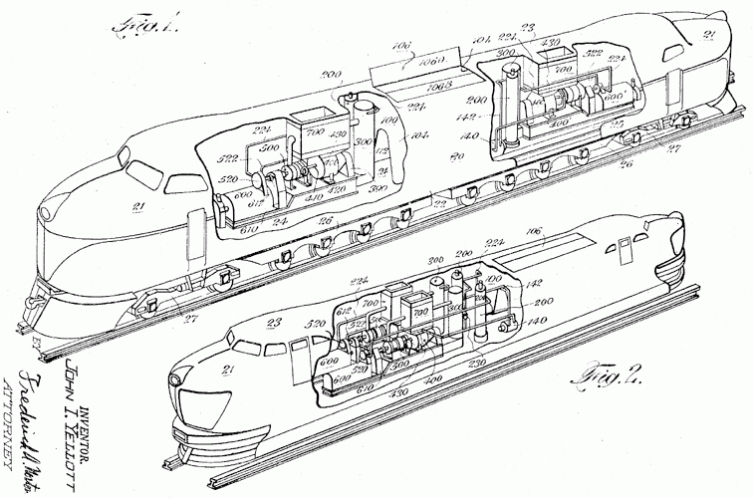
Design sketch from Yellott's patent for a coal-injected turbine locomotive

According to his Illinois Institute of Technology Hall of Fame entry, Yellott's work resulted in more than fifty patents, such as an electric locomotive with a coal fired gas turbine using pulverized coal directly injected into a combustion chamber; a film-type solar water heater and a transparent cover to heat swimming pools by trapping solar radiation Yellott's pool cover idea remains in commercial use to this day. He also contributed his solar expertise to civic projects such as the landmark Carefree Sundial in Carefree, Arizona.

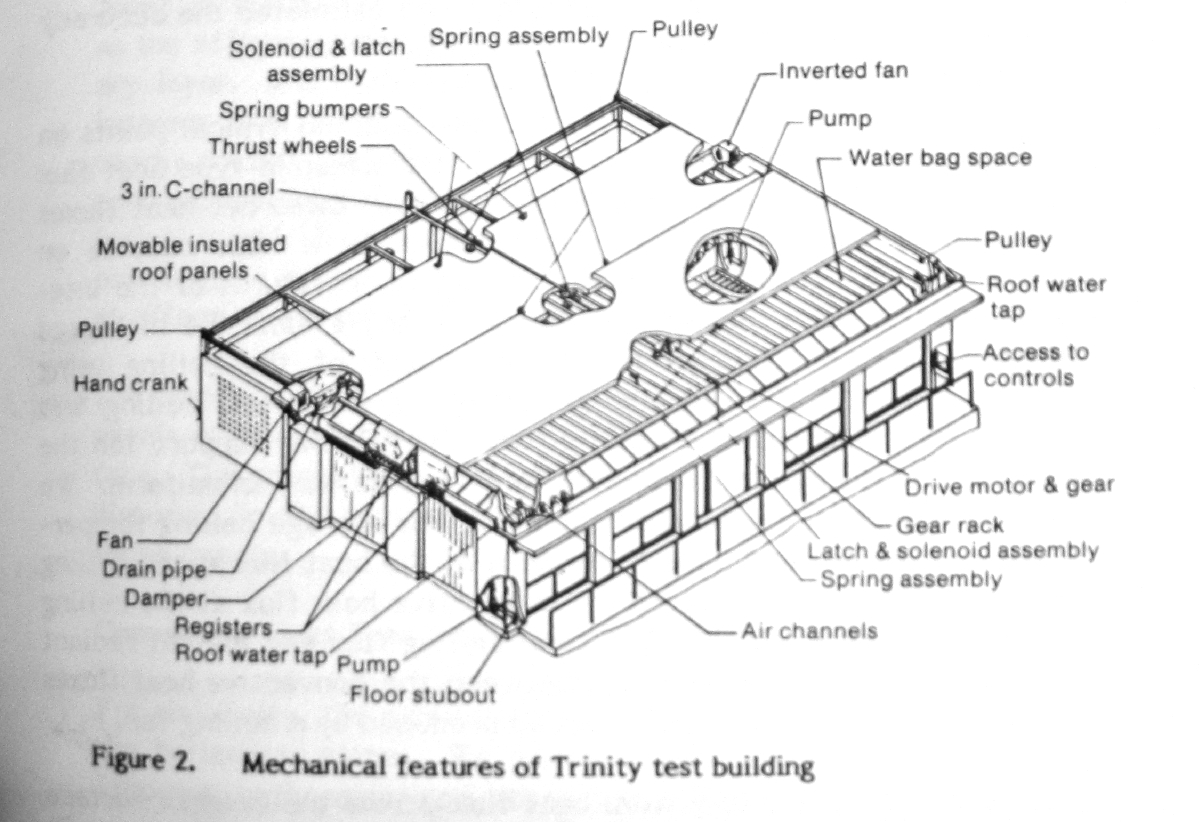
Sketch of full scale roofpond apparatus experiment at Trinity University, Texas

Yellott pioneered passive solar cooling as a field parallel to solar heating, with particular attention to water spray and controlled evaporation. As with any innovator, not all experiments met with success.

Yellott's collaboration with solar entrepreneur Harold Hay on developing an evaporative solar system called a roofpond, which Yellott considered "the simplest system which can accomplish both heating and cooling with the same equipment," proved to be not so simple. The experiments at Yellott's laboratory encountered obstacles such as the unexpected "healthy growth of 'wrigglers' within plastic-enclosed water" from the city mains; then "a pair of nesting birds was attracted to the comfort of a projecting portion of the roofpond. . . ." The researchers eliminated the unwelcome 'wrigglers' as well as a prolific growth of algae with chemical treatment; they considered the "cheerfulness of the birds a pleasant relief from the drudgery of data-collection," but recommended "preventive measures for those not wanting such company."

Yellott's and Hay's experiments did prove the roofpond concept technically feasible, later confirmed with expanded testing on dormitory roofs at Trinity University in Texas. Nonetheless, in the words of solar scientist Kenneth Haggard of the San Luis Obsispo Solar Group, implementation of the idea of maintaining a large puddle of water on one's roof to cool the interior "awaits the next period of blossoming of passive solar architecture." (Hay defended roofponds, acknowledging that while a roofpond design error proved "highly expensive to a young architect and his client," nonetheless there is an "unnecessary fear of having bodies of water overhead." Hay also noted that a review of all roofpond installations in the United States concluded the roofpond "outperforms any other single passive system in both heating and cooling modes" and opined "It may be DOE's best kept-secret buried under hundreds of reports.")

Yellott's achievements particularly in the area of glazing and solar radiation capture have stood the test of time. According to Dr. Jeffrey Cook, College of Architecture and Design, Arizona State University, writing the introduction to the Passive Solar Journal's John I. Yellott Memorial issue, "he made major contributions in areas of basic research, instrumentation, analytic methods, applications, collaboration, education, and demonstration." Cook also wrote: "[h]e published no definitive book," but "[a]rticles bearing Yellott's name will remain classics in solar energy literature;" he "developed no distinctive demonstration, no outrageous solar machine, and no landmark building or award winning engineering system," yet "as a consultant he influenced such major architectural feats as the St. Louis Arch and the new Hong Kong and Shanghai Bank;" his analysis "contributed to the industry development of architectural glasses . . . that have gained worldwide use." His pervasive influence in solar science is largely found in the ongoing work of others, as "he was a mentor to architects, inventors, and students." "Thus," Cook concluded, “as gentle and persuasive as the sun, Yellott touched many people and places."

Yellott died of a heart attack in Phoenix in 1986, survived by his (second) wife Barbara, a son and a daughter, two stepsons and six grandchildren.

== Bibliography ==
Yellott's papers are kept at the American Heritage Center at the University of Wyoming.

Yellott published hundreds of articles, papers, and addresses. A selected list of 120 just in solar energy can be found at Passive Solar Journal Vol. 4, No. 3, 1987 pg. 329 et seq., from which the following representative sample is drawn:

- Energy for our Future, San Francisco: The American Society of Planning Officials, March 20, 1957, 20 pp.
- Solar Energy Utilization in North America, World Power Conference, Canadian Section Meeting, Montreal, 1958.
- On Solar Energy Pioneers, Solar Energy, Vol. 6, No. 3, 1962 p. 112.
- Nocturnal Heat Loss from Horizontal Surfaces on Arid Regions, Proc. United Nations Conf. on New Sources of Energy (Rome, Aug 21, 1961) vol. 4, 1964, p. 481 (P. Kokoropoulos, coauthor)
- Solar Energy, Utilization Of, Encyclopædia Britannica, 14th Ed., Chicago 1967 p 854-56
- New Developments in Architectural Glass, International Congress on the Sun in the Service of Mankind, UNESCO House, Paris, 1973.
- Solar energy utilization for heating and cooling, NSF-74-41. Washington, D.C.: U.S Government Printing Office, Stock No. 3800-00188, 1974.
- Solar radiation and the atmosphere, Passive Solar Heating and Cooling. LA-6637.6 Los Alamos, NM: Los Alamos Scientific Laboratory, 1976, pp. 7–16.
- Construction and operation of a naturally air-conditioned building. Paper 68-WA/Sol 2; ASME Winer Annual Meeting (American Society of Mechanical Engineers)(co-authored with Harod Hay)
- Utilization of sun and sky radiation for heating and cooling buildings. ASHRAE Journal 15 (Dec.) 31-42(1973).
- The Fundamentals of Solar Technology, NASA Contract NAS8-31293, Huntsville, Al.(1979)

== Awards, honors, and tributes ==
- The Most Excellent Order of the British Empire, Member, civil division
- Solar Hall of Fame, inaugural inductee in 1976.
- The Most Venerable Order of the Hospital of St John of Jerusalem, Associate Commander
- Illinois Institute of Technology Hall of Fame
- Fellow of ASME, ASHRAE, AAAS, and the Arizona Academy of Science
- Benjamin Franklin Fellow, Royal Society of Arts, London
- Honorary doctorate conferred by Arizona State University 1985
- John I Yellott, Ambassador of the Sun, Proc. 12th National Passive Solar Conf., Boulder, Co. American Solar Energy Society, 1987 pp 1–8 (J. Cook, author)
- John Yellott: A Tribute, Solar Today, Vol. 1, No. 1, Jan/Feb. 1987. pp 4–5 9J. (J. Cook, author).
- Editorial: Remembering John Yellott. Passive Solar Journal, Vol. 3, No. 4, 1986, p. 327 (R.W. Jones, author).
- In Memoriam; John Ingle Yellott. SunWorld, Vol. 11, No. 2, 1987, pp. 32–33 (B. Yellot, author).
- In Memoriam: Dr. John Yellott 1908-1986. Solar Energy, Vol. 30, No. 6., 1987. pp. 387–388 9P.( Glasser, author).
- The American Solar Energy Society confers annually a John and Barbara Yellott Award to a graduate student concentrating on solar energy.
- The "Yellott Number" for characterising Thermosiphon solar water heaters is named in his honor.

== See also ==
- Solar architecture
- Solar design
- Passive Solar
- Passive cooling
- Cool roof
- Leonard L. Northrup Jr.
