= T. Scott Offutt =

American judge (1872–1943)

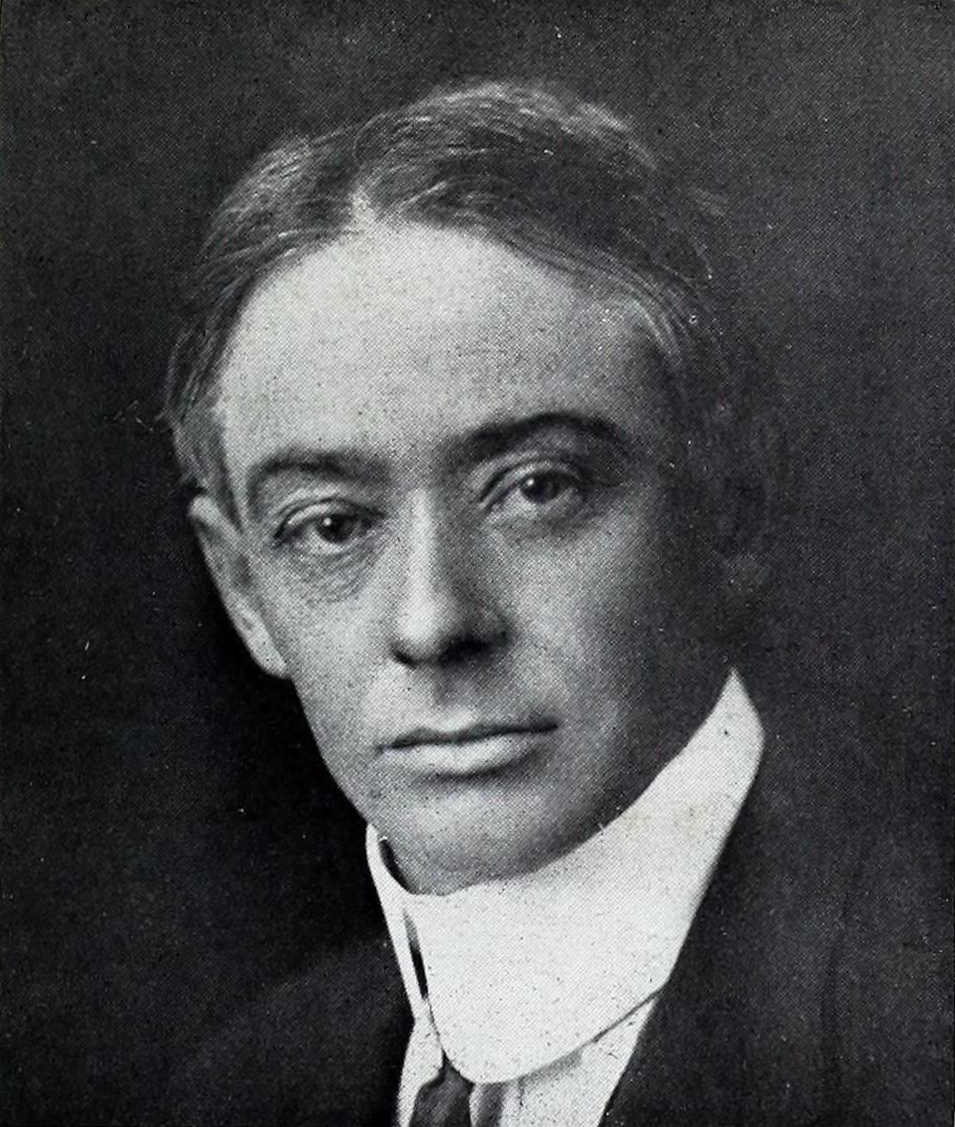
Portrait of Offutt published in Distinguished Men of Baltimore and of Maryland (1914)

Thiemann Scott Offutt (June 12, 1872 – December 24, 1943) was an American lawyer who served as a justice of the Maryland Court of Appeals from 1920 to 1942.

== Early life, education, and career ==
Born in Montgomery County, Maryland, on the large farm of William Scott and Henrietta (Baker) Offutt, he attended the local public schools before entering the University of Virginia in 1891 and attending for two years, and also attending St. John's College in Annapolis. He read law under the supervision of his cousin, Milton W. Offutt, also working as a correspondent for the Baltimore Morning Herald during this time. Offutt gained admission to the bar in 1898, and thereafter practiced law in Maryland for 22 years, first continuing to work with his cousin, and then in association with John I. Yellott and Osborne I. Yellott. He was reported to have "practiced law extensively as a trial lawyer".

== Judicial service ==
On March 27, 1920, Governor Albert Ritchie appointed Offutt to a seat on the Maryland Court of Appeals, then the highest court in the state, vacated by the retirement of Justice Nicholas Charles Burke. Offutt was sworn in on April 6, 1920. While serving on the bench, he also served as president of the Maryland State Bar Association, from 1923 to 1924, and published Offutt's Code of Local Laws, codifying the local laws of Baltimore County, in 1929.

Offutt retired from the bench on June 12, 1942, having reached the mandatory retirement age of 70, and experiencing poor health.

== Personal life and death ==
In addition to his legal work, Offutt enjoyed riding horses, serving in the historic cavalry and artillery unit known as "the old Troop A" in Pikesville.

Offutt married Lydia Trail Yellott, daughter of John I. Yellott, with whom he had three children.

In the late 1930s, his son John I. Yellott Offutt died by drowning in Ocean City, Maryland, and not long after, Offutt had a stroke that left him partially paralyzed. He died three and a half years later in Baltimore, Maryland, after several bouts of pneumonia, at the age of 71, and was interred in Prospect Hill Cemetery in Towson, Maryland.

Political offices
| Preceded by Nicholas Charles Burke | Judge of the Maryland Court of Appeals; 1920–1942 | Succeeded by C. Gus Grason |
