= Curtis Mathes Corporation =

North American electronics retailer based in Garland, Texas

Curtis Mathes, Inc.
- Industry: Electronics
- Founded: 1957 - Relaunched in 2013
- Founder: George Curtis Mathes
- Headquarters: 6201 Technology Drive, Frisco, TX 75033,
- Key people: Eric Hill, Paul Williams, Michael Chester, Joseph Kupke
- Products: LED Lighting
- Parent: Connor and Mathes (est. 1919)
- Website: CurtisMathes.com

Curtis Mathes, Inc., is a North American electronics retailer initially based in Garland, Texas, and specializing in the sale of private label brand electronics and repair services. It manufactured its own brand of televisions in Athens, Texas, until July 31, 1982; ten years later, it filed for Chapter 11 bankruptcy and reorganization which allowed it to stay in business and use future earnings to pay off creditors. The company is now based in Frisco, Texas.

Known for its commercials touting its televisions as the "most expensive television set in America, and darn well worth it", the company was credited with introducing longer warranties to electronics retailing.

== History ==
=== Early products ===
The Curtis Mathes Corporation started in 1919 as Connor and Mathes, a manufacturer and retailer of automobile and tractor parts. By the late 1920s, the company moved into the air conditioning industry. It also manufactured wooden cabinets and eventually furniture, acquiring Hub Furniture in 1942. The leading product through the 1930s and '40s was electrical fans, many styles built into custom cabinets and permanent-type window fans. In the early '50s the company added a "central" or "attic fan" to its inventory. It pulled air from all open windows into the attic where it also ventilated the attic, making the house much cooler.

As compressors were commercially introduced in the late '40s, Curtis Mathes' Fort Worth factory began making a wide variety of compressors that could be used in cars or buildings. Leonard L. Northrup, Jr., became one of the leading distributors of Curtis Mathes Products including developing and selling an add-on air conditioning unit first used in Cadillacs.

By the late 1940s, the Curtis Mathes Company had diversified into radios.

=== Televisions ===
The Curtis Mathes Corporation was founded in 1957 and shortly thereafter entered the television industry, founding plants in Tarrant and Dallas Counties and in Athens, Texas, eventually moving most of its manufacturing to a huge Athens facility. From 1968 to 1988 it was one of three fully American-owned electronics firms and manufacturers (along with RCA and GE).

In the late 1960s, Leonard L. Northrup, Jr., bought a controlling interest in Donmark Corporation, a manufacturer of residential air conditioning and heating equipment from his lifelong friend Curtis Mathes, Sr., as Curtis Mathes moved toward electronics.

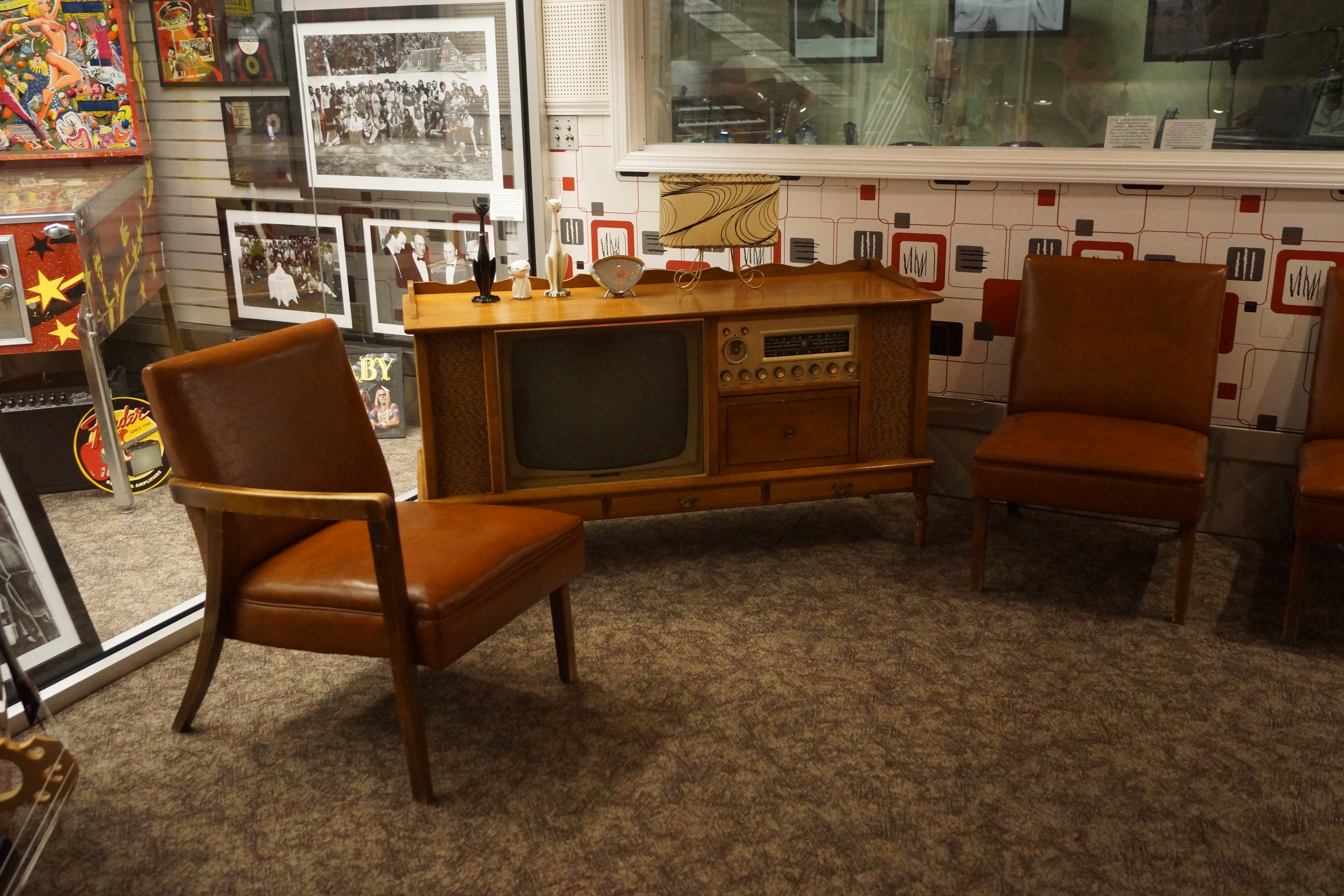
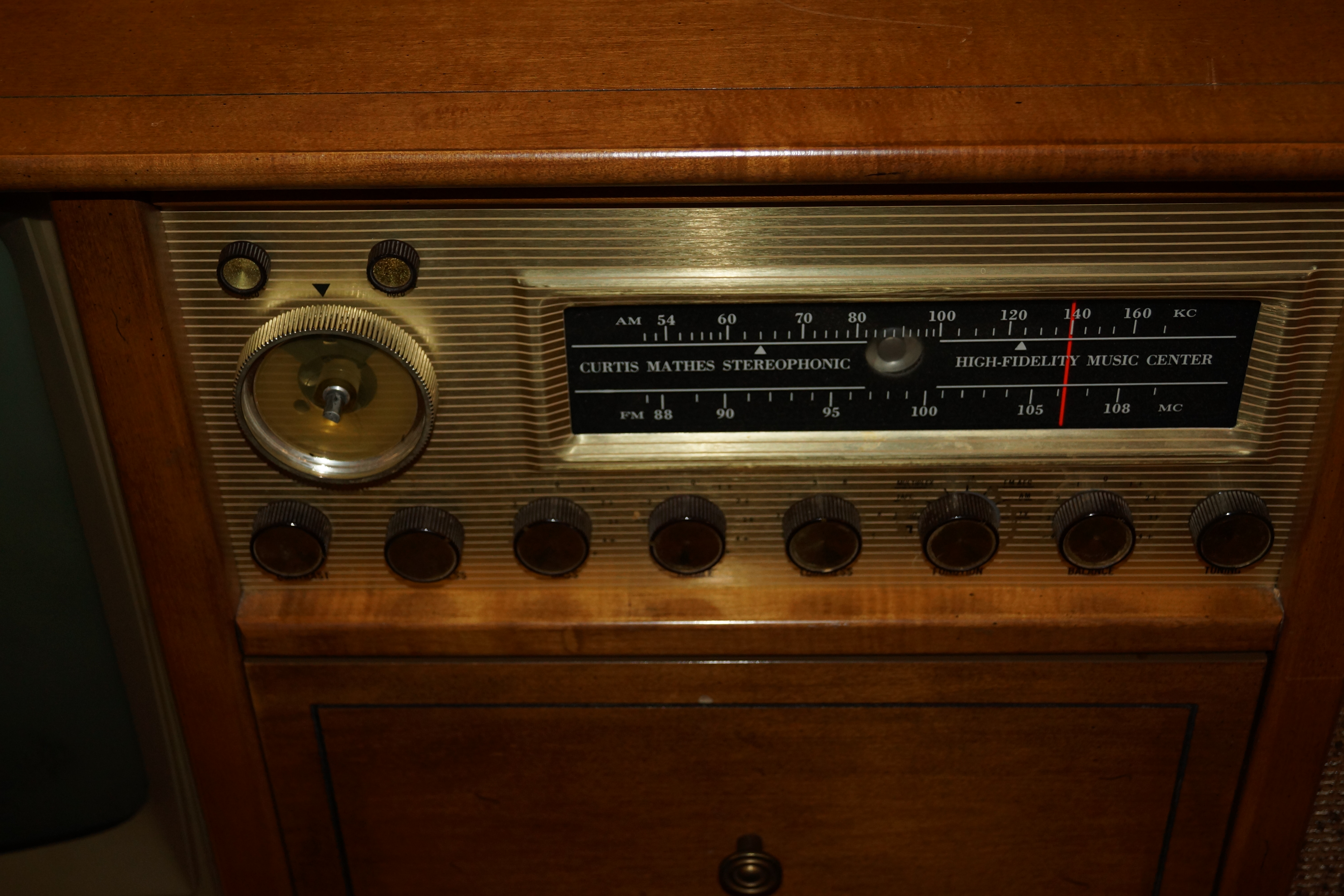
Curtis Mathes Stereophonic High-Fidelity Music Center (exhibited at Norman & Vi Petty Rock & Roll Museum)

During the next few years Curtis Mathes worked to design a modular TV and modular TV parts and chassis, so that warranty service would involve quickly switching a part, tube, tuner or picture tube. These all had snap-in connectors and were held in place by brackets instead of solder or screws. He envisioned a TV that would never require costly repairs, and early on started offering a 4-year warranty on picture tube, parts and labor.

By the mid-1970s and the advent of solid-state electronics, Mathes had achieved results. The TV consisted of 11 parts: 7 circuit boards, a tuner, a picture tube, a transformer, and the cabinet. A repair person carried all ten electronic parts in their truck and a repair call seldom lasted more than 20 minutes. In home the fee was $20, and free in the shop.

Curtis Mathes TVs that were used for rentals (such as ColorTyme) were sometimes rebranded "Rutherford".

Curtis Mathes, Sr., died in 1977. Curtis Mathes, Jr., became the chairman of the board and the company's public face, appearing in its television commercials until his 1983 death in the Air Canada Flight 797 fire at Cincinnati/Northern Kentucky International Airport.

The company began to decline, going from a peak of 5,000 employees and seven manufacturing facilities to about 50 employees in 1988 when it was sold to Enhanced Electronics. At the time of this sale, the GE/RCA television division was also sold to French firm Thomson SA.

For a time, the company sold equipment sourced from Matsushita, Pioneer, Thomson, Samsung, Daewoo, Toshiba, and other manufacturers.

== 2000s ==
In the late 1990s to early 2000s, the Curtis Mathes brand became an in-house brand for the Kmart discount chain. As of late 2007, Curtis Mathes had re-emerged with products marketed at several discount retailers such as Wal-Mart, Sam's Club, Meijer and Target. Beginning in 2013, Curtis Mathes expanded its portfolio into LED lighting.
