= Charles Hays Gough =

American politician (1828–1895)

Alderman for the City of San Francisco
- In office 1854–1854

Member of San Francisco Board of Supervisors
- In office 1855–1855

Chairman of San Francisco Land Commission
- In office 1856–1857

Member of California State Assembly
- In office 1877–1878

Personal details
- Born: 1828 Bel Air, Maryland, US
- Died: July 25, 1895 San Francisco, California, US
- Party: Democratic
- Parent: Harry D. Gough (father)
- Occupation: Contractor, politician

Charles Hays Gough (/ɡɒf/ GOFF, 1828 – July 25, 1895) was an American pioneer, known for his contributions to the early development of San Francisco. (Note: In his 1878 book, R. R. Parkinson mistakenly referred to Gough as Charles R. Gough.)

== Career in San Francisco ==
Upon his arrival, Gough began working as a milkman, delivering milk on horseback through the streets of San Francisco. By 1855, he had become a prominent member of the community and held various roles in the city's governance. He served as an Alderman for the City and County of San Francisco and as a member of the San Francisco County Board of Supervisors. Gough was a member of the Committees on Fish and Game, Public Morals and Public Printing. From 1856 to 1857, he was the chairman of the San Francisco Land Commission, tasked with naming the streets in the Western Addition. He named Gough Street after himself and Octavia Street after his sister. It is believed that he named Steiner Street after his friend, L. Steiner, a water delivery man.

== Later life and death ==
Despite his early fame, Gough's later years were marked by financial difficulties. He died in poverty on July 25, 1895, in San Francisco at the City and County Hospital. His obituary stated that Charles H. Gough "was a liberal man, spending his money in an open-handed way and helping friends in need. He died poor, having, like many pioneers, lost his property in unfortunate litigation..."

== Personal life ==
Gough never married. Journalist R. R. Parkinson described him as "genial gentleman, with a big soul and well proportioned body of no small dimensions". He was an organizer and served as president of the Society of Old Friends for ten years. He was an Argonaut, a member of the elite Pioneer Association of San Francisco, an organization composed of men who had arrived in the city by 1849.

== Legacy ==
Charles H. Gough's contributions to the development of San Francisco are memorialized in the city's geography, with Gough Street and Octavia Street serving as reminders of his role in shaping the city's early infrastructure.
