= Madison Nelson =

American judge

Madison Nelson (1803 – January 1, 1870) was a long-serving judge in Maryland, who was a justice of the Maryland Court of Appeals from 1867 to 1870.

== Biography and career ==
Born in Frederick, Maryland, Nelson was the son of American Revolutionary War hero Roger Nelson. His brother John Nelson served as United States Attorney General. He attended Georgetown College, and thereafter entered the practice of law in Frederick. Nelson was a life-long friend of Thomas Jefferson and "was a Democrat of the old school".

Nelson was elected judge of the third judicial circuit of Maryland (Frederick and Carroll Counties) in 1851 and judge of the fourth judicial circuit (Frederick County) in 1864, and chief judge of the sixth circuit in 1867, by virtue of which he was one of the judges of the court of appeals of Maryland. However, Nelson entered into a period of poor health which afflicted him for the entire length of his service on the court of appeals, at some times preventing him from taking the bench.

== Personal life and death ==
Nelson was raised as an Episcopalian, but converted to Catholicism. He married Josephine Marcilly, with whom he had five sons and three daughters. One son died at the age of fifteen, but the remaining children survived to adulthood and entered various professions. Nelson died in Frederick, Maryland, after a lengthy illness.

Political offices
Preceded by Newly reconfigured court	Judge of the Maryland Court of Appeals; 1867–1870	Succeeded by William P. Maulsby
