= Samuel Sutton (American politician) =

American politician (died 1878)

Member of the Maryland House of Delegates from the Harford County district
- In office 1839–1841 Serving with Charles D. Bouldin, Thomas Hope, Henry H. Johns, C. W. Billingslea, William Whiteford, John C. Polk, James Wray Williams
- In office 1831–1836 Serving with Stephen Boyd, Harry D. Gough, James Nelson, Henry H. Johns, James Moores, John Forwood, Thomas Hope, Frederick T. Amos
- In office 1826–1829 Serving with Thomas Hope, Henry H. Johns, James Moores, William Smithson, James Montgomery, Alexander Norris

Personal details
- Born: c. 1795
- Died: March 8, 1878 (aged 83) Baltimore, Maryland, U.S.
- Resting place: Spesutia Church
- Occupation: Politician

Samuel Sutton (c. 1795 – March 8, 1878) was an American politician from Maryland. He served as a member of the Maryland House of Delegates, representing Harford County, from 1826 to 1829, from 1831 to 1836 and from 1839 to 1841.

== Career ==
Sutton volunteered in the War of 1812. He was stationed at Camp Severn in Annapolis and contracted camp fever. He briefly left service, but returned. Sutton served under Colonel John Streett and was present at the Battle of Baltimore.

Sutton served as a member of the Maryland House of Delegates, representing Harford County, from 1826 to 1829, from 1831 to 1836 and from 1839 to 1841. He was a member of the "Glorious Nineteen" in 1836. He also served as a member of the constitutional convention in 1851.

== Personal life ==
Sutton died on March 8, 1878, at the age of 83, at Mount Hope Retreat in Baltimore. He was buried at Spesutia Church.
