= Leopold Steiner =

19th-century American businessman

- Born: February 1826; Bohemia, Austrian Empire
- Died: November 18, 1911 (aged 85); San Francisco, California, U.S.
- Occupation: Businessman
- Known for: Pioneer water delivery in San Francisco
- Relatives: Samuel Steiner (brother)

Leopold Steiner (February 1826 – November 18, 1911) was a Bohemian-born American businessman and civic figure in California. Active in San Francisco and San Diego during the late 19th and early 20th centuries, he was known for delivering drinking water from house to house during California gold rush.

== Early life ==
Steiner was born in Bohemia, then part of the Austrian Empire, to a Jewish family. He emigrated to the United States in 1852, arriving in California during the Gold Rush era. Initially attracted by mining prospects, he settled in San Francisco and Auburn, Placer County.

== Business career ==
In the early years of San Francisco, before the creation of a municipal water supply network, Steiner worked as a waterman, delivering drinking water to households by driving horse-drawn carts through city streets. At the time, the delivery of drinking water by cart was regarded as essential to daily life in San Francisco when alternative sources were limited or unreliable. Later, Leopold Steiner and his brother Samuel Steiner entered the mercantile trade. Samuel relocated to San Diego, where he co-founded Steiner, Klauber & Company with Abraham Klauber. The firm eventually became known as the Simon Levi Company under the management of Leopold's nephew Simon Levi. Leopold Steiner remained primarily based in San Francisco but maintained business connections in Southern California through his family.

== Public service ==
Steiner was a long-time member of the Independent Order of B'nai B'rith, joining the Bay City Lodge in San Francisco around 1851–1852. He was honored as a veteran member, having served for over fifty years. He requested that his funeral be conducted under the auspices of the lodge, a wish that was fulfilled in 1911. He was also active in other fraternal and charitable organizations and was regarded with respect in both San Francisco and San Diego. Steiner was a prominent member of the Odd Fellows and was honored in San Francisco with the presentation of a jewel recognizing his long service and loyalty to the order.

== Personal life and death ==
Leopold Steiner was married to Julia Steiner, who died in 1904. He had 3 children: Tillie, Anna, and Sig. Steiner retired from active business in the early 1900s. He died at his home at 1573 Laguna Street, San Francisco, on November 18, 1911, at the age of 85, following a short illness. His funeral was conducted by Bay City Lodge of B'nai B'rith.

== Legacy ==
The Steiner family name is memorialized in Steiner Street, a major thoroughfare in the city's Western Addition, which was developed from sand hills and sheep pasture in the late 19th century. The name is often mentioned along with fellow pioneer Charles Hays Gough, a city assessor and member of the California State Assembly. Both Steiner and Gough are recognized among the early civic figures whose names were preserved in San Francisco's street map. During the same period that Steiner worked as a waterman, Gough was delivering milk to the households and Gough Street is named after him.
