= James Moores =

American politician

Member of the Maryland Senate
- In office 1844–1849
- Preceded by: Otho Scott
- Succeeded by: Henry D. Farnandis
- Constituency: Harford County

Member of the Maryland House of Delegates from the Harford County district
- In office 1833–1834 Serving with Henry H. Johns, James Nelson, Samuel Sutton
- In office 1829–1831 Serving with Frederick T. Amos, Henry H. Johns, Samuel Sutton, James Montgomery, Stephen Watters, Thomas Hope

Personal details
- Party: Whig

James Moores was an American politician from Maryland. He served as a member of the Maryland House of Delegates from 1829 to 1831 and 1833 to 1834 and as a member of the Maryland Senate from 1844 to 1849.

== Career ==
Moores served as a member of the Maryland House of Delegates from 1829 to 1831 and 1833 to 1834. Moores served as a member of the Maryland Senate from 1844 to 1849. Moores was a Whig.
