= Abraham J. Streett =

American politician

Member of the Maryland House of Delegates from the Harford County district
- In office 1845–1845 Serving with Benedict H. Hanson, Henry H. Johns, William B. Stephenson

Personal details
- Occupation: Politician

Abraham J. Streett was an American politician from Maryland. He served as a member of the Maryland House of Delegates, representing Harford County in 1845.
