= William L. Forwood =

American politician

William S. Forwood

Member of the Maryland House of Delegates from the Harford County district
- In office 1837–1837 Serving with Israel D. Maulsby, James Wray Williams, James Nelson

Personal details
- Occupation: Politician

William L. Forwood was an American politician from Maryland. He served as a member of the Maryland House of Delegates, representing Harford County in 1837.
