= Richard Dallam =

American politician (1865–1939)

Secretary of State of Maryland
- In office 1896–1899
- Governor: Lloyd Lowndes Jr.
- Preceded by: Edwin Gott
- Succeeded by: George E. Loweree

Personal details
- Born: May 11, 1865 Bel Air, Maryland, U.S.
- Died: April 11, 1939 (aged 73) Bel Air, Maryland, U.S.
- Resting place: Rock Spring Cemetery
- Party: Republican
- Spouse: Josephine R. Evans (m. 1892)
- Children: 4
- Relatives: Israel D. Maulsby (grandfather); William P. Maulsby (uncle); John I. Yellott (cousin)
- Education: University of Maryland School of Law
- Occupation: Politician; lawyer

Richard Dallam (May 11, 1865 – April 11, 1939) was an American politician from Maryland. He served as Secretary of State of Maryland from 1896 to 1899.

== Early life ==
Richard Dallam was born on May 11, 1865, in Bel Air, Maryland, to Mary C. (née Maulsby) and William H. Dallam. His father was state's attorney, deputy collector at the Port of Baltimore, and veteran of the Civil War. Dallam's maternal grandfather was Israel D. Maulsby, state delegate of Harford County. His uncle was William P. Maulsby and cousin was John I. Yellott. He attended Bel Air Academy and graduated from the University of Maryland School of Law in 1888.

== Career ==
After graduating, Dallam practiced law in Bel Air. He was appointed as deputy of the Baltimore customs house under Colonel Webster. He served in that role until 1889. He then continued his law practice.

Dallam was a Republican. In 1896, he was appointed as Secretary of State of Maryland by Governor Lloyd Lowndes Jr. He served in that role until 1899.

Dallam was president of the Harford County Mutual Fire Insurance Company from 1894 to 1939. He was treasurer of the Bel Air Water Works Company. He was head of Smith-Webster Company, a canned goods brokerage firm. He was a director of the Second National Bank.

== Personal life ==
On November 23, 1892, Dallam married Josephine R. Evans, daughter of Dr. John Evans, of Port Deposit. They had four children, Rebecca, Mary, Richard Jr. and John Evans. He was a member of the Emmanuel Protestant Episcopal Church in Bel Air.

Dallam died on April 11, 1939, at his home on Broadway in Bel Air. He was buried at Rock Spring Cemetery.
