= Osborne I. Yellott =

American politician and lawyer (1871–1922)

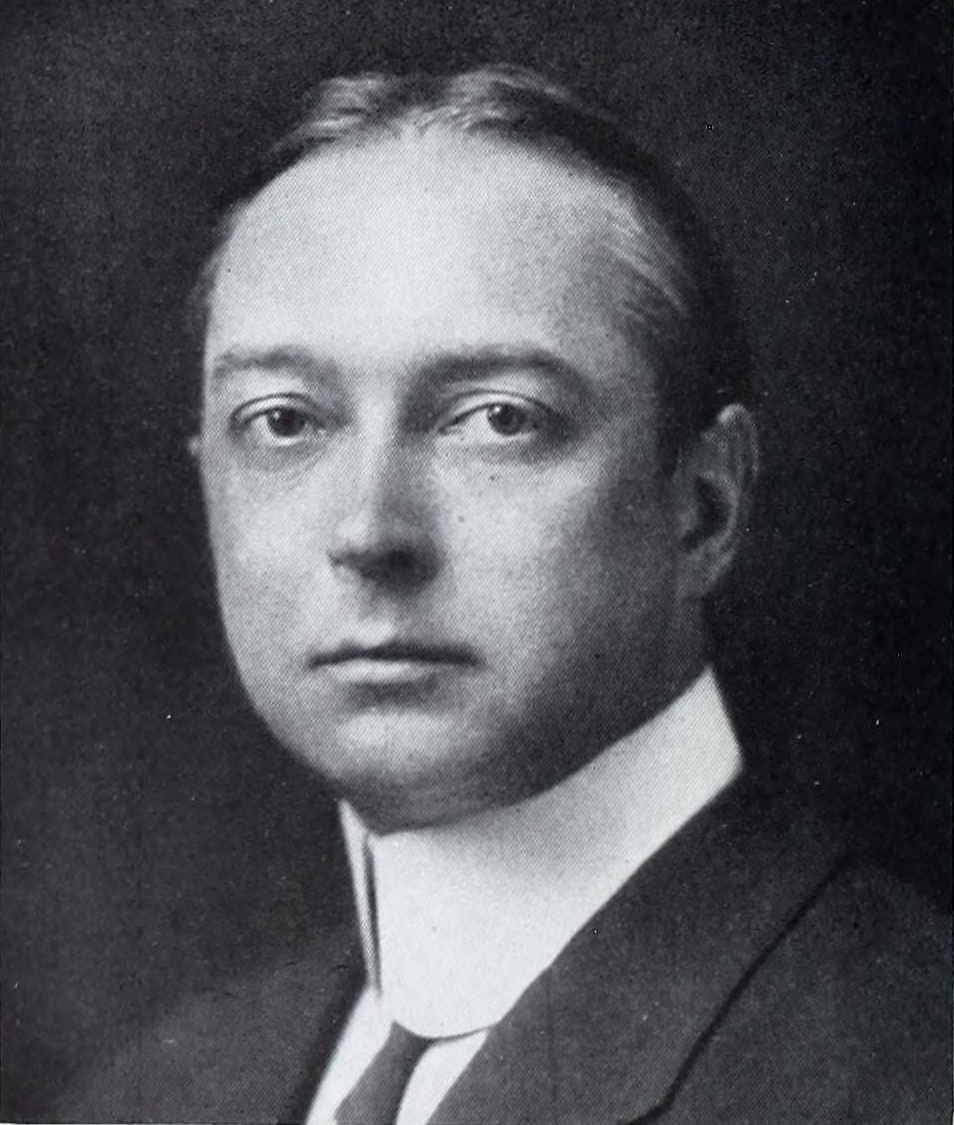

Member of the Maryland House of Delegates from the Baltimore County district
- In office 1894–1894 Serving with John C. Bosley, Thomas G. Carter, James B. Councilman, George S. Kieffer, Frederick S. Myerly

Personal details
- Born: Osborne Ingle Yellott; January 1, 1871 Towson, Maryland, U.S.
- Died: March 19, 1922 (aged 51) Baltimore, Maryland, U.S.
- Resting place: Prospect Hill Cemetery; Towson, Maryland, U.S.
- Party: Democratic
- Spouse: Louise Cole Powers (m. 1897)
- Parent: John I. Yellott (father)
- Relatives: Coleman Yellott (grand-uncle); William P. Maulsby (grand-uncle)
- Education: St. John's College; University of Maryland School of Law
- Occupation: Politician; lawyer

Osborne Ingle Yellott (January 1, 1871 – March 19, 1922) was an American politician and lawyer from Maryland. He served as a member of the Maryland House of Delegates, representing Baltimore County in 1894.

== Early life ==
Osborne Ingle Yellott was born on January 1, 1871, in Towson, Maryland, to John I. Yellott. His grand-uncles were George Yellott and William P. Maulsby, both judges of the court of appeals. He was also grand-nephew of Coleman Yellott. Yellott graduated from the public school in Towson and attended Major Wilburn B. Hall's private school in Baltimore for two years. Yellott graduated from St. John's College in Annapolis in 1891. He left St. John's briefly in his junior year and worked for a paper in Washington, D.C., before returning to finish his degree. He graduated with a law degree from the University of Maryland School of Law. He was admitted to the bar in 1892.

== Career ==
Yellott practiced law with his father and T. Scott Offutt, the latter of whom went on to serve on the state's supreme court.

Yellott was a Democrat. He served as a member of the Maryland House of Delegates, representing Baltimore County in 1894. In 1920, Yellott was appointed as state employment commissioner by governor Albert Ritchie and was people's counsel for the public service commission.

In 1920, Yellott challenged the police department for "inefficiency in the apprehension of automobile thieves". He worked as an attorney for the Automobile Club and the Real Estate Board. He also worked as counsel for the Chesapeake and Potomac Telephone Company. Yellott was president of St. John's College alumni association. He also was state president of the Sons of the American Revolution.

== Personal life ==
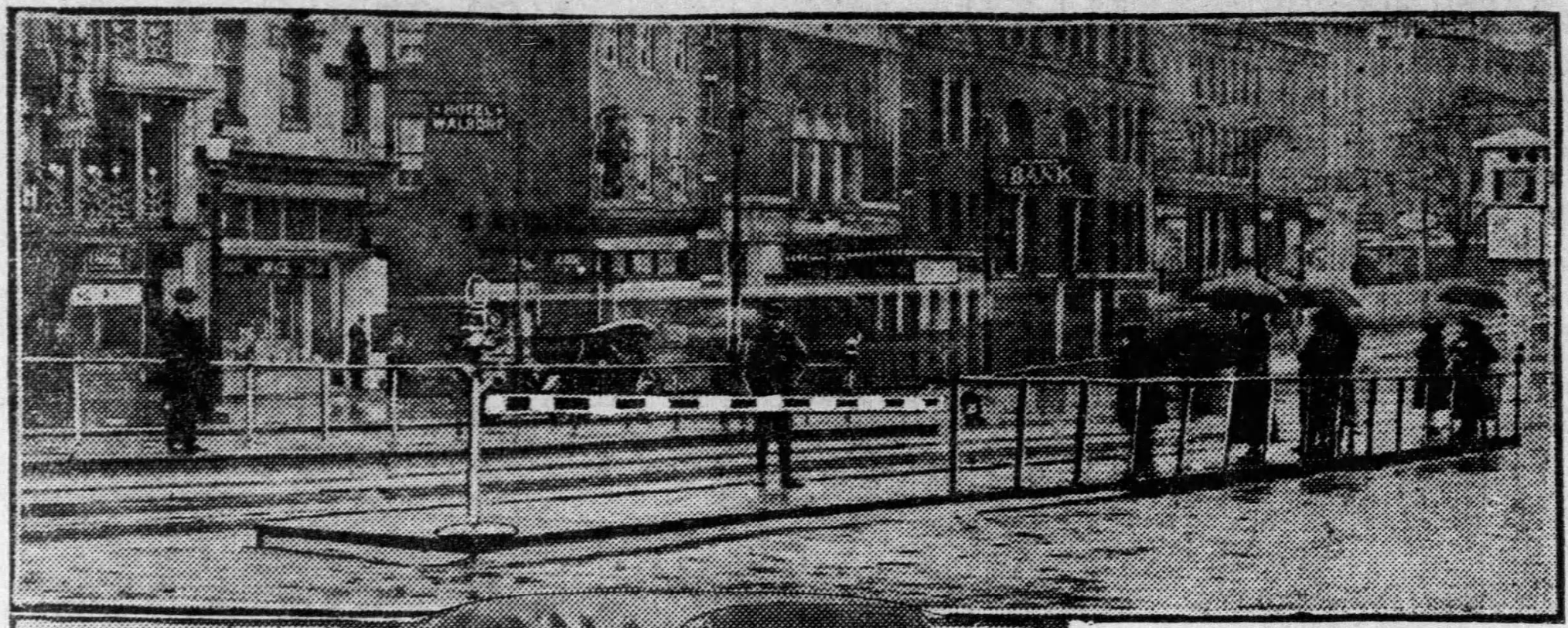
Scene of Yellott's auto accident in Baltimore

Yellott was married Louise Cole Powers, daughter of reverend W. H. H. Powers, on June 17, 1897.

On April 22, 1908, Yellott received burns from a gasoline fire while working on his automobile. Yellott died the morning of March 19, 1922, after his automobile crashed into the safety platform of the United Railways at North Avenue and Charles Street in Baltimore. He was buried at Prospect Hill Cemetery in Towson.
