= Charles D. Bouldin =

American politician, judge and newspaper publisher (died 1882)

Member of the Maryland House of Delegates from the Harford County district
- In office 1841–1841 Serving with Thomas Hope, Henry H. Johns, Samuel Sutton

Personal details
- Born: c. 1796
- Died: September 26, 1882 (aged 86) Jerusalem Mills, Harford County, Maryland, U.S.
- Resting place: Rock Spring Church
- Party: Democratic; Know Nothing; Republican
- Children: 6
- Occupation: Politician; judge; newspaper publisher; hotelier

Charles D. Bouldin (c. 1796 – September 26, 1882) was an American politician, judge, newspaper publisher and hotelier from Maryland. He served as a member of the Maryland House of Delegates, representing Harford County in 1841.

== Career ==
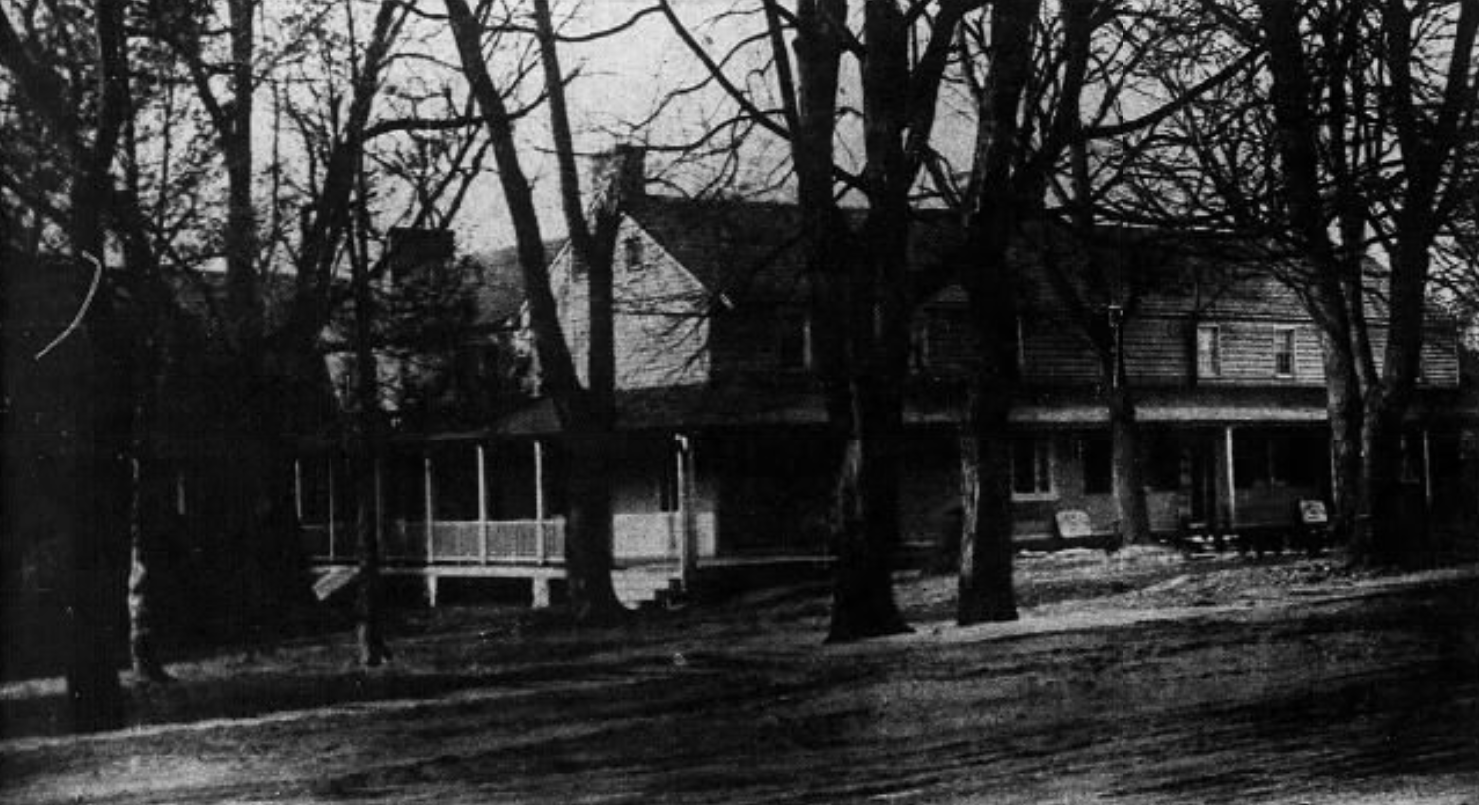
Eagle Hotel (renamed Clubhouse Inn) in 1917

Bouldin worked as a printer. In 1830, he moved with his family from Baltimore to Bel Air. He bought the Bond of Union, the only newspaper in Harford County at the time. He changed the name to the Harford Republican in support of the Democratic Party. He published the Republican until 1849 when he turned over management of the paper to his son William. He then managed the Eagle Hotel in Bel Air.

Bouldin was a Democrat. He later became a Know Nothing. Bouldin served as a member of the Maryland House of Delegates, representing Harford County in 1841. Bouldin served as county commissioner and as judge of the orphans' court. He also served as clerk to the commissioners. After the Know Nothing Party ended, Bouldin became a Republican and was elected as sheriff.

== Personal life ==
Bouldin had two daughters and four sons, William, Charles D., Richard E., Robert R., Mrs. William Galloway and Mrs. N. B. Holland.

Bouldin died on September 26, 1882, at the age of 86, at the home of his son in Jerusalem Mills in Harford County. He was buried at Rock Spring Church.
