= Samuel Forwood =

American politician from Alabama (c. 1798–1892)

Member of the Alabama House of Representatives from the Clarke County district
- In office 1876–1876
- Preceded by: F. W. Baker
- Succeeded by: Frank Winn
- In office 1839–1839
- Preceded by: G. W. Creagh
- Succeeded by: W. F. Jones

Personal details
- Born: c. 1798 Harford County, Maryland, U.S.
- Died: October 27, 1892 (aged 94) Clarke County, Alabama, U.S.
- Spouse(s): Rachael Cooper Stump (m. 1828; died 1830) Martha J. Morriss (m. 1834)
- Children: 11
- Parent: John Forwood (father)
- Occupation: Politician; planter

Samuel Forwood (c. 1798 – October 27, 1892) was an American politician and plantation owner who served in the Alabama House of Representatives, representing Clarke County in 1839 and again in 1876.

== Early life ==
Samuel Forwood was born in Harford County, Maryland, to John Forwood, who served as a member of the Maryland House of Delegates.

== Career ==
In the fall of 1830, Forwood moved to Clarke County, Alabama. In the early 1830s, he founded the plantation Gosport Retreat in Gosport. The name "Gosport" is said to be a contraction of "God's Port." He served as postmaster of Gosport when the post office was established in 1834. Forwood later purchased the estate of Governor John Murphy in Gosport.

Forwood was a slaveholder and owned a plantation throughout the Civil War. After the war, his plantation encompassed approximately 500 acres (200 ha).

Forwood represented Clarke County as a member of the Alabama House of Representatives in 1839 and again in 1876. He also participated in the Alabama constitutional conventions of 1865 and 1875.

He also served as chairman of the Lee Monument Association of Alabama.

== Personal life ==
Forwood married Rachael Cooper Stump of Stafford in 1828. They had one son, W. Stump Forwood. His first wife died in 1830. After relocating to Alabama, he married Martha J. Morriss in 1834. Together, they had ten children. His son, W. Stump Forwood, worked as a physician and founded the Harford Medical Society in Harford County, Maryland.

Forwood resided in Gosport, Alabama. He was a member of the Methodist Church.

Forwood died on October 27, 1892, aged 94, at his plantation in Clarke County.
