= Benedict H. Hanson =

American politician (died 1882)

Member of the Maryland House of Delegates from the Harford County district
- In office 1845–1845 Serving with Henry H. Johns, William B. Stephenson, Abraham J. Streett

Personal details
- Born: c. 1809
- Died: November 1, 1882 (aged 73) near Churchville, Maryland, U.S.
- Resting place: Churchville Presbyterian Church; Churchville, Maryland, U.S.
- Children: 5
- Occupation: Politician

Benedict H. Hanson (c. 1809 – November 1, 1882) was an American politician from Maryland. He served as a member of the Maryland House of Delegates, representing Harford County in 1845.

== Career ==
Benedict H. Hanson served as a member of the Maryland House of Delegates, representing Harford County in 1845. He was appointed as gauger of liquors in Baltimore by the governor. From 1857 to 1867, Hanson served as the register of wills in Harford County. He served as deputy register of wills under W. S. Richardson from 1873 to his death in 1882.

== Personal life ==
Hanson had three sons and two daughters, including Benedict H. Jr, Aquilla B., David H. and Mrs. Frederick Hinkson. Benedict H. Jr. was killed in February 1882 in a hunting accident.

Hanson died from typhoid fever on November 1, 1882, at the age of 73, at his home near Churchville, Maryland. He was buried at Churchville Presbyterian Church.
