= William S. Forwood =

American politician

Member of the Maryland House of Delegates from the Harford County district
- In office 1838–1838 Serving with Thomas Hope, Israel D. Maulsby, James Wray Williams

Personal details
- Occupation: Politician

William S. Forwood was an American politician from Maryland. He served as a member of the Maryland House of Delegates, representing Harford County in 1838.
