= William P. Maulsby =

American politician and judge (1815–1894)

Member of the Maryland Senate from the Carroll County district
- In office 1838–1843
- Preceded by: Office established
- Succeeded by: William Roberts

Personal details
- Born: William Pinkney Maulsby; July 10, 1815 Bel Air, Maryland, U.S.
- Died: October 3, 1894 (aged 79) Westminster, Maryland, U.S.
- Resting place: Mount Olivet Cemetery; Frederick, Maryland, U.S.
- Party: Democratic
- Spouse(s): Emily Nelson (m. 1835; died 1867) Annie Fisher
- Children: 8
- Parent: Israel D. Maulsby (father)
- Relatives: Richard Dallam (nephew); John I. Yellott (nephew); Emily Nelson Ritchie McLean (granddaughter)
- Education: Union College
- Occupation: Politician; lawyer; judge

William Pinkney Maulsby (July 10, 1815 – October 3, 1894) was an American politician, lawyer and judge from Maryland. He served in the Maryland Senate from 1838 to 1843, and as a justice of the Maryland Court of Appeals from 1870 to 1871.

== Early life ==
William Pinkney Maulsby was born on July 10, 1815, in Bel Air, Maryland, to Jane (née Hall) and Israel D. Maulsby. He attended Bel Air Academy and graduated from Union College in 1832. He studied law under his father and John Nelson of Baltimore. He was admitted to the bar in Carroll County in 1837.

== Career ==
Maulsby practiced law in Frederick and Westminster. He was a Democrat. He served as the first member of the Maryland Senate from Carroll County; serving from 1838 to 1843. He was the first state's attorney from Carroll County; serving from 1844 to 1846.

Maulsby was president of the Chesapeake and Ohio Canal from 1857 to 1859. He was a presidential elector for Stephen A. Douglas in 1860. He served as colonel of the United States Army's 1st Maryland Infantry Regiment, Potomac Home Brigade during the Civil War. He participated in the battles of Charlestown, Harper's Ferry, Martinsburg, Monacy and Gettysburg. He was a delegate from Frederick County for the Maryland Constitution of 1867.

Maulsby was appointed chief judge of the 6th judicial circuit court by Governor Oden Bowie in 1870. He was judge of the Maryland Court of Appeals, then the highest court in the state, from January 20, 1870, to November 7, 1871. He was succeeded by Richard Bowie. In 1873, he defended Joseph W. Davis, who was accused of murdering his wife. After defending Davis and later learning of his guilt after Davis's confession, he sent his legal fees to the wife of the murder victim and stopped practicing criminal law.

== Personal life ==
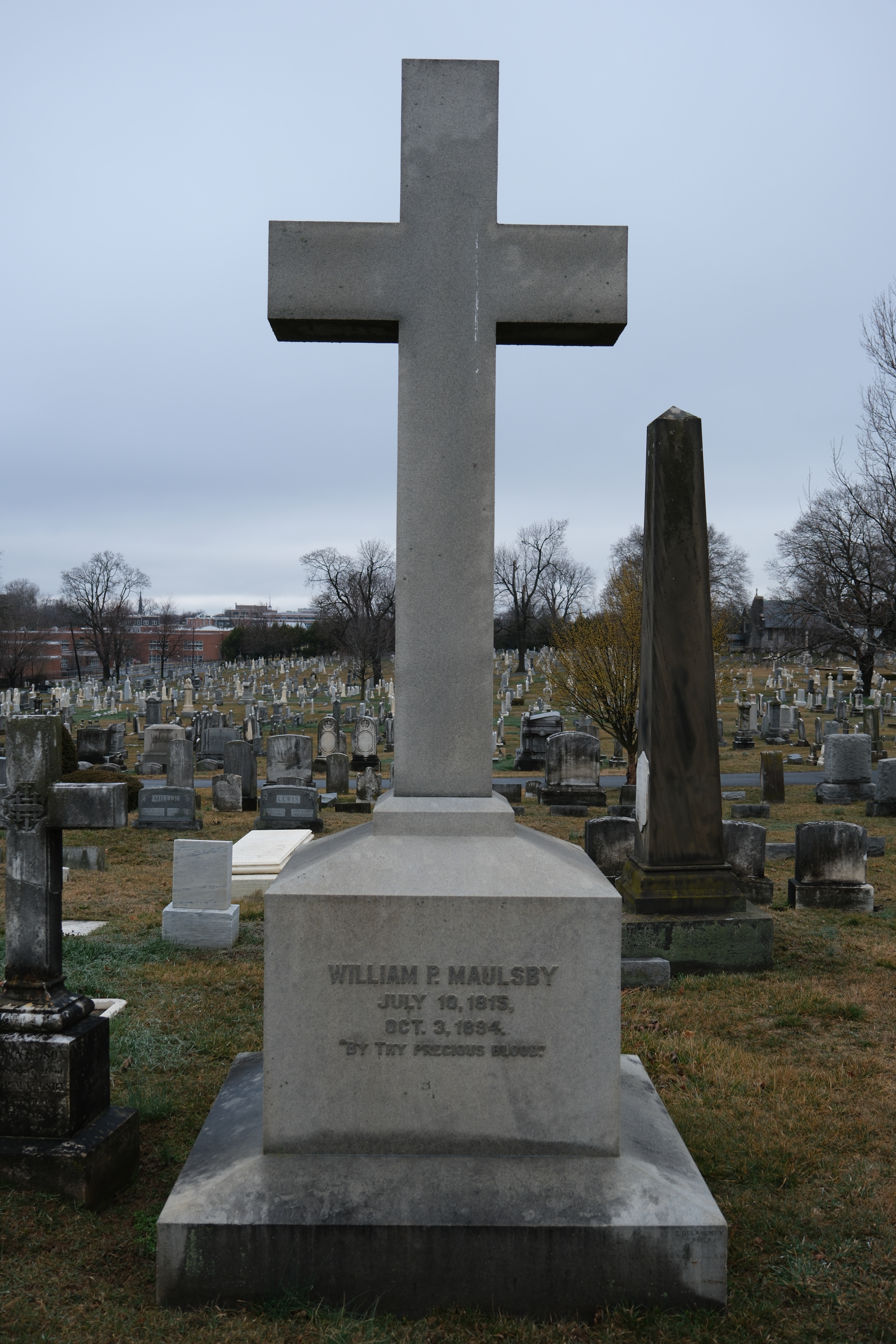
Grave of Maulsby at Mount Olivet Cemetery

Maulsby married Emily Catherine Contee Tylor (or Tyler) Nelson, sister of judge Madison Nelson, of Frederick on November 30, 1835. They had eight children, including William Jr., Emily and Bettie. After his first wife's death, he married Annie (née Monthland) Fisher, widow of John Fisher. His nephews were politicians John I. Yellott and Richard Dallam.

Maulsby lived in Baltimore for several years and lived in Frederick from 1851 to 1872. After his first wife died in 1867, he moved to Westminster shortly after and remained there the rest of his life. He died on October 3, 1894, at his home in Westminster. He was buried at Mount Olivet Cemetery in Frederick.

Political offices
Preceded by Madison Nelson	Judge of the Maryland Court of Appeals; 1870–1871	Succeeded by Richard Bowie
