= Taylor, Maryland =

Unincorporated community in Maryland, U.S.

Coordinates: 39°34′34″N 76°31′02″W

Taylor is an unincorporated community in Harford County, Maryland, United States. Ladew Topiary Gardens and House was listed on the National Register of Historic Places in 1976.
