= John I. Yellott (politician) =

American politician (1840–1919)

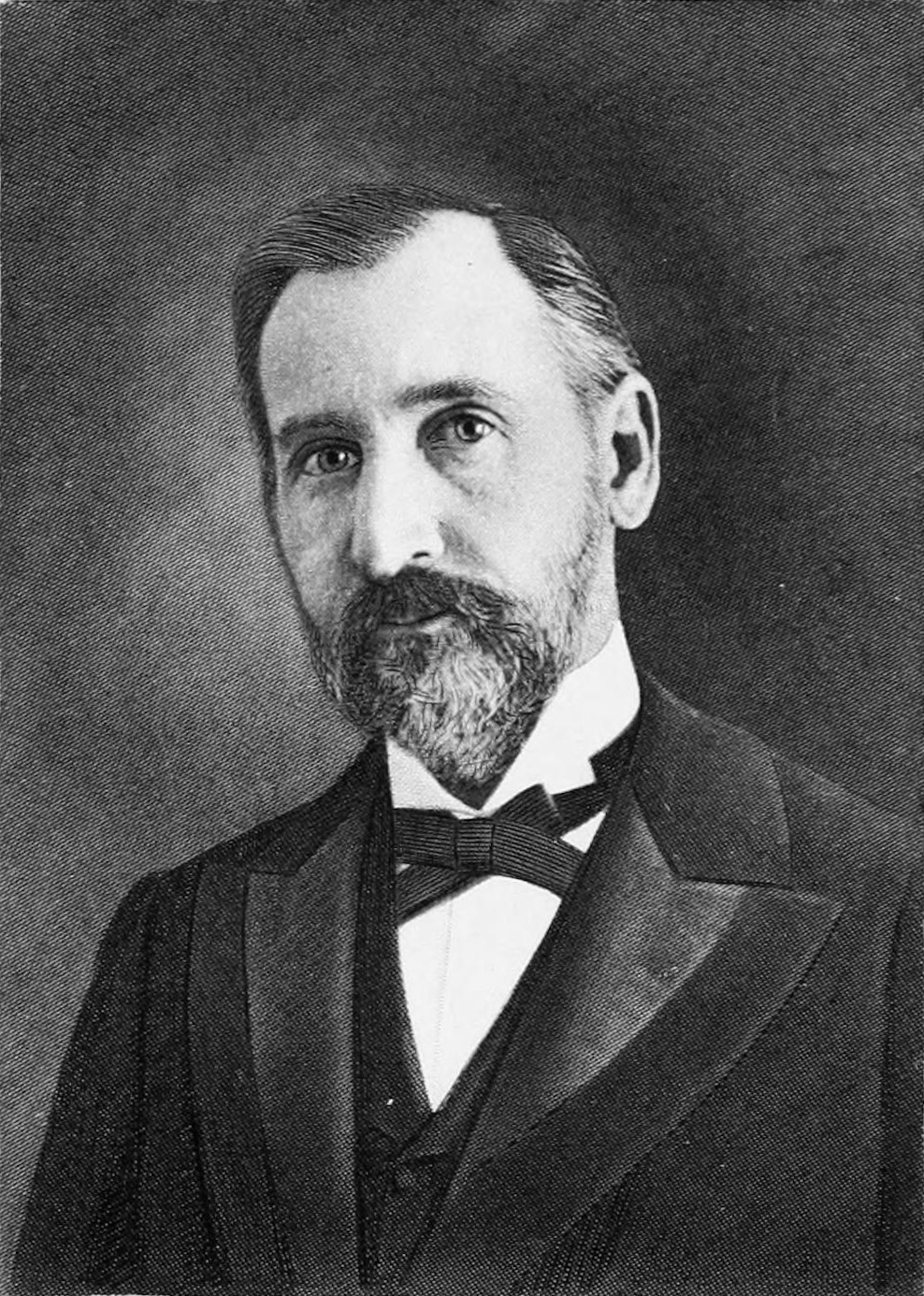
- Portrait of Yellott in 1910 publication

Member of the Maryland House of Delegates from the Baltimore County district
- In office 1878–1878 Serving with Andrew Banks, J. Wolff Burton, Malcolm H. Johnston, Wilson Townsend, George Hawkins Williams

Personal details
- Born: John Israel Yellott; May 11, 1840 Baltimore, Maryland, U.S.
- Died: November 7, 1919 (aged 79) Towson, Maryland, U.S.
- Resting place: Prospect Hill Cemetery; Towson, Maryland, U.S.
- Party: Democratic
- Spouse: Mary V. Frail (m. 1868)
- Children: 6, including Osborne I.
- Relatives: Israel D. Maulsby (grandfather); William P. Maulsby (uncle); Richard Dallam (cousin)
- Occupation: Politician; lawyer; newspaper editor; newspaper publisher
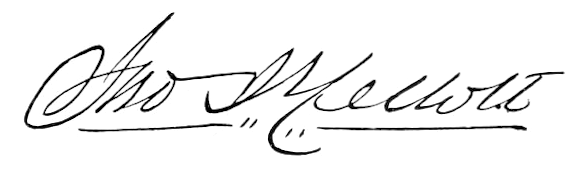
- Signature

John Israel Yellott (May 11, 1840 – November 7, 1919) was an American politician from Maryland. He served as a member of the Maryland House of Delegates, representing Baltimore County in 1878.

== Early life ==
John Israel Yellott was born on May 11, 1840, in Baltimore County to Sarah J. (née Maulsby) and John Yellott. His grandfather was Israel D. Maulsby. His ancestor was Jeremiah Yellott, a designer and builder of clipper ships in Baltimore. His cousin was Richard Dallam. He studied law with his uncle William P. Maulsby of Frederick and finished his studies under John E. Smith of Westminster. He was admitted to the bar before turning 20.

== Career ==
Yellott volunteered for the Union Army at the age of 21. He was promoted from private to captain to major. He was severely wounded at the Battle of Gettysburg and was rendered unfit for active service. He took command of a post in Frederick in 1864. He had this post during the Battle of Monocacy. He retired from service in October 1864. Yellott was nominated for state's attorney of Baltimore County by the Republican Party while in the Army, but he declined.

After he retired from the military, he practiced law in Frederick and Washington, D.C. He also engaged at the military court in Martinsburg, West Virginia, and had offices in Jefferson and Berkeley counties. His practice was associated with Major Andrews. In 1868, he moved back to Maryland and opened an office in Towson. Yellott worked as counsel for the county commissioners of Baltimore County. He was appointed deputy state's attorney in 1870. He worked as counsel for the Baltimore and Ohio Railroad for 25 years.

Yellott was a representative of West Virginia at the Peace Convention in Philadelphia in 1866. Yellott was a Democrat. He served as a member of the Maryland House of Delegates, representing Baltimore County in 1878. He was appointed as state's attorney to replace N. Charles Burke, but he resigned the role after a few months.

Yellott was an associate editor and publisher of a newspaper in eastern West Virginia. In 1870 and 1871, Yellott was the editor of the Baltimore County Democrat. In 1872 and 1873, Yellott joined William S. Keech and worked as an editor and publisher of the Baltimore County Herald.

Yellott was a speaker at the unveiling of the Civil War monument at Druid Hill Park.

== Personal life ==
Yellott married Mary V. Frail, daughter of Edward Frail, of Frederick on June 2, 1868. They had six children, Lydia Trail, Mrs. Frank H. Worthington, Mrs. Carl Gaines, Osborne I. and John I. His son John I. was a reverend. His daughter Lydia married T. Scott Offutt, an attorney in his firm who went on to serve as a judge on the state's high court. His brother George W. Yellott was a county commissioner. Yellott was a member of the Episcopal Church. He was also a Freemason.

Yellott died on November 7, 1919, at his home at 15 West Pennsylvania Avenue in Towson. He was buried at Prospect Hill Cemetery in Towson.
