= James Nelson (politician) =

American politician

Member of the Maryland House of Delegates from the Harford County district
- In office 1833–1836 Serving with Stephen Boyd, Harry D. Gough, Samuel Sutton, Henry H. Johns, James Moores

Personal details
- Occupation: Politician

James Nelson was an American politician from Maryland. He served as a member of the Maryland House of Delegates, representing Harford County from 1833 to 1836.
