= John Forwood =

American politician (1762–1835)

Personal details
- Born: April 1, 1762 near Wilmington, Delaware, British America
- Died: May 22, 1835 (aged 73)
- Resting place: Watter's Meeting House; Harford County, Maryland, U.S.
- Spouse: Hannah Forwood (m. 1785; died 1829)
- Children: 14, including Samuel
- Relatives: John Forwood (cousin)
- Occupation: Politician

John Forwood (April 1, 1762 – May 22, 1835) was an American politician from Maryland. He served in the Maryland House of Delegates.

== Early life ==
John Forwood was born on April 1, 1762, in Brandywine Hundred, near Wilmington, Delaware, to Sarah (née Clark/Clarke) and William Forwood.

== Career ==
Forwood served on the Maryland House of Delegates for about seventeen years. He also served as justice of the peace and as a member of the governor's council.

Forwood was the administrator of several estates. He served as president of the Conowingo Bridge Company and president of a stagecoach company.

== Personal life ==
Forwood married Hannah Forwood, his first cousin, on March 14, 1785. They had fourteen children, including Elizabeth, William, Robert, Jacob, Parker, Samuel, John, Mary, Julia Ann and Amor Tally. His wife died on May 4, 1829. He was an Episcopalian. His son Samuel Forwood was a member of the Alabama House of Representatives. His cousin John Forwood was also a member of the Maryland House of Delegates. He was associated with James Steele.

Forwood owned an estate on Deer Creek called "Spittle Craft".

Forwood died on May 22, 1835. He was buried at Watter's Meeting House in Harford County.
