= Henry Archer =

Henry Archer may refer to:

- Henry Archer (railway enthusiast) (1799–1863), lawyer, inventor and railway enthusiast
- Henry Archer (British Army officer) (1883–1970), see List of British generals and brigadiers
- Henry Archer (Fifth Monarchist) (died c. 1642)
- Henry Archer (MP) (1700–1768), of Hale, Hampshire, British member of parliament.=
- Henry Archer (rugby player) (1932–2019)
- Henry W. Archer (1813–1887), American politician and lawyer
- Henry W. Archer Jr. (c. 1856–1910), American politician and lawyer

== See also ==
- Harry Archer (disambiguation)
- Henry Archer Ekers (1855–1937), Canadian industrialist and politician
