= Noble L. Mitchell =

American politician and lawyer (1854–1932)

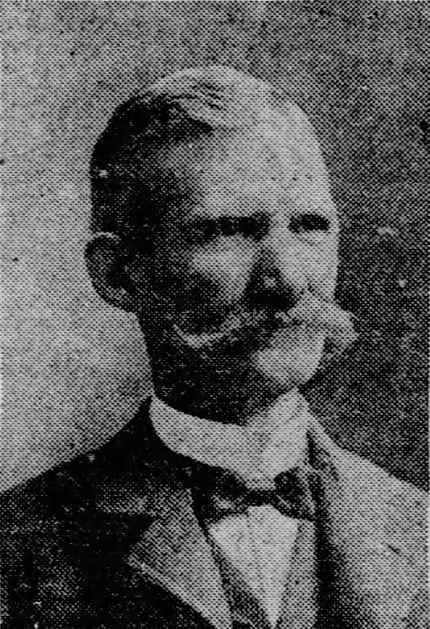
- Mitchell (c. 1901)

Member of the Maryland House of Delegates from the Harford County district
- In office 1918–1918 Serving with Frederick Lee Cobourn and John L. G. Lee

Member of the Maryland House of Delegates from the Harford County district
- In office 1914–1914 Serving with Thomas C. Hopkins and Charles H. McNabb

Speaker of the Maryland House of Delegates
- In office 1902
- Preceded by: Ferdinand Claiborne Latrobe
- Succeeded by: George Y. Everhart

Member of the Maryland House of Delegates from the Harford County district
- In office 1900–1903 Serving with James W. Foster, William B. Hopkins, Howard Proctor, Daniel H. Carroll, George W. McComas

Member of the Maryland House of Delegates from the Harford County district
- In office 1888–1890 Serving with Harry W. Archer Jr., William S. Bowman, Walter W. Preston, William B. Hopkins, George W. Richardson

Personal details
- Born: 1854 Gwynn's Falls, Baltimore, Maryland, U.S.
- Died: January 22, 1932 (aged 77–78) Baltimore, Maryland, U.S.
- Party: Democratic
- Spouse(s): Elva Cannon (m. 1881; died 1908) Estelle Archer (m. 1917)
- Children: 3
- Education: University of Maryland School of Law
- Occupation: Politician; lawyer

Noble L. Mitchell (1854 – January 22, 1932) was an American politician and lawyer from Maryland. He served as a member of the Maryland House of Delegates, representing Harford County, from 1888 to 1890 and from 1900 to 1902.

== Early life ==
Noble L. Mitchell was born in 1854 on Frederick Road near Gwynn's Falls, Baltimore, to Isaac Mitchell. He moved to Harford County with his father at the age of seven. He studied law with Edwin Hanson Webster and graduated from the University of Maryland School of Law in 1880.

== Career ==
Mitchell started a law practice in Bel Air, Maryland. He was elected as secretary, treasurer and examiner of the Board of School Commissioners for Harford County and served until 1887.

Mitchell was a Democrat. He served as a member of the Maryland House of Delegates, representing Harford County, from 1888 to 1890. He withdrew from consideration for the Democratic nomination in the 1891 election. In 1897, Mitchell ran for the Democratic nomination for the Maryland Senate.

Mitchell served again in the Maryland House of Delegates from 1900 to 1902. He served as Speaker of the Maryland House of Delegates in 1902. In 1905, Mitchell ran for the Democratic nomination for the Maryland Senate, but lost to Thomas H. Robinson. He served in the Maryland House of Delegates in 1914 and 1918. He served as county auditor in Harford County.

== Personal life ==
Mitchell married Elva M. Cannon in 1881. His wife died in 1908. They had three daughters, Edna, Anna and Winifred. They lived in Pleasantville, Harford County. Mitchell married Estelle "Stella" Archer, daughter of Stevenson Archer and cousin of Stevenson A. Williams, on December 26, 1917.

Mitchell died on January 22, 1932, at the Church Home and Infirmary in Baltimore.
