= Harry Archer =

Harry Archer may refer to:

- Harry Archer (rugby) (1932–2019), English rugby union and rugby league player
- Harry Archer (composer) (1886–1960), American Broadway musical composer
- Harry M. Archer (1868–1954), professor of medicine, and chief surgeon of the Fire Department of New York City
- Harry W. Archer Jr. (c. 1856–1910), American politician
- Harry Archer, character in Meet Corliss Archer
- Harry Archer, character in Attack of the 50 Ft. Woman (1993 film) and Attack of the 50 Foot Woman

== See also ==
- Henry Archer (disambiguation)
