= Harry Webb Farrington =

American songwriter

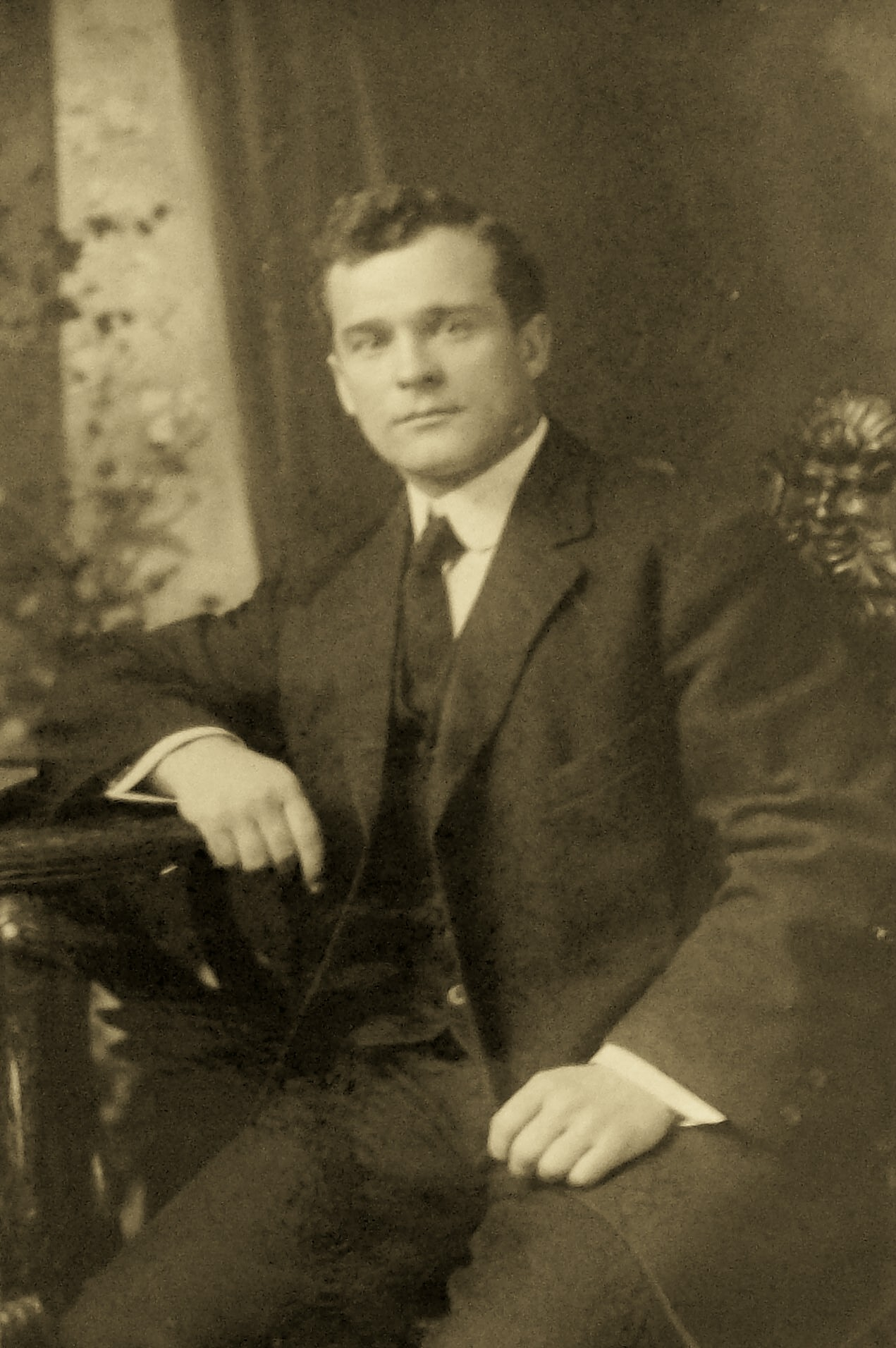
- Harry Webb Farrington, March 1, 1912
- Born: July 14, 1879; Nassau, Bahamas, U.S.
- Died: October 27, 1930 (aged 51); Asbury Park, New Jersey, U.S.
- Occupations: Poet, author, hymn writer

Signature
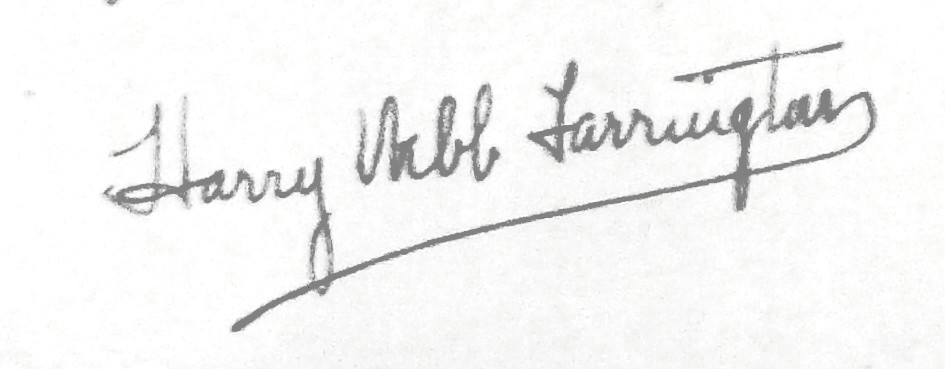

Harry Webb Farrington (1879–1930) was an American author, poet, hymn writer, preacher, soldier, and educator. He was an orphan who lived in Baltimore, Maryland, Bel Air, Maryland, and Darlington, Maryland. He is famous still as being a member of the Darlington United Methodist Church and witnessing the great revivals of the late 1890s. The story of his life comes from one of his books, Kilts to Togs: Orphan Adventures (1930). He is also the author of Cher Ami (1926), Rough and Brown, Walls of America (1925), and Roosevelt the Righteous (1925). He also wrote Poems from France in 1920.

== Life ==
Harry Webb Farrington was born on July 14, 1879, in Nassau, Bahamas. He moved to Baltimore, Maryland, shortly thereafter. According to one of his best sellers, Kilts to Togs, he moved to Bel Air, Maryland, but only lived there for a short time. When he was ten years old, he moved again to a small, quaint little hamlet northeast of Bel Air, to Darlington, Maryland, and lived with the Windolphs. He was raised in the Darlington United Methodist Church and was converted during the revivals of 1895 to 1897 under the direction of Elmer Lodia Dutton.

He worked at a paper mill in Berkley, Maryland. When the paper mill closed, he decided to move to Singerly, Maryland, which is located near Elkton, Maryland. He attended Dickinson Seminary, which is now Lycoming College in Williamsport, Pennsylvania. The college is affiliated with the United Methodist Church. He also graduated from Syracuse University in 1907, and continued his education at Boston University and Harvard University. Farrington served as the athletic director for the French troops during World War I.

He later became an ordained preacher in the Methodist Church, where he served as pastor of the Grace Methodist Church in New York City from 1920 to 1923. He then became the education director in that area for the Methodist Church Welfare League. Due to being paralyzed in an accident, he died on October 27, 1930, in Asbury Park, New Jersey. He was buried in the Pine Lawn Cemetery in Long Island, New York.

== Hymn Writer ==
Harry Webb Farrington is known especially as a hymn writer. Some of the 30 hymns that he wrote include Dear Lord, Who Sought at Dawn of Day (1927), O God, Creator, in Whose Hand (1929), I Know Not How That Bethlehem's Babe, and Strong, Righteous Man of Galilee.
