= Rock Run United Methodist Church =

Church building in Maryland, US

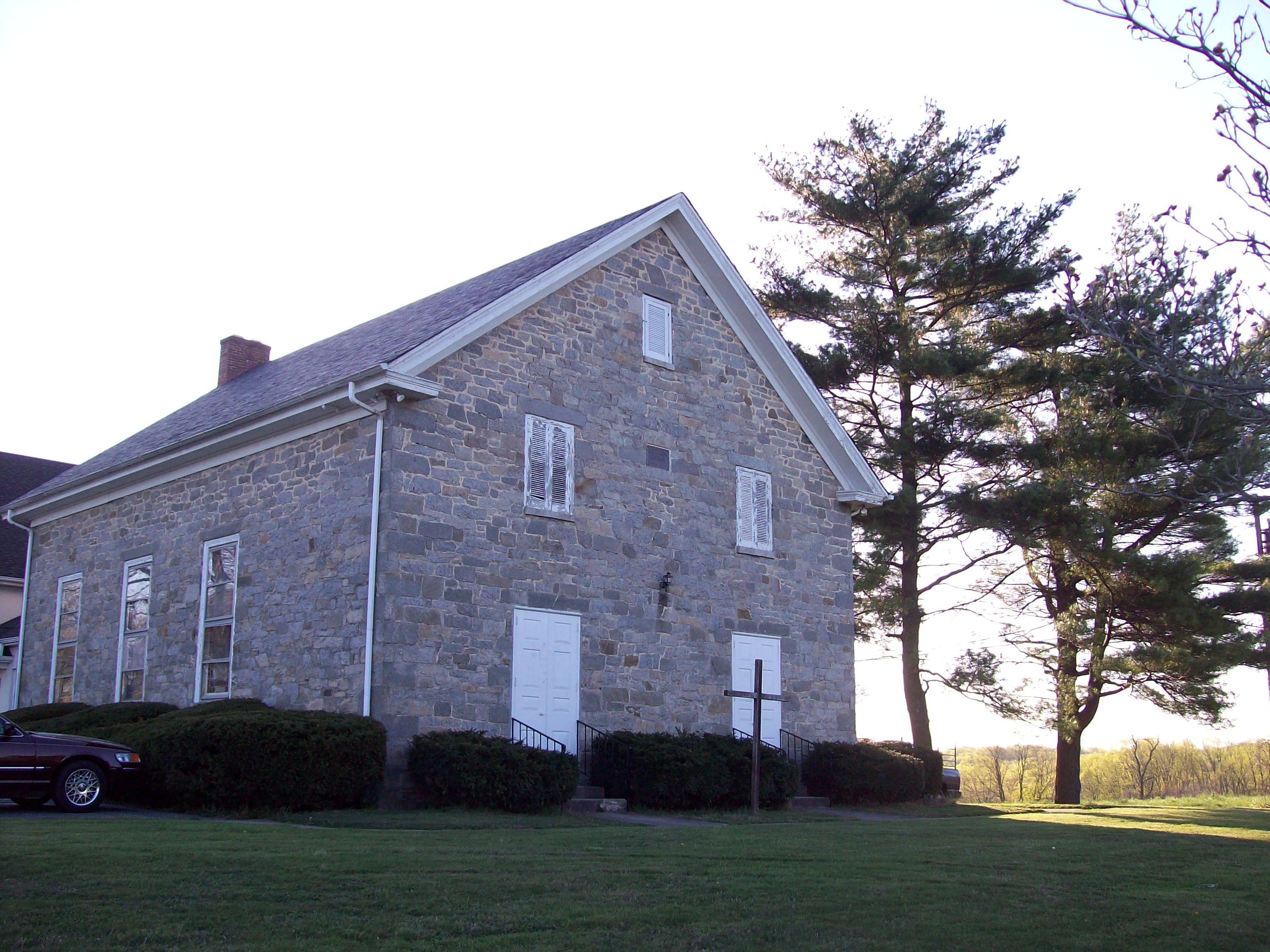
- The church in April 2012
- Interactive map of the Rock Run United Methodist Church area

General information
- Location: Level, Maryland, near Havre de Grace
- Coordinates: 39°36′N 76°12′W
- Completed: 1843

Design and construction
- Architect: Joshua Stephens

Rock Run United Methodist Church is a one-story building, with stone walls and a slate-covered gable roof, located on a 1.24 acre plot of land at the corner of Craig's Corner Road and Rock Run Road near Level, Maryland, USA, and approximately six miles south of Darlington, Maryland. It is a sister church to Darlington United Methodist Church, which forms the Darlington-Rock Run Methodist Charge and is a part of the Baltimore-Washington Conference of the United Methodist Church, headquartered in Columbia, Maryland. It was listed on the Maryland Inventory of Historic Properties in 1977 by the Harford District Commission with code title HA 565. The church also includes a cemetery behind the building along Rock Run Road. An old school house used to reside on the property.

== History ==
The founding of Methodism in Harford County, Maryland, can be traced to Francis Asbury during his travels in 1785, when Ms Rachel Barnes Stephenson offered her home as a place of Methodist meetings. This was located near the Rock Run along the Susquehanna River, now located within the boundaries of the Susquehanna State Park. During one of the meetings, her nineteen-year-old son, William Stephenson, was converted. Meetings continued through the following years until 1811.

In 1795, approximately ten years after William had been converted to the Methodist faith, he was ordained as a local Methodist preacher. His duties included marriage, burial, and attending to the needs of the sick. In 1830, he and his wife traveled throughout Harford County on horseback to those who were almost secluded from other religious societies.

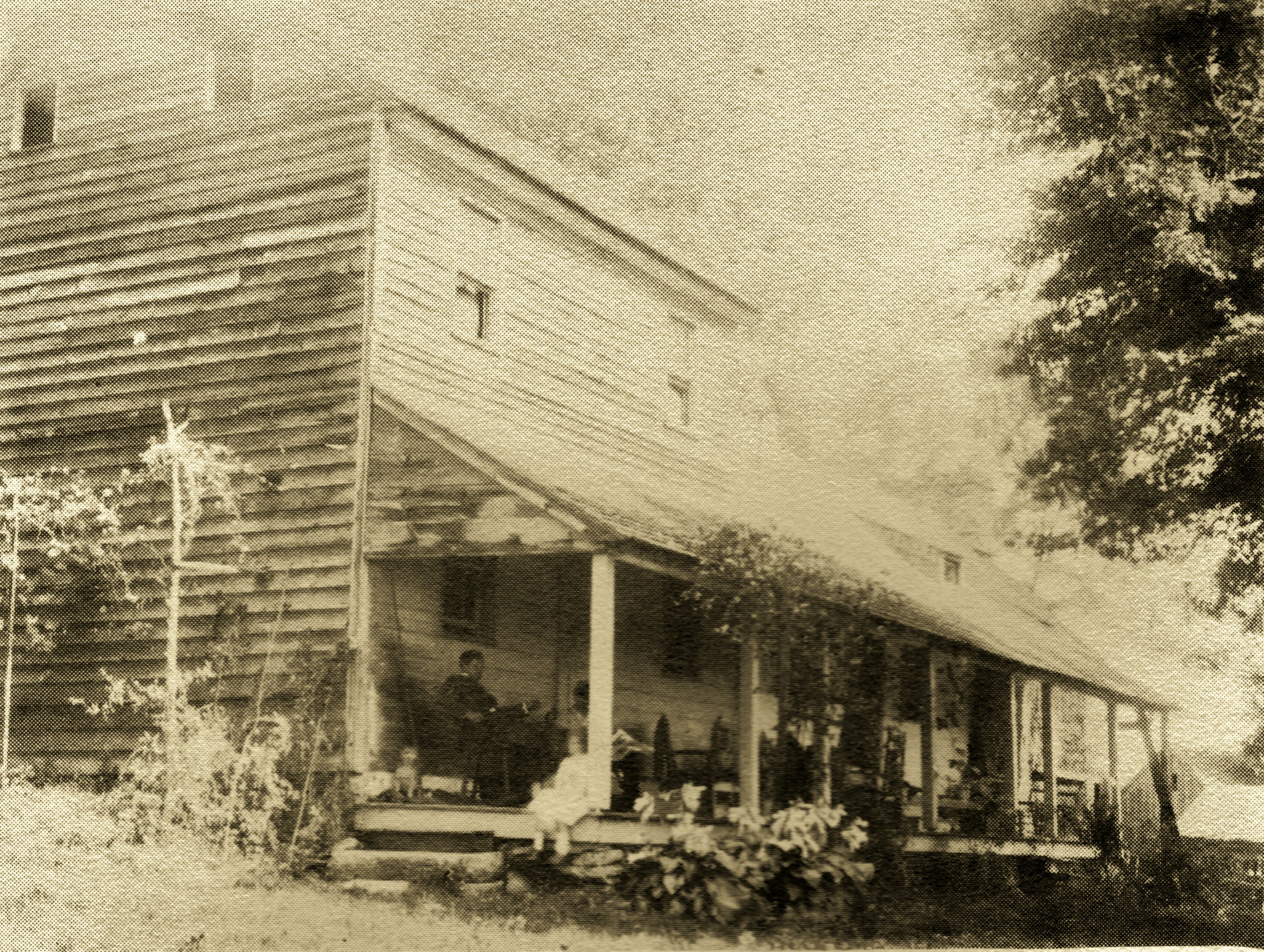
The home of Rev. William Stephenson and the site of Methodist meetings for the Rock Run Society.

In 1811, 125 people were members of the Society. It became apparent that more room was needed and the first church was built on land given by Rev. William Stephenson and Mr. Thomas Nathaniel Smith, on the east side of the old Stafford Road (now in the Susquehanna State Park) near a spring. Local field stone were used in the construction of the walls. The building was completed in 1813 and served as both a church and a school house for nearly 30 years. Stephenson is considered the first minister of the Rock Run Methodist Episcopal Church.

In 1843, with approximately 145 members, the current stone church was constructed and it was at this time that Craig's Corner Road was named Stafford Road. The land for the church was donated by Stephenson's nephew, Joshua W. Stephens, who also built the church building. Due to the ongoing segregation of the area, a balcony was included inside for the use of the local colored people. It was removed in 1869.

Messrs. Oliver Ege and Thomas Swetze were the ministers of the church in the year the Rock Run Church was built. In 1848, the mortgage for the building was paid off, which was written in an old letter by Miss Hannah S. Stephenson to one of the former pastors.

In 1893, a 50th anniversary celebration was held at the church with the then minister, Harry D. Mitchell. In preparation for the festivities, the church was painted and decorated. For the celebrations, former ministers who served Rock Run were in attendance.

Stained glass windows were added to the building in 1908 during Reverend Beall's term as pastor. In 1912, another renovation occurred that included new carpet. The pulpit furniture currently in the chancel was given in the same year and a painting of a scene regarding the three crosses of Calvary was also completed. It no longer exists.

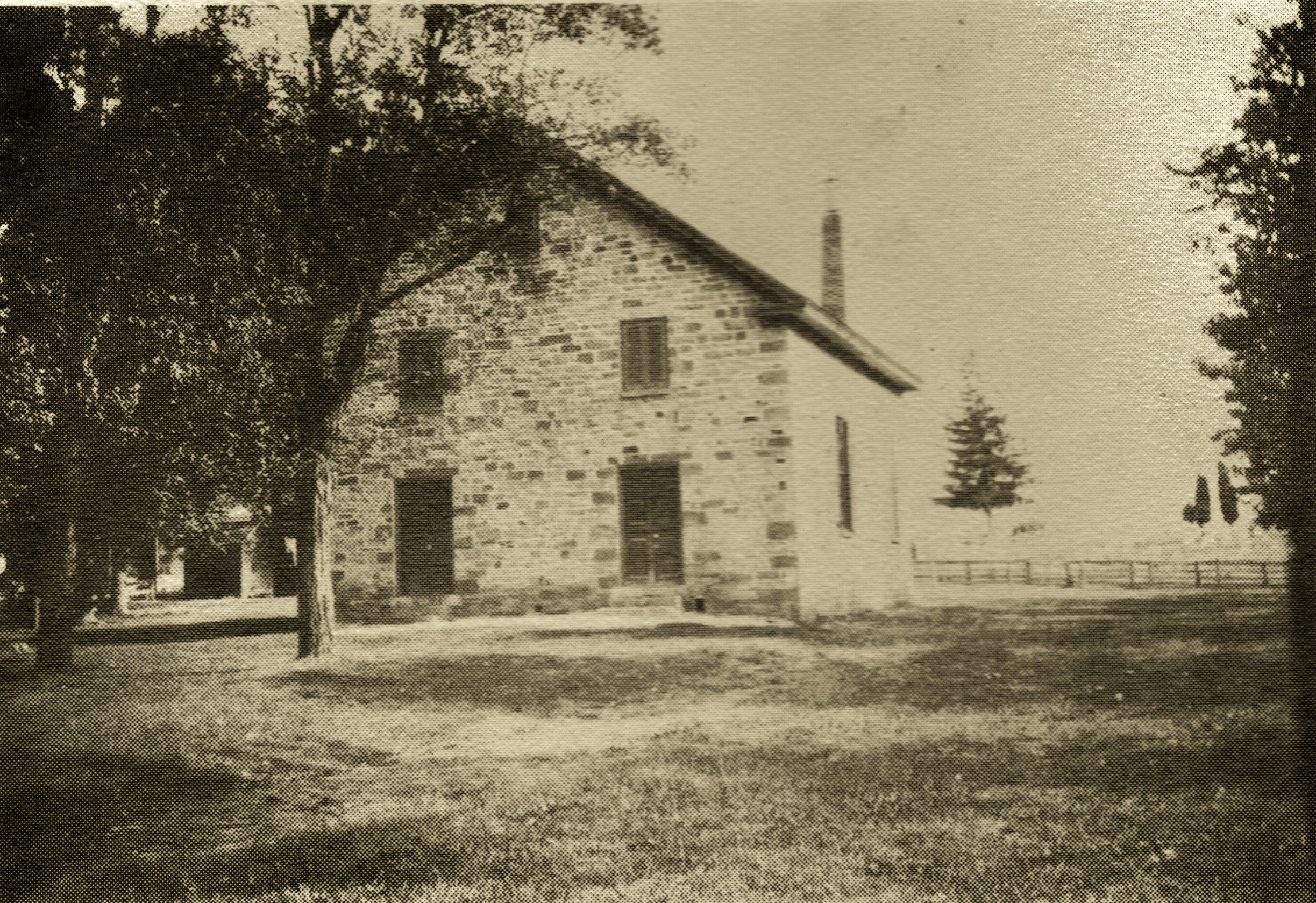
The Rock Run church as it appeared in 1908. The image was taken from the 125th anniversary program.

In 1932, shortly after the merger with the Darlington and Thomas Run Methodist Charge, a sesqui-centennial celebration was held. At this time the Rev. Raymond E. Manley was the pastor. In 1945, Thomas Run Church closed which left Rock Run and Darlington United Methodist Church as the remaining churches in the Methodist Charge. Four years later, in 1949, the church was redecorated, with new carpet included, and the addition of side doors on the northeast wall. Chester Soyer was the pastor at that time.

With much needed improvements to the building along with the growing needs of the Sunday School, the church formed a committee in 1959 to oversee the construction of a new Christian education wing, which was completed in spring 1962, during the time of the Reverend Luther Starnes. In fall 1967, the church sanctuary was again repainted and the lighted cross was included and placed behind the pulpit.

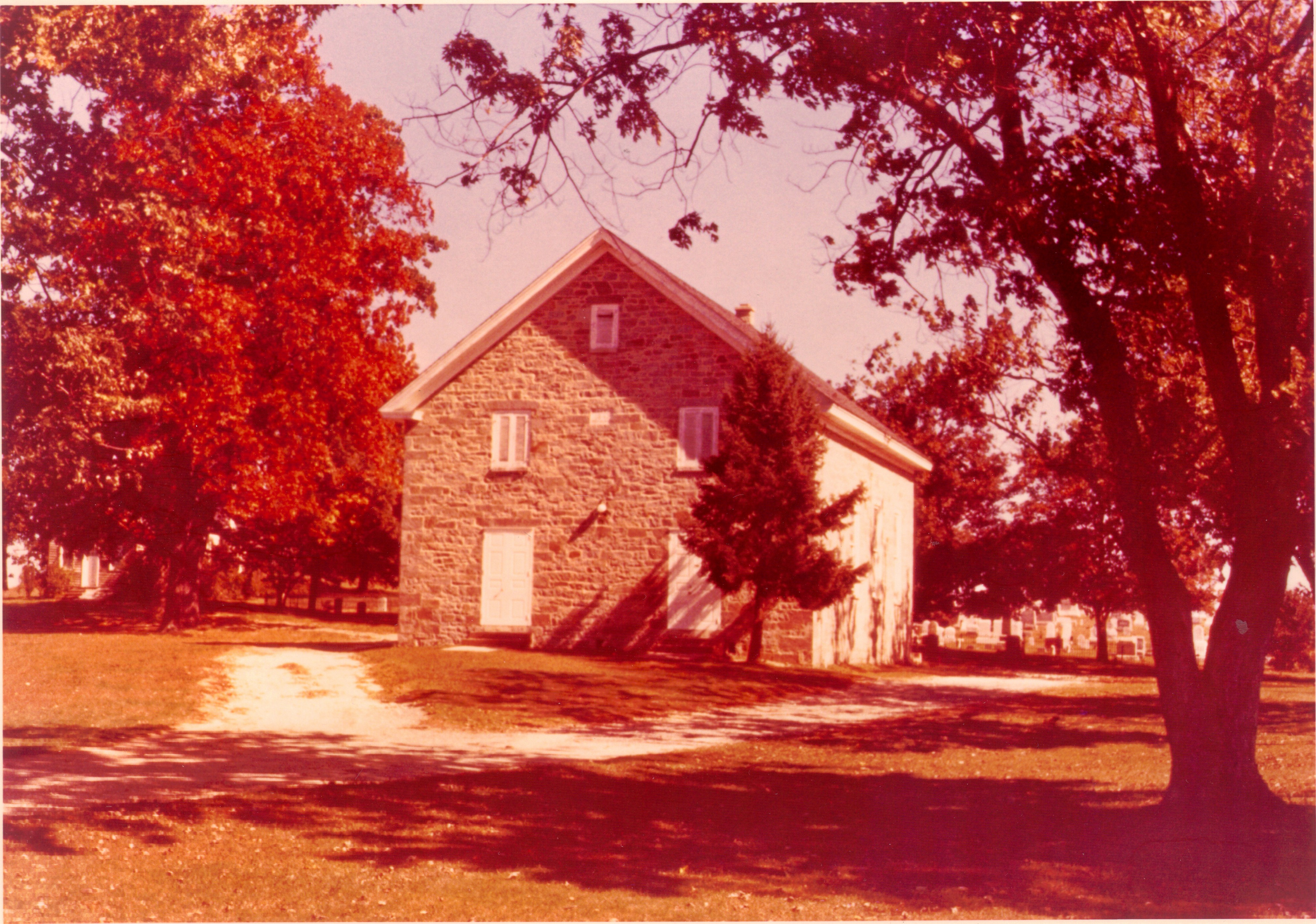
The Church as it appeared in the 1950s. Author unknown.

During the week of March 3–10, 1968, the Church celebrated its 125th anniversary with Bishop John Wesley Lord, Dr. Edward H. Porter (the District Superintendent of the Baltimore Northeast District), and the Reverends Luther W. Starnes (pastor from 1960 to 1962) and Paul Lee Grant (1966 to 1970).

== Rock Run Academy ==
At the time that the first Rock Run Church was constructed in 1813, the local people decided there was a definite need for a school. It was built and used both as a Church and a school until 1821. The locals named the school the Rock Run Academy, or more formally Stephenson's Stone School House. The Reverend William Stephenson was responsible for its beginning and establishment. The first school teacher was Mr. Samuel Guild, who was from New England. He had previously held the position of a tutor for the Jeremiah Harlan family near Darlington. Jeremiah's son, Dr. David Harlan, attended the Academy shortly after 1813. It was reported that Guild held classes through the week from dawn to dusk and the summer vacation was only two weeks. When Guild died in 1821, the school was discontinued in the church building. Dr. David Harlan, who was born in the then village of Stafford in 1809, now in the Susquehanna State Park, after attending Rock Run Academy later became a distinguished doctor who served in the United States Navy. He served during the Mexican and Civil Wars. He retired in 1871 with the rank of Medical Director of the Navy.

== Rock Run School ==
The Stephenson farm was the site of the Stephenson school, which was built in 1825. Reverend William Stephenson's daughter, Elizabeth Stephenson, taught at the school house. She received her education at the nearby Gover Seminary, which was opened for approximately five years at the nearby Gover Mansion. The Stephenson school was built of salvaged boards from the nearby Susquehanna River and when finished was a one-room building with four windows and a loft. The school was open all year, with the exception of winter months. In 1850, the new Rock Run Public School was opened adjoining the church cemetery. It was a one-room, wooden building. It was later demolished.

== Notable burials ==
- William S. Bowman (1822–1901), member of the Maryland House of Delegates
- William B. Hopkins (died 1909), member of the Maryland House of Delegates
- William B. Stephenson (died 1884), member of the Maryland House of Delegates and Maryland Senate
