= Jacob Preston =

Jacob Preston may refer to:

- Jacob A. Preston (1796–1868), US politician
- Jacob Preston (rugby league) (b. 2001), Australian rugby league player
