= Thomas Hitchcock (disambiguation) =

Thomas Hitchcock Sr. was an American horse trainer and polo player.

Thomas Hitchcock may also refer to:

- Thomas Hitchcock (politician) (born 1864), American politician
- Tommy Hitchcock Jr. (1900–1944), American polo player
- Tom Hitchcock (born 1992), English footballer
- Thomas Hitchcock (MP) for Bishop's Castle (UK Parliament constituency)
