= Charles A. Andrew =

American politician (1857–1932)

Member of the Maryland Senate
- In office 1910–1912
- Preceded by: William Benjamin Baker
- Succeeded by: James J. Archer
- Constituency: Harford County

Member of the Maryland House of Delegates
- In office 1904–1906 Serving with Daniel H. Carroll, Thomas Hitchcock, George W. McComas, Harry C. Lawder, Walter R. McComas, Edmund L. Oldfield
- Constituency: Harford County

Personal details
- Born: 1857 Darlington, Maryland, U.S.
- Died: May 6, 1932 (aged 74–75) Berkley, Maryland, U.S.
- Resting place: Darlington Cemetery
- Party: Democratic
- Spouse: Julia Ann Jackson (m. 1883)
- Children: 2
- Occupation: Politician

Charles A. Andrew (1857 – May 6, 1932) was a politician from Maryland. He served in the Maryland House of Delegates from 1904 to 1906 and the Maryland Senate from 1910 to 1912.

== Early life ==
Charles A. Andrew was born in 1857 in Darlington, Maryland, to Mary E. (née Keene) and John W. Andrew. His father was a blacksmith and farmer. Andrew was educated at Darlington Academy.

== Career ==
Around 1881, Andrew started a canning business and worked there for six years. He sold his business to his brother Joseph and moved to Berkley. In 1887, he started a canning factory and farmed in Berkley. In 1893, he purchased the Emlow brothers' warehouse in Berkley. He also owned a warehouse in Conowingo and worked in the hay, grain and feed business. He was president of the Berkley Building and Loan Association for four years.

Andrew was a Democrat. In 1891, he was a candidate for sheriff. In 1897, he was candidate for county clerk. Andrew served in the Maryland House of Delegates, representing Harford County, from 1904 to 1906. He served in the Maryland Senate, representing Harford County, from 1910 to 1912.

In October 1917, Secretary of War Newton D. Baker appointed Andrew to a committee on awards to value the land the War Department purchased for the construction of Aberdeen Proving Ground. Andrew also worked as a coal and lumber dealer.

== Personal life ==
In 1883, Andrew married Julia Ann Jackson of Baltimore County. They had two daughters, Estelle K. and Mary. He was a member of the Methodist Church.

Andrew died on May 6, 1932, at his home in Berkley. He was buried at Darlington Cemetery.
