= John F. Preston =

US Army Inspector General (1872–1960)

John Fisher Preston Jr.
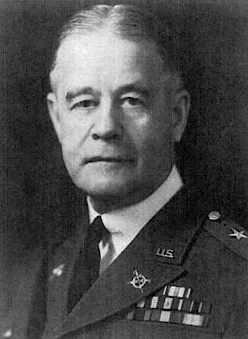
- Born: November 5, 1872
- Died: July 1, 1960 (aged 87)
- Relatives: Jacob A. Preston (grandfather); Walter W. Preston (cousin)
- Military career
- Branch: United States Army
- Service years: 1894–1936
- Rank: Major General
- Wars: Spanish–American War; World War I
- Awards: Silver Star
- Other work: Banker

John Fisher Preston Jr. (November 5, 1872 – July 1, 1960) was an American army officer who rose to the rank of Inspector General of the United States Army. His first conflict was the Spanish–American War serving in the 7th Infantry, and fighting in the Battle of San Juan Hill and Siege of Santiago. For his service in the war, Preston received the Silver Star. He then spent around a decade serving at various forts in the Philippines and across the United States. Preston was involved in the Quartermaster Corps and the Pay Department until the outbreak of World War I, serving a couple of years in France. He attended various Army schools until 1923, and had various leadership positions in the Army over the next fifteen years, culminating in appointment as Inspector General in 1931. After a four-year tenure and brief stationing at Fort Sam Houston, he retired from the army in 1936 and entered the banking industry in San Antonio. He died on July 1, 1960.

== Biography ==
John Fisher Preston Jr., was born on November 5, 1872, in Baltimore, to a prominent lawyer. His grandfather was congressman Jacob A. Preston and his cousin was judge Walter W. Preston. He graduated from the Baltimore City College in 1890, and attended the United States Military Academy from June 17, 1890, until he graduated 21st in the class of 1894 on June 12. He was commissioned in the army as a second lieutenant of infantry in the 16th Infantry. Preston then served on garrison duty at Fort Douglas, Utah, from September 30, 1894, to October 10, 1896. On April 26, 1898, while at Fort Spokane in Washington, he was made a first lieutenant in the 7th Infantry on April 26, 1898. He remained at Spokane until June 1, 1898. Preston was them with the regiment in Tampa, Florida, until June 4, 1898, when he fought in the campaign against Santiago, and the Spanish–American War to August 1898. During that time he fought in the Battle of San Juan Hill on July 1–3, and in the Siege of Santiago until July 17, 1898. For his service in the war, he received the Silver Star "for gallantry in action against Spanish forces at Santiago, Cuba, July 1, 1898."

=== Service in the Philippines ===
After the war his regiment was at Camp Wikoff in New York until he was transferred back to the 16th Infantry on September 16, 1898. From then until January 1890 Preston was on leave before being stationed with his regiment at Fort Crook, Nebraska, to May 24, 1899. His regiment was en route to the Philippines until June 26, 1899, and he was on duty in the field until January 1, 1901. Next Preston was stationed in Aparri, Cagayan Valley as a drill sergeant and battalion adjutant to June 5, 1901. While in Aparri, he was made a captain in the 26th Infantry on February 2, 1901.

On June 30, 1901, Preston joined the regiment at Nueva Caceres and later Daet, Camarines Norte and in the field, to September 12, 1901, when he returned to the United States. Preston was on leave until April 1, 1902, when he returned to the Columbus Barracks to April 15, 1902. On June 10, 1902, he rejoined his regiment in the Philippine Islands. The following day he was made regimental adjutant, serving in that capacity until June 10, 1906. Preston served with the 4th Separate Brigade, in Nueva Caceres, from July 10, 1902, until the discontinuance of the brigade around February 1903.

He returned to the United States with his regiment from July 14, 1903, to Aug. 9, 1903, and was stationed at Fort Sam Houston, in Texas, until May 28, 1907. He was briefly an umpire at West Point in Kentucky, and Fort Riley, in Kansas, from September 26 to October 31, 1903. Preston was at Louisiana Purchase Exposition in St. Louis during July, 1904, and on duty at Fort Sill from August 1 to August 18, 1906. He was adjutant and statistical officer of the Southwestern Division Rifle and Pistol Competitions and in command of Fort Brown, Texas, from August 21, 1906, until September 25, 1906, when the post was abandoned. He returned to the Philippines with his regiment from May 28, 1907, to July 3, 1907, and was stationed at Camp Daraga in Albay to Nov. 21, 1907. Preston was then on duty as an infantry judge in the Department Athletic Competitions, in Manila to December 10, 1907. Preston finished his time in the Philippines at Cuartel de Espana on June 15, 1909, and returned to the United States.

=== In the United States ===
Preston was stationed at Fort Brady, in Michigan, from July 26, 1909, to November 1, 1910, and was made a paymaster on November 2, at which point he moved to Chicago and worked in the Pay Department until March 9, 1911. Preston was then stationed at Fort Sam Houston with the Maneuver Division to November 11. He spent several days in Chicago before returning to Fort Sam Houston as assistant to the chief paymaster. On October 31, 1912, he left the fort and moved to San Antonio, where he led the Quartermaster Corps there from November 1 to February 10, 1913. Preston then served as acting chief quartermaster of the Southern Department, from February 20 to March 3, 1913, and then assistant to the chief quartermaster in the Southern Department, in charge of Finance and Accounting Branches until August 11.

On July 1, 1914, he was assigned to the 4th Infantry. From December 3, 1914, to September 4, 1915, he commanded a company in Galveston, Texas, and was then on border patrol until May 28, 1917. While on the border, he was promoted to major on June 12, 1916, and served as inspector-instructor of state troops at Brownsville, July 19 to August 15, 1916; brigade adjutant of the 1st Provisional Brigade, August 2, 1916, to January 9, 1917; and brigade adjutant of the Brownsville Regular Brigade, January 10 to March 18, 1917. Preston was then in Gettysburg, Pennsylvania, from June 2 to August 18, 1917; at Camp Devens, Massachusetts, from August 21, 1917, to July 5, 1918. While at Devens, he organized and commanded the 303rd Infantry, 76th Division, from September 5, 1917. While in command of the 303rd, he was cited for "thorough administrative knowledge and exceptional tactical abilities".

=== Later military service ===
Preston was deployed to France to fight in World War I on July 27, 1918, and commanded the 152nd Infantry Brigade, 76th Infantry Division, from October 15 to November 10, 1918. He then traveled to Langres, France, and took the Field Officer's Course at Army Schools, from November 13 to 30, 1918. He then commanded the 327th Infantry, 82nd Division from December 1, 1918, to May 26, 1919, when the regiment was demobilized. Preston was en route to the United States from May 7 to 18, 1919. Upon return he was stationed at Camp Upton, New York, to June 14, 1919, then at the Madison Barracks, New York. Preston then commanded the 63rd Infantry and post, July 13 to August 13, 1919, when he began attending the Army School of the Line at Fort Leavenworth, Kansas, on August 15.

From August 5, 1917, to August 31, 1919, Preston was a colonel in the National Army, before returning to the rank of lieutenant-colonel. He graduated from the School of the Line on July 28, 1920, and attended the General Staff School until June 28, 1921. On July 1, 1920, he was again made a colonel. While at the General Staff School, Preston served as an instructor at the Army School of the Line from January 10, 1921, to June 27, 1921. Upon graduation, he was detailed as an instructor at the General Service Schools. He attended the United States Army War College from August 12, 1922, to June 28, 1923. and on June 29 was detailed to the general staff.

Preston was stationed at Fort Sam Houston, Texas, as G-3 and then Chief of Staff, 8th Corps Area, from September 11, 1923, to October 1, 1926; when he was assigned to 1st Infantry. He then moved to Fort Benning, Georgia, and attended a refresher course before returning to Fort Sam Houston, and taking command of the 1st Infantry, from Dec. 30, 1926, to June 10, 1927. Preston then commanded the 4th Brigade from June 10, 1927, to June 25, 1927, when he was stationed at Fort D. A. Russell, Wyoming. He remained at the fort from June 28, 1927, to November 22, 1928; when he moved to Washington, D.C., and was made Executive, Office of The Inspector-General, on Nov. 24, 1928.

He served in that capacity until November 30, 1931, and was made Inspector General of the United States Army and promoted to major general on December 1. He served as Inspector General until Nov. 30, 1935. He then attempted to be given command of the Soldiers' Home. When the attempt failed, Preston reverted to the permanent rank of colonel and was stationed at Fort Sam Houston, Texas, as the Eighth Corps Area civilian components officer from Dec. 1, 1935, to Nov. 30, 1936. He retired from the Army on November 30, 1936.

=== Later life and death ===
After retiring from the Army, Preston moved to San Antonio and entered the banking business, rising to be director of the National Bank of Fort Sam Houston Texas. He died on July 1, 1960.

== Bibliography ==
- Cullum, George W. (1901). Biographical register of the officers and graduates of the U.S. Military Academy at West Point, N.Y., from its establishment, in 1802 : [Supplement, volume IV 1890–1900]. Cambridge: Riverside Press.
- Cullum, George W. (1910). Biographical register of the officers and graduates of the U.S. Military Academy at West Point, N.Y., from its establishment, in 1802 : [Supplement, volume V 1900–1910]. Saginaw, Michigan: Seeman & Peters, Printers.
- Cullum, George W. (1920). Biographical Register of the Officers and Graduates of the US Military Academy at West Point New York since its Establishment in 1802: Supplement Volume VI 1910–1920 A. Saginaw, Michigan: Seeman & Peters, Printers.
- Cullum, George W. (1930). Biographical Register of the Officers and Graduates of the US Military Academy at West Point New York since its Establishment in 1802: Supplement Volume VII 1920–1930. Chicago, Illinois: R. R. Donnelly and Sons, The Lakeside Press.
- Cullum, George W. (1940). Biographical Register of the Officers and Graduates of the US Military Academy at West Point New York Since Its Establishment in 1802: Supplement Volume VIII 1930–1940. Chicago: R. R. Donnelly and Sons, The Lakeside Press.
- Whitehorne, Joseph W. A. (1998). The Inspectors General of the United States Army, 1903–1939. Government Printing Office.
- "Promoted to High Rank". The Aegis. 1931-07-17. p. 1 – via Newspapers.com.
