= James J. Archer (Maryland politician) =

American politician and lawyer (1860–1921)

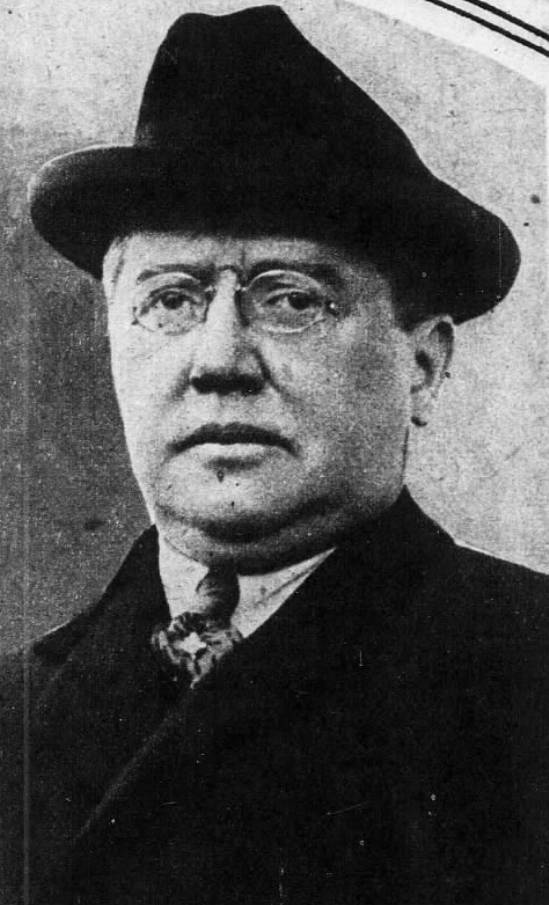
- Archer in 1917

Member of Maryland Senate
- In office 1914–1917
- Preceded by: Charles W. Michael
- Succeeded by: J. Royston Stifler
- Constituency: Harford County

Personal details
- Born: July 12, 1860 Bel Air, Maryland, U.S.
- Died: May 24, 1921 (aged 60) Bel Air, Maryland, U.S.
- Resting place: Green Mount Cemetery; Baltimore, Maryland, U.S.
- Party: Democratic
- Relations: Henry W. Archer Jr. (brother); James J. Archer (uncle); John Archer (great-grandfather)
- Parent: Henry W. Archer (father)
- Education: Princeton University; University of Maryland School of Law
- Occupation: Politician; lawyer

James J. Archer (July 12, 1860 – May 24, 1921) was an American politician and lawyer. He served in the Maryland Senate from 1914 to 1917.

== Early life ==
James J. Archer was born on July 12, 1860, at Shamrock, Bel Air, Maryland, to Henry W. Archer. His father was a state delegate and lawyer. His brother was Henry W. Archer Jr., who also served as state delegate. His great-grandfather was John Archer. His uncles were James J. Archer and Robert Archer, who both served with the Confederate States Army. Archer studied at Bel Air Academy. Archer studied at Princeton University and graduated from University of Maryland School of Law.

== Career ==
Archer practiced law for thirty years in Harford, Cecil and Baltimore counties.

Archer was a Democrat. Archer was elected in 1913, defeating Walter W. Preston in the primary and C. W. Famous in the general election for Maryland Senate. He served in the senate from 1914 to 1917.

== Personal life ==
Archer did not marry.

Archer died on May 24, 1921, at his home in Shamrock, Bel Air, Maryland. He was buried at the family lot in Green Mount Cemetery in Baltimore.
