= Darlington United Methodist Church =

Historic church in Maryland, United States

- U.S. Historic district – Contributing property
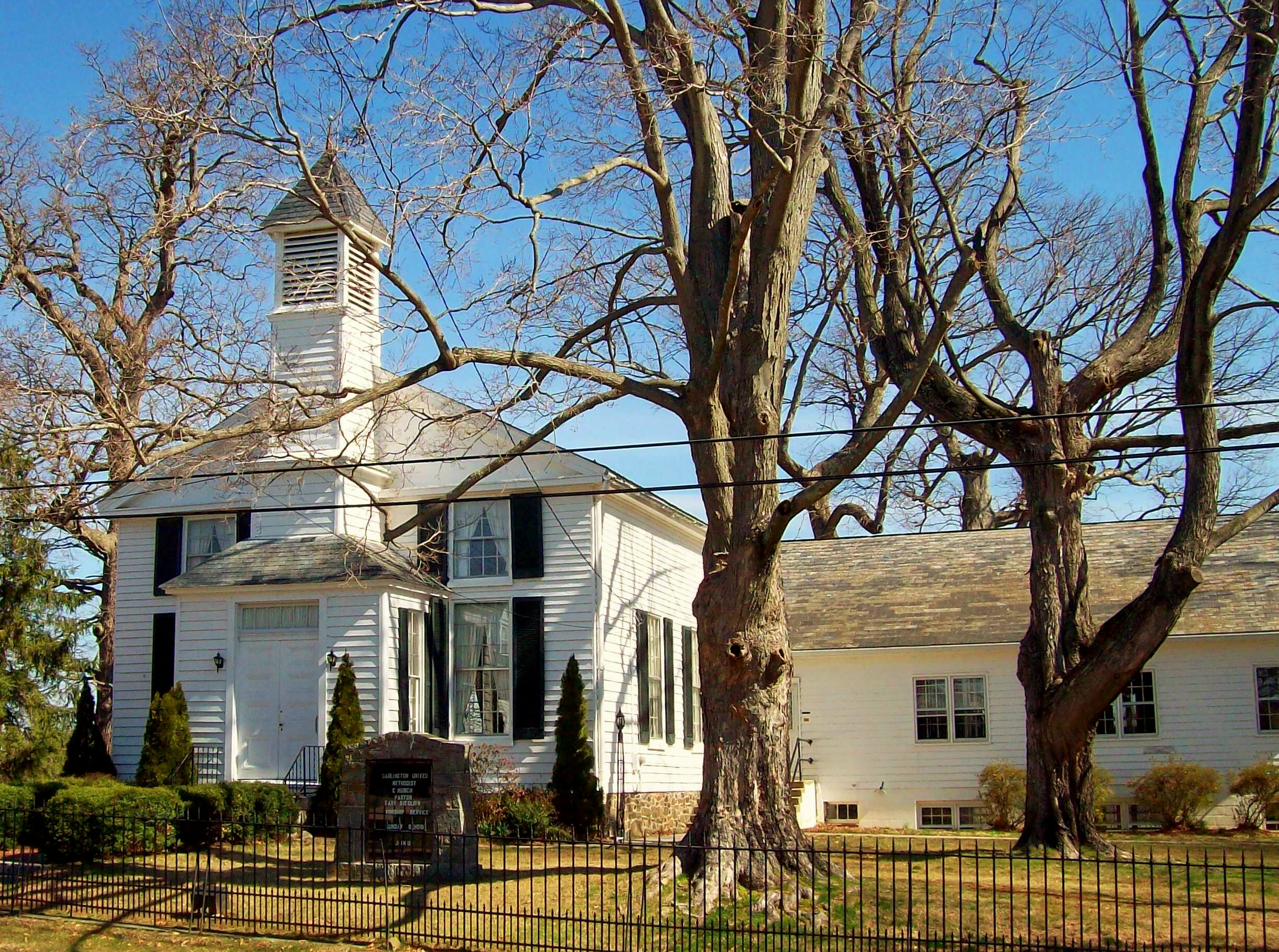
- Darlington United Methodist Church in 2011

- Location within Maryland Location within the United States
- Location: 2117 Shuresville Rd., Darlington, Maryland
- Coordinates: 39°38′25″N 76°12′3″W
- Built: 1852
- Architectural style: classic
- Part of: Darlington Historic District (ID87001571)

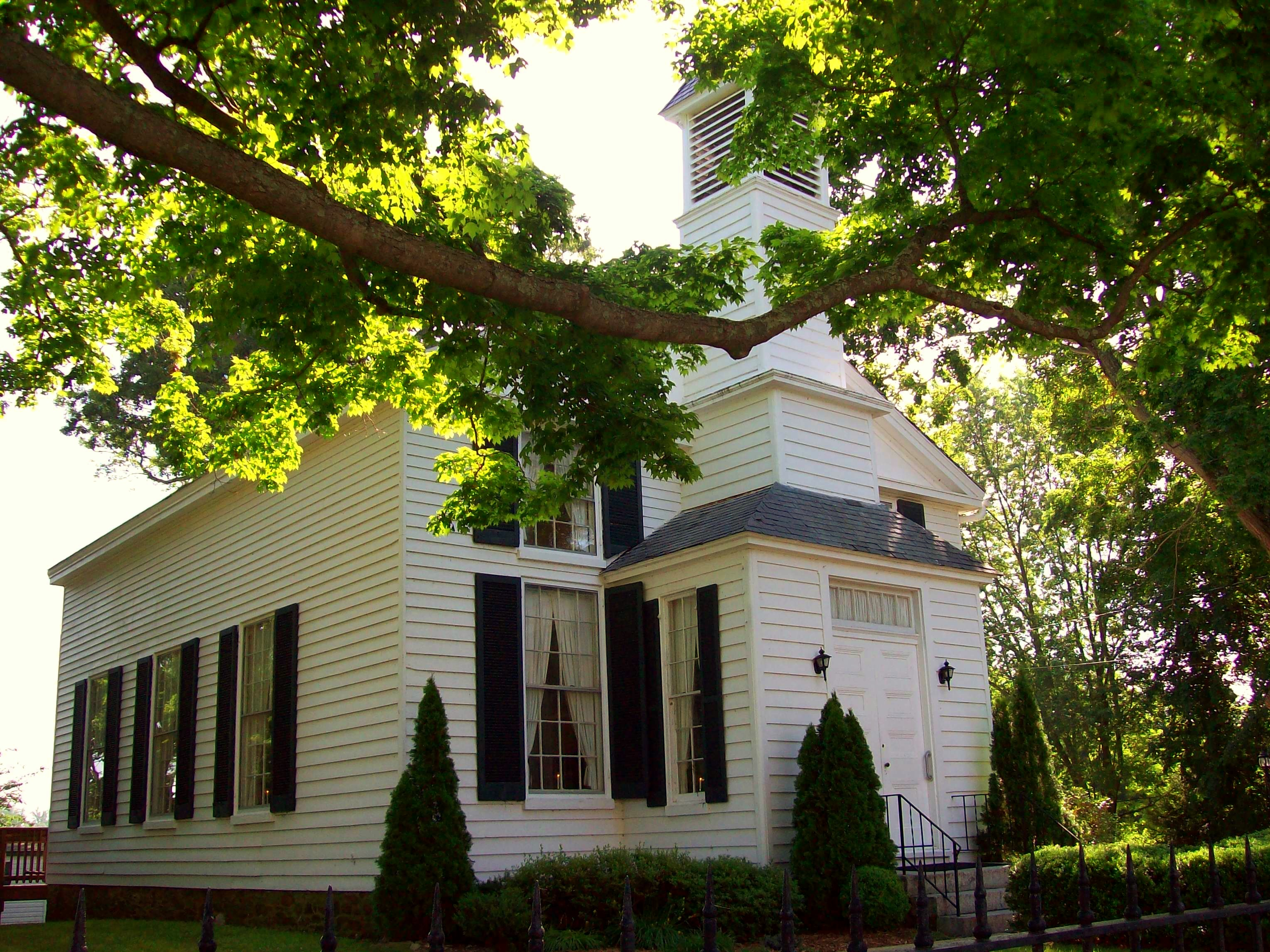
The outside of the church in June 2010

Darlington United Methodist Church is located in Darlington, Maryland. It is a pre Civil War structure, built in 1852, with white siding, large windows, and many historically original architecture. It is a church within the Baltimore Washington Conference of the United Methodist Church. It is also one of two churches part of the Darlington Methodist Charge, the other being Dublin United Methodist Church in Street, Maryland. Prior to July 2014, the church shared pastors with Rock Run United Methodist Church, located in nearby Level, Maryland. There was a third sister church, Thomas Run Church which closed its doors in 1945.

== History ==
In 1832 a log structure was built on the site. It was later replaced in 1852 by the existing frame structure, with a belfry and vestibule in 1892.
