= Edmund L. Oldfield =

American politician and farmer (1863–1938)

- In office 1906–1907 Serving with Charles A. Andrew, Harry C. Lawder, Walter R. McComas
- Preceded by: Thomas Hitchcock
- Constituency: Harford County

Personal details
- Born: November 7, 1863 Fountain Green, Harford County, Maryland, U.S.
- Died: March 19, 1938 (aged 74) Stoneleigh, Towson, Maryland, U.S.
- Resting place: Mount Zion Cemetery; Fountain Green, Harford County, Maryland, U.S.
- Party: Democratic
- Spouse: Alice Wilkinson
- Children: 4
- Education: Eaton & Burnett's Business College
- Occupation: Politician; farmer

Edmund L. Oldfield (November 7, 1863 – March 19, 1938) was an American politician and farmer from Maryland. He served as a member of the Maryland House of Delegates, representing Harford County, from 1906 to 1907.

== Early life ==
Edmund L. Oldfield was born on November 7, 1863, in Fountain Green, Harford County, Maryland, to Hannah (née Carter) and William Oldfield. His father was a farmer and pump maker. Oldfield graduated from Eaton & Burnett's Business College in 1884.

== Career ==
Oldfield was a farmer, dairy farmer and raised livestock. He had a farm at The Rocks.

Oldfield was a Democrat. Oldfield defeated Thomas Hitchcock in the 1905 election for the Maryland House of Delegates. Oldfield served as a member of the House of Delegates, representing Harford County, from 1906 to 1907. He also served as county chairman of the Democratic State Central Committee.

== Personal life ==
Oldfield married Alice Wilkinson. They had two sons and two daughters, William L., Harry W., Edna O. and Mrs. Robert D. Massica.

Oldfield died on March 19, 1938, at his home at 7114 Rich Hill Road at Stoneleigh, Towson, Maryland. He was buried at Mount Zion Cemetery in Fountain Green.
