= William B. Hopkins (Maryland politician) =

American politician (1842–1909)

Member of the Maryland House of Delegates from the Harford County district
- In office 1900–1901 Serving with James W. Foster, Noble L. Mitchell, Howard Proctor
- In office 1890–1892
- Preceded by: Noble L. Mitchell, Walter W. Preston, George W. Richardson

Personal details
- Born: August 2, 1842 Harford County, Maryland, U.S.
- Died: March 25, 1909 (aged 66) near Havre de Grace, Maryland, U.S.
- Resting place: Rock Run Cemetery
- Party: Democratic
- Spouse: Elizabeth Stephenson
- Children: 4
- Occupation: Politician; farmer

William B. Hopkins (August 2, 1842 – March 25, 1909) was an American politician from Maryland. He served as a member of the Maryland House of Delegates, representing Harford County from 1890 to 1892 and from 1900 to 1901.

== Early life ==
William B. Hopkins was born on August 2, 1842, at the family homestead near Trappe Church in Harford County, Maryland, to Amanda (née Dallam) and J. Lee Hopkins. His second cousin once removed was Richard Dallam. At the age of 17, his father died and he took over the farm.

== Career ==
Hopkins was a Democrat. He served as a member of the Maryland House of Delegates, representing Harford County from 1890 to 1892 and from 1900 to 1901.

Hopkins was a farmer.

== Personal life ==
At the age of 29, Hopkins married Elizabeth Stephenson, adopted daughter of William B. Stephenson. They had four children, J. Lee, William Stephenson, Annie W. and Francina "Fannie" H. Silver. After William B. Stephenson died, his wife was bequeathed his farm near Lapidum and they lived there. He was a member of Rock Run United Methodist Church.

Hopkins died on March 25, 1909, in Garland, near Havre de Grace. He was buried at Rock Run Cemetery.
