= Howard Proctor =

American politician and manufacturer (died 1938)

Member of the Maryland House of Delegates from the Harford County district
- In office 1900–1902 Serving with James W. Foster, William B. Hopkins, Noble L. Mitchell, Daniel H. Carroll, George W. McComas

Personal details
- Born: near Prospect, Harford County, Maryland, U.S.
- Died: July 30, 1938
- Resting place: Slate Ridge Cemetery; Cardiff, Maryland, U.S.
- Party: Democratic
- Spouse: Mary Webb
- Children: 4
- Occupation: Politician; manufacturer; canner

Howard Proctor (died July 30, 1938) was an American politician and manufacturer from Maryland. He served as a member of the Maryland House of Delegates, representing Harford County, from 1900 to 1902.

== Early life ==
Howard Proctor was born near Prospect, Harford County, Maryland, to Edward Proctor. His family owned a slate quarry on Slate Ridge in Harford County. Proctor attended public schools in Harford County.

== Career ==
Proctor worked as superintendent and general manager of the Proctor Bros. slate quarries. He also worked as a canner.

Proctor was a Democrat. He served as a member of the Maryland House of Delegates, representing Harford County, from 1900 to 1902.

Proctor was a trustee of the Slate Ridge Presbyterian Church. He was a charter member of the Mason and Dixon Club.

== Personal life ==
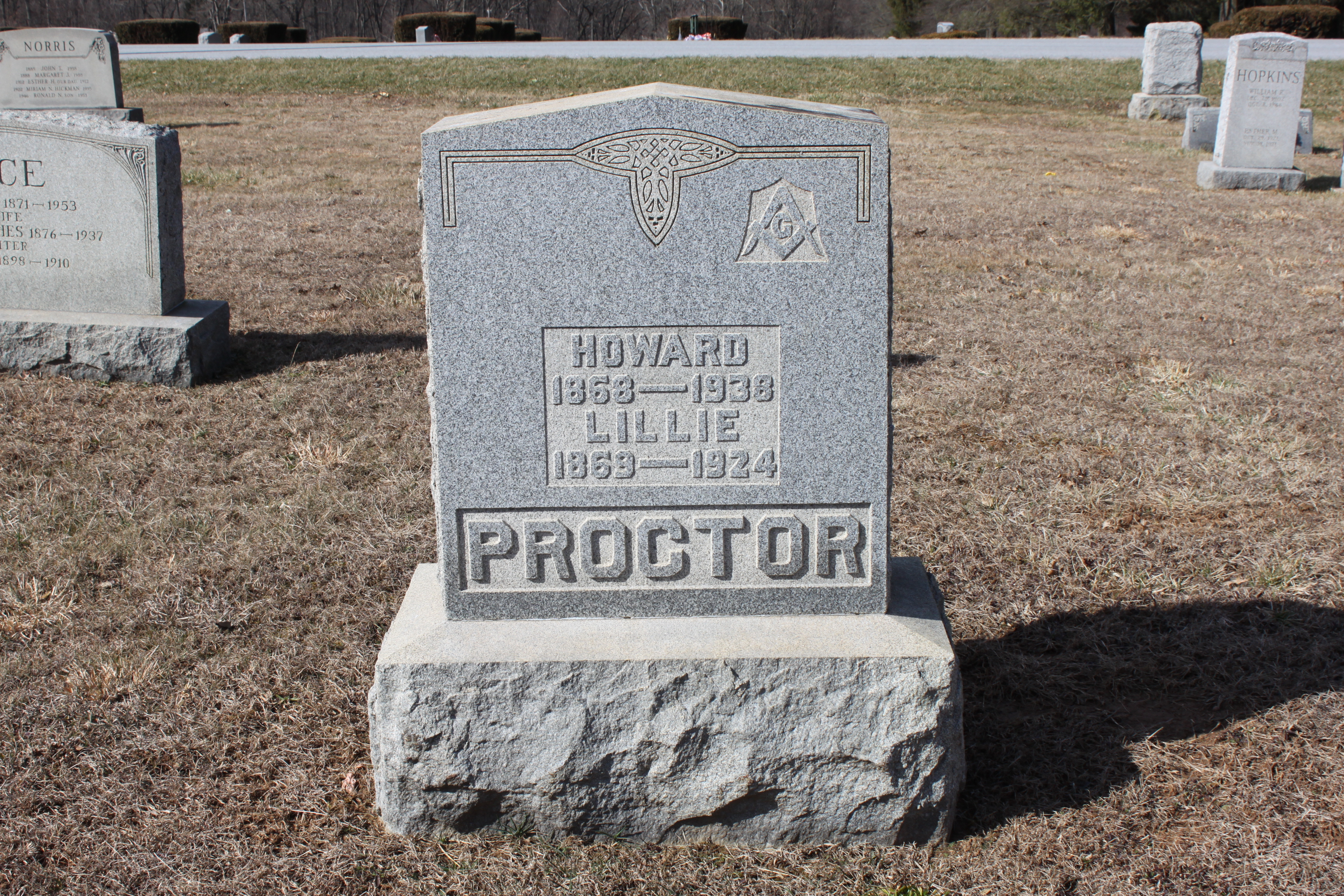
Grave of Proctor at Slate Ridge Cemetery

Proctor married Mary Webb. They had two daughters and two sons.

Proctor died on July 30, 1938, at his home. He was buried at Slate Ridge Cemetery in Cardiff, Maryland.
