= J. Royston Stifler =

American politician and lawyer (died 1921)

Member of the Maryland Senate
- In office 1918–1920
- Preceded by: James J. Archer
- Succeeded by: Millard E. Tydings
- Constituency: Harford County

Personal details
- Born: Harford County, Maryland, U.S.
- Died: February 15, 1921 (aged 59)
- Resting place: Norrisville Methodist Protestant Cemetery; Norrisville, Maryland, U.S.
- Spouse: Welgetta Brownel (m. 1890)
- Children: 1
- Education: Dickinson College
- Occupation: Politician; lawyer

J. Royston Stifler (died February 15, 1921) was an American politician and lawyer from Maryland. He served in the Maryland Senate from 1918 to 1920.

== Early life ==
J. Royston Stifler was born in Harford County, Maryland, to Margaret McC. and Curtis H. Stifler. He studied at county schools and graduated from Dickinson College in 1886. He was admitted to the bar in 1888.

== Career ==
After getting admitted to the bar, Stifler practiced law. Stifler served as state's attorney of Harford County, from 1904 to 1916. In 1917, Stifler served as a presidential elector.

Stifler was a Democrat. Stifler served in the Maryland Senate, representing Harford County, from 1918 to 1920.

== Personal life ==
Stifler married Mrs. Welgetta Brownel in 1890. They had one son, F. Royston. Stifler lived in Bel Air, Maryland.

Stifler died on February 15, 1921, at the age of 59, at Mercy Hospital. He was buried at Norrisville Methodist Protestant Cemetery in Norrisville, Maryland.
