= James W. Foster =

American politician (died 1932)

Member of the Maryland House of Delegates from the Harford County district
- In office 1900–1901 Serving with William B. Hopkins, Noble L. Mitchell, Howard Proctor

Personal details
- Born: James William Foster Havre de Grace, Maryland, U.S.
- Died: November 17, 1932 (aged 90) Havre de Grace, Maryland, U.S.
- Resting place: Angel Hill Cemetery; Havre de Grace, Maryland, U.S.
- Party: Democratic
- Occupation: Politician

James William Foster (died November 17, 1932) was an American politician from Maryland. He served as a member of the Maryland House of Delegates, representing Harford County from 1900 to 1901.

== Early life ==
James William Foster was born in Havre de Grace, Maryland.

== Career ==
Foster worked as the manager of John H. DuBois lumber business.

Foster was a Democrat. He served as a member of the Maryland House of Delegates, representing Harford County from 1900 to 1901. Foster withdrew his nomination for re-election in August 1901.

Foster was a member of the building committee for the Methodist Episcopal Church of Havre de Grace completed in 1902.

== Personal life ==
Foster was a member of the Methodist Episcopal Church.

Foster died on November 17, 1932, at the age of 90, in Havre de Grace. He was interred at Angel Hill Cemetery.
