= George W. McComas =

American politician (1841–1928)

Member of the Maryland House of Delegates from the Harford County district
- In office 1902–1905 Serving with Daniel H. Carroll, Noble L. Mitchell, Howard Proctor, Charles A. Andrew, Thomas Hitchcock

Personal details
- Born: George William McComas; April 13, 1841 Harford County, Maryland, U.S.
- Died: October 4, 1928 (aged 87) Singer, Harford County, Maryland, U.S.
- Resting place: Union Chapel Cemetery; Overlea, Maryland, U.S.
- Party: Democratic
- Spouse(s): Virginia G. Norris (m. 1874) Nellie Norris Kindley (m. 1907)
- Children: 4
- Occupation: Politician; farmer; canner

George William McComas (April 13, 1841 – October 4, 1928) was an American politician from Maryland. He served as a member of the Maryland House of Delegates, representing Harford County, from 1902 to 1905.

== Early life ==
George William McComas was born on April 13, 1841, in Harford County, Maryland, to Keziah (née Cunningham) and Henry G. McComas. His grandfather William McComas and great-uncle Henry C. McComas fought and died in the defense of Baltimore in 1812. He attended public schools in Baltimore until the age of 14 and then worked on the family farm. He was educated at Newton Academy in Baltimore.

== Career ==
McComas was a farmer and canner of farm products, particularly corn and tomatoes.

McComas was a Democrat. He served as a member of the Maryland House of Delegates, representing Harford County, from 1902 to 1905.

== Personal life ==
On December 3, 1874, McComas married Virginia G. Norris, daughter of Cardiff Norris. They had four children, H. G., C. N., George W. and Nona Mary. He was a member of the Methodist Church. He married Nellie Norris Kindley of Monrovia, Maryland, on November 23, 1907. They lived in Singer, Maryland.

McComas died on October 4, 1928, at his home in Singer. He was buried at Union Chapel Cemetery in Overlea.
