= Daniel H. Carroll =

American politician (1878–1966)

Member of the Maryland House of Delegates from the Harford County district
- In office 1902–1905 Serving with George W. McComas, Noble L. Mitchell, Howard Proctor, Charles A. Andrew, Thomas Hitchcock

Personal details
- Born: July 23, 1878 near Bel Air, Maryland, U.S.
- Died: May 6, 1966 (aged 87)
- Party: Democratic
- Spouse(s): Elizabeth Dowling (m. 1900; died 1914) Grace Gibson (m. 1915)
- Children: 5
- Education: Eaton & Burnett's Business College
- Occupation: Politician; miller; public official; accountant

Daniel H. Carroll (July 23, 1878 – May 6, 1966), also known as "Daniel H. Carroll of P." was an American politician and deputy state auditor from Maryland. He served as a member of the Maryland House of Delegates, representing Harford County, from 1902 to 1905.

== Early life ==
Daniel H. Carroll was born near Bel Air, Maryland, on July 23, 1878, to Patrick Carroll. His father was a contractor in Bel Air. He was educated at Bel Air Academy. He graduated from Eaton & Burnett's Business College in Baltimore in 1898.

== Career ==
Carroll worked as a miller at Rock Run. He then worked in merchandising. In 1905, Carroll opened a grocery and provision store in Bel Air.

Carroll was a Democrat. He served as a member of the Maryland House of Delegates, representing Harford County, from 1902 to 1905.

From around 1905 to 1913, he worked with the Maryland Shell Fish Commission. Carroll worked as deputy register of wills in Harford County for four and a half years, starting in 1909. He served as a cost accountant in the United States Army Ordnance Corps during World War I.

In 1920, Carroll was appointed as deputy state auditor by Governor Albert Ritchie. In 1925, Carroll discovered a shortage of US$47,000 at the House of Corrections and in 1926, he found a missing US$16,000 at the office of the Commissioner of Motor Vehicles. In 1930, Carroll found an irregularity of US$31,000 in a water sewer contract in Baltimore County. In 1928, a probe of the State Roads Commission found a shortage of US$376,000 (equivalent to about $7,050,000 in 2025). Governor Ritchie and Carroll paid for advertisements in The Baltimore Sun to refute each other's statements relating to the 1928 probe. Carroll later resigned his post.

Carroll then became an accountant for Baltimore city firms. He ran twice for state comptroller, but lost. In the second contest in 1946, he lost the election to Governor J. Millard Tawes.

== Personal life ==
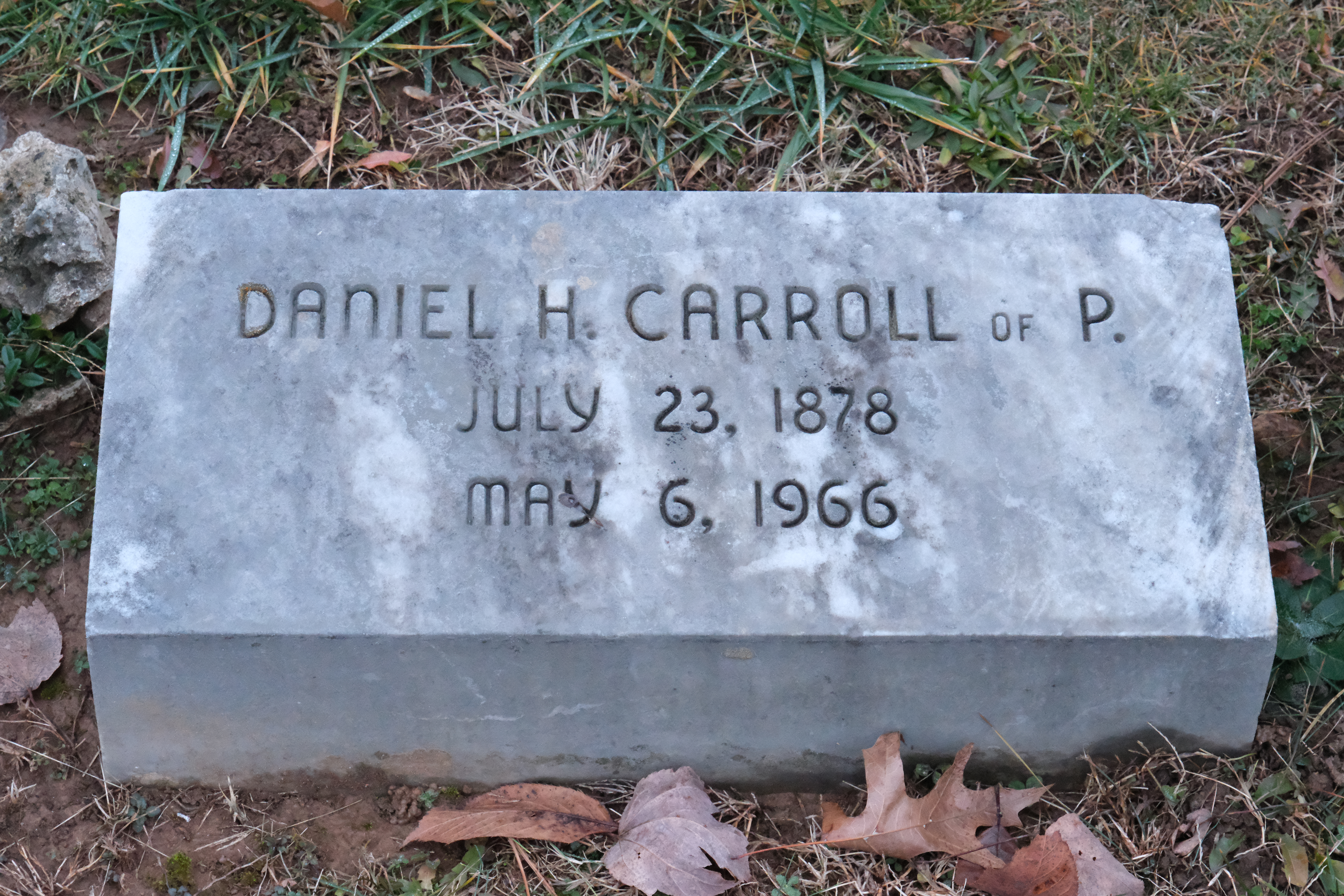
Grave of Carroll at Saint Ignatius Cemetery

Carroll married Elizabeth "Daisy" Dowling in 1900. They had one son and one daughter. His wife died in November 1914. Carroll married Grace Gibson, niece of John Archer and teacher at Bel Air High School, on January 2, 1915. He had four daughters and one son, Mrs. Charles E. Bredekamp, Mrs. Thomas F. Mullen, Mrs. J. Robert Sachse, Mrs. William J. Perkinson and Douglas L. Carroll was a Catholic. He lived at 806 Argonne Drive in Baltimore.

Carroll had a stroke on November 1, 1965. He died on May 6, 1966.
