= William S. Bowman (politician) =

American politician (1822–1901)

Member of the Maryland House of Delegates from the Harford County district
- In office 1888–1890 Serving with Harry W. Archer Jr., Noble L. Mitchell, Walter W. Preston

Personal details
- Born: December 17, 1822 Hopewell Cross Roads, Harford County, Maryland, U.S.
- Died: June 17, 1901 (aged 78) near Level, Maryland, U.S.
- Resting place: Rock Run Cemetery
- Party: Democratic
- Spouse: Mary Bailey (m. 1846; died 1894)
- Children: 7
- Occupation: Politician; engineer; farmer; businessman

William S. Bowman (December 17, 1822 – June 17, 1901) was an American politician and engineer from Maryland. He served as a member of the Maryland House of Delegates, representing Harford County from 1888 to 1890.

== Early life ==
William S. Bowman was born on December 17, 1822, in Hopewell Cross Roads, Harford County, Maryland, to Priscilla (née Keen) and Henry Bowman. His father was a farmer and owned a cooper shop in Hopewell Cross Roads. His parents were members of the Methodist Episcopal Church. At the age of 23, Bowman left his parents' farm and moved to a new farm purchased by his father. The farm was 50 acres (20 ha).

== Career ==
Bowman operated a cooper and cabinet shop until 1853. In 1853, Bowman started work as a civil engineer with the Baltimore and Ohio Railroad. He remained there until 1856. He then returned to his farm.

In 1860, Bowman was elected county supervisor of Harford County. He served in that role for ten years.

Bowman was a Democrat. He served as a member of the Maryland House of Delegates, representing Harford County from 1888 to 1890.

== Personal life ==
Bowman married Mary Bailey on June 27, 1846. They had seven children, Mary Emma, John H., George W., James L., William S., Charles C. and Rebecca. His wife died in 1894.

Bowman died on June 17, 1901, at his home near Level, Maryland. He was buried at Rock Run Cemetery.
