= George W. Richardson (Maryland politician) =

American politician and lawyer (died 1930)

Member of the Maryland House of Delegates from the Harford County district
- In office 1890–1892 Serving with William B. Hopkins, Noble L. Mitchell, Walter W. Preston

Personal details
- Died: March 12, 1930 Bel Air, Maryland, U.S.
- Resting place: St. Ignatius Cemetery; Hickory, Maryland, U.S.
- Party: Democratic
- Occupation: Politician; lawyer; justice of the peace

George W. Richardson (died March 12, 1930) was an American politician and lawyer from Maryland. He served as a member of the Maryland House of Delegates, representing Harford County from 1890 to 1892.

== Career ==
Richardson was a Democrat. He served as a member of the Maryland House of Delegates, representing Harford County from 1890 to 1892. He was a candidate for re-election in 1891, but lost.

Richardson worked as a lawyer in Baltimore and Bel Air. Richardson also served as justice of the peace in Bel Air for 41 years.

== Personal life ==
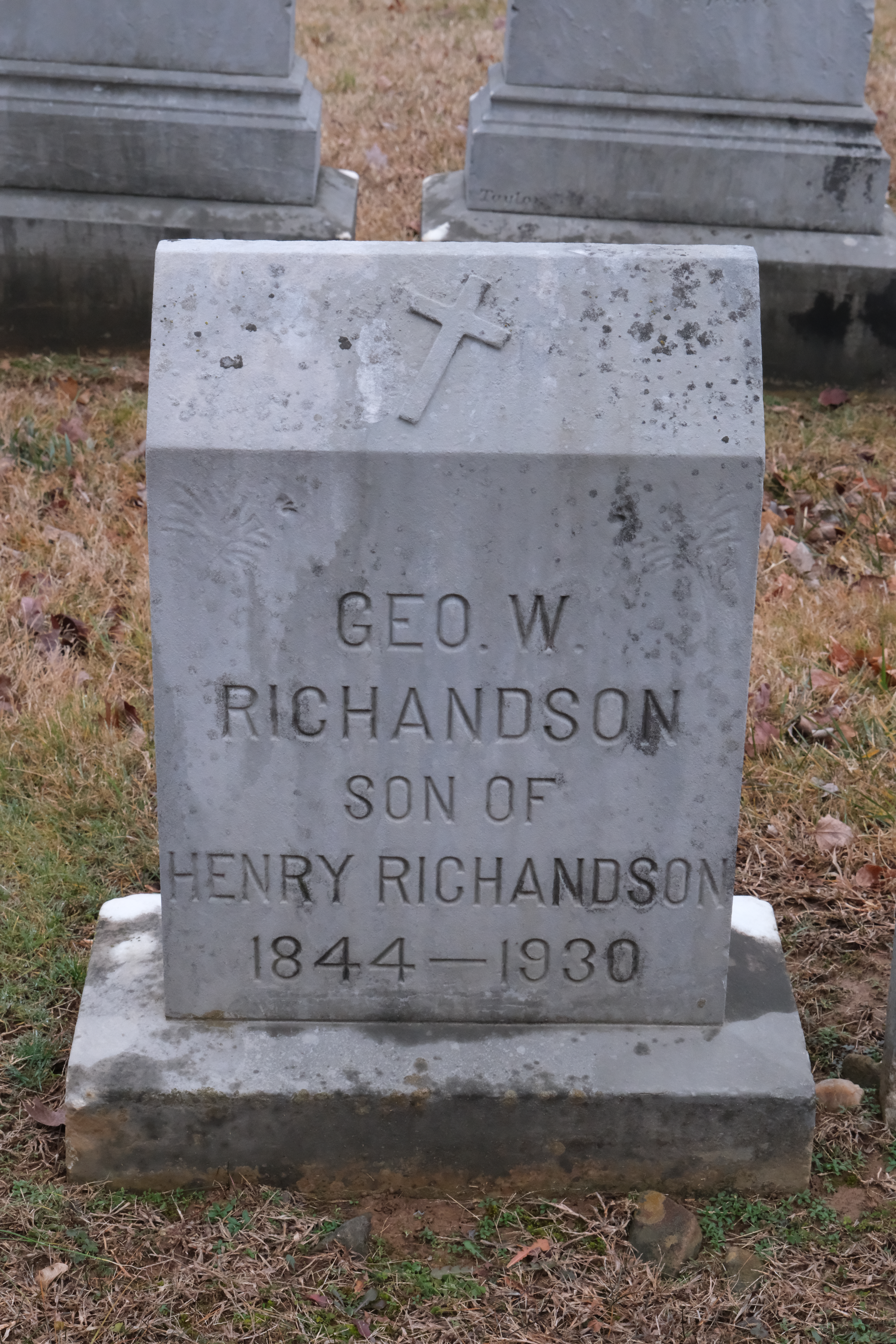
Grave of Richardson (misspelled as Richandson) at St. Ignatius Cemetery

Richardson died on March 12, 1930, at the age of 84 or 85, at his home in Bel Air. He was buried at St. Ignatius Cemetery in Hickory.
