= Gwynn's Falls, Baltimore =

Coordinates: 39°16′40″N 76°40′5″W

Gwynn's Falls
- Neighborhood
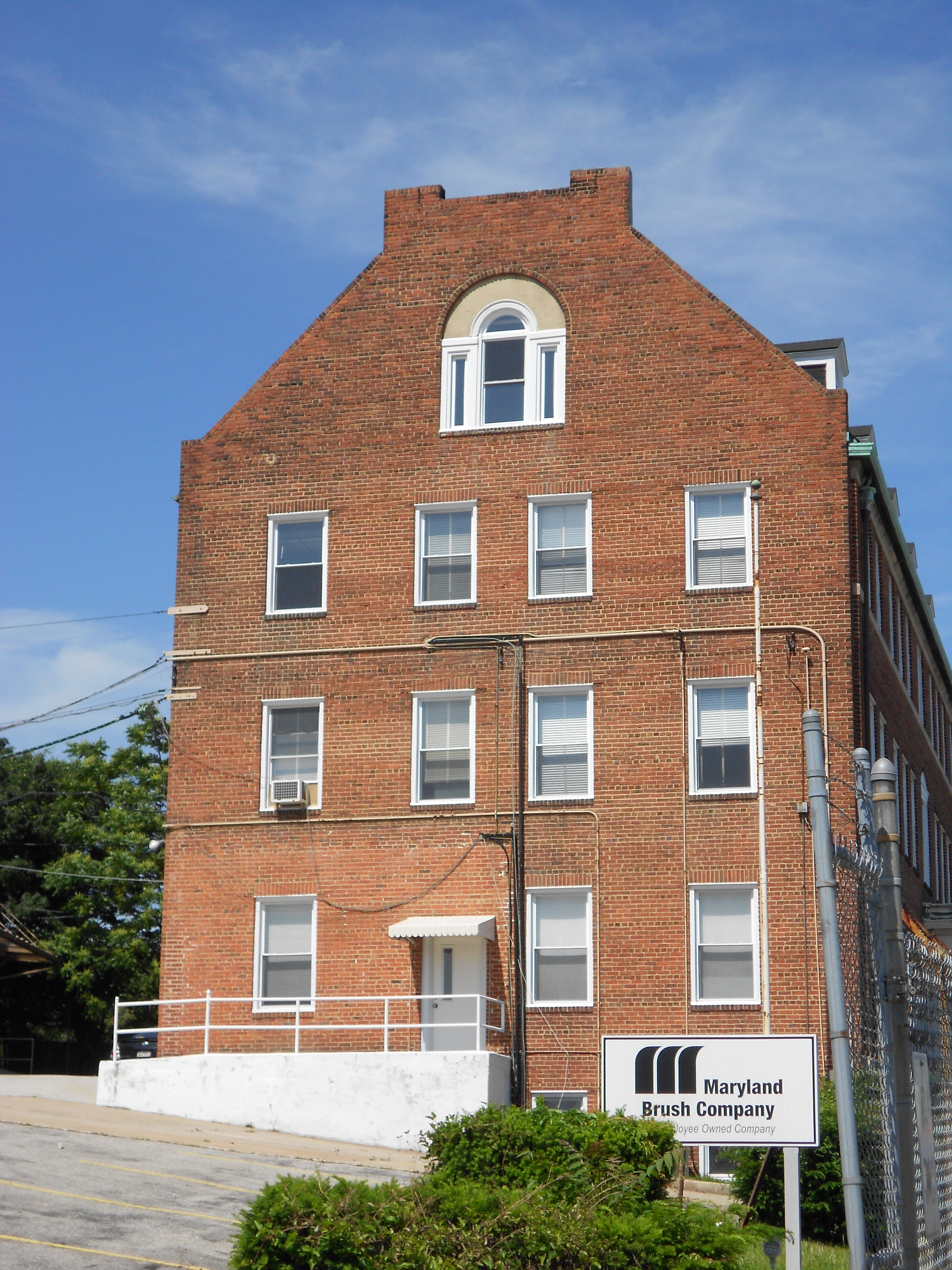
- Maryland Brush Company, located on Frederick Avenue in the Gwynn's Falls neighborhood

- Location within Baltimore
- Country: United States
- State: Maryland
- City: Baltimore
- Time zone: UTC-5 (Eastern)
  - Summer (DST): UTC-4 (EDT)
- ZIP code: 21223
- Area code: 410, 443, and 667

Gwynn's Falls is a neighborhood in the Southwestern District of Baltimore, located between Irvington (west) and Gwynns Falls Leakin Park (east). Frederick Avenue (Maryland Route 144) marks the neighborhood's boundary to the north; Wilkens Avenue (Maryland Route 372) draws its southern edge. Caton Avenue separates it from Irvington to the west.

Before 1977, the neighborhood was known as Carroll Station, for a station of the Pennsylvania Railroad formerly located here. Also known as the Frederick Road station, Carroll Station took its name from Charles Carroll of Carrollton, whose family previously owned the property now occupied by the Gwynn's Falls neighborhood.

== Significant landmarks ==
Maryland Brush Company, a manufacturer of industrial brushes, has been located at 3221 Frederick Avenue in the Gwynn's Falls neighborhood since the company’s founding in 1851. It became an employee-owned business in 1990. After losing their most significant customer in 2019, the employee owners agreed to sell the company. The location in Gwynn’s Falls closed in 2020 when the company’s assets and operations were purchased by Felton Brushes, Limited, a manufacturer in Ontario, Canada.

== See also ==
- List of Baltimore neighborhoods
