= Henry W. Archer =

American politician (1813–1887)

Member of the Maryland House of Delegates from the Harford County district
- In office 1844–1844 Serving with Frederick T. Amos, William J. Polk, George Yellott

Personal details
- Born: Henry Wilson Archer; April 18, 1813 Stafford, Harford County, Maryland, U.S.
- Died: July 8, 1887 (aged 74) near Bel Air, Maryland, U.S.
- Resting place: Green Mount Cemetery; Baltimore, Maryland, U.S.
- Party: Whig (until 1861); Democrat (1861 and after)
- Spouse: Mary E. Walker (m. 1849)
- Children: 9, including Henry W. Jr. and James
- Relatives: James J. Archer (brother)
- Education: Yale University; Hobart College; Union College
- Occupation: Politician

Henry Wilson Archer (April 18, 1813 – July 8, 1887) was an American politician from Maryland. He served as a member of the Maryland House of Delegates, representing Harford County in 1844.

== Early life ==
Henry Wilson Archer was born on April 18, 1813, in Stafford, Harford County, Maryland, as the second son of Ann and John Archer. His father was a physician. He attended Yale University from 1829 to 1830, but left during the Conic Sections Rebellion. He then attended Hobart College for a time before graduating from Union College in 1831. He read law with his brother-in-law Albert Constable. He was admitted to the bar in Baltimore in 1835. His brother was James J. Archer, general of the Confederate States Army.

== Career ==
Archer practiced law in Harford and Cecil counties.

Archer was a Whig until 1861, when he switched to the Democratic Party. Archer served as a member of the Maryland House of Delegates, representing Harford County in 1844. He served in Maryland's constitutional convention of 1867. In 1883, his name was mentioned for nomination as state governor.

== Personal life ==
Archer married Mary E. Walker, eldest daughter of Elizabeth and John W. Walker, of Chestertown on June 7, 1849. They had 11 children, including Henry W. Jr., Robert, James, William S., Graham, Lizzie, Mary, Nannie and Isabel. Archer lived in Bel Air. He owned farms in Harford, Cecil, Kent and Baltimore counties.

Archer died following intestinal and kidney troubles on July 8, 1887, at his Shamrock home near Bel Air. He was buried at Green Mount Cemetery in Baltimore.
