= Thomas Hitchcock (politician) =

American politician (died 1951)

Thomas J. Hitchcock

Member of the Maryland House of Delegates from the Harford County district
- In office 1904–1905 Serving with Charles A. Andrew, Daniel H. Carroll, George W. McComas
- Succeeded by: Edmund L. Oldfield

Personal details
- Born: May 14, 1862/1864 Upper Cross Roads, Harford County, Maryland, U.S.
- Died: June 24, 1951 Upper Cross Roads, Harford County, Maryland, U.S.
- Resting place: Providence Cemetery
- Party: Democratic
- Children: 2
- Occupation: Politician; farmer; merchant

Thomas J. Hitchcock (May 14, 1862 or 1864 – June 24, 1951) was an American politician from Maryland. He served as a member of the Maryland House of Delegates, representing Harford County, from 1904 to 1905.

== Early life ==
Thomas J. Hitchcock was born on May 14, 1862, or 1864, sources differ, at Upper Cross Roads in Harford County, Maryland, to Mary E. Hitchcock. He attended public schools in the county.

== Career ==
Hitchcock worked as a farmer and merchant.

Hitchcock was a Democrat. Hitchcock served as a member of the Maryland House of Delegates, representing Harford County, from 1904 to 1905. He was defeated in the 1905 election by Edmund L. Oldfield.

== Personal life ==
Hitchcock had two daughters, Mrs. Harry Webb and Mrs. Vernon Bachman.

Hitchcock died on June 24, 1951, at his home near Upper Cross Roads in Harford County. He was buried in Providence Cemetery.
