= Walter W. Preston =

American politician (1863–1951)

Member of the Maryland House of Delegates from the Harford County district
- In office 1888–1891 Serving with Harry W. Archer Jr., William S. Bowman, Noble L. Mitchell, William B. Hopkins, George W. Richardson

Personal details
- Born: January 14, 1863 Harford County, Maryland, U.S.
- Died: July 12, 1951 (aged 88) Emmorton, Maryland, U.S.
- Resting place: St. Mary's Episcopal Church; Emmorton, Maryland, U.S.
- Party: Democratic
- Spouse: Elizabeth "Lillie" Pue Hall (m. 1892; died 1937)
- Parent: James B. Preston (father)
- Relatives: James H. Preston (brother); Jacob A. Preston (grand uncle); John F. Preston (cousin)
- Education: St. John's College
- Alma mater: Princeton University (BA, MA); University of Maryland School of Law (LLB)
- Occupation: Politician; lawyer; judge; writer

Walter W. Preston (January 14, 1863 – July 12, 1951) was an American politician and judge from Maryland. He served as a member of the Maryland House of Delegates, representing Harford County from 1888 to 1891.

== Early life ==
Walter W. Preston was born on January 14, 1863, on a farm on Deer Creek in Harford County, Maryland, to Mary A. (née Wilks) and James B. Preston. His father was a member of the Maryland House of Delegates. He attended St. John's College in 1877, but transferred to Princeton University. He graduated from Princeton in 1881 with a Bachelor of Arts. He later received a Master of Arts. He graduated with a Bachelor of Laws from the University of Maryland School of Law in 1883. He was admitted to the bar in 1883. He was the brother of Baltimore mayor James H. Preston. His grand uncle was congressman Jacob A. Preston and his cousin was Army inspector general John F. Preston.

== Career ==
After graduating, Preston started a law practice in Bel Air.

Preston was a Democrat. He served as a member of the Maryland House of Delegates, representing Harford County from 1888 to 1891. In the 1890 session, he served as chair of the judiciary committee.

In 1891, Preston was elected as state's attorney in Harford County and served until 1895, serving two other terms. In 1920, Preston was appointed by Governor Albert Ritchie to succeed Judge McClean as judge of the Third Judicial Court. He served there for six years. He later became judge of the Circuit Court of Harford County after the retirement of Judge William M. Harlan.

Preston wrote The History of Harford County. In 1900, Preston organized the Savings Bank of Harford County (later the Commercial and Savings Bank of Bel Air). He retired in January 1949 as chairman of the board.

== Personal life ==
Preston married Elizabeth "Lillie" (née Pue) Hall, daughter of Michael Edward Pue, on November 2, 1892. She was previously married to Thomas Hall. She was president-general of the Maryland branch of the United Daughters of the Confederacy. They had no children. She died in 1937. Preston was a vestryman at St. Mary's Episcopal Church.

Preston died on July 12, 1951, at his home in Emmorton. He was buried at St. Mary's Episcopal Church in Emmorton.
