= Jacob A. Preston =

American politician (1796–1868)

Member of the U.S. House of Representatives from Maryland's 5th district
- In office March 4, 1843 – March 3, 1845
- Preceded by: William Cost Johnson
- Succeeded by: Albert Constable

Personal details
- Born: Jacob Alexander Preston; March 12, 1796 Bel Air, Harford County, Maryland, U.S.
- Died: August 2, 1868 (aged 72) Perryman, Maryland, U.S.
- Resting place: Old Spesutia Cemetery; Perryman, Maryland, U.S.
- Party: Whig
- Spouse: Caroline Perryman
- Relatives: John F. Preston (grandson); Walter W. Preston (grand-nephew)
- Education: University of Maryland, Baltimore (MD)
- Profession: Politician; physician

Military service
- Allegiance: United States
- Rank: Lieutenant
- Battles/wars: War of 1812

Jacob Alexander Preston (March 12, 1796 – August 2, 1868) was a U.S. representative from Maryland.

== Early life ==
Jacob Alexander Preston was born on March 12, 1796, at the "Vineyard" in Bel Air, Maryland, to Sarah (née Bond) and Bernard Preston. His grandfather was Jacob Bond, a large land owner near Bel Air. He attended the common schools and graduated from the medical department of the University of Maryland at Baltimore in 1816 with a Doctor of Medicine.

== Career ==
Preston started his medical practice in Perryman, Maryland, but also practiced in Harford, Baltimore, and Cecil counties. He also engaged in agricultural pursuits, and served as lieutenant of a Maryland regiment in the War of 1812.

Preston was elected as a Whig to the Twenty-eighth Congress (March 4, 1843 – March 3, 1845). He was not a candidate for renomination in 1844, and resumed the practices of medicine and agriculture.

== Personal life ==
Preston married Caroline Perryman, daughter of George Perryman. His children included Emily, John Fisher and J. Alexander. His grandson John F. Preston served as Army inspector general. His grand nephew was judge Walter W. Preston.

Preston died on August 2, 1868, at his home in Perryman. He is interred in Old Spesutia Cemetery, St. George's Churchyard in Perryman.

U.S. House of Representatives
Preceded by William Cost Johnson	U.S. Congressman from the 5th district of Maryland; 1843–1845	Succeeded by Albert Constable
