= Thomas Run Church =

Historic church in Maryland, United States

- U.S. National Register of Historic Places
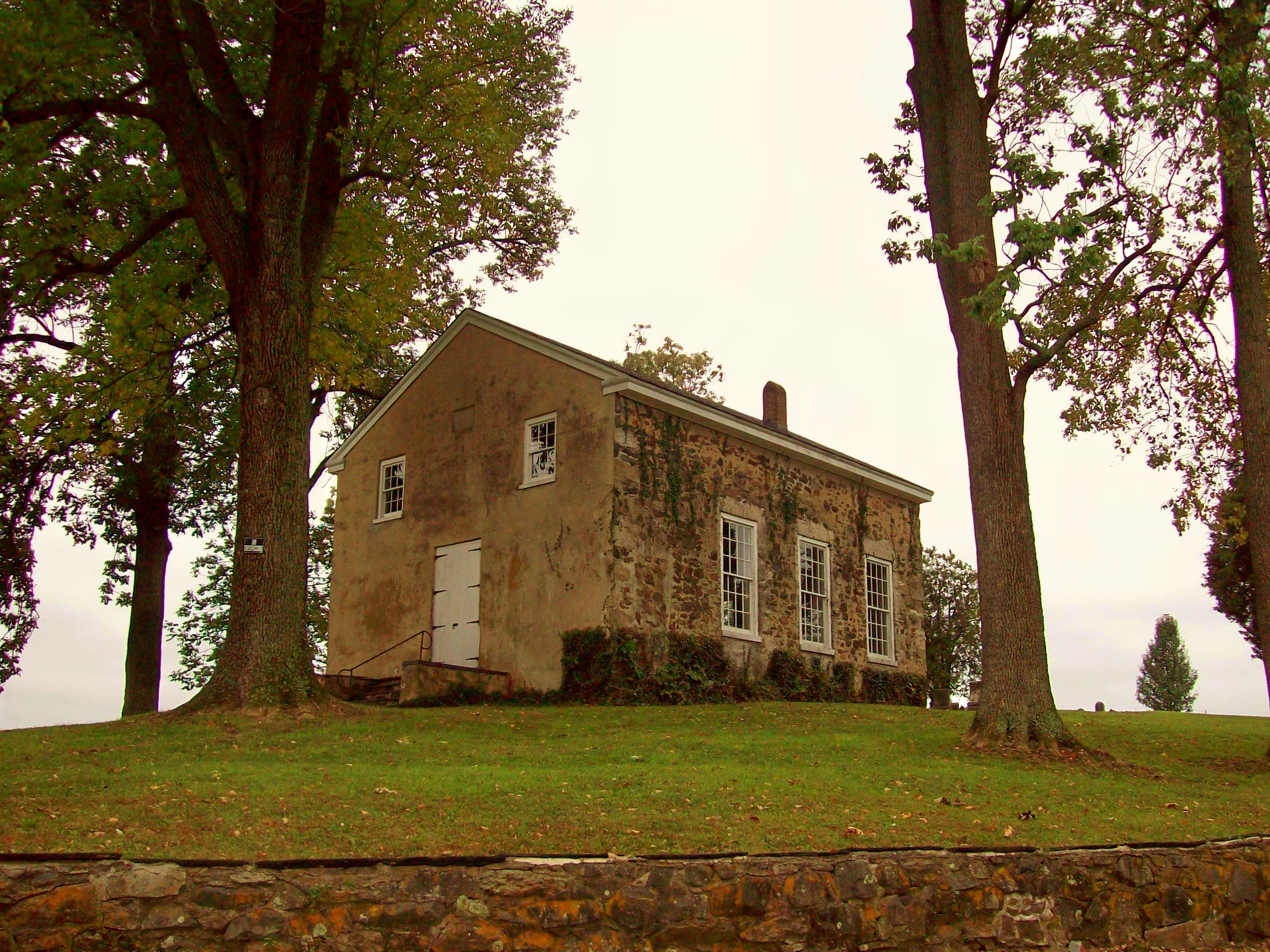
- Watters Meeting House in 2011

- Location within Maryland Location within the United States
- Location: Northeast of Bel Air off Maryland Route 136, near Bel Air, Maryland
- Coordinates: 39°35′32″N 76°17′34″W
- Area: 2 acres (0.81 ha)
- NRHP reference No.: 78001466
- Added to NRHP: January 3, 1978

Thomas Run Church, also known as Watters Meeting House, is a historic Methodist church in Bel Air, Harford County, Maryland. It is a one-story, rubble stone, three-bay church with a slate-covered gabled roof and was among the first structures used by Methodists in colonial America.

It was listed on the National Register of Historic Places in 1978.

== Gallery ==
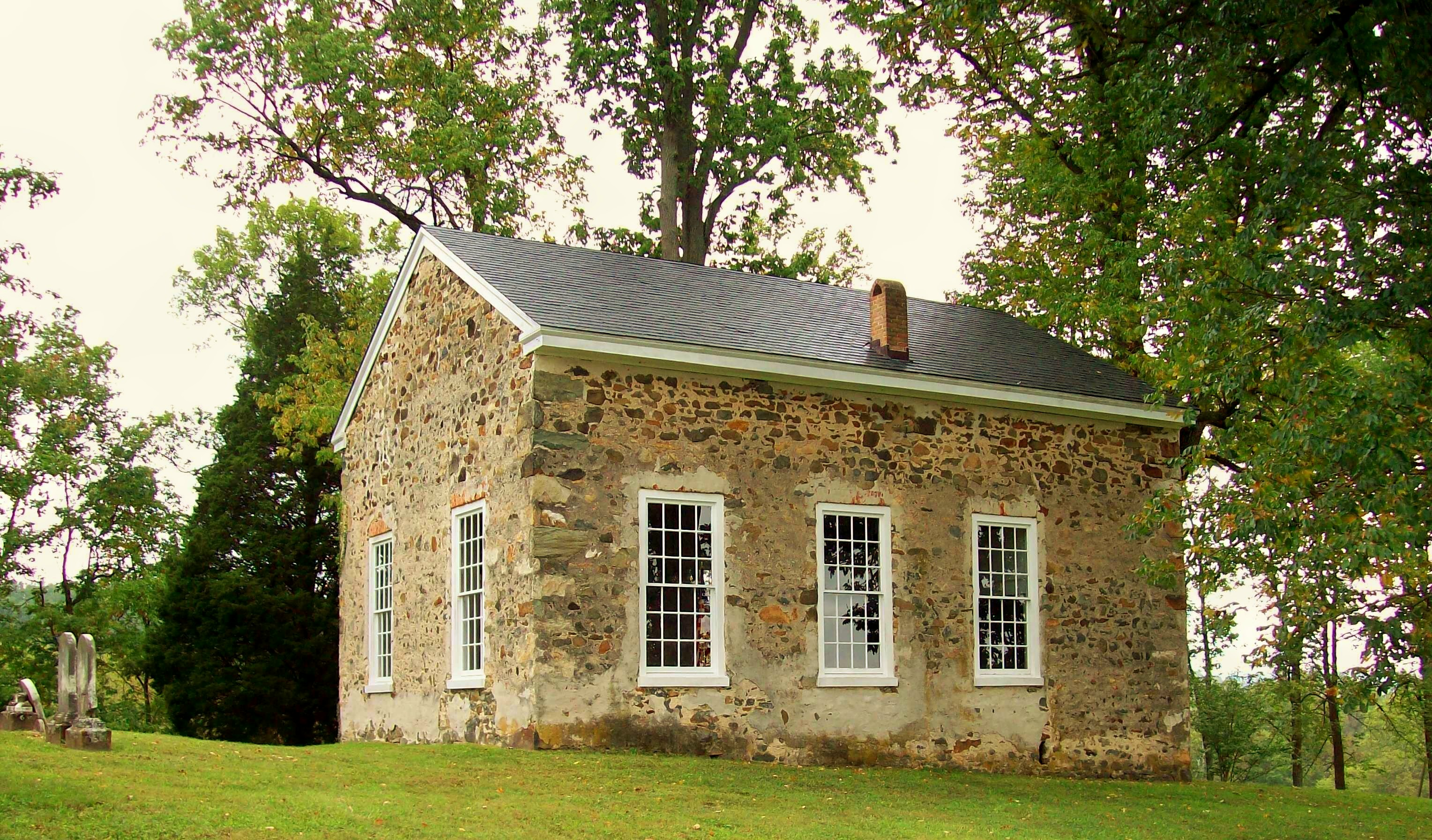
Rear view

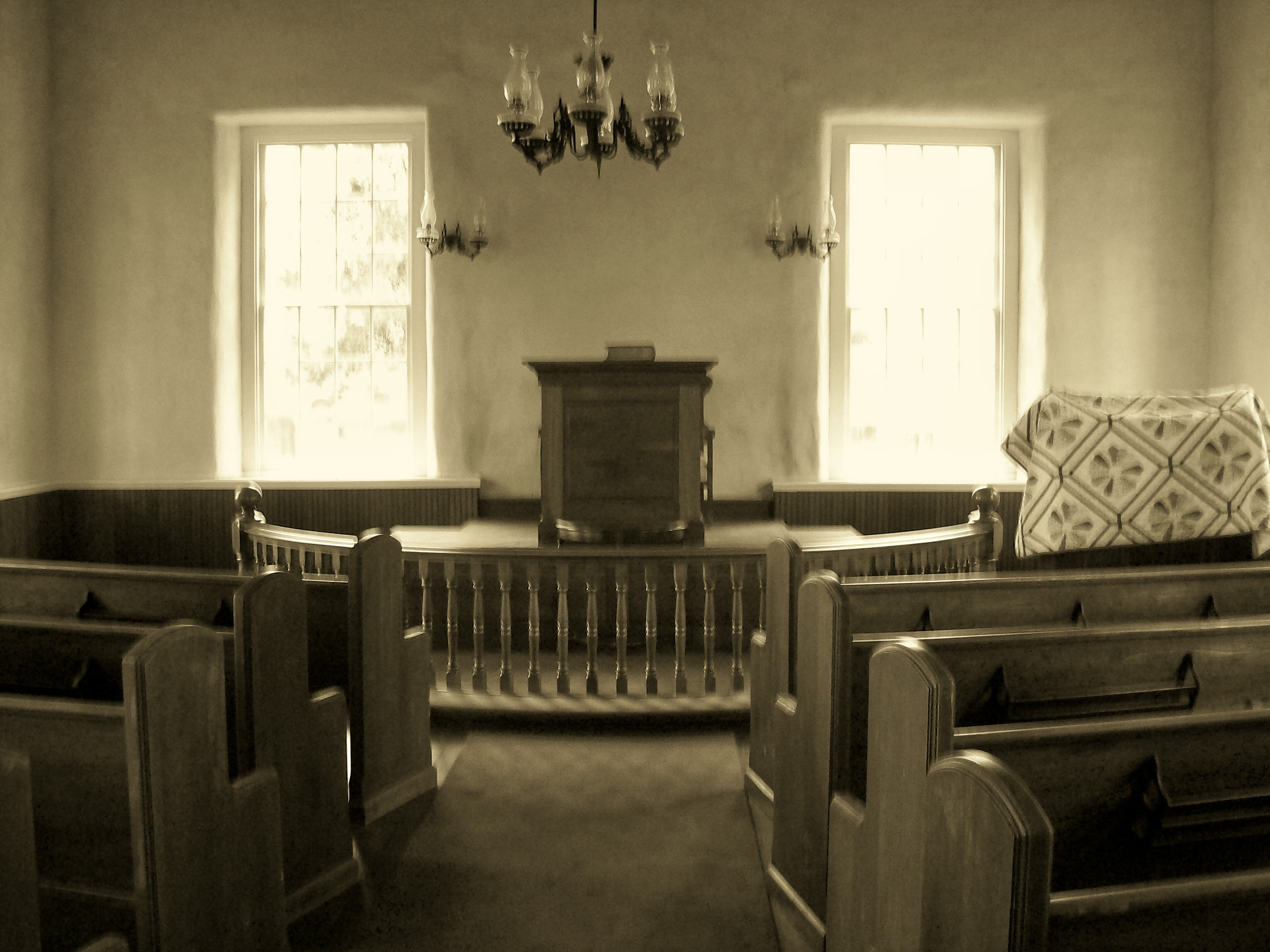
Interior
