= Harry W. Archer Jr. =

American politician and lawyer (died 1910)

Member of the Maryland House of Delegates from the Harford County district
- In office 1888–1890 Serving with William S. Bowman, Noble L. Mitchell, Walter W. Preston

Personal details
- Born: Henry Wilson Archer Jr. August 25, 1856
- Died: June 15, 1910 (aged 54) Bel Air, Maryland, U.S.
- Resting place: Green Mount Cemetery; Baltimore, Maryland, U.S.
- Party: Democratic
- Spouse: Hannah Bryarly Lee (1871–1939)
- Parent: Henry W. Archer (father)
- Relatives: James J. Archer (brother)
- Education: Princeton University; University of Maryland School of Law
- Occupation: Politician; lawyer

Henry Wilson Archer Jr. (August 25, 1854 – June 15, 1910), better known as Harry W. Archer Jr., was an American politician and lawyer from Maryland. He served as a member of the Maryland House of Delegates, representing Harford County from 1888 to 1890.

== Early life ==
Henry Wilson Archer Jr. was born on August 25, 1854, to Mary E. (née Walker) and Henry W. Archer. His father was a lawyer and state delegate. His brother was James J. Archer. He graduated from Princeton University in 1875. He read law with his father and graduated from the University of Maryland School of Law. He was admitted to the bar in 1878.

== Career ==
Archer worked as a lawyer from 1878 to 1909.

Archer was a Democrat. He served as a member of the Maryland House of Delegates, representing Harford County from 1888 to 1890.

== Personal life ==
Archer married Miss Lee, daughter of Otho S. Lee. Archer was a member of the Protestant Episcopal Church in Bel Air.

Archer died of heart failure on June 15, 1910, at the age of 54, at his Shamrock home in Bel Air. He was buried at Green Mount Cemetery in Baltimore.
