= Charles Hitchcock =

Charles Hitchcock may refer to:

- Charles B. Hitchcock (died 1875), American politician
- Charles Henry Hitchcock (1836–1919), American geologist
- Charles Leo Hitchcock (1902–1986), American botanist
