= Charles H. McNabb =

American politician and lawyer (died 1955)

Member of the Maryland House of Delegates from the Harford County district
- In office 1914–1916 Serving with Thomas C. Hopkins and Noble L. Mitchell

Personal details
- Died: May 7, 1955 (aged 78) Baltimore, Maryland, U.S.
- Resting place: Darlington Cemetery
- Party: Democratic
- Spouse: V. Catherine
- Parent: J. Martin McNabb (father)
- Education: St. John's College (BA)
- Occupation: Politician; lawyer; educator

Charles H. McNabb (died May 7, 1955) was an American politician and lawyer from Maryland. He served in the Maryland House of Delegates, representing Harford County, from 1914 to 1916.

== Early life ==
Charles H. McNabb was born to Sarah Ellen (née Savin) and J. Martin McNabb. His father was a lawyer and member of the Maryland legislature. He graduated from Bel Air Academy in 1894. He attended St. John's College in Annapolis, Maryland, on a scholarship. He graduated in 1898 with a Bachelor of Arts. He was a member of the track team. McNabb was admitted to the bar. He was admitted to the bar in 1904.

== Career ==
McNabb served as vice principal of Bel Air High School from 1898 to 1904.

McNabb was a Democrat. He was elected as a member of the Maryland House of Delegates, representing Harford County, from 1914 to 1916. In 1916, he was appointed by Governor Albert Ritchie as a member of the Maryland Board of Education. He served in that role until his resignation to serve as attorney to the county commissioners. He worked as a lawyer for over 50 years.

In 1926, McNabb became director of the Harford National Bank and served as director until its closing in 1932. He was elected director of the Harford Mutual Insurance Company in 1938.

== Personal life ==
In 1907, McNabb became a Worshipful Master of the Mt. Ararat Lodge of Masons and became a member of its board of trustees.

McNabb married V. Catherine. He lived in Cardiff, Maryland. He died on May 7, 1955, aged 78, at Union Memorial Hospital in Baltimore. He was buried in Darlington Cemetery.
