= Benjamin Silver =

American politician (1810–1894)

Benjamin Silver III

Member of the Maryland House of Delegates from the Harford County district
- In office 1868–1868 Serving with John S. Brown, Nicholas H. Nelson, Robert R. Vandiver

Personal details
- Born: March 26, 1810
- Died: April 25, 1894 (aged 84) near Harmony, Maryland, U.S.
- Resting place: Harmony Presbyterian Church
- Party: Democratic
- Spouse: Emily M. Pannell (m. 1846, died)
- Children: 3, including Benjamin Jr.
- Education: Yale College

Benjamin Silver III (March 26, 1810 – April 25, 1894) was an American politician and farmer from Maryland. He served in the Maryland House of Delegates in 1868.

== Early life ==
Benjamin Silver III was born on March 26, 1810, in Harford County, Maryland, to Charity (née Warnock) and Benjamin Silver Jr. His father was a farmer, landholder, and owned a fishing business in Harford County. Silver attended common schools and attended a classical school near Rock Run taught by Thompson Hudson. Silver attended Yale College in the class of 1833 for preparatory studies of medicine, but did not complete his studies.

== Career ==
In November 1832, Silver entered his brother Philip W.'s mercantile business in Darlington. After fourteen years, he left the business. Silver started farming at his farm near Glenville around 1848. He was also engaged with his father's fishery business. In 1848, he petitioned against a railroad company building a bridge over the Havre de Grace river. He also petitioned against lottery grants. Silver was a Democrat. Silver served as a member of the Maryland House of Delegates in 1868.

Silver was an elder and trustee of Deer Creek Harmony Presbyterian Church since its organization in 1855. He was a slaveholder and supported the Confederate cause during the Civil War.

== Personal life ==
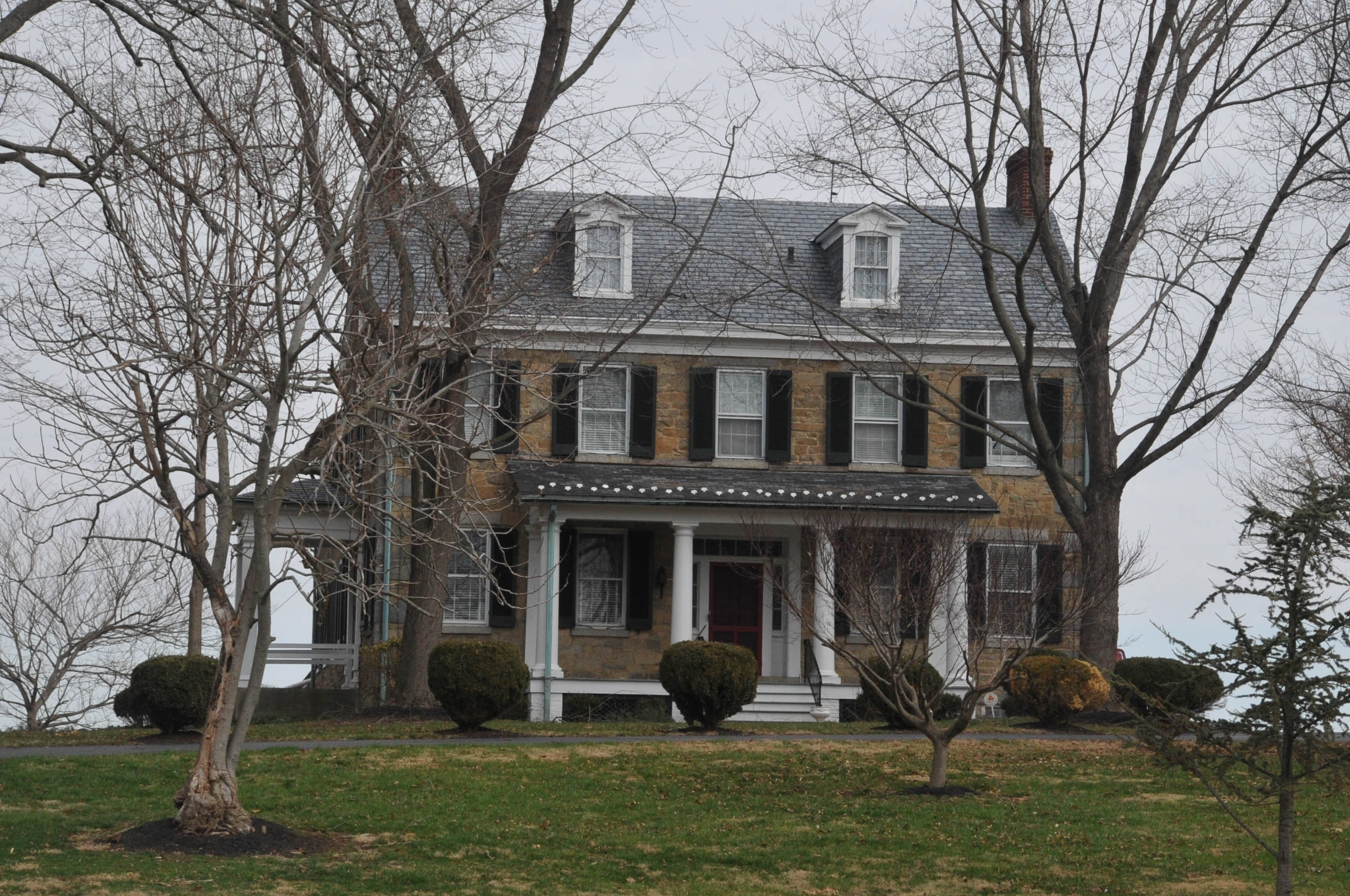
Benjamin Silver House in 2007

Silver married Emily M. Pannell in 1846. They had three children, Benjamin Jr., Mary W. and Mrs. Griffin T. Milton. Silver's wife predeceased him. Silver was a Presbyterian. He was also a diarist, land surveyor, amateur architect and machinist. He was a beekeeper and kept bees in Darlington. The Benjamin Silver III House on Harmony Church Road near Darlington was owned by him and is part of the Silver Houses Historic District.

Silver died on April 25, 1894, at his home near Harmony, Maryland. He was buried at Deer Creek Harmony Presbyterian Church.
