= Franklin Whitaker =

American politician (died 1891)

Member of the Maryland Senate
- In office 1860–1864
- Preceded by: Edwin H. Webster
- Succeeded by: William F. Bayless
- Constituency: Harford County

Personal details
- Died: January 5, 1891 (aged 73) near Bel Air, Maryland, U.S.
- Party: Southern Rights
- Children: 12
- Occupation: Politician

Franklin Whitaker (died January 5, 1891) was an American politician from Maryland. He served as a member of the Maryland Senate, representing Harford County, from 1860 to 1864.

== Career ==
In 1851, Whitaker had a mill built with slave labor near Winters Run in Harford County, Maryland. The mill was called Whitaker's Mill.

Whitaker was a member of the Southern Rights Party. Whitaker served as a member of the Maryland Senate, representing Harford County, from 1860 to 1864. He also served as school commissioner in Harford County.

Whitaker was a member of the board of trustees of the Bel Air Academy. In January 1882, Judge Watters appointed Whitaker as a school commissioner of Harford County. He was re-appointed by Judge Watters in January 1884. He resigned from the role in July 1885.

== Personal life ==
Whitaker was married and had eight sons and four daughters, Samuel Jr. (died 1870), Nicholas Bond (died 1880), Elijah J. B., William, Franklin Jr., George, Henry, Howard, Elizabeth, Harriet, Mrs. W. H. Brookes and Virginia. In 1880, his son Franklin Jr. murdered a man.

Whitaker died of heart disease on January 5, 1891, at the age of 73, at his "Dunkale" home near Bel Air, Maryland.
