= William F. Bayless =

American politician (1814–1873)

William Finney Bayless

Member of the Maryland Senate
- In office 1864
- Preceded by: Franklin Whitaker
- Succeeded by: William B. Stephenson
- Constituency: Harford County

Member of the Maryland House of Delegates from the Harford County district
- In office 1860 – July 1861 Serving with Richard B. McCoy, Joshua Wilson

Personal details
- Born: August 25, 1814 Glenville, Maryland, U.S.
- Died: February 23, 1873 (aged 58) Glenville, Maryland, U.S.
- Resting place: Harmony Presbyterian Church; Havre de Grace, Maryland, U.S.
- Spouse(s): Eleanor Brooke (m. 1842) Sarah Elizabeth Hanna (m. 1853)
- Children: 8
- Occupation: Politician; farmer

William Finney Bayless (August 25, 1814 – February 23, 1873) was an American politician and farmer from Maryland. He served in the Maryland House of Delegates from 1860 to 1861 and the Maryland Senate in 1864.

== Early life ==
William Finney Bayless was born on August 25, 1814, at the Bayless homestead, near the Deer Creek Harmony Presbyterian Church, in Glenville, Maryland, to Mary (née Silver) and Zephaniah Bayless. He attended the private and classical schools in the area.

== Career ==
Bayless worked as a farmer. Bayless served in the Maryland House of Delegates, representing Harford County, from 1860 to July 1861. In 1863, Bayless was nominated by the Union Party for the Maryland Senate. He represented Harford County in the senate in 1864.

Bayless served as school commissioner in Harford County. He also served as president of the county board of school commissioners.

Bayless was a Presbyterian. Bayless helped build the Deer Creek Harmony Presbyterian Church. He served as trustee in 1839. He also served as secretary and treasurer of the church for 34 years. He was an elder and clerk of the church for 18 years, up until his death. He served as trustee and secretary of the board of the Churchville Presbyterian Church from January 1845 to April 1856.

== Personal life ==
Bayless married Eleanor Brooke on November 30, 1842. They had two children, Samuel Martin (born 1847) and Eleanor (1849–1862). Bayless married Sarah Elizabeth Hanna on June 1, 1853. They had six children, William Hanna (born 1854), John Zephaniah (born 1856), Oliver Parker (1861–1862), Mary Ellenor (born 1864), Betty (born 1865) and Lillian Jane (1870–1892).

Bayless died on February 23, 1873, at his home near Glenville. He was buried at Harmony Presbyterian Church in Havre de Grace, Maryland.
