= George Archer (architect) =

American architect (1848-1920)

- Born: March 1848; Churchville, Maryland, U.S.
- Died: January 6, 1920 (aged 71); Baltimore, Maryland, U.S.
- Resting place: Churchville Presbyterian Church cemetery
- Education: Princeton University
- Occupation: Architect
- Father: Thomas Archer
- Relatives: R. Harris Archer (brother)

George Archer (March 1848 – January 6, 1920) was an American architect from Maryland. He designed several churches, banks, and other buildings in Maryland.

== Early life ==
George Archer was born in March 1848 at Allendale in Churchville, Maryland, to Thomas Archer. He attended public and private schools and graduated from Princeton University in 1870. He graduated Princeton with his friend Stevenson A. Williams.

== Career ==
After graduation, Archer moved to Baltimore. He worked as an architect in Harford County and Baltimore. He was chief consulting architect at Johns Hopkins University. Around 1905, he formed the firm Archer and Allen.

== Works ==
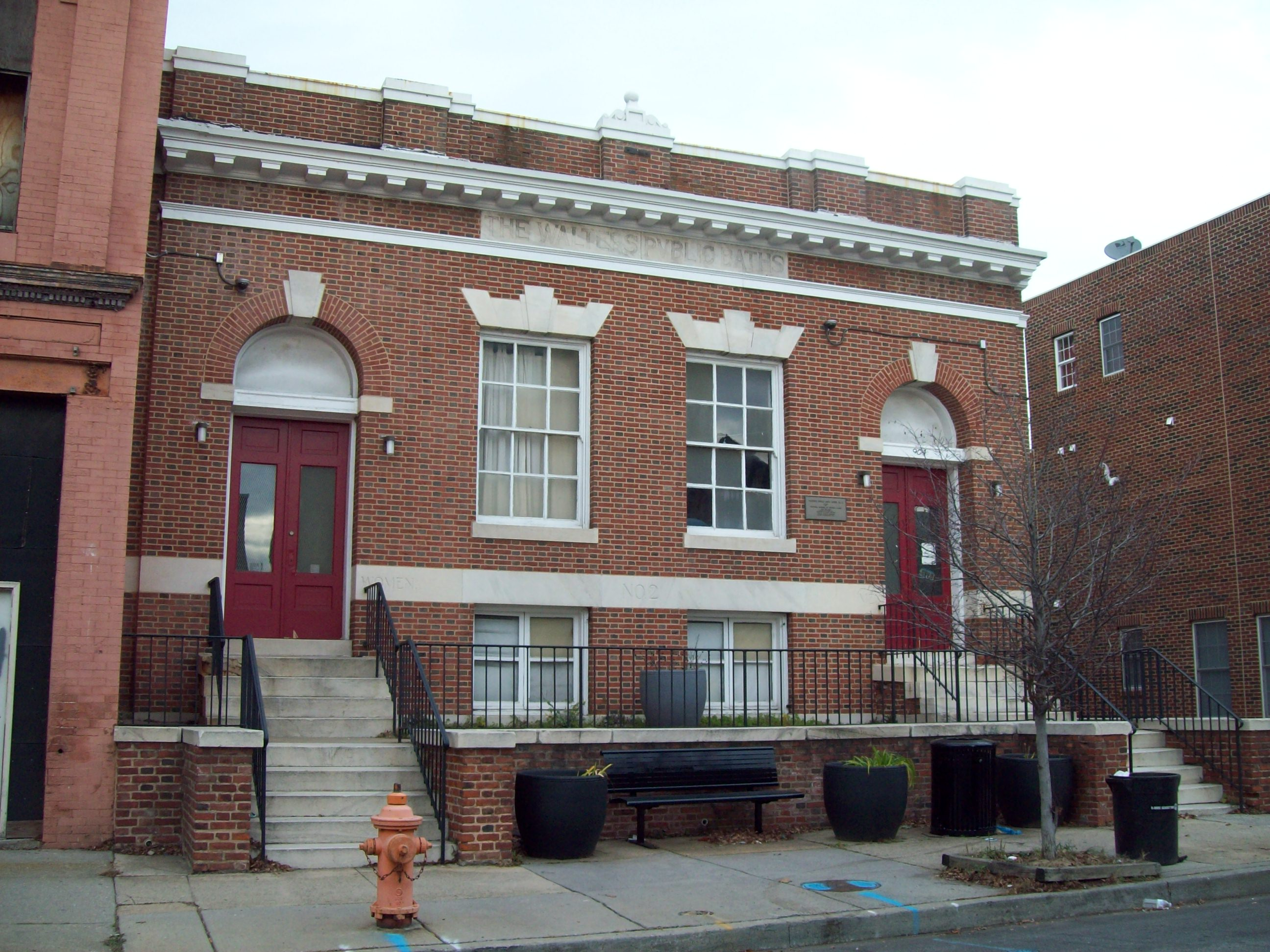
Walters Bath No. 2

- Harford National Bank at Bel Air, Maryland
- Second Bank, Harford County, Maryland
- Walters Bath No. 2 on the 900 block of Washington Boulevard, in the southwest area of Baltimore, Maryland in the Pigtown / Washington Village neighborhood.
- Two private homes in Sudbrook Park, Maryland on the west side of suburban Baltimore County.
- Buildings at the College of Notre Dame of Maryland, on North Charles Street, (later renamed the Notre Dame of Maryland University)
- Graham-Hughes House, his 1888 landmark residence on the southwest corner of North Charles and West Madison Streets, facing Washington Place and the famous Washington Monument in the Mount Vernon-Belvedere neighborhood of central Baltimore, Maryland.

== Personal life ==
Archer did not marry. His brother was R. Harris Archer.

Archer died on January 6, 1920, following an operation for diabetes at Union Protestant Infirmary in Baltimore. He was buried at Churchville Presbyterian Church cemetery.
