= Carroll Park =

Park in Baltimore, Maryland, US

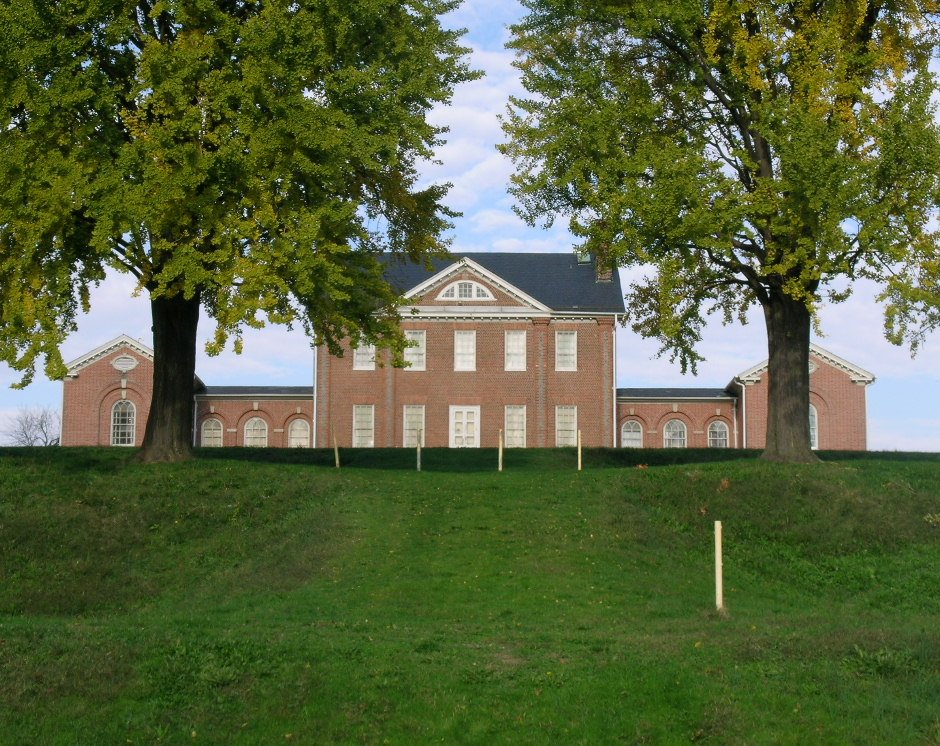
- Mount Clare Mansion
- Interactive map of Carroll Park
- Type: Public park
- Location: 1500 Washington Boulevard; Baltimore, MD 21230
- Coordinates: 39.276°N 76.654°W
- Area: 117 acres (47 ha)
- Created: 1890
- Operator: City of Baltimore

Carroll Park is a nearly 117-acre (47 ha) public park located in the historic Washington Village-Pigtown neighborhood in southwestern Baltimore, Maryland. The park is bordered by Washington Boulevard to the south, Monroe Street to the west, Bayard Street to the east, and the Mount Clare Branch of the Baltimore Terminal Subdivision railroad to the north. The park also extends westward beyond the Montgomery Ward Warehouse and Retail Store to include the Carroll Park Golf Course.

== History ==
Acquired by the City of Baltimore in 1890, Carroll Park is Baltimore's third oldest urban park. The park's namesake comes from the historic Carroll family, who owned the property surrounding Mount Clare Mansion. After the Carrolls left Mount Clare in 1840, German immigrants leased the land for private use, using the name Schuetzen Park. Once under city ownership, the property was landscaped for public use by the Olmsted Brothers.

The Carroll Park Golf Course is notable for being one of the first golf courses racially integrated in 1951 due to civilian protests.

Carroll Park features the historic Mount Clare Museum House, a golf course, basketball courts, baseball fields, and a skate-park.

== See also ==
- Mount Clare, the Carroll mansion located in the center of the park.
- Mount Clare Shops, railroad yards adjacent to the B&O Railroad Museum.
