= Benjamin Silver Jr. =

American politician (died 1890)

Member of the Maryland Senate
- In office 1890
- Preceded by: John Sappington
- Succeeded by: Thomas H. Robinson
- Constituency: Harford County

Member of the Maryland House of Delegates
- In office 1884–1886 Serving with R. Harris Archer, J. Martin McNabb, Jacob H. Plowman
- Constituency: Harford County

Personal details
- Born: Harford County, Maryland, U.S.
- Died: July 26, 1890 (aged 32) Glenville, Maryland, U.S.
- Party: Democratic
- Spouse: Fanny Howard Archer (m. 1888)
- Parent: Benjamin Silver (father)
- Education: Lafayette College
- Occupation: Politician

Benjamin Silver Jr. (died July 26, 1890) was an American politician from Maryland. He served in the Maryland House of Delegates in the 1884 and 1886 sessions. He served in the Maryland Senate from 1890 to his death.

== Early life ==
Benjamin Silver Jr. was born in Harford County, Maryland, to Emily M. (née Pannell) and Benjamin Silver. His father was a farmer and served in the Maryland House of Delegates. Silver attended county schools and graduated from Lafayette College in 1877. He worked in the canning business in Harford County.

== Career ==
Silver was a Democrat. Silver served in the Maryland House of Delegates in 1884 and 1886. Silver defeated William Benjamin Baker in 1889 for the Maryland Senate and served in 1890 until his death. Silver was chairman of the committee on railroads and canals. He was involved in the proceedings for the lease of the Chesapeake and Ohio Canal to the Washington and Cumberland Railroad Company.

== Personal life ==
Silver married Fanny Howard Archer, daughter of Stevenson Archer on October 10, 1888.

Silver died on July 26, 1890, at the age of 32, from peritonitis at his home in Glenville, Maryland.
