= Walters Bath No. 2 =

- U.S. National Register of Historic Places
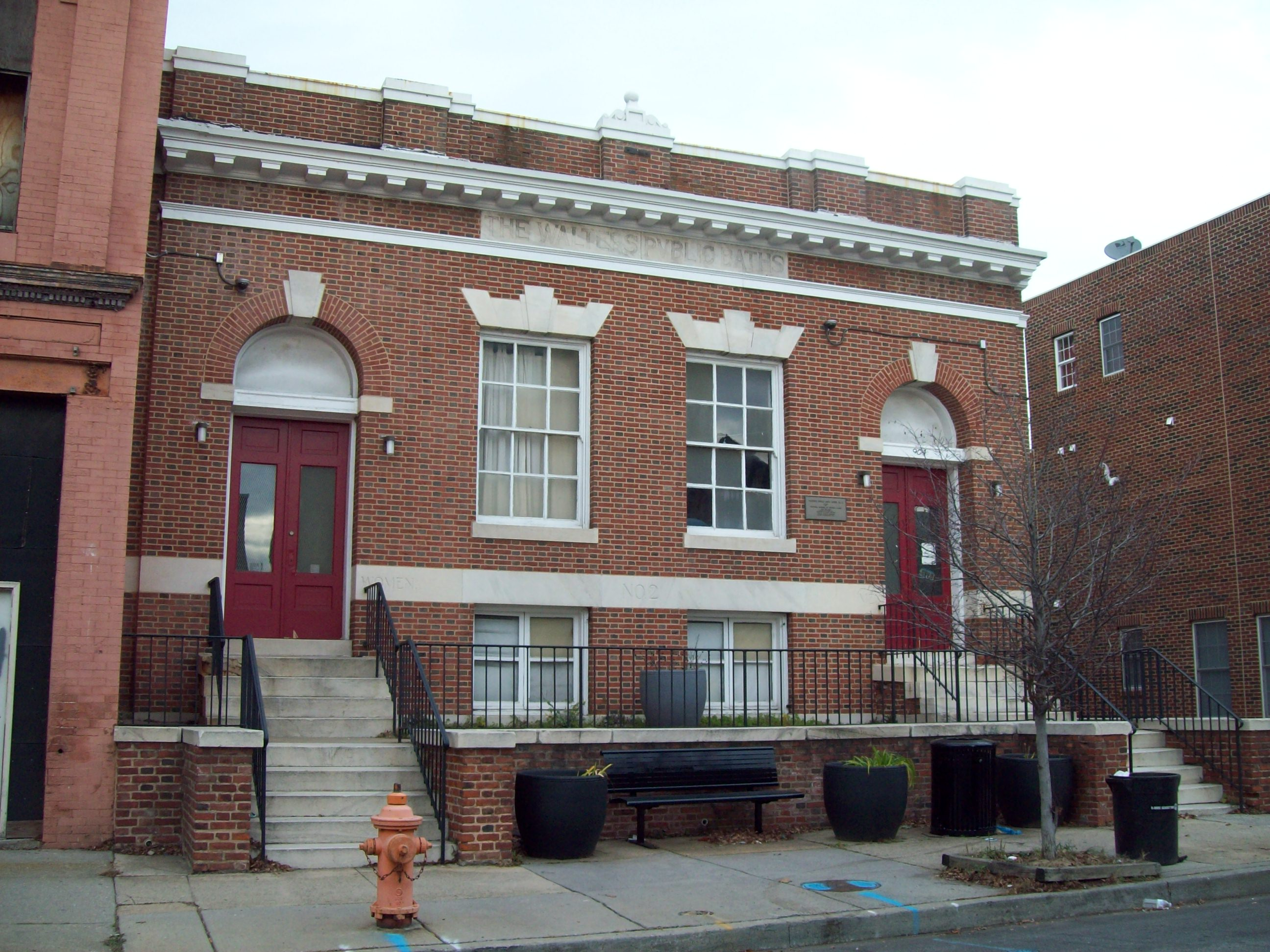
- Walters Bath House No. 2, 900 block Washington Boulevard, Pigtown in southwest Baltimore, December 2011

- Location within Baltimore Location within Maryland Location within the United States
- Location: 900 Washington Boulevard, Baltimore, Maryland
- Coordinates: 39°16′59″N 76°37′52″W
- Area: less than one acre
- Built: 1901
- Architect: Archer, George (1848-1920); Hughes, John, Jr.
- Architectural style: Late 19th And 20th Century Revivals, Renaissance Revival
- NRHP reference No.: 79003220
- Added to NRHP: June 19, 1979

Walters Bath No. 2 is a historic bath house located in southwest Baltimore, Maryland, United States. It is a small brick building of 40 by 70.5 feet (12.2 by 21.5 m) laid in Flemish bond with black headers and Maryland limestone trimming. It was constructed in a very simplified form of Renaissance Revival architecture popularized at the turn of the 20th century. The bath house in the 900 block, Washington Boulevard (U.S. Route 1) in the southwest area of Pigtown / Washington Village, was built for the City of Baltimore by Henry Walters (1848–1931), who contributed four bath houses to the city. It was co-designed by architect George Archer (1848–1920), and constructed in 1901. Architect Archer was trained at Princeton University and lived in a landmark townhouse of white marble at the southeast corner of North Charles and West Madison Streets, facing Washington Place and the famous Washington Monument. The public bath system was abolished 60 years later, at the end of 1959 with the general extension of indoor plumbing and public water systems in the city's densely packed row houses residential neighborhoods.

Walters Bath No. 2 was listed on the National Register of Historic Places in 1979.
