= Joshua Wilson (Maryland politician) =

American politician and physician (1797–1885)

Member of the Maryland House of Delegates from the Harford County district
- In office 1865–1867 Serving with Isaac Cairnes, Thomas Chew Hopkins, Henry A. Silver, Nicholas H. Nelson, Simeon Spicer, Samuel M. Whiteford
- In office 1860–1861 Serving with William F. Bayless and Richard B. McCoy

Personal details
- Born: January 29, 1797 Harford County, Maryland, U.S.
- Died: March 27, 1885 (aged 88) Abingdon, Maryland, U.S.
- Resting place: Mount Carmel Methodist Episcopal Church near Emmorton, Maryland, U.S.
- Spouse: Miss Lee (died)
- Children: 7
- Education: University of Maryland School of Medicine
- Occupation: Politician; physician

Joshua Wilson (January 29, 1797 – March 27, 1885) was an American politician and medical doctor from Maryland. He served as a member of the Maryland House of Delegates, representing Harford County from 1860 to 1861 and 1865 to 1867.

== Early life ==
Joshua Wilson was born on January 29, 1797, in Harford County, Maryland. He graduated from the University of Maryland School of Medicine.

== Career ==
In 1819, Wilson made a ride on horseback with Thomas Chew, Tobias Stansbury and Benjamin Rusk to New Orleans to find a location to practice medicine. He chose to practice medicine in Harford County and would practice for 64 years.

Wilson was elected as county commissioner in 1853 and 1857. Wilson served as a member of the Maryland House of Delegates, representing Harford County from 1860 to 1861. He ran for re-election in the 1861 election, but lost. He served again from 1865 to 1867.

== Personal life ==
Wilson married Miss Lee. His wife predeceased him. Wilson had four sons and three daughters, including William, David J., Ralph L., Henry C., Mrs. B. Peyton Brown and Mrs. E. Hall Richardson.

At a later age, Wilson fell and could no longer walk on one leg. Wilson died on March 27, 1885, at his home in Abingdon. He was buried at Mount Carmel Methodist Episcopal Church near Emmorton.
