= Elisha Lewis =

American politician (died 1867)

Member of the Maryland House of Delegates from the Harford County district
- In office 1862–1862 Serving with Marmaduke Dove and Richard B. McCoy

Personal details
- Born: c. 1792
- Died: January 7, 1867 (aged 75) Harford County, Maryland
- Occupation: Politician

Elisha Lewis (c. 1792 – January 7, 1867) was an American politician from Maryland. He served as a member of the Maryland House of Delegates, representing Harford County in 1862.

== Career ==
Lewis served as a member of the Maryland House of Delegates, representing Harford County in 1862.

Lewis owned warehouses in Baltimore. Three of the warehouses burned down in April 1857.

== Personal life ==
Lewis married. He lived at Bloomsbury estate, south of Havre de Grace.

Lewis died at his home in Harford County on January 7, 1867, at the age of 75.
