= Charles Carroll (barrister) =

American politician (1723-1783)

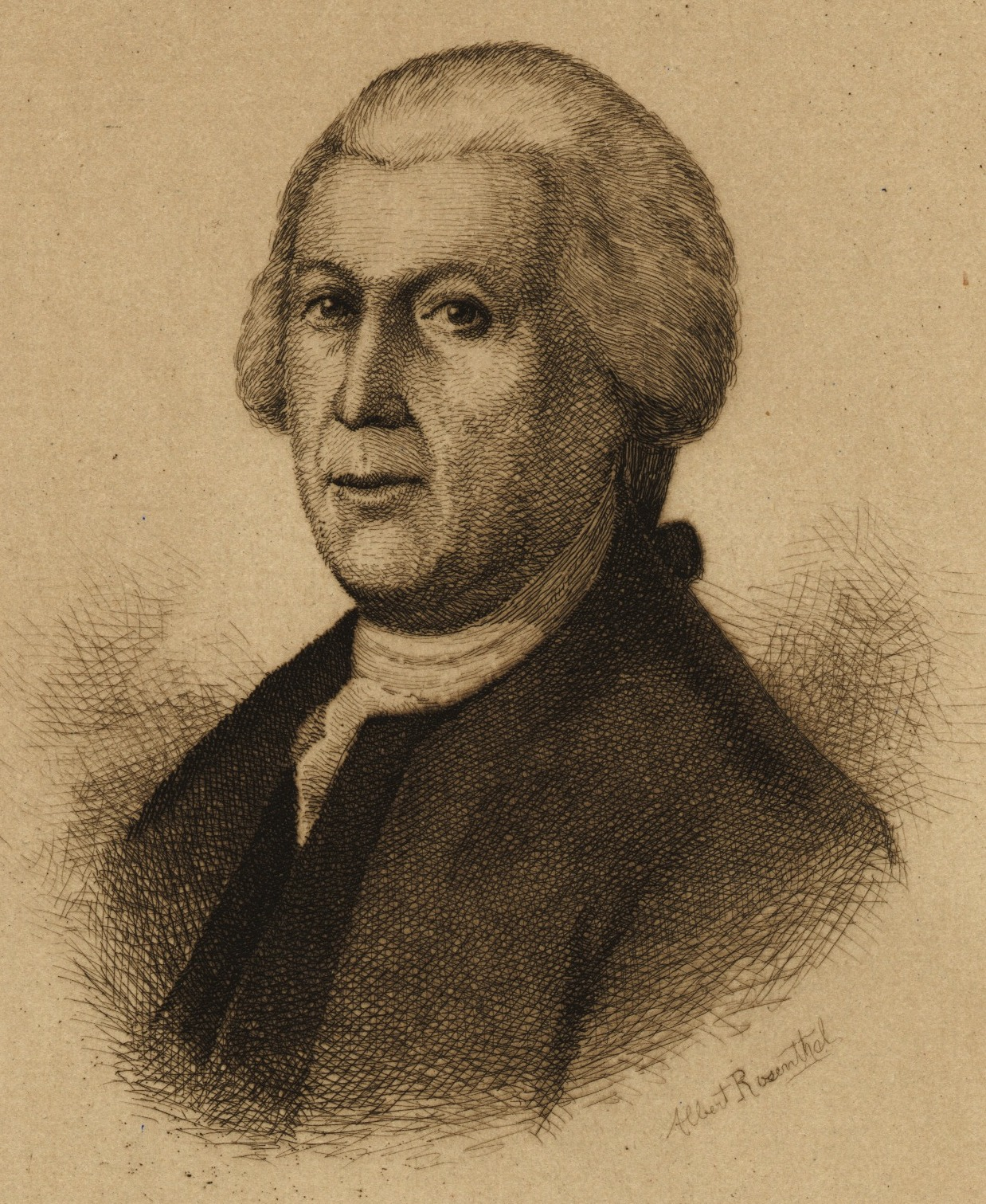
- Born: March 22, 1723; Annapolis
- Died: March 23, 1783; Baltimore County
- Education: Clare College
- Occupation: Politician

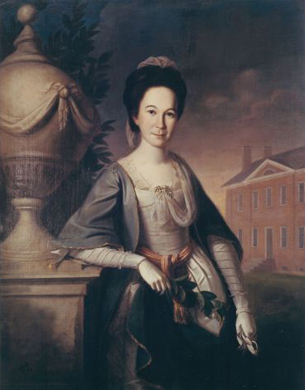
Margaret Tilghman Carroll

Charles Carroll (March 22, 1723 – March 23, 1783) was an American statesman from Annapolis, Maryland. In 1760, he built the colonial home Mount Clare in Maryland, and a he was named a delegate to the Second Continental Congress in 1776 and 1777, which unanimously approved the Declaration of Independence on July 4, 1776.

== Early life and education ==
A descendant of the last Gaelic Lords of Éile in Ireland, Carroll was born on March 22, 1723, in Annapolis, Maryland, to a distinguished Roman Catholic family and was a distant cousin of Charles Carroll of Carrollton, (1737–1832), and Daniel Carroll (the First and Second), (1730–1796). His father, also Charles Carroll, took him to Europe in 1733 for his education. Young Charles spent six years at the English House school in Lisbon, Portugal. He then went to England, where he completed his education at Eton College and the University of Cambridge. After graduating from Cambridge in 1746, Charles returned to Annapolis, where he learned to manage the family's farm and mills at Carrollton.

In 1751, Carroll moved to London, where he lived at Middle Temple and studied law.

== Career ==
Carroll was admitted to the bar at the Inns of Court there before returning to Maryland in early 1755. Since there were now three other relatives named Charles active in public affairs in the area, he began to call himself Charles Carroll, Barrister. However, he never practiced law in the U.S' Three months later, his father died, leaving Charles, at 32, one of the wealthiest men in Maryland. He was elected to his father's seat for Anne Arundel County in the Maryland Assembly, legislature in Annapolis, Maryland for the colonial era Province of Maryland.

In 1760, Carroll completed construction of his summer home estate at Georgia Plantation, southwest of Baltimore along Georgetown Road, also known as the Columbia Road, later named Washington Boulevard, (U.S. Route 1) in present-day Carroll Park north of Gwynns Falls, which flows into the Middle Branch ("Ridgeley's Cove") and Ferry Branch of the Patapsco River. He named the home Mount Clare after his grandmother. In June 1763' he married Margaret Tilghman (1742–1817), daughter of Matthew Tilghman of Talbot County, Maryland. Although the couple had no children who reached maturity, they remained together until his death. She earned a reputation for her greenhouse and pinery, growing oranges, lemons, and pineapple.

=== American Revolution ===
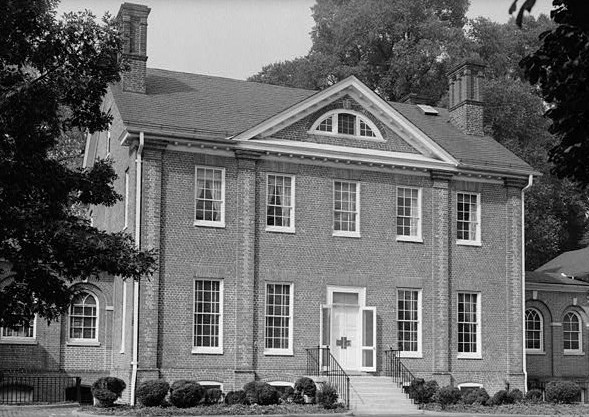
Mount Clare, Carroll's summer residence and estate, which he built in 1760

Carroll continued in the Maryland Assembly until it was discontinued when the American Revolutionary War began in 1775. He then met with other leaders in the Annapolis Convention and had important roles in all their sessions. He joined the Committee of Correspondence in 1774, and the Committee of Safety in 1775. He presided over several sessions of the Convention, which was the early revolutionary government in Maryland.

Carroll was one of the convention committee members who drafted the Declaration and Charter of Rights and form of government for the state of Maryland, which served as Maryland's first new constitution after it was adopted on 3 November 1776. When the convention voted to expel the 23rd proprietary governor and last royal governor, Sir Robert Eden, 1st Baronet, of Maryland, he delivered the message as the chairman of the Convention. Then, in an action typical of his style, he entertained the governor and his wife as house guests at Mount Clare Mansion until they sailed for England.

In November 1776, the Convention sent Carroll as a delegate to the Second Continental Congress in Philadelphia, where he replaced his cousin, Charles Carroll of Carrollton. He served in that Congress until 15 February 1777. He declined the position of Chief Justice in the new revolutionary confederation government. But when he returned, he was elected to the first state Senate in 1777. Later he was re-elected and served in that office until his death, on 23 March 1783, at Mount Clare Mansion. His funeral was held at Old St. Paul's Anglican Church (now Episcopal since 1789) in Baltimore at North Charles and East Saratoga Streets. He was buried there (small cemetery surrounding original church, later moved to block between West Baltimore and Lombard Streets-bounded by new Martin Luther King Boulevard) but later his body was moved to St. Anne's Churchyard (Anglican/Episcopal) off Church Circle in Annapolis.

In the early 1760s, Carroll took the lead and encouraged a group of his business associates to build a fund for a young saddler, Charles Willson Peale, so that he could go to Europe and study painting.

After Carroll's death, his wife Margaret stayed at Mount Clare until her death there on March 14, 1817. The mansion and grounds had many uses and owners during the later 19th century, and now serve as a museum for its architecture, furniture, decorations, and history. It has been operated has a museum since 1917 by the National Society of the Colonial Dames in Maryland, on behalf of the City of Baltimore and its Department of Recreation and Parks, which owns the property. The core of the home is the refurbished main block. The wings, which had been lost over the years, were rebuilt in 1908. A great deal of the family furniture and possessions are preserved there. The home is a fine example of Georgian architecture, and stands on a rise in the center of Carroll Park in southwest Baltimore City, surrounded by the neighborhoods of "Pigtown", (so named for being the site of butcher shops and meat packing plants to process pigs transported from the Midwest on the B&O Railroad); the neighborhood was also known by its more recent "gentrified" name of Washington Village. Mount Clare Museum House is open to the public year-round.

== See also ==
- Carroll family
