= Jacob H. Plowman =

American politician (1836–1897)

Member of the Maryland House of Delegates from the Harford County district
- In office 1884–1888 Serving with R. Harris Archer, J. Martin McNabb, Benjamin Silver Jr.

Personal details
- Born: September 5, 1836 Laurel, Maryland, U.S.
- Died: October 5, 1897 (aged 1836) near Emmorton, Maryland, U.S.
- Resting place: Mount Carmel Church; Emmorton, Maryland, U.S.
- Party: Democratic
- Spouse: Miss Smith
- Children: 1
- Occupation: Politician; farmer; military officer

Jacob H. Plowman (September 5, 1836 – October 5, 1897) was an American politician from Maryland. He served as a member of the Maryland House of Delegates, representing Harford County from 1884 to 1888.

== Early life ==
Jacob H. Plowman was born on September 5, 1836, in Laurel, Maryland.

== Career ==
Plowman learned the trade of a machinist. He worked for the Baltimore and Ohio Railroad. During the Civil War, Plowman served in the Union Army as a quartermaster's clerk. In 1872, Plowman moved to Harford County to pursue farming. He moved to New York City after the war and remained there until 1868. In 1868, he returned to Laurel to work in the machine and iron foundry business.

Plowman was a Democrat. In 1879, Plowman was elected as county commissioner of Harford County. He was remained in that office until 1883. He served as a member of the Maryland House of Delegates, representing Harford County from 1884 to 1888.

In 1887, Plowman was appointed by Governor Elihu Emory Jackson as commander of the Maryland Oyster Navy. He served in that role until 1891.

== Personal life ==
Plowman married Miss Smith from Oella, Maryland. They had one daughter, Ida C. He was a member of the Presbyterian Church, as well as the Masons and Odd Fellows.

Plowman died on October 5, 1897, at his home near Emmorton, Maryland. He was buried at Mount Carmel Church in Emmorton.
