= Henry Walters =

American art collector (1848-1931)

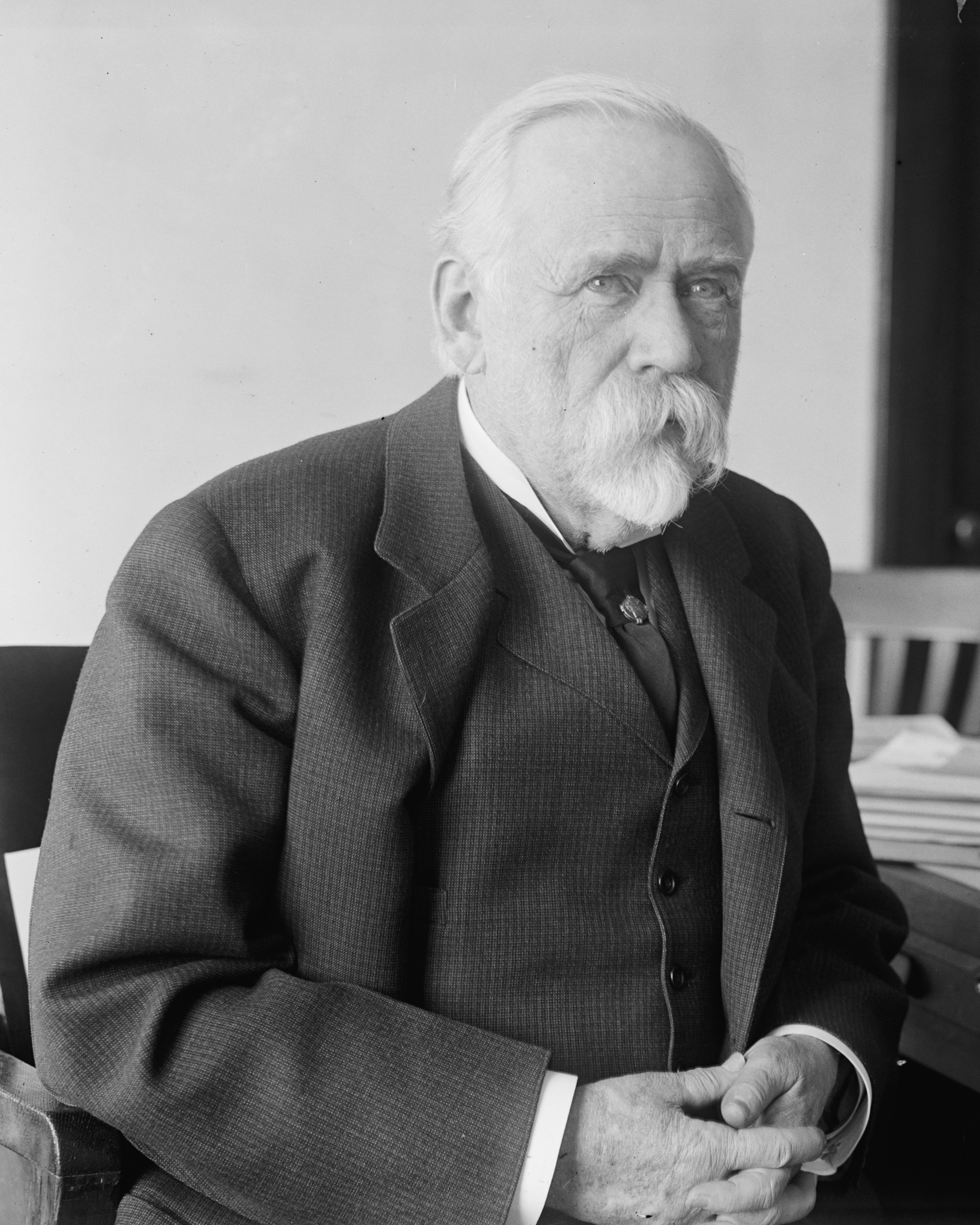
- Born: September 26, 1848
- Died: November 30, 1931 (aged 83); New York City, U.S.
- Resting place: Green Mount Cemetery, Baltimore
- Known for: Art Collector
- Parent(s): William Thompson Walters (1820–1894); Ellen (Harper) Walters

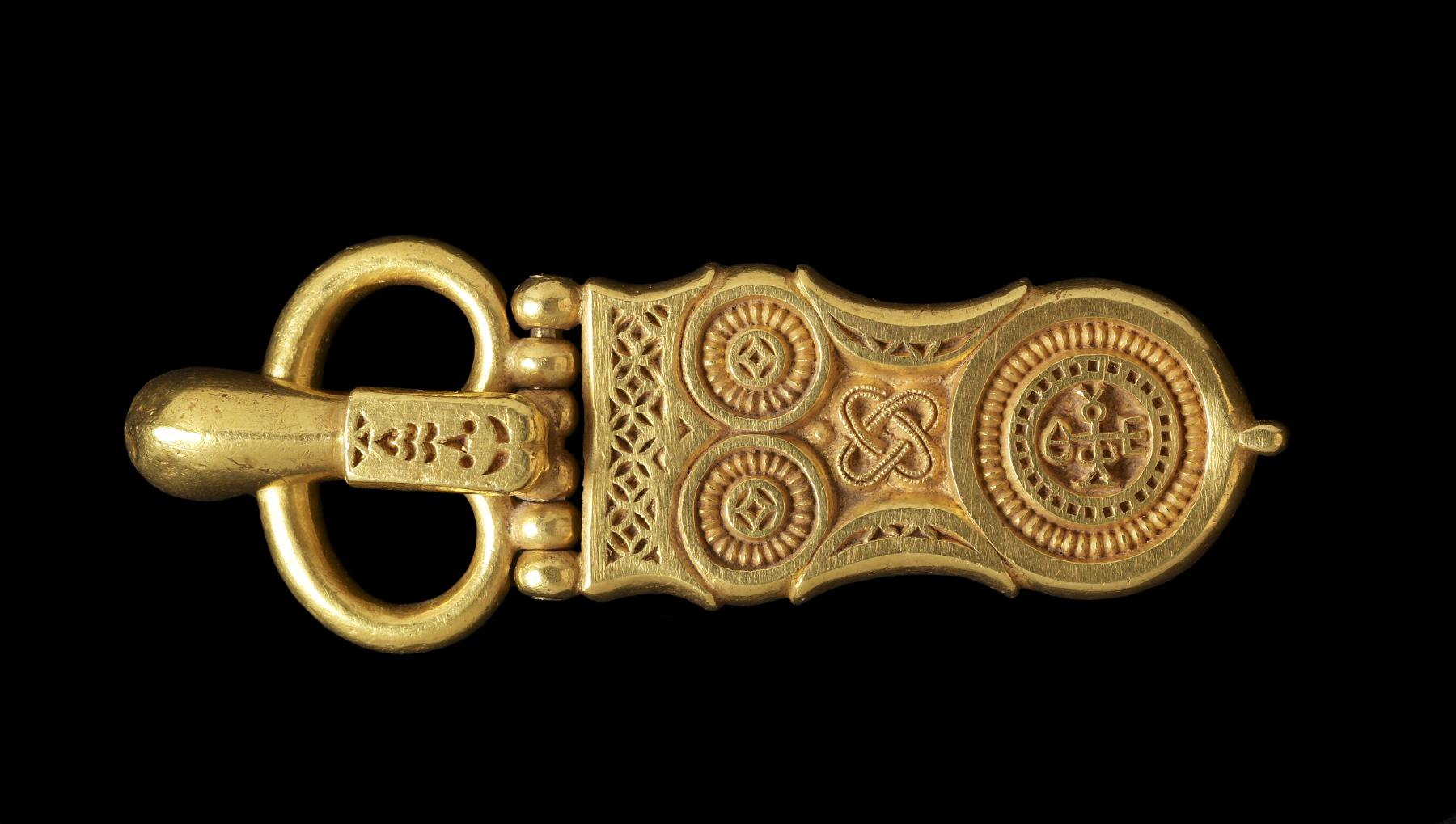
Byzantine Belt Buckle, gold, 6th-7th century. Found near Hama, Syria. Bequeathed to Walters Art Museum by Henry Walters, 1931.

Henry Walters (September 26, 1848 – November 30, 1931) was noted as an art collector and philanthropist, a founder of the Walters Art Gallery (now the Walters Art Museum) in Baltimore, Maryland, which he donated to the city in his 1931 will for the benefit of the public. From the late 19th century, Walters lived most of the time in New York City, where from 1903 on, he served on the executive committee of the Metropolitan Museum of Art. He was selected as second vice president in 1913, a position he held until his death.

Like his father William Thompson Walters, (1820–1894), he was a businessman in the railroad industry, serving as president of the Atlantic Coast Line Railroad (1894–1902), which had been established by his father.

== Early life and education ==
Walters was born in 1848 to William Thompson Walters, (1820–1894), a businessman who later founded the Atlantic Coast Line Railroad. Henry graduated from Georgetown University in Washington, D.C., in 1869. He did graduate work in the Lawrence Scientific School at Harvard University from 1869 to 1872.

== Career ==
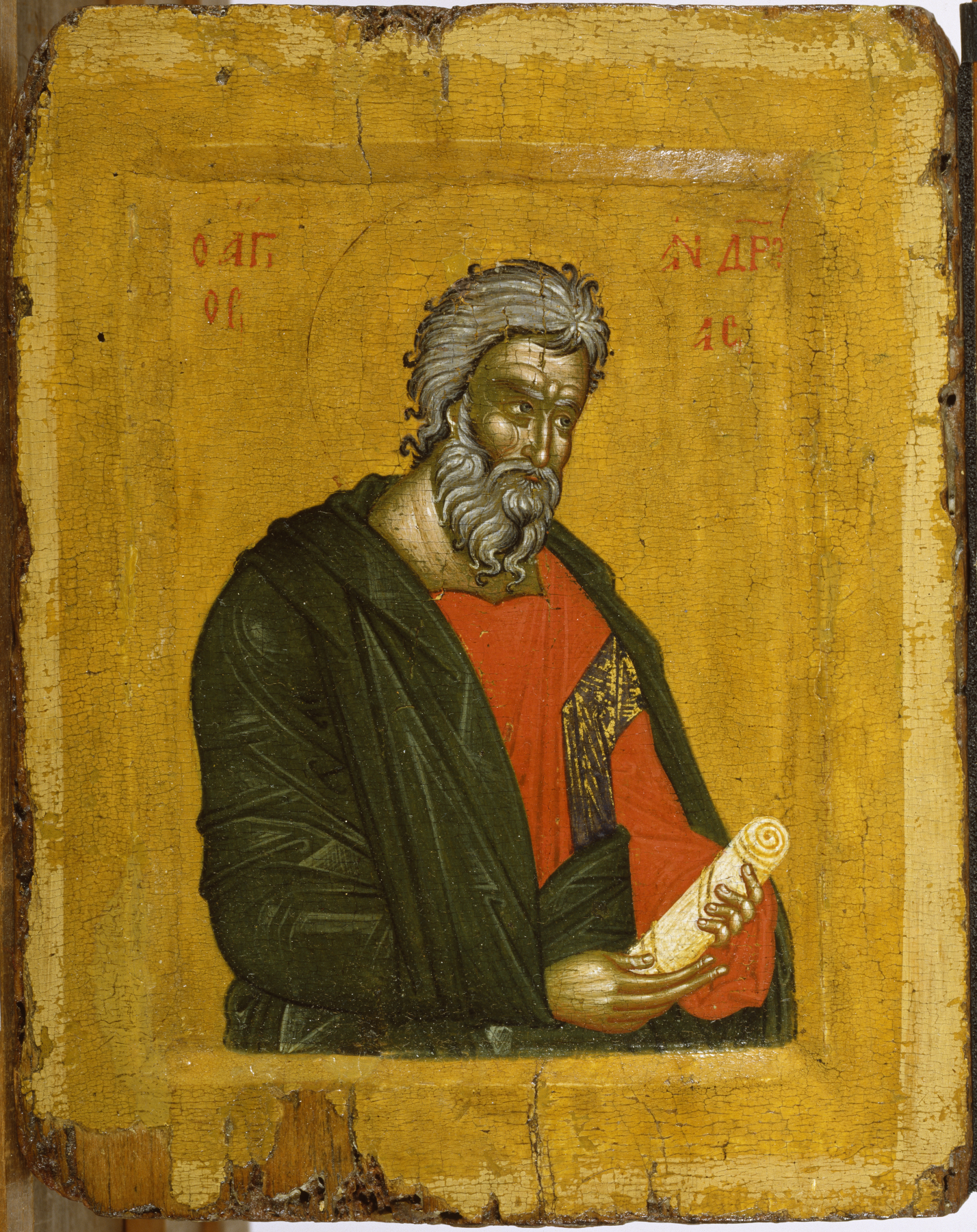
Saint Andrew, Greek icon, 14th century. Purchased by Henry Walters, 1930

In 1889, Walters moved to Wilmington, North Carolina, to serve as general manager of his father's company, the Atlantic Coast Line Railroad. Following his father's death in 1894, Walters was elected president of the company, and he relocated the line's headquarters from North Carolina to New York City. Under his leadership, the railroad experienced rapid growth until World War I. In 1902, Walters also took control of the Louisville and Nashville Railroad.

In New York City, Walters lived with Pembroke and Sarah Jones, two friends he had met in Wilmington, North Carolina. Each of them was interested in art, and their town house was filled with their collections. Walters seldom returned to Baltimore other than to attend board meetings of the Safe Deposit and Trust Company.

Three years after Pembroke Jones' death in 1919, Walters married the widow Sarah Jones in 1922. They continued living in the Manhattan house surrounded by their art collections. Walters died in 1931.

When his father died in 1894, he bequeathed his collection to Henry Walters, who greatly expanded the scope of acquisitions. He purchased the contents of a palace in Rome that contained over 1,700 pieces. In September 1900, Henry bought the three houses adjoining the property owned by his father in the Mount Vernon neighborhood of Baltimore, in order to house and display the full collection. He had the site designed and adapted as a palazzo-style building, which opened to the public in 1909 as the Walters Art Gallery.

Walters also donated four public bath houses to the City of Baltimore. Walters Bath No. 2 was added to the National Register of Historic Places in 1979.

Walters envisaged a museum that would fulfill an educational role within the community, but initially made modest additions to his father's collection. In 1897, his purchase of a 15th-century Koran, originally thought to be Persian, but now regarded as Indian, may have initiated the manuscript collection.

In 1899 he purchased the luxury steam yacht Margarita from Anthony J Drexel (built as SY Semiramis by Ramage & Ferguson of Leith in 1889). He renamed the ship Narada and used it for his world-wide collecting.

In 1900 Walters bought Raphael's Madonna of the Candelabra, which had passed through both the Borghese and Bonaparte family collections. The U.S. Postal Service featured this painting on its 2011 Christmas stamp.

In 1902. he undertook an acquisition on a scale unprecedented in the history of American collecting: he bought the contents of the Palazzo Accoramboni in Rome. The collection abounded in significant works, many of them found to be by masters other than those to whom they had been ascribed, and others by artists not in fashion at that time. In the latter category fell El Greco's painting, St. Francis Receiving the Stigmata. Among the collection's archeological treasures were seven magnificent sarcophagi from a burial chamber associated with the Calpurnii Pisones family. Walters agreed to buy the collection for the sum of five million Italian lire, equivalent at the time to $1.0 million.

He enhanced the breadth of the 19th-century holdings with such early works as Ingres' The Betrothal of Raphael and the Niece of Cardinal Bibbiena, bought in 1903. Although Walters was not fond of French Impressionism, he bought two works in 1903 from American artist Mary Cassatt, including Claude Monet's Springtime.

Walters continued to augment his holdings, buying both in New York and abroad. He collected Egyptian, ancient Near Eastern, and Islamic art, as well as a number of key classical and western medieval objects. These included a pair of limestone heads of Old Testament rulers that came from the abbey church of Saint-Denis.

Beginning in 1903, Walters served on the executive committee of the Metropolitan Museum of Art. In 1913 he became second vice president, a position he retained for the rest of his life. His experiences on a number of museum committees may have resulted in a change of direction in his collecting after World War I. He shifted from acquiring works representative of various fields and more committed to objects of major historical and artistic significance.

== Death ==
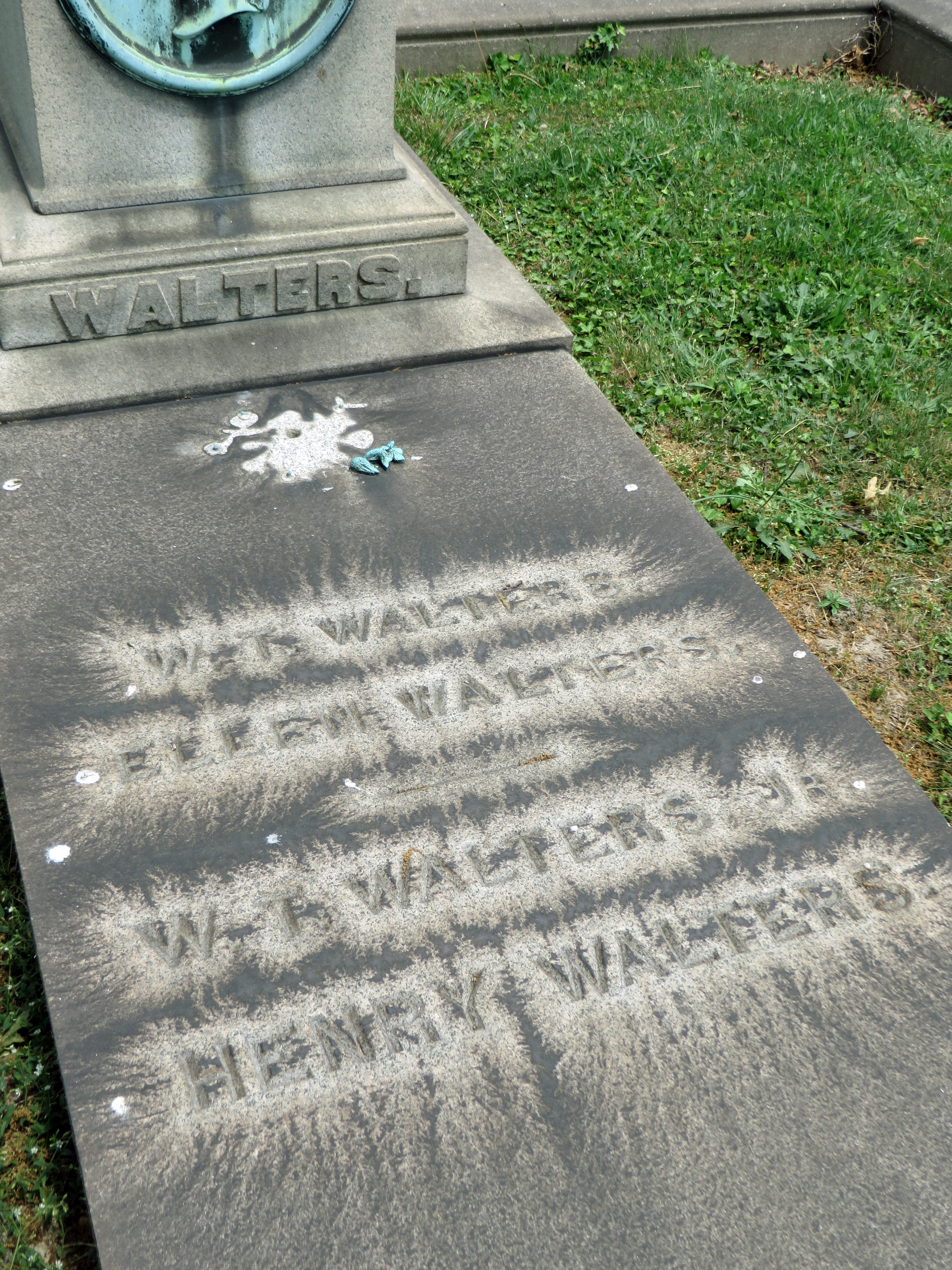
Walters' gravestone detail

Walters died in 1931, leaving his museum building and its contents to the mayor and city council of Baltimore "for the benefit of the public." The Walters Art Museum opened its doors for the first time as a public institution on November 3, 1934. He was buried in Green Mount Cemetery.
