= Marmaduke Dove =

American politician (died 1866)

Member of the Maryland House of Delegates from the Harford County district
- In office 1861–1862 Serving with Elisha Lewis and Richard B. McCoy

Personal details
- Born: Marmaduke P. Dove
- Died: September 2, 1866 (aged 44) Joppa, Maryland, U.S.
- Occupation: Politician

Marmaduke P. Dove (died September 2, 1866) was an American politician from Maryland. He served as a member of the Maryland House of Delegates, representing Harford County from 1861 to 1862.

== Career ==
Marmaduke P. Dove served as a member of the Maryland House of Delegates, representing Harford County from 1861 to 1862.

== Personal life ==
Dove died on September 2, 1866, aged 44, at a farm in Joppa.
