= John S. Brown (Maryland politician) =

American politician (died 1878)

Member of the Maryland House of Delegates from the Harford County district
- In office 1868–1868 Serving with Nicholas H. Nelson, Benjamin Silver, Robert R. Vandiver

Personal details
- Born: c. 1810
- Died: March 21, 1878 (aged 68)
- Resting place: Green Mount Cemetery
- Party: Democratic
- Spouse: Elizabeth A. Coleman (m. 1842; died 1870)
- Children: 3
- Occupation: Politician; shipbuilder; librarian

John S. Brown (c. 1810 – March 21, 1878) was an American politician from Maryland. He served as a member of the Maryland House of Delegates, representing Harford County in 1868. He later served as city librarian in Baltimore.

== Early life ==
John S. Brown was born c. 1810 in England. He moved to the United States at a young age and lived in Washington, D.C., until the age of 16.

== Career ==
Brown was a Democrat. He served as a member of the Maryland House of Delegates, representing Harford County in 1868.

Brown was an apprentice in shipbuilding under Mr. Robb. He became a shipbuilder and owned a shipyard in Baltimore for a time. In 1868, Brown was elected as board supervising inspector of steamboats in Baltimore. He was president of the first branch of the Baltimore city council and was mayor ex-officio for a period. Around 1875, he became city librarian of Baltimore and served in that role until his death.

== Personal life ==
Brown married Elizabeth A. Coleman in 1842. She died in 1870. They had at least one son and one daughter, Elizabeth. He later re-married and had another child.

Brown died of pneumonia at his home on East Chase Street in Baltimore on March 21, 1878, aged 68. He was buried in Green Mount Cemetery.
