= Mount Clare Shops =

National Historic Landmark

Coordinates: 39.285457°N 76.633437°W

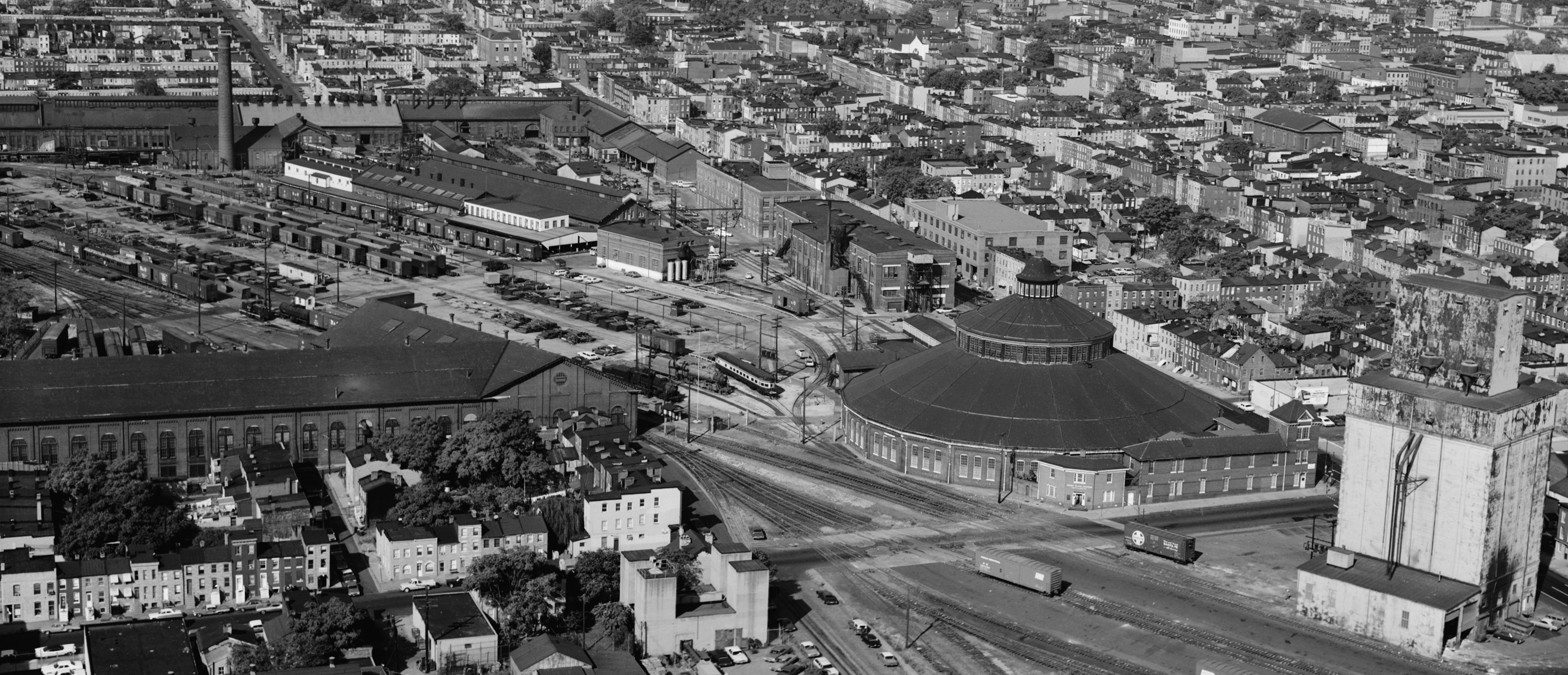
Mount Clare Shops in 1971. The circular Passenger Car Shop (1884) and Mt. Clare Depot (1851) are located in center right. Left: Passenger Car Shop and Paint Shop (1870). Buildings demolished after 1971: Lower right: Grain Elevator (1910). Top left to top center: Blacksmith Shop (1866), Brass Foundry and Iron Foundry (1864).

The Mount Clare Shops is the oldest railroad manufacturing complex in the United States, located in Baltimore, Maryland. It was founded by the Baltimore and Ohio Railroad (B&O) in 1829. Mt. Clare was the site of many inventions and innovations in railroad technology. It is now the site of the National Museum of Railroad History & Innovation (formerly B&O Railroad Museum). The museum and Mt. Clare station were designated a National Historic Landmark in 1961.

== History ==
The Mount Clare site was a portion of an estate owned by Charles Carroll (barrister), a distant cousin of Charles Carroll of Carrollton. (See Mount Clare (Maryland).) The initial operations of the B&O used horsecars, and the earliest facilities on the Mt. Clare site included a depot and stables for horses. This was one of the earliest passenger stations in the United States.

Following the 1830 manufacture of the first U.S. steam locomotive by Peter Cooper at the nearby Canton Iron Works, the B&O began building locomotives at Mt. Clare, as well as freight cars, passenger cars, bridges and other railroad equipment. Ross Winans and Phineas Davis, pioneers in locomotive design, built their inventions at Mt. Clare. The shops employed 100 workers in 1839.

The B&O built an ironworks at Mt. Clare in 1850. The first iron railroad bridges, designed by Wendel Bollman, were built in the Mt. Clare shops in the 1850s. A roundhouse, engine service and car shops, and a new depot were also built at Mt. Clare during this period.

After the Civil War, the railroad built a foundry, blacksmith shop, additional car shops and an office building at Mt. Clare. In 1882, the railroad added a bridge fabrication shop. A circular (actually 22-sided) passenger car shop, sometimes mislabeled as a roundhouse, was designed by architect E. Francis Baldwin and completed in 1884. At the time of completion it was the largest circular industrial building in the world, 235 ft (72 m) in diameter and 123 ft (37 m) high.

Mt. Clare shops employed 1,000 workers by 1852 and over 3,000 in the 1920s.

Between 1900 and 1920, the B&O erected a large locomotive shop, sawmill, machine shop, a grain elevator and a tender shop. Air-conditioned passenger cars were developed by the B&O and the Carrier Corporation at Mt. Clare in the late 1920s.

The railroad built its last steam locomotive at Mt. Clare in 1948. During the 1950s, as the railroad increased its use of diesel locomotives, there was less demand for steam locomotive and machine shop work at Mt. Clare. The railroad abandoned use of the circular car shop in 1953 and made it available for use by the museum.

In 1962, a fire destroyed the Mt. Clare locomotive erecting shop. The Chesapeake and Ohio Railway (C&O) purchased the B&O, also in 1962, and subsequently locomotive repairs were handled at the B&O shops in Cumberland, Maryland. Only car repairs were continued at Mt. Clare, until 1974, when all shop work on the site was discontinued. By this time many of the buildings were in disrepair, and most were demolished by 1976, except for those used by the museum. CSX Transportation, the successor railroad company, sold portions of the property, and 40 acres (160,000 m^{2}) of the Mt. Clare site have been retained by the museum.

== See also ==
- List of locomotive builders
- Baltimore and Ohio Railroad Martinsburg Shops
