= Nicholas H. Nelson =

American politician (died 1874)

Member of the Maryland House of Delegates from the Harford County district
- In office 1867–1868 Serving with Simeon Spicer, Samuel M. Whiteford, Joshua Wilson, John S. Brown, Benjamin Silver, Robert R. Vandiver

Personal details
- Died: December 28, 1874 (aged 62) Federal Hill, Baltimore, Maryland, U.S.
- Resting place: Bethel Church Cemetery
- Party: Democratic
- Occupation: Politician

Nicholas H. Nelson (died December 28, 1874) was an American politician from Maryland. He served as a member of the Maryland House of Delegates, representing Harford County from 1867 to 1868.

== Career ==
Nelson was a Democrat. He served as a member of the Maryland House of Delegates, representing Harford County from 1867 to 1868. He was a member of the Harford County Democratic Executive Committee in 1873. He was still a member at the time of his death.

Nelson served on the board of directors of the Mutual Fire Insurance Company of Harford County.

== Personal life ==
Nelson married Elizabeth B. His wife died in 1873. Nelson had at least one son, Thomas H.

Nelson died on December 28, 1874, at the age of 62, at his home near Federal Hill, Baltimore. He was buried at Bethel Church Cemetery.
