= Samuel M. Whiteford =

American politician (1809–1889)

Member of the Maryland House of Delegates from the Harford County district
- In office 1867–1867 Serving with Nicholas H. Nelson, Simeon Spicer, Joshua Wilson

Personal details
- Born: May 1809
- Died: March 2, 1889 (aged 79) near Pylesville, Maryland, U.S.
- Resting place: Slate Presbyterian Church Cemetery
- Party: Whig; Democratic
- Spouse(s): Miss Ramsay; Sarah Jean Heaps
- Children: 10
- Relatives: William M. Whiteford (grandson)
- Occupation: Politician

Samuel M. Whiteford (May 1809 – March 2, 1889) was an American politician from Maryland. He served as a member of the Maryland House of Delegates, representing Harford County in 1867.

== Early life ==
Samuel M. Whiteford was born in May 1809.

== Career ==
In 1850, Whiteford was elected as a Whig as county commissioner of Harford County.

After the war, Whiteford became a Democrat. He served as a member of the Maryland House of Delegates, representing Harford County in 1867. He then served as register of voters for twelve years.

Whiteford was a slave owner.

== Personal life ==
Whiteford married Miss Ramsay, daughter of Colonel James Ramsay. They had seven children, William E., James R, Henry Clay, Samuel J., Mrs. William H. Wilson, Rebecca and Sallie A. His daughter Sallie married Robert S. Parke. Whiteford married Sarah Jean Heaps, daughter of John Heaps. They had three sons, including Robert Morgan, Nelson and Elmer C. His grandson was William M. Whiteford, son of James R. Whiteford.

Whiteford was a member of the Slate Presbyterian Church. Whiteford died on March 2 (or 3), 1889, at his home near Pylesville. He was buried at Slate Presbyterian Church Cemetery.
