= R. Harris Archer =

American politician (died 1922)

Member of the Maryland House of Delegates from the Harford County district
- In office 1884–1888 Serving with J. Martin McNabb, Jacob H. Plowman, Benjamin Silver Jr.

Personal details
- Born: Robert Harris Archer
- Died: February 28, 1922 (aged 77) Bel Air, Maryland, U.S.
- Resting place: Churchville Presbyterian Church; Churchville, Maryland, U.S.
- Party: Democratic
- Spouse(s): Elizabeth Lee; Cassandra Lee
- Parent: Thomas Archer (father)
- Relatives: George Archer (brother)
- Occupation: Politician; farmer

Robert Harris Archer (died February 28, 1922) was an American politician from Maryland. He served as a member of the Maryland House of Delegates from 1884 to 1888.

== Early life ==
Robert Harris Archer was born to Thomas Archer and grew up in Churchville, Maryland.

== Career ==
Archer worked in the coal and lumber business in Lapidum, Maryland. He later worked as a farmer in Priestford.

Archer was a Democrat. He served as a member of the Maryland House of Delegates from 1884 to 1888. Archer was general assessor in 1896. He was appointed by Judge VanBibber in 1907 as court crier. He served in that role until his death.

== Personal life ==
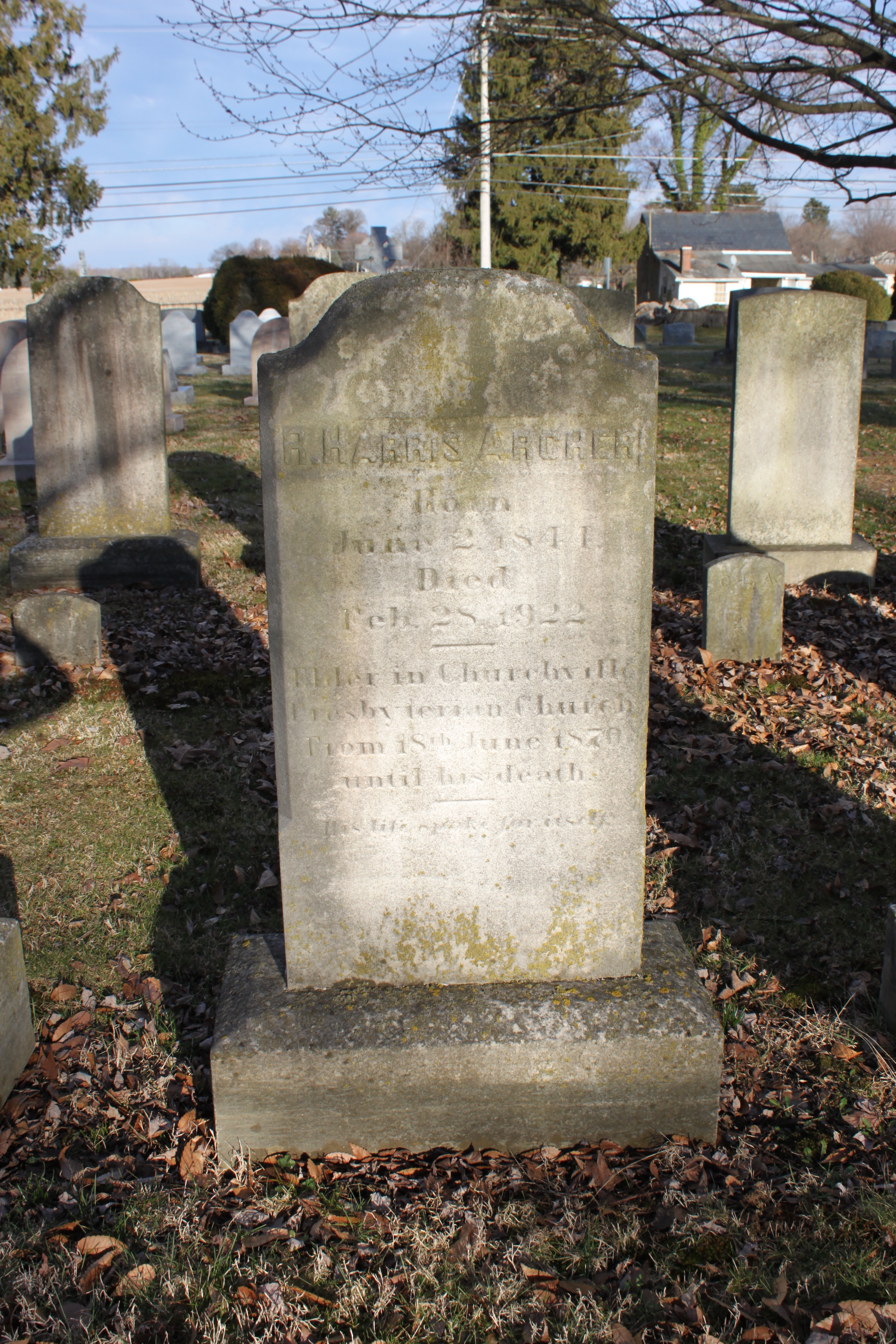
Grave of Archer in Churchville Presbyterian Church cemetery

Archer married Elizabeth Lee. They had at least two children, Mrs. S. C. Wasson and Glasgow Archer. Archer married Cassandra Lee. They had one son, Robert H. Jr. His son Robert H. would serve as assistant attorney general of Maryland and as a leader of the Democratic Party in Maryland. His brother was architect George Archer.

As of 1901, Archer lived at a church in Priestford. He was a member of Churchville Presbyterian Church.

Archer died on February 28, 1922, at the age of 77, at the home of his son in Bel Air, Maryland. He was buried at Churchville Presbyterian Church cemetery.
