= J. Martin McNabb =

American politician (1847–1926)

Member of the Maryland House of Delegates from the Harford County district
- In office 1884–1888 Serving with R. Harris Archer, Jacob H. Plowman, Benjamin Silver Jr.

Personal details
- Born: Joseph Martin McNabb; October 18, 1847 Macton, Harford County, Maryland, U.S.
- Died: April 2, 1926 (aged 78) Cardiff, Maryland, U.S.
- Resting place: Darlington Cemetery; Darlington, Maryland, U.S.
- Party: Democratic
- Spouse: Sarah Ellen Savin (m. 1875; died 1924)
- Children: Charles H.
- Occupation: Politician; educator; lawyer

Joseph Martin McNabb (October 18, 1847 – April 2, 1926) was an American politician from Maryland. He served in the Maryland House of Delegates, representing Harford County, from 1884 to 1888.

== Early life ==
Joseph Martin McNabb was born on October 18, 1847, at the family homestead in Macton, Harford County, Maryland, to Nancy (née Martin) and David G. McNabb. His father was a wheelwright and farmer. McNabb was educated at Harford Central Academy.

== Career ==
McNabb was a director of Harford Bank. He worked as a teacher in Maryland schools in the 1870s. McNabb read law and was admitted to the bar in 1874. He ran a law practice in Bel Air and Macton. He stopped practicing law in 1925.

McNabb was a Democrat. McNabb ran for county surveyor in 1873 and served in that role for some years. He was elected as a member of the Maryland House of Delegates, representing Harford County, from 1884 to 1888.

== Personal life ==
McNabb married Sarah Ellen Savin, daughter of Patrick C. Savin, on January 20, 1875. They had one son, Charles H. McNabb. His wife died in 1924. He was affiliated with the Methodist Episcopal Church.

McNabb died on April 2, 1926, at his home in Cardiff, Maryland. He was buried at Darlington Cemetery.
