= Thomas Archer (American politician) =

American politician (died 1870)

Member of the Maryland House of Delegates from the Harford County district
- In office 1864–1864 Serving with Charles B. Hitchcock and Richard B. McCoy

Personal details
- Born: c. 1808
- Died: February 17, 1870 (aged 62) near Churchville, Maryland, U.S.
- Party: Unconditional Union; Republican
- Children: R. Harris and George
- Occupation: Politician

Thomas Archer (c. 1808 – February 17, 1870) was an American politician from Maryland. He served as a member of the Maryland House of Delegates, representing Harford County in 1864.

== Career ==
Archer served as a member of the Maryland House of Delegates, representing Harford County in 1864. He was elected on an Unconditional Union Party ticket. Archer ran as a Republican in 1865 for the Maryland Senate, but lost.

== Personal life ==
Archer had children, including R. Harris, George and J. Glasgow. R. Harris Archer also served as a state delegate. His son George was an architect and his son J. Glasgow worked as a pastor in a Presbyterian Church in western Pennsylvania.

Archer died on February 17, 1870, at the age of 62, at his home near Churchville, Maryland.
