= Madonna of the Candelabra =

Painting by Raphael

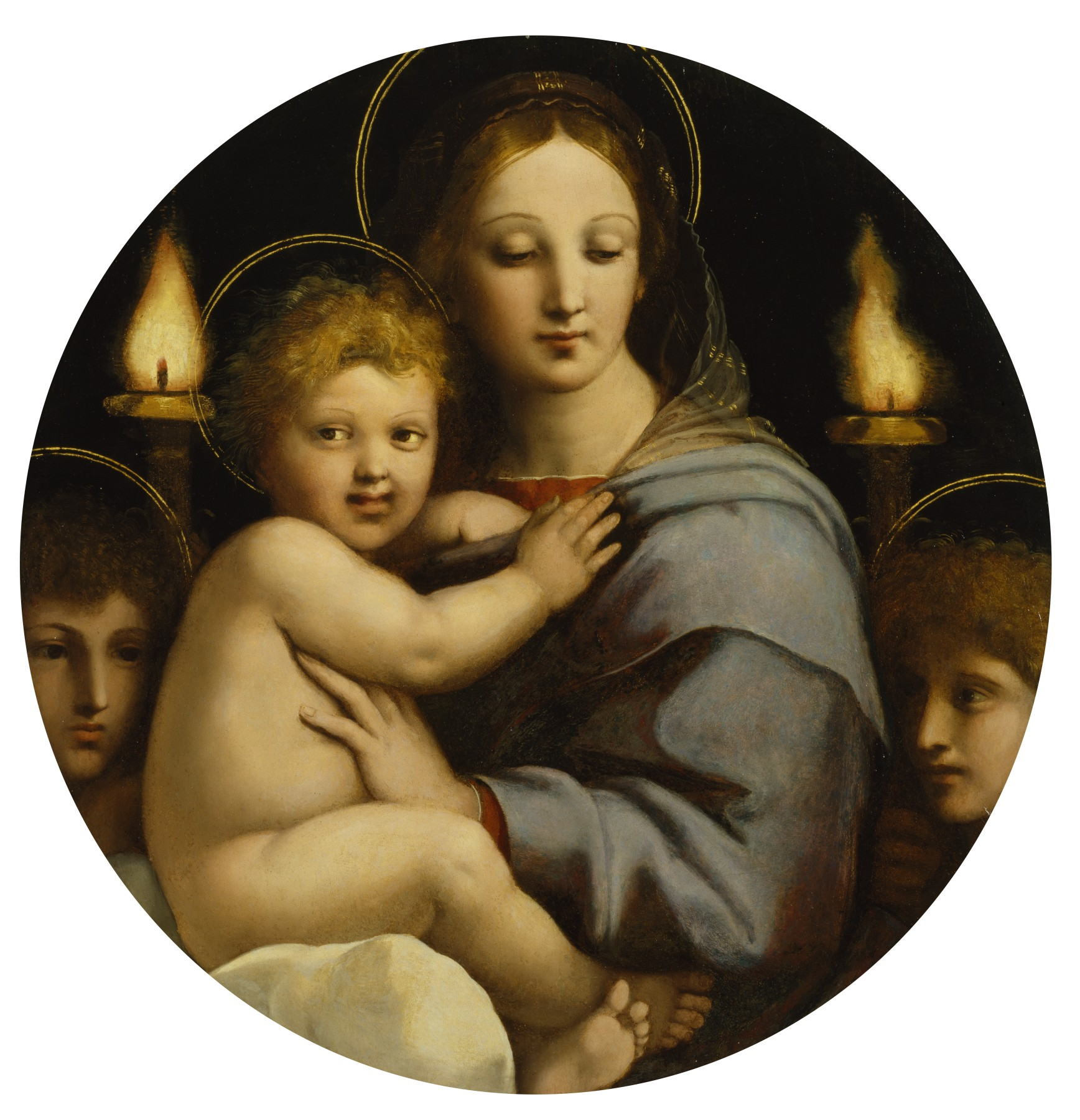
- Artist: Raphael
- Year: c. 1513-1514
- Medium: Oil on panel
- Dimensions: 65.7 cm × 64 cm (25.9 in × 25 in)
- Location: Walters Art Museum, Baltimore, Maryland

The Madonna of the Candelabra is a Madonna painting by the Italian Renaissance artist Raphael, dating to about 1513-1514 and is in the collection of the Walters Art Museum in Baltimore.

Painted during his Roman period, this tondo Madonna of the Virgin and Child employs a rare motif of flanking candelabra that was derived from representations of ancient Roman emperors. Through this reference to the rulers of antiquity, Raphael alludes to Christ's and Mary's roles as the king and queen of Heaven. Raphael was famed for his graceful style. which combined the study of classical sculpture and nature. The chiaroscuro effects (modeling in light and shade) and gentle coloring give the figures a soft, delicate appearance. The painting relies heavily on the participation of Raphael's workshop, and the two angels certainly were done by his assistants. This was the first Madonna painted by Raphael to enter a North American collection. It was purchased by Henry Walters in 1901.

The central portion of the painting was issued as the traditional holiday first class Christmas stamp for 2011 by the United States Postal Service. The stamp was released on October 13, 2011, in New York, New York.

== See also ==
- Madonna (art)
- List of paintings by Raphael
- Italian Renaissance
