= Richard B. McCoy =

American politician (died 1902)

Member of the Maryland House of Delegates from the Harford County district
- In office 1860–1864 Serving with William F. Bayless, Joshua Wilson, Marmaduke Dove, Elisha Lewis, Thomas Archer, Charles B. Hitchcock

Personal details
- Born: c. 1821 Baltimore, Maryland, U.S.
- Died: October 18, 1902 (aged 81) Dublin, Maryland, U.S.
- Party: Know Nothing
- Children: 7
- Occupation: Politician

Richard B. McCoy (c. 1821 – October 18, 1902) was an American politician from Maryland. He served as a member of the Maryland House of Delegates, representing Harford County from 1860 to 1864.

== Early life ==
Richard B. McCoy was born in Baltimore.

== Career ==
McCoy served as a member of the Maryland House of Delegates, representing Harford County from 1860 to 1864. He was elected on the Know Nothing ticket.

McCoy was one of the original incorporators and served as a director of the Conowingo Bridge Company.

== Personal life ==
McCoy had four daughters and three sons, Jennie, Priscilla, Helen, Nannie, David G., John G. and Richard B. Jr. He was a Quaker and abolitionist.

McCoy died October 18, 1902, at the age of 81, at the home of his brother in Dublin, Maryland.
