= Mount Clare (Maryland) =

Historic house in Maryland, United States

- U.S. National Register of Historic Places
- U.S. National Historic Landmark
- Baltimore City Landmark
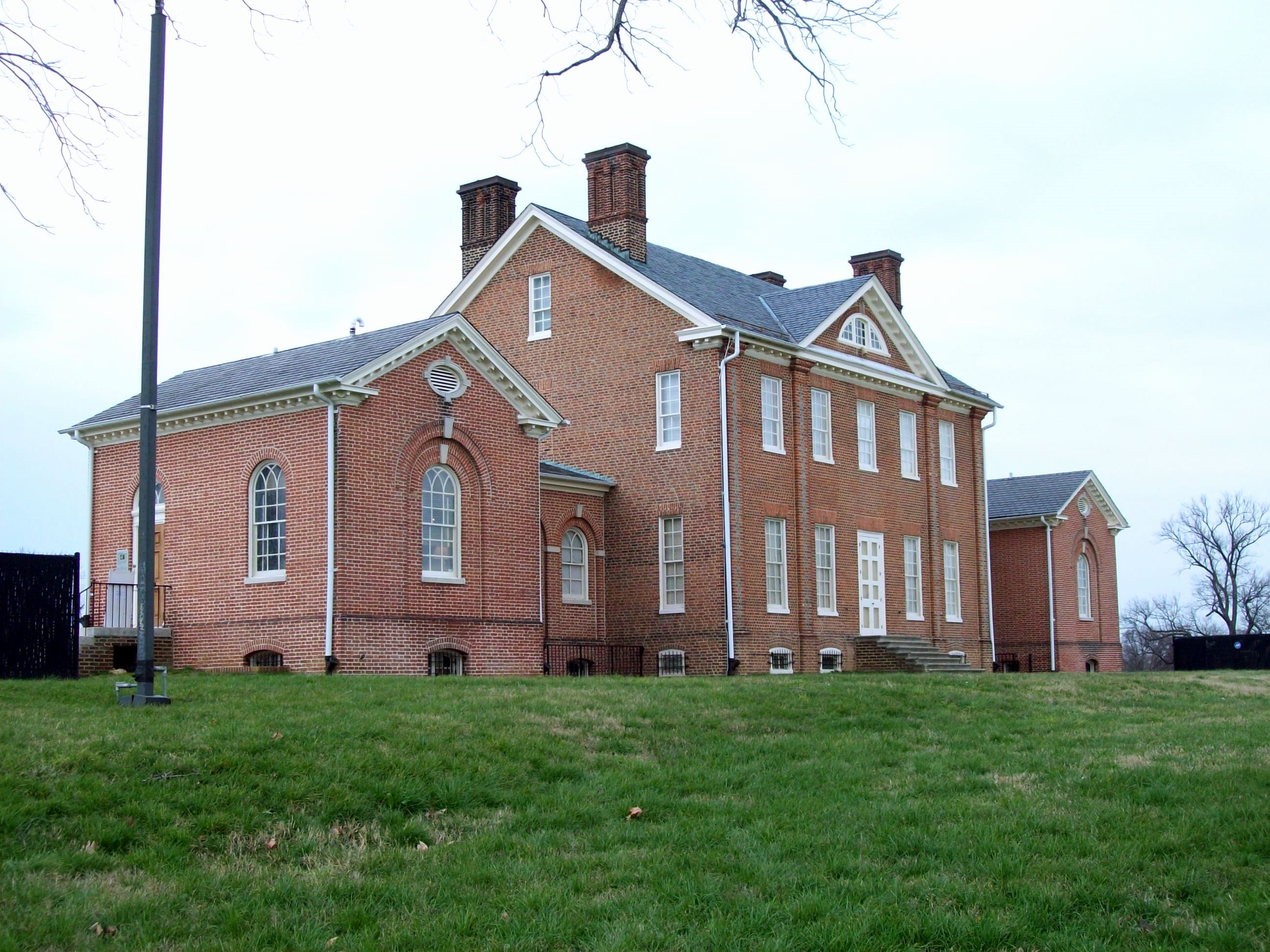
- Mount Clare in December 2011
- Interactive map of Mount Clare
- Location: Carroll Park, Baltimore, Maryland, U.S.
- Coordinates: 39°16′44″N 76°38′37″W
- Area: 0 acres (0 ha)
- Built: 1763
- Architectural style: Georgian
- NRHP reference No.: 70000860

Significant dates
- Added to NRHP: April 15, 1970
- Designated NHL: April 15, 1970
- Designated BCL: 1982

Mount Clare, also known as Mount Clare Mansion and generally known today as the Mount Clare Museum House, is the oldest Colonial-era structure in Baltimore, Maryland, U.S. The Georgian style of architecture plantation house exhibits a somewhat altered five-part plan.

The structure was built in 1763 on a Carroll family plantation by barrister Charles Carroll the Barrister, (1723–1783), a descendant of the last Gaelic Lords of Éile in Ireland and a distant relative of the much better-known Charles Carroll of Carrollton, (1737–1832), longest living signer of the Declaration of Independence and the richest man in America in his later years, also the layer of the First Stone of the new Baltimore and Ohio Railroad, just a short distance away in 1828.

The City of Baltimore purchased a large portion of the former estate in 1890 as its third large landscaped park. Mount Clare has been maintained by the National Society of Colonial Dames in Maryland, the local chapter of The National Society of The Colonial Dames of America, since 1917. In 1970, it was added to the National Register of Historic Places and was designated a National Historic Landmark for its architecture.

== Description ==
Mount Clare is a 2 1/2-story Georgian style plantation house, regarded as the oldest Colonial-era structure surviving in Baltimore, Maryland. It exhibits a somewhat altered five-part plan typical of mid-18th-century Virginia and Maryland plantation architecture.

The central block features a portico on the front façade with a projecting bay above. The upper bay contains a prominent Palladian window, added by Charles Carroll the Barrister in 1768, which dominates the entry facade. The house was completed around 1767 after a construction process spanning several years, incorporating an earlier building by Charles Carroll's brother John.

The original flanking wings included a kitchen wing, a wash house, and an orangery. After Carroll's death in 1783, his widow enlarged the complex considerably, connecting the outbuildings and adding a greenhouse to the orangery, resulting in a structure approximately 360 feet long. These later additions were executed in the Federal style, which was more fashionable at the time and differs subtly from the original Georgian central block.

The City of Baltimore constructed Palladian pavilions connected by hyphens on either side in 1910, originally designed as concealed public toilet facilities. These structures do not reflect the historical outbuildings that were originally on the estate. They have since been converted to serve as a library and a colonial-era kitchen exhibit. A stable dating to circa 1912, which once housed the horses of the city's park rangers, has been restored and now serves as a classroom space and rental facility for events and meetings.

The mansion has been appointed with period furnishings and decorative arts reflective of 18th-century colonial life. It is open to the public and administered by the National Society of Colonial Dames in Maryland, which has maintained the property since 1917.

== History ==
=== 18th century ===
The first building on the Mount Clare property was built by John Henry Carroll, Charles Carroll's brother, (1723–1783), in 1754, and was probably eventually incorporated into the larger house. Charles inherited the property after John's death. The property consisted of 800 acres from the much larger Georgia Plantation, which had belonged to their father, Dr. Charles Carroll. Mount Clare overlooked the northwestern shore of Ridgely's Cove of the Middle Branch and Ferry Branch of the Patapsco River, where some wharves and docks existed along with the Baltimore Iron Works, one of the largest industrial enterprises of colonial America. Charles began construction of the house between 1757 and 1760.

This area had originally been near the first selected site by the appointed town commissioners for the new Baltimore Town, laid out in 1729. A different location, further northeast on the Basin, head of the Northwest Branch of the Patapsco River, was chosen after the landowner John Moale objected to the project on the theory that he had located important iron ore deposits there that he intended to eventually mine and exploit. One hundred and twenty years earlier, during the first explorations and mapping by the famed Captain John Smith, (1580–1631), of the northern Chesapeake Bay, on his 1608 map he had labeled what is now called the Patapsco River as Bolus River, from the Latin word meaning clay, usually holding iron mineral deposits.

Charles Carroll the Barrister, (1723-1783), began building the present 2 1/2-story Georgian style central block, incorporating his brother John's kitchen and flanking it with a wash house and an orangery. In 1768, Charles added the projecting bay and Palladian window that dominate the entry facade today. The kitchen wing was enlarged and an office wing was added for balance, resulting in a symmetrical nine-part elevation. The house was completed about 1767.

After Barrister Charles' death in 1783, his widow made further changes, connecting the outbuildings and adding a greenhouse to the orangery and expanding the laundry, resulting in a complex about 360 feet long. These additions, along with other alterations, were in the more current style of Federal architecture which is similar to but slightly different from the older Georgian.

=== 19th century ===
By the 1820s, nearby to the east as the street grid of the city began growing and inching closer towards the southwest with its rows and lines of streets and alleys filled with the dense development of small brick rowhouses of various styles. Under the competitive economic pressure to the City and the Port of Baltimore of the 1825 massive construction project with the opening of the northern Erie Canal, with its quicker and cheaper access from the Great Lakes to New York City and the proposed Chesapeake and Ohio Canal along the Potomac River to the south from Georgetown and Washington, D.C. to the western Appalachian Mountains and Cumberland, Maryland caused a long reaction among leading citizens and leaders of the city. The forming by several businessmen and industrialists, after hearing details of the incredible new transportation technology now being used in Great Britain from several of its leading merchants, the Baltimore and Ohio Railroad Company, was formed in 1827 which included Charles Carroll of Carrollton, (1737–1832), as one of its directors and the important ceremonial position of setting the First Stone for the railroad at the end of the big parade, festivities and ceremonies on Independence Day, July 4, 1828, near the old house.

The foundries, shops, forges and other equipment sheds and shacks would be known as the Mount Clare Shops off East Pratt Street near future Arlington Street, where a small Mount Clare Station was erected in the early 1830s as one of its first passenger terminals and joined by its landmark B. & O. Roundhouse in 1884, which after 1953 became the site of the Railroad Company's new B. & O. Transportation Museum, later reorganized independently as the B&O Railroad Museum, and the main temporary one at the southeast corner of West Pratt and South Charles Streets, near the Basin's waterfront piers. The Mount Clare name was applied to the nearby growing neighborhood in the early 19th century, home to an increasing complex of foundries, shops, mechanics, industries and businesses supplying equipment, workmen, contractors and businesses, all revolving around the business of the railroad. Attracted to the growing industrial capabilities of the area were industrialists, inventors, manufacturers such as Peter Cooper (1791–1883) of New York, who designed the first steam engine locomotives for the railroad when it quickly shifted from the horse-drawn power used during its first four years. Ross Winans (1796–1877) further developed locomotives and other equipment, followed by his sons Thomas and William Winans, with his Russian contracts and work. Hundreds of workers with specialized industrial skills, both citizens and recent immigrants, worked in southwest Baltimore and lived in the surrounding streets and communities. Other nearby neighborhoods were Poppleton, Union Square, and East Baltimore, along with the earlier Pigtown, also known by the gentrified 1980's as Washington Village.

The mansion left the Carroll Family's ownership in 1840, and the house's flanking hyphen wings were demolished. During the American Civil War, when Baltimore was occupied in May 1861 by northern state militia and then regular army forces, Mount Clare was used as a headquarters by Union Army forces who fortified the site and named it Camp Carroll, one of a series of earthen forts surrounding Baltimore, then making it the second most-fortified city in the world at that time, after Washington, D.C.

Beginning in 1871, land was leased to the Schuetzen Park for use by the German community in Baltimore. The house and adjacent acreage 70 acres (28 ha) facing Washington Boulevard and the Gwynns Falls and Middle Branch of the river were purchased in 1890 by the City of Baltimore and became its third large landscaped park.

=== 20th and 21st centuries ===
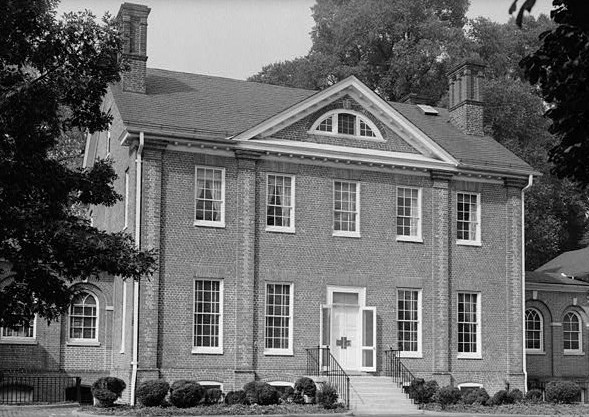
Mount Clare in October 1958

Beginning in January 2012, a collaborative operating agreement between Baltimore's Department of Recreation and Parks and the B&O Railroad Museum and the National Society of The Colonial Dames of America's Maryland Chapter, a descendants' heritage group. The local Dames has administered the site since 1917. The B&O Railroad Museum, located a mile northeast of Mount Clare, provides seasonal train rides to and from its Mount Clare Shops museum complex for visitors, and has developed tours and exhibits noting the railroad and Civil War history of the site.

The second small passenger station (Mount Clare Station) to supplement its original, little-known, waterfront first station on West Pratt Street (between South Charles and Light Streets along with an extensive complex of workshops, furnaces, warehouses and foundries to maintain the new growing transportation system a mile to the northeast on the edge of the estate were named the Mount Clare Shops. The Colonial Dames with their experienced staff, volunteers, docents and historians will be telling the story of the mansion itself and its furnishings/decorations with the colonial lifestyle of both the Carroll family and several subsequent owners in the 19th century, their relatives and visitors, with the slaves/servants employed in the house, gardens, and outlying grounds and plantation outside of Baltimore.

== Access ==
The manor house has been appointed with historically relevant furnishings and is open to the public. Guided tours are preceded by an introductory video and include a walk through the entire house, together encompassing about 45 to 60 minutes.

== See also ==
- National Register of Historic Places listings in South and Southeast Baltimore
- List of National Historic Landmarks in Maryland
