= Graham-Hughes House =

Historic house in Maryland, United States

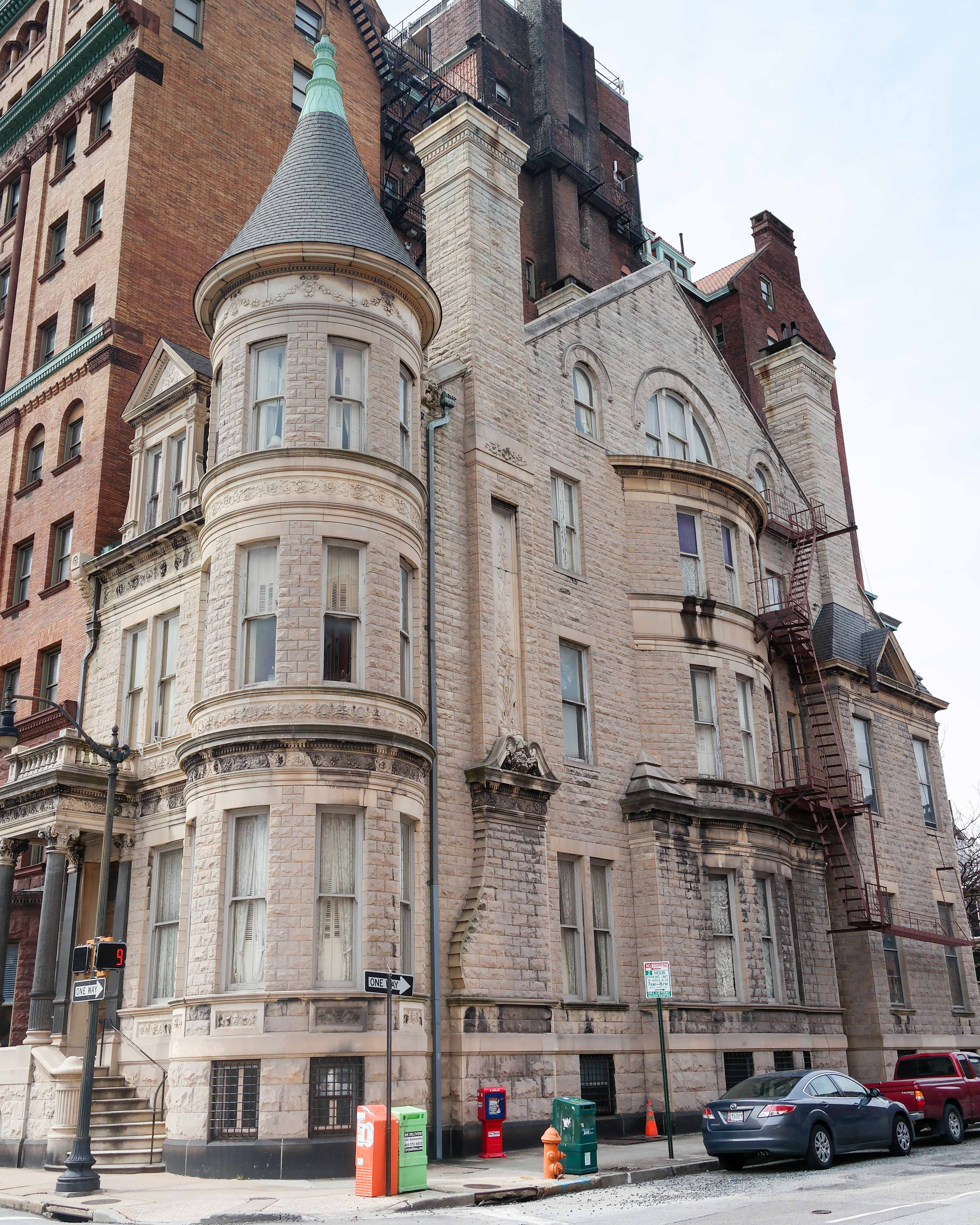
- The Graham-Hughes House in the Mount Vernon Historic District of Baltimore, Maryland

General information
- Architectural style: Châteauesque
- Location: Baltimore, Maryland
- Coordinates: 39.298474°N 76.615991°W
- Named for: George and Sarah Graham; Isabella Graham Hughes
- Completed: March, 1888

Design and construction
- Architect(s): George Archer
- Main contractor: John Waters; M.O. Travers

The Graham-Hughes House is a Châteauesque residence in the Mount Vernon Place Historic District of Baltimore, Maryland. The house was designed by Baltimore architect George Archer and completed in 1888. It had been attributed to architect Charles E. Cassell and mistakenly thought to have been built in 1895 until discovery of an article in the March 12, 1888, edition of the Baltimore Sun crediting Archer as the architect and Baltimore jail warden John Waters as the builder.

The house is named for original owners George and Sarah Graham. Their daughter, Isabella, married Thomas Hughes and lived in the house until her death in 1977.
