= O'Carroll =

Irish clan

O'Carroll Ó Cearbhaill
- Arms of O'Carroll
- Parent house: Ciannachta
- Country: Kingdom of Éile
- Founder: Cian mac Ailill Aulom
- Current head: Fredrick Arthur O'Carroll
- Final ruler: Tiege Cian O'Carroll
- Titles: Kings of Éile
- Cadet branches: Carrol of Maryland

O'Carroll (Irish: Ó Cearbhaill), also known as simply Carroll, Carrol or Carrell, is a Gaelic Irish clan which is the most prominent sept of the Ciannachta (also known as Clan Cian). Their genealogies claim that they are kindred with the Eóganachta (themselves led by the O'Sullivans and MacCarthys), descended paternally from Ailill Aulom. From the Middle Ages until 1552, the family ruled an area within the Kingdom of Munster known as Éile. The last monarch Tiege Cian O'Carroll surrendered and regranted to the Tudor Kingdom of Ireland.

== Etymology ==
Notable is the history of the Ó Cearbhaill whose territory, known as Ely O'Carroll in Éile, consisted of the pasture lands of Ballycrinass, Rosscullenagh and Drumcan, extending to the Lake of Leghagh, commonly Laghaghirisallive and bounded on the west by the lands called Laghenagarken and on the east adjoining or near to Glencrokin. This was always known as Ely O'Carroll. The mountain land extended from the Laghanagerah (Lochan na gCaorach) to Polle Dowa (Poll Dubh in Roscomroe) and then in a south easterly direction to the Slieve Bloom Mountains, which are the limits between Ely O'Carroll and Upper Ossory meeting at a village called Garryvoe or Scully's land.

The Ely O'Carroll sept was the most powerful and most famous, but there were at least four other septs, O'Carroll of Oriel in the Dundalk area, O' Carrolls of Ossory in the Carlow/Kilkenny area and two septs in the Kerry area. The prefix "O'" is very often dropped in the case of this surname, occasionally replaced with "Mac". Carvill is another anglicization of the same family name.

The family name Ó Cearbhaill goes back to a given name Cearbhall. Although the etymology of this name is often given as 'valorous in battle' or similar (literally 'lord of hacking' from Old Irish cerb 'hacking' and the suffix -al originally meaning 'lord'), a more likely original meaning is 'crooked mouth' or 'crooked member' (from cerr 'crooked' and bél 'mouth' or ball 'member'). For this at first glance odd name compare the etymologies of the names Campbell and Cameron.

== History ==
Of Gaelic Irish descent, the Carrolls have their origins in the ancient kingdom of Éile, commonly anglicized Ely, as a branch of the ruling O'Carroll family. The Ely O'Carroll come from counties Offaly and Tipperary in Ireland. The sept is also known as Eile and Clan Cian.

According to historian C. Thomas Cairney, the O'Carrolls were one of the chiefly families of the Eile who in turn were from the Dumnonii or Laigin who were the third wave of Celts to settle in Ireland during the first century BC.

One descendant, Charles Carroll of Carrollton (1737–1832), was a wealthy landowner in Maryland and a signer of the Declaration of Independence in 1776. His cousin, Daniel Carroll, was a signer of the U.S. Constitution. Daniel's brother was John Carroll, the first Catholic Bishop (Archbishop of Baltimore) in the United States.

Historic Ely O'Carroll surnames are: Carroll, Bohan/Bowen, Dooley, Meagher/Maher/Mahar/Mahan, Kelly/Kealy, Flanagan, Corcoran, Healy, Nevin, O'Connor.

Clan Cian was also known as the Cianachta, the Race of Cian, the youngest son of Olioll Ollum King of Munster and grandson of King Eoghan Mor the 1st (known as) Mogh Nuadath of Leith Mogha (Mogha’s Half) of southern Ireland, of the Milesian race of Heber, who contested for supremacy of all Ireland in the second century of the Christian Era.

The Cianachta were led for over 1500 years by a recognized king, prince, high chief, or ruling lord chosen from members of the O’Carroll-Carroll and rival houses of the noble septs of Éile.

In the fifth century the Cianacht Chief, Éile Righ Derg (Éile, the Red King) ruled the territory that came to be known as Ely O'Carroll (to distinguish the area from other O'Carroll kingdoms and lands). The Kingdom of Éile (Ely) was located anciently in Ormond in the Counties Tipperary, Waterford and extending into Offaly, Leix, and Kilkenny.

Cearbhaill (Carroll) Son, of Aeodh, and Chief of the Cianachta was King of Éile at the turn of the first millennium. This Cearbhaill, the King of Éile, led the Elyans at the Battle of Clontarf in 1014 with the High King of Ireland, Brian Boru. F.J. "Éile" O'Carroll, the late O'Carroll of Éile O'Carroll created Clan Cian through the Charter of Re-Formation in 1982-1983??as his personal clan for all Cianachta whose families originally lived within the regions ruled by The O'Carroll of Éile O'Carroll in Ireland as well as to all people who wish to honor their background and the ideals that Clan Cian promotes - Irish culture in all its manifestations and the exploration of expatriate Irish's roots back to Ireland.

=== Betham's History of O'Carroll ===
The following is quoted from the Ordnance survey letters to King's County (Offaly) 1838 cit. Sir William Betham's Irish Antiquarian Researches. Part I, Pg.95. Sir William Betham (1779–1853) was the Ulster King of Arms and can be considered a fairly reliable source as such.

The family of O'Carroll, according to the Irish antiquaries, are descended from Kean, the third son of Olioll Olum, King of Munster. Teige, the eldest son of this Kean, was a distinguished warrior, who by killing in battle his three rivals, procured for Cormac Mac Art, King of Ulster, the Monarchy of Ireland. Cormac rewarded him with a grant of land in Connaught called Lurgny Gallen and Culavin, he paying to the King of Connaught and his successors, 150 milch cows in May; 100 beeves and 100 barrels of mead or Metheglin at Alhallontide yearly, forever.

He had two sons, Conla and Cormac Galeng; to the latter he gave the lands of Lurgny Gallen, now called the Barony of Gallen in the County of Mayo and Culavin, which were possessed by his descendants, the O'Haras and O'Garas.

Conla, the eldest son, possessed the lands afterwards called Duthec Éile, i.e., the Estate of Éile, from Eile Ridheargs, of which his descendants were styled Kings, there being no other title of honour in use in Ireland before the coming of the English.

Cearbhaill, the twelfth according to some, and the 16th in descent according to other authorities, from the above Éile, gave name to the Sept of the O'Carrolls, i.e., the descendants of Cearbhuill. The tenth in descent from him was Teige or Thatheus O'Cearbhuill Boy, King of Éile, who caused the Box of Dimma to be gilt, died about the middle of the 12th century and was succeeded by his son.

Maolroona O'Carroll or O'Cearbhaill, King of Éile, was succeeded by his brother.

Donald O'Carroll, who was King of Ely at the coming of the English under Strongbow and from him are descended the principal houses of this family.

Maolroona O'Carroll, whose daughter Grace, or Grania, was married to Ulick Burke, Lord of Clanrickard, and was mother of Rickard Sassanagh Burke, the first Earl, joined with O'Brien and others against the English Government and gave them much trouble. He died A.D. 1532.

His son Fergonamuin or Ferdinando O'Carroll, who succeeded his father as O'Carroll, concluded a treaty with Leonard, Lord Gray, Lord Deputy of Ireland, 12 June 1538, by which he consented for himself and his successors, the O'Carrolls, Capitanci de Ely O'Carroll, to pay the King 12d. for every carucate of land in Ely O'Carroll, one hundred and twenty marks on the nomination of the chief, and on general hostings to supply the Chief Governor of Ireland with twelve horsemen and twenty four foot men, all well equipped for war with provisions for forty days at the expense of O'Carroll; that on all journeys to those parts, they should supply the Lord Deputy and suite with provisions for three days; that the Lord Deputy should be supplied with provisions by O'Carroll for eighty gallowglasses for three months every year and be permitted to make a road or roads through Ely O'Carroll at his pleasure.

In 1548 Teige Caoch O'Carroll, son of Ferdinando, called by Sir James Ware, petty King of Ely, routed the English out of his country, but afterwards submitted and was created Baron of Ely in 1532 (I have not been able to find the record of this patent) which he did not long enjoy, having been slain by his own Sept headed by his own kinsman and competitor Cahir O'Carroll, who was afterwards slain by William Adhar O'Carroll, younger brother of Teige, who was knighted 30 March 1567 and made Governor of Ely and Captain of his Nation by Sir Henry Sidney, Lord Justice of Ireland. Sir William died 28 April 1579. His natural son Sir Cahir or Charles O'Carroll, was knighted by Sir John Perrott, Lord Deputy in 1584.

Sir Mulrooney O'Carroll, son of Sir William, was knighted by Sir George Carew, L. D. of Ireland, at Dublin Castle, St. James's Day, 1 March 1603, being the day of the Coronation of King James I.

Roger O'Carroll, son and heir of Sir Mulrooney, was ousted out of his estates by Cromwell, he having attached himself to the King's party under the Duke of Ormond, but his eldest son and heir, Charles O'Carroll, was in great favour with Kings Charles II and James the I, who were not able to restore him to his paternal estate; the latter made him grants of large tracts of land on the Monoccasy River in the Province of Maryland in the North America, which was divided into three manors of 20,000 acres (81 km^{2}) each and called after the possession he had lost in Ireland, viz., Ely O'Carroll and Doughoregan. The third was called Carrolston.

This gentleman was also made Attorney General of the Province and his estates are still in the possession of his grandson, Charles O'Carroll of Carrolston, Esq. aged 90 years, whose father and himself have been members of the senate of that State.

Mary, the daughter of the last mentioned Charles, was married to Richard Caton Esq., of the State of Maryland, by whom she was mother to her Excellency Marianne, the present Marchioness of Wellesley and three other daughters Elizabeth, Louisa-Catharine (Lady Harvey) and Emily.

Sir James Carroll, who was Mayor of Dublin, was knighted by Sir Arthur Chichester, Lord Deputy at Loghroer, the 30th of September 1609. His father, Thomas O'Carroll, being oppressed by the chief of his family, came to live in Dublin.

Sir James Carroll had a grant of the Abbey of Baltinglass and was ancestor to the present High Sheriff of the County of Wicklow, Henry Griffiths (Carroll) of Ballymore Esq.

Donagh, or Denis O'Carroll, descended from Donogh O'Carroll, brother to Mulrooney O'Carroll, Chief of his name, who died in 1532, was possessed of the estates of Modereeny and Buolybrack in Tipperary and was ousted by Cromwell. He married O'Kennedy's daughter and had thirty sons, whom he formed into a troop of horse and presented to Duke of Ormond for the service of King Charles I. On the Restoration, John, his son, had a grant of his lands at Killury in the Co. of Galway, where he married the daughter of O'Crean by Margaret, the daughter of Lord Athenry. His eldest son James Carroll, was ancestor to the family at Killury; Daniel O'Carroll, his second son, entered into the military service of the King of Spain and was made a Knight of the Order of Saint Iago. He was afterwards, through the interest of the Duke of Ormond, made a Lieutenant-Colonel in the British Service by Queen Anne, in which he rose to the rank of Lt. General, obtained permission to bear the Insignia of the Order of St. Iago in England, had also the style of Sir Daniel and was Colonel of a Regiment of Horse. His grandson, John Whitley O'Carroll, was British resident at Saxe Weimar in 1804.

Three other O'Carrolls, John, Donagh and Kedagh, obtained grants of land in Connaught from King Charles II in compensation for their losses in Leinster.

From them are descended the families of Springhill, Tirlogh, Ardagh, Carragh and Dunmore in the Co. of Galway; Forthill in the County of Mayo and Doraville in the County of Clare. The other principal families now existing are those of Emmell in the King's County; Thurles, Ballingarry, Nenagh, Littlefield and Annemead in Tipperary; Rockfield in the County of Wicklow and Coolroe in the County of Carlow.

John Carroll of Stephen's Green, Esq., late M.P. for New Ross is the representative of this last family. Owen Carroll represented the King's County in King James's Parliament in 1689.

=== Contemporary Chief dispute ===
A few of the other families which resided within the kingdom of the O'Carrolls were the O'Meaghers/O'Meachair (Maher), O'Caseys, O'Haras, and O'Garas. All of these family surnames, and related septs, also trace their origins to Cian, or Cianachts but many dispute the notion of an overarching Clan Cian. In MacLysaght’s definitive work Irish Families there are over 200 Irish surnames listed and while recognising that there are many more Irish names it is now considered that these names constitute the main name-bearing Irish septs. Many of these septs developed out of larger groups or clans which predated the development of surnames, as in the case of O’Brien in relation to the Dal Cás or O’Higgins in relation to the Cenél Fiachach, or, in this case, O'Carroll in relation to the Cianachta. However, these larger groupings seldom gave rise to surnames in themselves.

Specifically in the case of Munster, The Great Book of Irish Genealogies compiled between 1645 – 66 by Dubhaltach Mac Fhirbhisigh and edited more recently by Nollaig Ó Muraíle (2003), in Vol. II the following pre-surname population groups are listed:

Eoghanacht pp 549–599 Dál Cais pp 599–633 Dealbhna pp 633–645 Clanna Céin p. 645 = Clan Cian Clann Tadch Meic Céin pp 647–661 = Clan Tadch son of Cian Síol Luighdheach meic Íochta pp 661–683 About The Cianachta - Clan Cian

Clan Cian was founded and recognized by the late F. J. O'Carroll, of Éile O'Carroll, Chief of the Name. Fredrick Arthur O'Carroll, has since assumed the mantle of Chief of the Name with the backing of his Council of Chieftains. Chief Fred, descends from the ancient Kings and Princes of Éile O'Carroll. The Kingdom of Éile (Ely) resides in the heart of south-central Ireland. The O'Carroll is a recognized member of the Standing Council of Irish Chiefs and Chieftains. Not all of the current recognized Chiefs on the Standing Council live in Ireland, The O'Carroll, the Chief of Clan Cian, currently resides in the United States.

The name Cianachta in Irish means "of the Race of Cian," and so, Clan Cian in modern English. The Cianachta were recognized as a racial group in ancient Ireland and now called again to assemble as a clan in these modern times. We are dedicated to the preservation of the Éile O'Carroll Territory including the Kingdom of Éile and the O'Carroll family and all related families histories. The clan represents the O'Carroll/Carroll families and also includes of all the related, family septs, dependent family septs of Éile O'Carroll and other parts of Ireland, and worldwide. Clan Cian has an appointed Council of Chieftains and Clan Officers that preside over certain designated regional areas appointed by The O'Carroll, Chief of Éile O'Carroll and Clan Cian.

Historically according to Edward McLysaght the first Chief Herald of the newly formed Republic of Ireland, the term "clan" or "clanne" in Ireland refers to the people living within a certain territory, whereas in Scotland a clan is composed of people of a specific family. In ancient Ireland, the old kingdom of Éile O'Carroll (Éile Ui Cearbhaill) included many family surnames found today. Of those families, the powerful O'Carrolls were kings, overlords, and later chiefs of their people. A few of the major families related by blood to the O'Carrolls, which lived within the Kingdom of Éile O'Carroll were the O'Meaghers, O'Caseys, O'Haras, and O'Garas. All of these family surnames, and other related septs, are members of the Clan of Cian - the Cianachta.

== Maryland ==
A branch of the Carrolls moved to Colonial Maryland and were prominent Roman Catholics. They played a formative role in the foundation of the United States of America as Charles Carroll of Carrollton signed the United States Declaration of Independence. Second cousins of Charles Carroll of Carrollton were Daniel Carroll, who signed the Articles of Confederation and the U.S. Constitution, and Daniel's brother, the Bishop John Carroll, who was the first Bishop and Archbishop of the United States and Founder of Georgetown University. A distant cousin of this branch of the Carroll family was Charles Carroll (barrister), a convert to Anglicanism. William Thomas Carroll (1802-1863) served as the fifth Clerk of the United States Supreme Court (from 1827 until his death). Other notable Carrolls were Brigadier General Samuel S. Carroll, Thomas King Carroll and daughter Anna Ella Carroll, and James Carroll. The Carrolls of Maryland have also intermarried with the "Blenheim branch" of the Lee family of Virginia.

In addition to these individuals, the Mitchell family of Maryland claim descent from the aforementioned Charles Carroll of Carrollton through the line of their founding matriarch Lillie Mae Carroll Jackson who, in addition to being a descendant of his, is revered today as one of the earliest and most prominent of the leaders of the civil rights movement.

The Carroll family are famed for the number of beautiful homes and manors they have built across Maryland. Most famous is Doughoregan Manor, which remains a family seat in the possession of descendants of Charles Carroll of Carrollton, who is buried there. Another early residence of this branch of the family was the Carroll House of Annapolis. The later Homewood House was the birthplace of Governor John Lee Carroll, and is now a part of Johns Hopkins University.

Mount Clare, built by Charles Carroll the Barrister, a distant cousin of the Carrolls of Doughoregan Manor, is the oldest extant Colonial era structure in Baltimore.

A partial, summarized pedigree of the Carroll family:

- Domhnall O'Carroll, King of Éile (Ely)
- Dónal Dhearg (the Red) O'Carroll
- William Álainn (the Handsome) O'Carroll
- Donogh O'Carroll
- Teige O'Carroll
- Donough O'Carroll
- Anthony O'Carroll
- Daniel O'Carroll of Aghagurty and Litterluna (1642-1688)
  - Charles Carroll the Settler, (1660-1720)
    - Charles Carroll of Annapolis, (1702-1782), Land sold to lay-out the town of Baltimore, 1729
      - Charles Carroll of Carrollton, (1737-1832), member of Continental Congress, last surviving signer of Declaration of Independence (1776), first U.S. Senator from Maryland. Laid "first stone" for Baltimore and Ohio Railroad, 1828.
        - Charles Carroll of Homewood, (1775-1825), constructed house, 1800; later site of Johns Hopkins University campus, 1900.
          - Charles Carroll V, (1801-1862)
            - John Lee Carroll, (1830-1911), Governor of Maryland (his great-grandchildren own Doughoregan Manor)
            - Louisa Mary Carroll (1832-1894), married George Cavendish-Taylor (1826-1889)
              - Julia Cavendish-Taylor (1866-1931), married Phillip Benedict Joseph Petre (1864-1908), 3 children including the 16th Baron Petre
    - Daniel Carroll of Duddington (1707–1734), Daniel and his wife Ann (Rozier) Carroll (1711-1764). Owned the land that would eventually become Capitol Hill including the Capitol, Library of Congress and other federal buildings.
      - Charles Carroll of Duddington (1729–1773)
        - Daniel Carroll of Duddington (1764-1849) Daniel
        - Charles Carroll of Bellevue (1767-1823)
          - Henry Carroll (1772-1820), Secretary to Henry Clay, Treaty of Ghent Peace Commission
          - Charles H. Carroll (1794–1865), Member of the U.S. House of Representatives, married Alida Van Rensselaer (1801–1832), niece of Jacob Rutsen Van Rensselaer and the granddaughter of Robert Van Rensselaer (1740–1802)
          - William Thomas Carroll (1802–1863), 5th Clerk of the United States Supreme Court
            - Samuel Sprigg Carroll (1831–1893), a brigadier general during the American Civil War
              - Samuel Sprigg Carroll (1875-1935)
                - Mahlon Ashford Carroll (1921-2002)
          - Elizabeth Barbara Carroll (1806–1866), who was married to Henry Fitzhugh (1801–1866)
  - Kean Carroll of Aghagurty (1663-1701?), brother of Charles Carroll the Settler
    - Daniel Carroll I, (1696-1751), Land sold to lay out the town of Baltimore, 1729
      - Daniel Carroll II, (1730-1796), member of Continental Congress, one of the first United States Representatives in the House from Maryland.
      - Father John Carroll, (1735-1815), later Bishop and Archbishop of Baltimore, first appointed to an American diocese.

== Notable members ==
- Maol Ruanaidh Cam Ó Cearbhaill (d. 1329), musician
- Daniel O'Carroll (died 1713), lieutenant-colonel of Berwick's regiment
- Charles Carroll (barrister) (1723–1783), Maryland (USA) barrister
- Daniel Carroll (1730–1796), U.S. politician, signatory of both the Articles of Confederation and the United States Constitution
- John Carroll (archbishop) (1735–1815), first Catholic Bishop in the United States and Founder of Georgetown University
- William Carroll (Tennessee politician) (1788–1844), Governor of Tennessee
- William Henry Carroll (1810–1868), Confederate Army general
- Laurence Carroll (1856-1914), anti-imperial Irish Buddhist monk in British Burma, ordination name Dhammaloka
- William Carroll (Australian politician) (1872–1936), Australian senator
- Richard O'Carroll (killed 1916), Irish Patriot and Union Leader
- Michael O'Carroll (1911-2004), Irish motoring expert and TV/Radio/Newspaper correspondent
- Julian Carroll (1931–2023), 54th governor of Kentucky
- Warren H. Carroll, Catholic historian & author
- Mella Carroll (b 1934), High Court judge, first female appointed to superior court in Ireland
- Katharine Bulbulia née O'Carroll (b 1943), Irish senator
- Tom O'Carroll (b 1945), British paedophilia advocate
- Brendan O'Carroll, (b 1955), Irish comedian
- Brian Carroll (b 1956), American businessman
- John O'Carroll (b 1958), British artist
- Bill Carroll (broadcaster) (b 1959), American radio personality
- William Allan Carroll (b 1959), professional ice hockey player
- Sean B. Carroll (b 1960), American evolutionary biologist
- Sean M. Carroll (b 1966), American theoretical physicist.
- Susie O'Carroll, Irish sportsperson
- Will Carroll (b 1970), American sports writer
- Claude Carroll (b 1980),

Battalion Chief Collage Professor

== See also ==
- Irish nobility
- Irish royal families
- Birr Castle
- Leap Castle
- Saint Cronan
- Gerald FitzGerald, 15th Earl of Desmond
- James Fitzedmund Fitzgerald
- Kings of Airgíalla
- Irish clans
