= Charles B. Hitchcock =

American politician (died 1875)

Member of the Maryland House of Delegates from the Harford County district
- In office 1864–1864 Serving with Thomas Archer and Richard B. McCoy

Personal details
- Born: c. 1819
- Died: May 20, 1875 (aged 56) near Havre de Grace, Maryland, U.S.
- Party: Unconditional Union
- Occupation: Politician

Charles B. Hitchcock (c. 1819 – May 20, 1875) was an American politician from Maryland. He served as a member of the Maryland House of Delegates, representing Harford County in 1864.

== Career ==
Hitchcock was a member of the Maryland House of Delegates, representing Harford County in 1864. He was elected on the Unconditional Union Party ticket.

In 1866 and 1867, Hitchcock served as a town commissioner of Havre de Grace. Hitchcock served as a collector on the Susquehanna and Tidewater Canal upon until his resignation in 1872.

== Personal life ==
Hitchcock died on May 20, 1875, at the age of 56, at his home near Havre de Grace.
