= Whitaker's Mill Historic District =

Historic district in Maryland, United States

- U.S. National Register of Historic Places
- U.S. Historic district
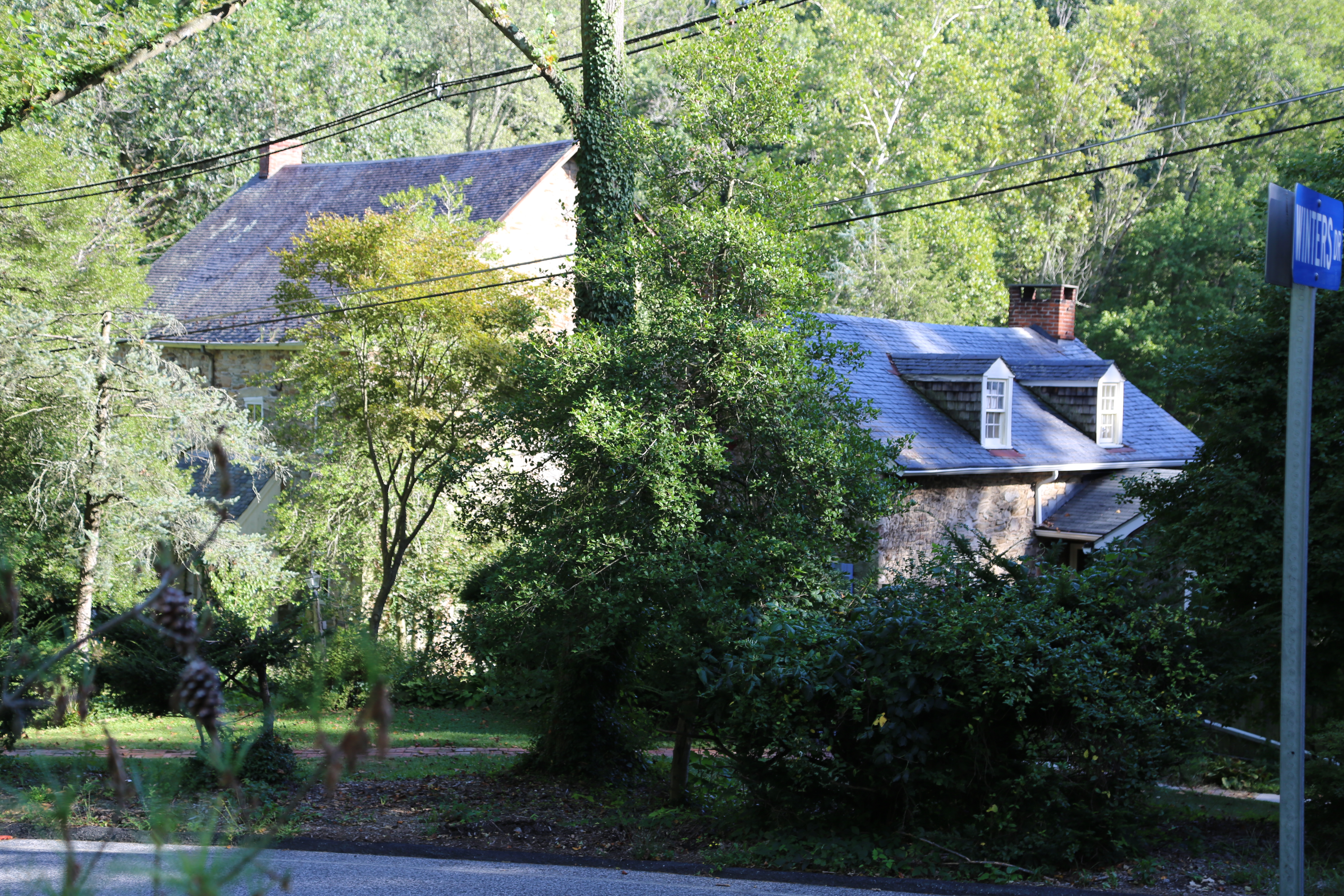
- Whitaker's Mill Historic District 2014

- Location within Maryland Location within the United States
- Location: 1210, 1212, and 1213 Whitaker Mill Rd., Joppa, Maryland
- Coordinates: 39°29′51″N 76°21′15″W
- Area: 13 acres (5.3 ha)
- Built: 1851
- Architectural style: Greek Revival, Federal
- NRHP reference No.: 90001021
- Added to NRHP: July 16, 1990

Whitaker's Mill Historic District is a national historic district near Joppa, Harford County, Maryland, United States. It includes three early- to mid-19th-century buildings: the 2 1/2-story rubble stone Whitaker's Mill built in 1851, the 1 1/2-story rubble stone miller's house, and the log-and-frame Magness House, begun about 1800 as the miller's house for the first mill on the site. The district also includes an iron truss bridge known as Harford County Bridge No. 51, constructed in 1878, and the oldest such span in the county. The grist mill closed operations about 1900.

It was added to the National Register of Historic Places in 1990.
