= Simeon Spicer =

American politician (died 1908)

Member of the Maryland House of Delegates from the Harford County district
- In office 1867–1867 Serving with Nicholas H. Nelson, Samuel M. Whiteford, Joshua Wilson

Personal details
- Born: c. 1836 Harford County, Maryland, U.S.
- Died: March 6, 1908 (aged 72) Baltimore, Maryland, U.S.
- Resting place: Fallston, Maryland, U.S.
- Spouse: Adelaide Guyton
- Children: 3
- Occupation: Politician

Simeon Spicer (c. 1836 – March 6, 1908) was an American politician from Maryland. He served as a member of the Maryland House of Delegates, representing Harford County in 1867.

== Early life ==
Simeon Spicer was born in Harford County, Maryland, to Eliza and Abraham Spicer.

== Career ==
Spicer served in the 7th Maryland Infantry Regiment of the Union Army in the Civil War. He reached the rank of captain.

Spicer served as a member of the Maryland House of Delegates, representing Harford County in 1867.

Spicer worked as an inspector at the Baltimore Customs House for 23 years.

== Personal life ==
Spicer married Adelaide Guyton. They had two daughters and one son, Esther, Arabelle and R. Barclay. Spicer was an elder in the Park Avenue Meeting House of Friends.

Spicer died of pneumonia on March 6, 1908, at the age of 72, at his home at 2004 Park Avenue in Baltimore. He was buried in Fallston.
