= Daniel O'Carroll =

Daniel O'Carroll (or O'Caroll) (died 4 November 1750) was a British Army officer who used the style of a baronet.

He was the son of John O'Carroll (died 12 August 1733) of Beaugh, County Galway, by his second wife Margaret Crean. Margaret Crean was the daughter of Andrew O'Crean (or Crean) of Coursfield, County Mayo, and of County Sligo, and his wife Margaret, daughter of Baron Athenry.

He was a captain in Henry Crofton's regiment, which fought on the Spanish side in the War of the Spanish Succession, against Britain and its allies. However, according to a pedigree published in the appendices of the 1723 edition of Geoffrey Keating's The General History of Ireland, he was "created by the King of Spain a knight of the most military Order of St. Jago, for singular services done to that crown in the time of war, [but] he left the said service of Spain in a disgust, and afterwards had by a patent from Queen Anne, the rank of knighthood."

"At the instance of the Duke of Ormond" he was appointed lieutenant-colonel of a "regiment of horse" on 1 March 1709, and colonel on 2 December 1710. The regiment was disbanded on 22 December 1711, and shortly thereafter he assumed the style of a baronet, although there is no patent or other record of such a creation in either Great Britain or Ireland. His obituaries in The Gentleman's Magazine and The London Magazine both describe his baronetcy as one in the Baronetage of Great Britain rather than the Baronetage of Ireland, as do baronetage compilers William Betham and Robert Beatson, who both describe him as "of Denton, Yorkshire".

He was promoted to brigadier-general on 29 October 1735, major-general on 2 July 1739, and lieutenant-general on 18 February 1742. He married in or before 1712, Elizabeth Jervoise, eldest daughter of Thomas Jervoise of Herriard, Hampshire, by his first wife Elizabeth, daughter of Sir Gilbert Clarke of Somersall Hall, Derbyshire. They had two sons, Daniel and John.

His wife died in London on 30 December 1728, and was buried on 6 January 1729 at St Martin-in-the-Fields. He was buried in the same vault on 12 November 1750, and the administration of his estate, which was under £200 in value, was granted to his son "Sir Daniel O'Carroll, Baronet", on 20 November 1750.

His eldest son, Daniel, was probably born about 1717. He was appointed as a captain in Ligonier's Horse in May 1752, and died without male issue on 30 January 1758 in the Dublin marshalsea. The style of baronet was then adopted by his younger brother John, who lived at York and Bath, Somerset. John O'Carroll was born on 14 February 1722 and was baptised at St Martin-in-the-Fields on 25 February 1722. He was alive on 10 June 1777 for the marriage of his son and niece, John and Elizabeth, the daughter of the second baronet, but the date of his death is unknown. The younger John was British Resident at Saxe-Weimar; he died at Frankfurt on 13 January 1818. The title of baronet was adopted successively by his two sons: Jervoise and John. Jervoise O'Carroll died at Hamburg in 1831 and John at Hildesheim on 2 June 1835. Neither is known to have been married or to have had any issue, and the baronetcy is presumed to be extinct or dormant.
