= Harford National Bank =

Historic building in Bel Air, Maryland, US

- U.S. National Register of Historic Places
- Drawing by the Historic American Buildings Survey

- Location within Maryland Location within the United States
- Location: Wall and Courtland Sts., Bel Air, Maryland
- Coordinates: 39°32′7″N 76°20′59″W
- Area: 0.5 acres (0.20 ha)
- Built: 1889
- Architect: Archer, George; Smith, Clinton
- Architectural style: Romanesque, Richardsonian Romanesque
- NRHP reference No.: 80001814
- Added to NRHP: March 20, 1980

Harford National Bank is a historic bank building located at Bel Air, Harford County, Maryland. It is a one-story, with day-light basement built in a modified Richardson Romanesque style of glazed red brick and rusticated brownstone. It was designed by architect George Archer in 1889.

It was listed on the National Register of Historic Places in 1980.
