= Glenville, Maryland =

Coordinates: 39°36′36″N 76°12′57″W

Glenville is a populated place located in District 2, Hall's Cross Roads, a minor civil division (MCD) of Harford County in the U.S. state of Maryland.

The elevation of Glenville is 190 feet. Glenville appears on the Aberdeen U.S. Geological Survey Map. Harford County is in the Eastern Time Zone.
