= G. Arnold Pfaffenbach =

American politician (1904–1982)

Member of the Maryland House of Delegates
- In office 1935–1937 Serving with James H. Broumel, John E. Clark, Leo M. Moore
- Succeeded by: Marshall T. Heaps

Personal details
- Born: George Arnold Pfaffenbach; September 22, 1904 Havre de Grace, Maryland, U.S.
- Died: June 21, 1982 (aged 77)
- Resting place: Angel Hill Cemetery; Havre de Grace, Maryland, U.S.
- Party: Democratic
- Education: Beacom College; University of Maryland School of Law (LLB)
- Occupation: Politician; lawyer

George Arnold Pfaffenbach (September 22, 1904 – June 21, 1982) was an American politician and lawyer from Maryland. He served as a member of the Maryland House of Delegates, representing Harford County, from 1935 to 1937.

== Early life ==
George Arnold Pfaffenbach was born on September 22, 1904, in Havre de Grace, Maryland, to Mary Ann Martin (née Pearson) and George Pfaffenbach. His father was a lumberman and worked for the ordnance department at Aberdeen Proving Ground. Pfaffenbach graduated from Havre de Grace High School in 1921 and graduated from Beacom College in 1922. He graduated from the University of Maryland School of Law in 1926 with a Bachelor of Laws. He was admitted to the bar on December 14, 1926.

== Career ==
Pfaffenbach started practicing law in Havre de Grace. He also had a real estate and insurance business called The Maryland Company with Omer L. Carson. In 1929, Pfaffenbach became secretary of the Havre de Grace Chamber of Commerce.

Pfaffenbach was a Democrat. Pfaffenbach served as a member of the Maryland House of Delegates, representing Harford County, from 1935 to 1937.

Pfaffenbach was also a secretary and attorney of The Columbian Building Association starting in 1940. He was secretary and treasurer of Angel Hill Cemetery in Havre de Grace.

== Personal life ==
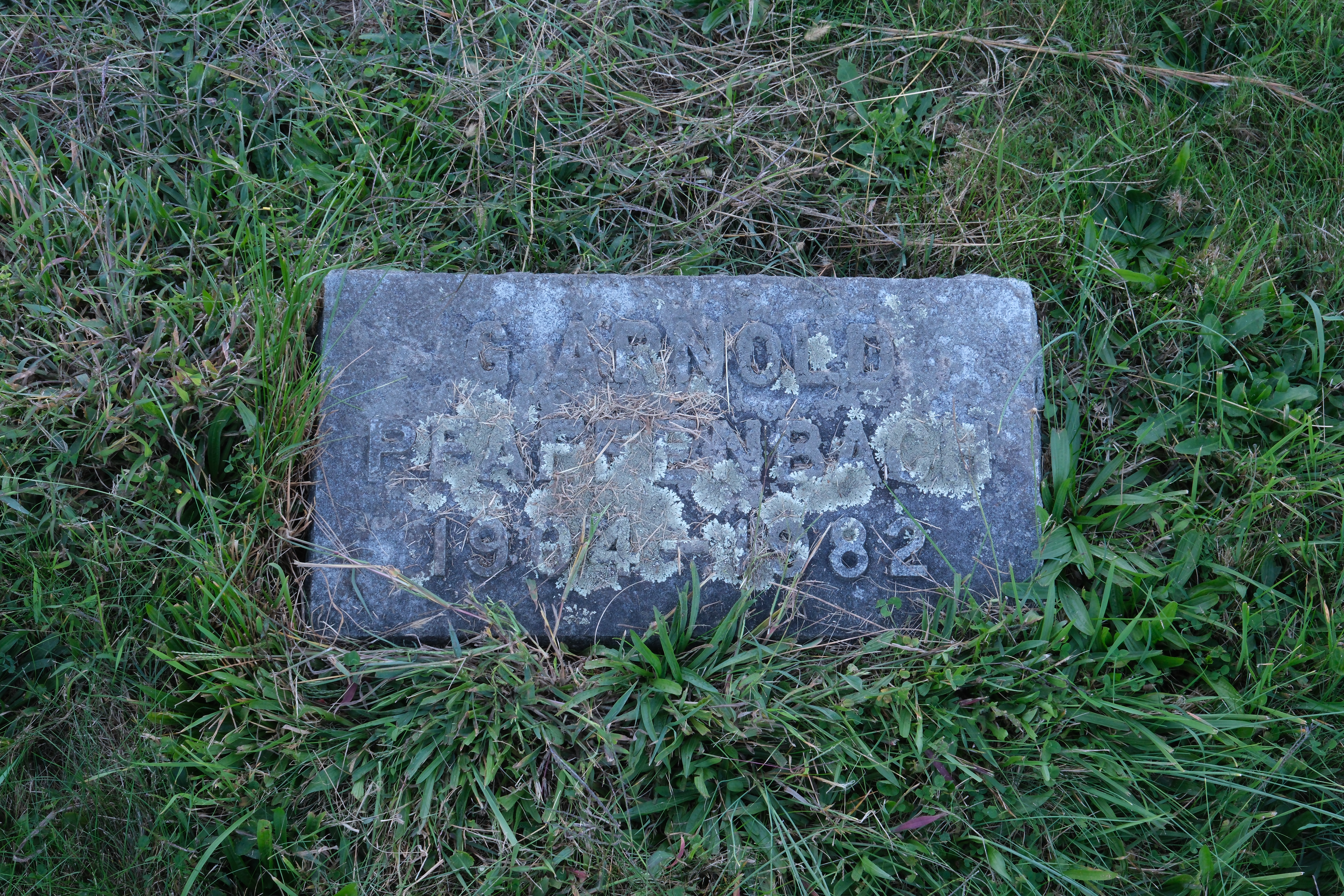
Grave of Pfaffenbach at Angel Hill Cemetery

Pfaffenbach was an organist of Grace Reformed Episcopal Church. He was a vestryman and Sunday School superintendent.

In July 1971, Pfaffenbach's law office was robbed and Pfaffenbach was shot in the side. Pfaffenbach died on June 21, 1982. He was buried at Angel Hill Cemetery in Havre de Grace.
