= Ensor =

The following people have the surname Ensor:

- Abram G. Ensor (died 1959), American politician
- Arthur John Ensor (1905–1995), British-Canadian painter and industrial designer
- Beatrice Ensor (1885–1974), English theosophical educator and pedagogue
- David Ensor (journalist), American news reporter and former national security correspondent for CNN
- David Ensor (politician) (1906–1987), British lawyer, actor, author and Labour Party politician
- Ella B. Ensor Wilson (1838–1913), American social reformer and writer
- Ernest Ensor (1870–1929), English-born Irish cricketer
- George Ensor (1769–1843), Irish author and lawyer
- James Ensor (1860–1949), Belgian painter and printmaker
- Kathy Ensor, American statistician
- Kura Te Whiria Ensor (1925–2015), Māori fashion designer
- Lavelle Ensor (1900–1947), American jockey
- Mick Ensor (1922–1994), highly decorated officer of the Royal New Zealand Air Force
- Patrick Ensor (1946–2007), British newspaper journalist
- Robert Ensor (1877–1958), British writer, poet and journalist
- Sidney Ensor, British Mayor of Thames
- Tony Ensor (rugby union, born 1949), Ireland rugby union player
- Tony Ensor (rugby union, born 1991), New Zealand rugby union player

== Fictional ==
- In the BBC TV sci-fi series Blake's 7, Ensor was the creator of the computer Orac

== See also ==
- 2819 Ensor, minor planet named after James Ensor
- Baddesley Ensor, English village
- Ensor Award, Belgian award named after James Ensor
- Ensor (crater), Mercury crater named after James Ensor
- French Ensor Chadwick
