= Herman W. Hanson =

American politician (1859–1938)

Member of the Maryland House of Delegates from the Harford County district
- In office 1898–1900 Serving with T. Littleton Hanway, Robert Seneca, William M. Whiteford
- Preceded by: John L. G. Lee

Personal details
- Born: January 30, 1859 Harford County, Maryland, U.S.
- Died: December 28, 1938 (aged 79) Edgewood, Maryland, U.S.
- Resting place: Trinity Lutheran Cemetery; Joppa, Maryland, U.S.
- Party: Democratic
- Spouse(s): Amelia (or Emilie) Emmord (m. 1881; died 1903) Louise M. Heiss (died 1938)
- Children: 8
- Education: Bryant & Stratton's Business College
- Occupation: Politician

Herman W. Hanson (January 30, 1859 – December 28, 1938) was an American politician from Maryland. He served as a member of the Maryland House of Delegates, representing Harford County from 1898 to 1900.

== Early life ==
Herman W. Hanson was born on January 30, 1859, near Wheel Post Office in Harford County, Maryland, to Sophia (née Gunther) and Thomas Hanson. His father was a sailor who ran a dairy business in Baltimore. The family moved to Baltimore when Hanson was four and he attended the Lutheran Parochial School. He took a course at Bryant & Stratton's Business College.

== Career ==
At the age of 16, Hanson worked in the dairy business owned by his father. He then worked as a clerk in Baltimore and later as a canner in Abingdon. In 1881, he moved to Harford County and worked as a farmer and canner.

Hanson was a Democrat. He served as a member of the Maryland House of Delegates, representing Harford County from 1898 to 1900.

== Personal life ==
Hanson married Amelia (or Emilie) Emmord, daughter of Frederick Emmord, on October 4, 1881. She died in 1903. They had eight children, including Amelia, Ada, Irene, Ruth and Emmord. Hanson married Louise M. Heiss. She died in September 1938. He was a member of the Lutheran Church.

Herman died on December 28, 1938, at his home in Edgewood. He was buried at Trinity Lutheran Cemetery in Joppa.
