= Lena L. Moore =

American politician (died 1969)

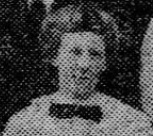
- Lamm in 1910

Member of the Maryland House of Delegates from the Harford County district
- In office 1946–1946 Serving with Earle R. Burkins, John E. Clark, James J. DeRan Jr.
- Appointed by: Herbert O'Conor
- Preceded by: Leo M. Moore
- Succeeded by: William S. James

Personal details
- Born: Lena V. Lamm
- Died: November 17, 1969 (aged 77)
- Resting place: Mount Erin Cemetery; Havre de Grace, Maryland, U.S.
- Party: Democratic
- Spouse: Leo M. Moore (m. 1920; died 1946)
- Children: 3, including Charles M.
- Education: Western Maryland College (BA)
- Occupation: Politician; educator

Lena L. Moore (née Lamm; died November 17, 1969) was an American politician from Maryland. She was appointed as a member of the Maryland House of Delegates, representing Harford County, following the death of her husband Leo M. Moore in 1946.

== Early life ==
Lena V. Lamm graduated from Havre de Grace High School in 1910. She graduated from Western Maryland College (later McDaniel College) with a Bachelor of Arts in instrumental music in 1914.

== Career ==
In August 1914, she was appointed by school commissioners as assistant in Havre de Grace, Maryland.

She was a Democrat. She served as a member of the Maryland House of Delegates, representing Harford County, in 1946. She was appointed by Governor Herbert O'Conor to replace her husband Leo M. Moore after his death.

== Personal life ==
She married Leo M. Moore in January 17, 1920. They had two sons and one daughter, Charles M., Leo M. Jr. and Mrs. Breen Bland.

Moore died on November 17, 1969, at the age of 77. She was buried at Mount Erin Cemetery in Havre de Grace.
