= Getz =

Getz is a surname. Notable people and characters with this surname include:

- Arthur Getz (1913–1996), American artist and illustrator
- Bernhard Getz (1850–1901), Norwegian judge, professor and politician
- Chris Getz (born 1983), American baseball player
- Eyvind Getz (1888–1956), Norwegian barrister and politician
- Gus Getz (1889–1969), American baseball player
- Ileen Getz (1961–2005), American actress
- James Lawrence Getz (1821–1891), American politician and newspaper founder
- Jane Getz (born 1942), American jazz pianist
- John Getz (born 1946), American actor
- Kerry Getz (born 1975), American skateboarder
- Max Getz, American jeweller
- Morton H. Getz (died 1995), American politician
- Nicolai Getz (born 1991), Norwegian chess master
- Stan Getz (1927–1991), American jazz saxophonist
- Stella Getz (born 1977), Norwegian singer
- Yehuda Getz (1924–1995), Tunisian-born rabbi

Fictional characters

- Nate Getz, from the television series NCIS: Los Angeles
- Getz (Breaking Bad)

== See also ==
- Georgi Georgiev-Getz (1926–1996), Bulgarian actor
- Hyundai Getz, a car produced by the Hyundai Motor Company
- Mount Getz, a mountain in Antarctica
- Götz, includes people surnamed Goetz
