= James H. Broumel =

American politician (died 1948)

Member of the Maryland House of Delegates from the Harford County district
- In office 1931–1937 Serving with Marshall T. Heaps, John F. Joesting, Mary E. W. Risteau, John E. Clark, Leo M. Moore, G. Arnold Pfaffenbach

Personal details
- Born: Bel Air, Maryland, U.S.
- Died: December 6, 1948 (aged 41) Emmorton, Maryland, U.S.
- Resting place: St. Mary's Church; Emmorton, Maryland, U.S.
- Party: Democratic
- Spouse: Sara Stearns (m. 1932)
- Children: 3
- Education: St. John's College; University of Baltimore School of Law
- Occupation: Politician

James H. Broumel (died December 6, 1948) was an American politician from Maryland. He served as a member of the Maryland House of Delegates, representing Harford County, from 1931 to 1937.

== Early life ==
James H. Broumel was born in Bel Air, Maryland. He attended Bel Air High School. He attended St. John's College. He graduated from the University of Baltimore School of Law in 1930.

== Career ==
Broumel was a Democrat. He served as a member of the Maryland House of Delegates, representing Harford County, from 1931 to 1937.

== Personal life ==
Broumel married Sara Stearns on January 2, 1932, in Aberdeen, Maryland. They had three sons, James Howard Jr., Thomas Price and Charles Wallace.

Broumel died on December 6, 1948, at the age of 41, at the home of Judge Walter W. Preston in Emmorton, Maryland. He was buried at St. Mary's Church in Emmorton.
