= Lake Eupen =

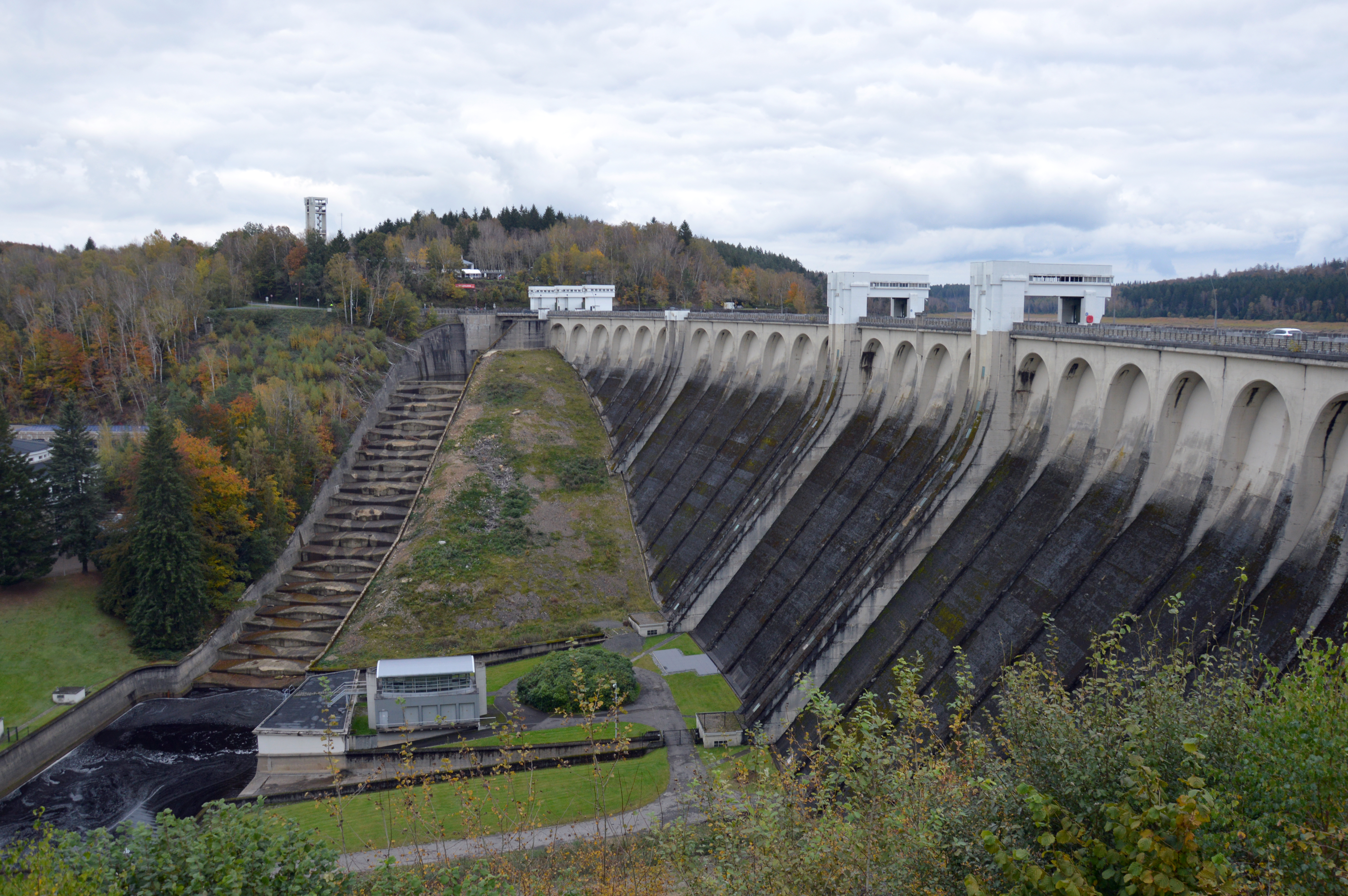
- Dam of the Vesdre

- Location within Belgium
- Location: (German-speaking Community of Belgium) East Belgium
- Coordinates: 50°37′00″N 06°05′32″E
- Type: artificial lake
- Primary inflows: Vesdre, Getz
- Primary outflows: Vesdre
- Catchment area: 105.95 km^{2} (40.91 sq mi)
- Basin countries: Belgium
- Max. length: 3 km (1.9 mi)
- Max. width: 0.3 km (0.19 mi)
- Surface area: 1.26 km^{2} (0.49 sq mi)
- Water volume: 25×10^{6} m^{3} (20,000 acre⋅ft)
- Surface elevation: 360 m (1,180 ft)
- Islands: 0
- Settlements: Eupen

Lake Eupen (German: Wesertalsperre) is an artificial lake near Eupen in East Belgium, not far from High Fens. The lake is created by a dam which was built on the river Vesdre in 1938 but inaugurated only in 1950 by Prince Charles of Belgium. The area has a German-speaking population who refer to the river Vesdre as Weser, but which is distinct from the Weser river in North Germany.
