= James McLean (Maryland politician) =

American politician (died 1956)

Member of the Maryland House of Delegates from the Harford County district
- In office 1949–1950 Serving with J. Rush Baldwin, James J. DeRan Jr., William S. James
- Preceded by: Earle R. Burkins

Personal details
- Born: New York, U.S.
- Died: September 17, 1956 (aged 48) Baltimore County, Maryland, U.S.
- Resting place: St. Mary's Episcopal Church; Emmorton, Maryland, U.S.
- Party: Democratic
- Spouse: Violet Dorothea Burd Grubb
- Children: 3
- Occupation: Politician

James McLean (died September 17, 1956) was an American politician from Maryland. He served as a member of the Maryland House of Delegates, representing Harford County, from 1949 to 1950.

== Early life ==
James McLean was born in New York. He was educated in England.

== Career ==
McLean held a seat on the New York Stock Exchange. He worked with the Cunard Steamship Company and he served as a major with the United States Army during World War II.

McLean was a Democrat. McLean was appointed a member of the Maryland House of Delegates, representing Harford County, from 1949 to 1950, following the death of Earle R. Burkins.

== Personal life ==
McLean married Violet Dorothea Burd Grubb. He had three sons, Peter, Thomas and James. McLean purchased Monmouth Farm in Harford County after World War II.

McLean died on September 17, 1956, at the age of 48, at Franklin Square Hospital in Baltimore County, Maryland. He was buried at St. Mary's Episcopal Church in Emmorton, Maryland.
