= Thomas J. Hatem Memorial Bridge =

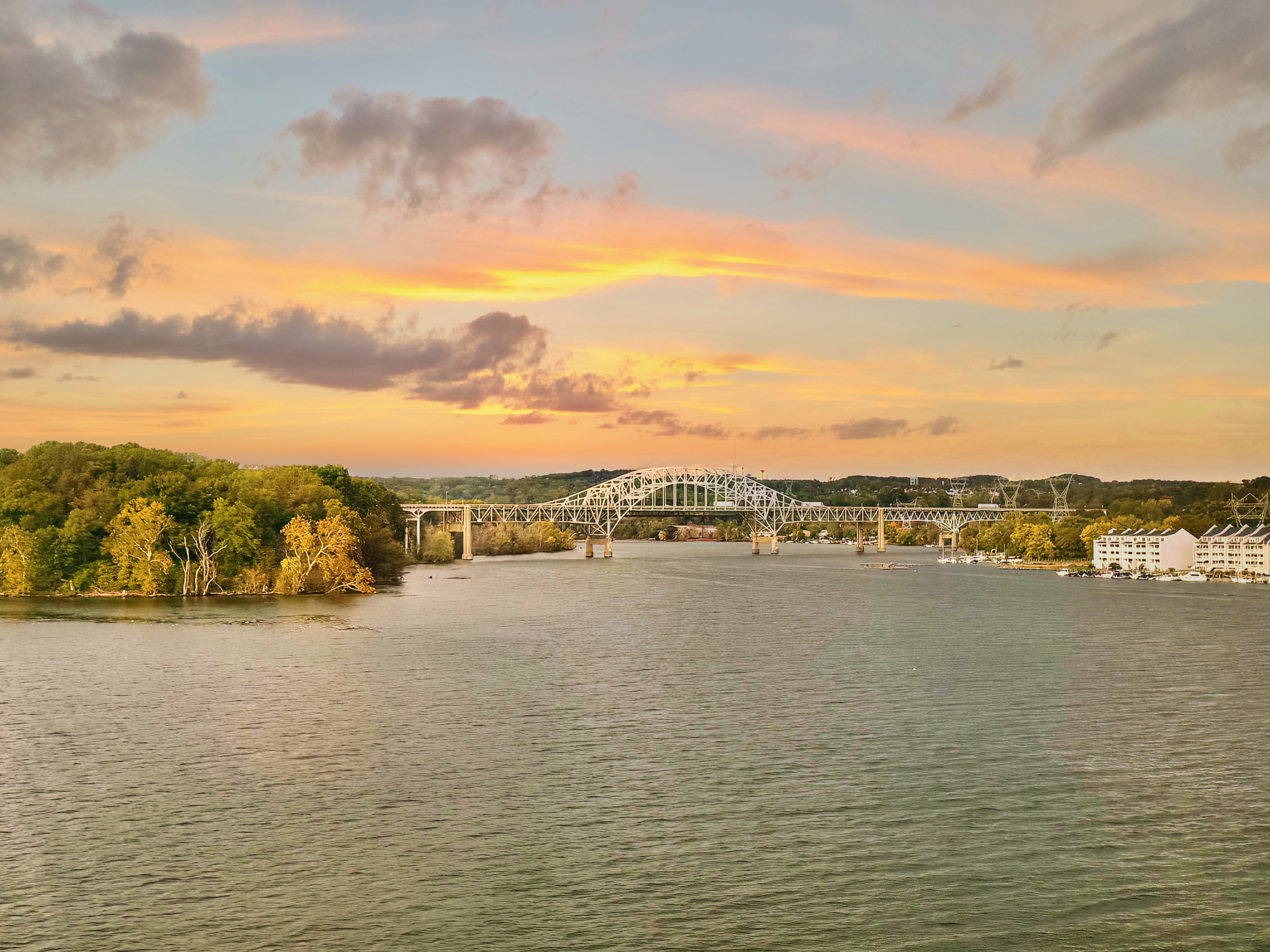
- Hatem Bridge in autumn 2023
- Coordinates: 39°33′38″N 76°05′23″W
- Carries: 4 lanes of US 40
- Crosses: Susquehanna River
- Locale: Havre de Grace, Maryland and Perryville, Maryland
- Named for: Thomas J. Hatem
- Maintained by: Maryland Transportation Authority
- ID number: 300000H-Z040010

Characteristics
- Design: Steel Truss - Thru
- Total length: 7,624 feet (2,324 m)
- Width: 47.9 feet (14.6 m)
- Longest span: 456 feet (139 m)
- Clearance above: 16.0 feet (4.9 m)
- Clearance below: 86.9 feet (26.5 m)

History
- Construction start: February 1939
- Construction end: August 1940
- Construction cost: $4.5 million
- Opened: August 28, 1940; 86 years ago

Statistics
- Daily traffic: 30,217 (in 2010)
- Toll: $8.00 (eastbound) (E-ZPass), $6.00 w/Maryland-issued E-ZPass

Location
- Interactive map of Thomas J. Hatem Memorial Bridge

The Thomas J. Hatem Memorial Bridge is a road bridge in northeast Maryland that crosses the Susquehanna River between Havre de Grace and Perryville via Garrett Island. It carries U.S. Route 40. It is the oldest of the eight toll facilities operated and maintained by the Maryland Transportation Authority, and the southernmost automotive bridge across the Susquehanna.

It is named for Thomas J. Hatem, whose long involvement in Harford County politics (as a Democrat) includes one term in the Maryland House of Delegates, a long stint as a county commissioner, service as state insurance commissioner and six years on the Public Service Commission.

== Background ==
The bridge was far from the first crossing of the Susquehanna River between the Harford County community of Havre de Grace and the Cecil County town of Perryville. A succession of ferries made the trip for more than 200 years, and two railroad bridges were constructed during the last half of the 19th century. The first vehicle bridge was converted from a railroad bridge constructed in 1873. It opened in 1910, and was operated by a group of private citizens as a toll facility until 1923.

The State Roads Commission (SRC), predecessor of the Authority, bought the bridge in 1923 and continued to operate it as a toll facility. The structure was extremely narrow, with a roadway only 13 feet (4.0 m) wide. Heavy trucks inched past each other, and there were many side-swiping accidents on the bridge. Traffic usually moved at a snail’s pace. To alleviate the problem, the SRC in 1926 built a second deck over the old bridge, converting each level into a crossing for one-way traffic. This project was considered one of the most ingenious bridge-engineering feats of the time. Then new problems surfaced. The new deck had a vertical clearance of 12.5 feet (3.8 m) — barely sufficient to accommodate the growing number of commercial vehicles traveling the bridge in the 1930s. Frequently, trucks stacked too high with freight became wedged between the deck and the overhead structure and could proceed only after their tires were deflated to allow adequate clearance. The need for a newer, more modern structure became apparent in the mid-1930s.

At the same time, the Maryland General Assembly authorized the State Roads Commission to formulate a comprehensive plan for the construction of bridges and tunnels across major bodies of water in Maryland. These projects would be financed and operated through toll funding. The plan developed by the SRC was ratified by the United States Congress in 1938 under its regulatory powers over navigable waterways. The plan became known as Maryland’s Primary Bridge Program and provided, among other projects, for the construction of a bridge across the Susquehanna River parallel to the overtaxed double-decker structure. Construction of this new span, which was designed by the J. E. Greiner Company, began in February 1939 and was completed at a cost of $4.5 million.

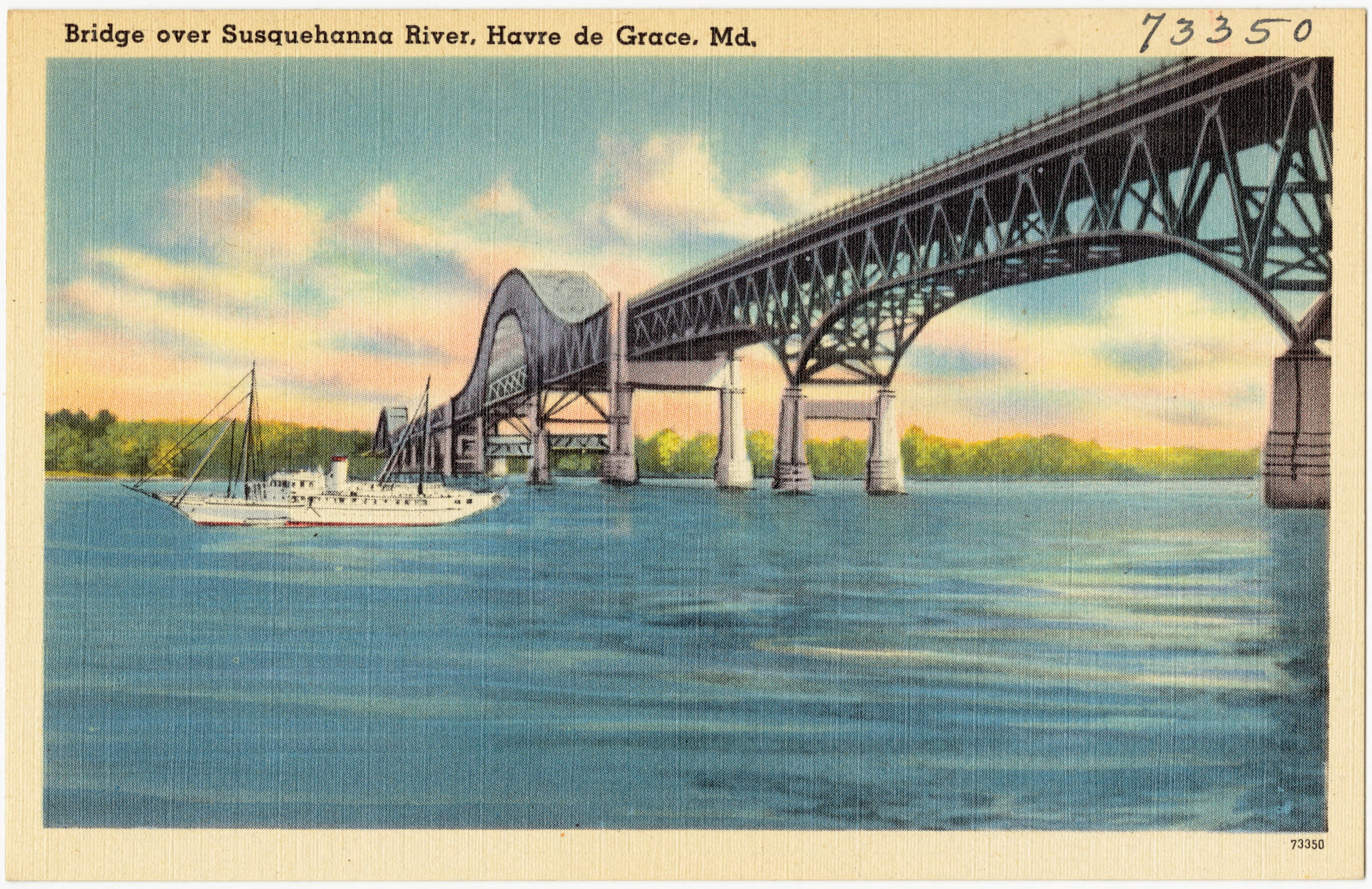
Postcard image c.1940s

== Operations ==
The bridge, named the Susquehanna River Toll Bridge, opened to traffic on August 28, 1940. The obsolete double-decker bridge was later demolished (there was an effort to keep it for local traffic, but then its steel was taken for the war effort). The first toll collectors at the bridge were all men; this changed as World War II drew men to military service and women took over traditionally male-dominated jobs.

Exact-change lanes were a novelty in toll collection when they were installed at the bridge in 1958. Their contribution to efficient toll collection was overshadowed in 1976 with the introduction of AVI (Automatic Vehicle Identification) decals. AVI works on the same principle as automated checkouts at retail stores, and the decal itself looks like a large universal-product code symbol commonly found on many items.

The bridge was renamed after Thomas J. Hatem died in 1985 at age 59; the official renaming took place in May 1986.

In 1991, a one-way toll collection system was introduced, and the $8.00 toll is now collected in the eastbound direction only. The barcode decal, for $10, is no longer issued. Motorists may purchase the Thomas Hatem Bridge Plan for a Maryland E-ZPass. This plan costs $20 for 12 months' unlimited use. In April 2019, MDTA announced that the bridge would become a cashless toll facility by October 2019, with drivers not equipped with E-ZPass paying their tolls using video tolling. Cashless tolling began on the bridge on October 16, 2019.

In 2012, Harford Transit introduced bus service across the bridge, linking Havre de Grace and Perryville.

Bicycles were long prohibited on the bridge, which lacks a safe shoulder. On July 1, 2016, the bridge opened to bicyclists, along with lights to warn drivers about bicycles in the travel lanes. Initially, bicyclists were allowed to use the bridge all week long, with limited hours on weekdays, but since September 6, 2016, bicycle passage has been restricted to weekends, holidays, and other designated dates. Bicycle usage in the first two months was minimal, but Maryland officials said the change was unrelated.

== See also ==
- List of crossings of the Susquehanna River
- Millard E. Tydings Memorial Bridge
