= Benjamin M. Dever =

American politician (died 1942)

Member of the Maryland House of Delegates from the Harford County district
- In office 1924–1926 Serving with Robert R. Lawder, Charles A. McGaw, Mary E. W. Risteau

Personal details
- Died: April 20, 1942 (aged 72) Baltimore, Maryland, U.S.
- Resting place: Baker's Cemetery; Aberdeen, Maryland, U.S.
- Party: Democratic
- Spouse: Susan E. Carty (m. 1897)
- Children: 2
- Occupation: Politician; farmer

Benjamin M. Dever (died April 20, 1942) was an American politician from Maryland. He served as a member of the Maryland House of Delegates, representing Harford County, from 1924 to 1926.

== Early life ==
Benjamin M. Dever was born to Mary (née Arnold) and George V. Dever.

== Career ==
Dever was a Democrat. He served as a member of the Maryland House of Delegates, representing Harford County, from 1924 to 1926.

Dever worked as a farmer and cattle dealer in Perryman.

== Personal life ==
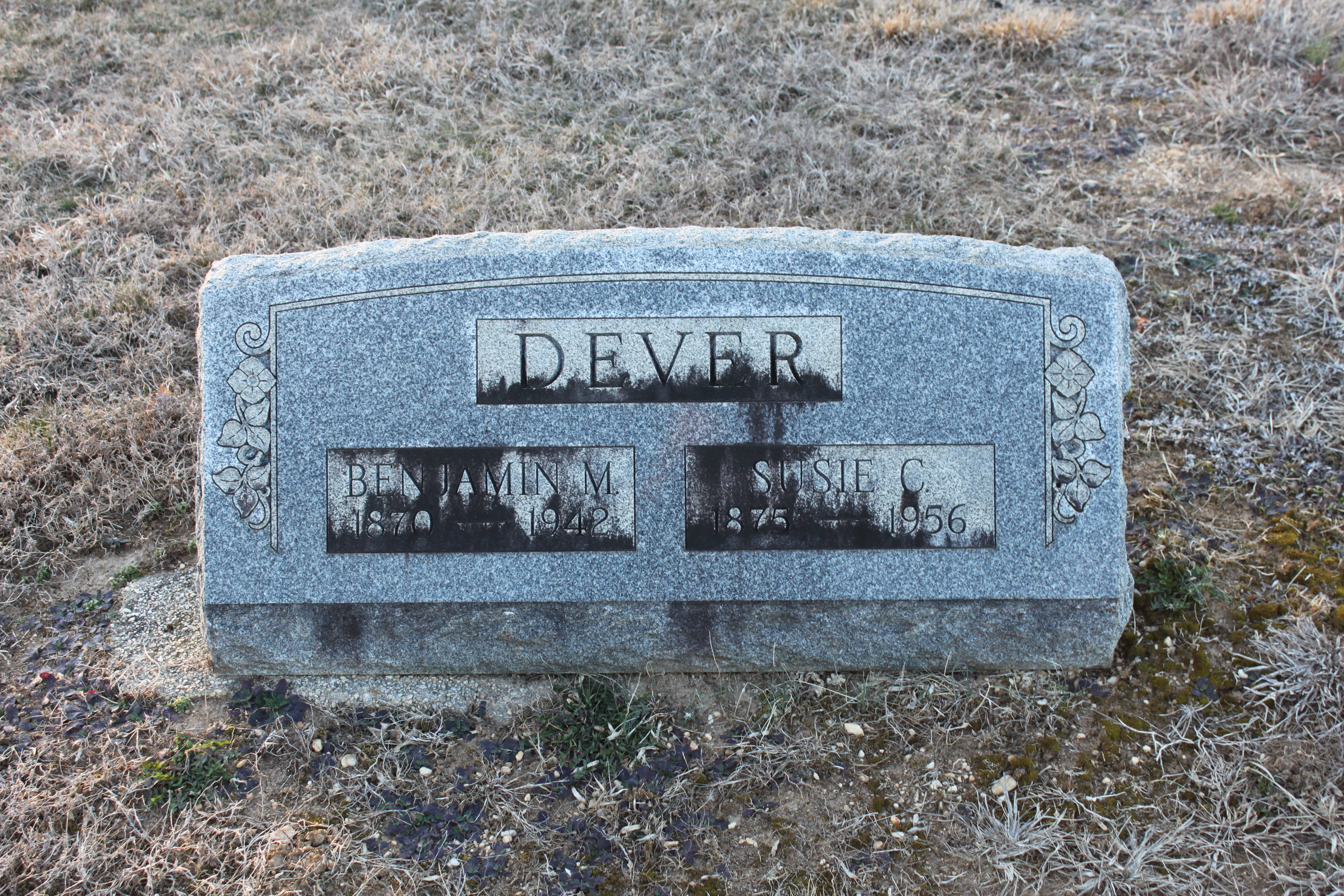
Grave of Dever at Baker Cemetery

Dever married Susan "Susie" E. Carty, granddaughter of George W. Baker and niece of William Benjamin Baker, on December 22, 1897. They had two children, Mrs. Joseph Ball and George.

Dever died on April 20, 1942, aged 72, in Baltimore. He was buried at Baker's Cemetery in Aberdeen, Maryland.
