= William C. Greer =

American politician (died 2001)

Member of the Maryland Senate from the Harford County district
- In office 1967–1974 Serving with William H. Cox Jr., Jon Harlan Livezey, R. Wilson Scarff, W. Dale Hess, Winton B. Osborne

Personal details
- Born: Churchville, Maryland, U.S.
- Died: August 6, 2001 (aged 77) Towson, Maryland, U.S.
- Resting place: Bel Air Memorial Gardens; Bel Air, Maryland, U.S.
- Party: Democratic
- Spouse: Mary Patricia Short
- Children: 8
- Education: University of Maryland

William C. Greer (died August 6, 2001) was an American politician from Maryland. He served as a member of the Maryland House of Delegates from 1967 to 1974.

== Early life ==
William C. Greer was born in Churchville, Maryland, to Annie Ethel (née Osborne) and Grover Cleveland Greer. He graduated from Bel Air High School, Mercersburg Academy and the University of Maryland. He played football with the Maryland Terrapins under Bear Bryant. He won the MacDonald Trophy. He was also part of the boxing and track teams.

== Career ==
Greer served as a member of the Maryland House of Delegates, representing Harford County, from 1967 to 1974.

Greer owned Greer Transportation Company in Bel Air, Maryland. He also worked for the Maryland Department of Natural Resources.

== Personal life ==
Greer married Mary Patricia Short. They had four sons and four daughters, William C. Jr., Michael, Timothy, John, Betsy, Patty, Marianne, Peggy. In retirement, Greer moved to Lancaster County, Pennsylvania. Greer founded a semi-pro football team and a Little League Team. He helped develop the Fair Hill Equestrian Center.

Greer died on August 6, 2001, at the age of 77, at St. Joseph's Hospital in Towson, Maryland. He was buried at Bel Air Memorial Gardens.
