= J. Rush Baldwin =

American politician

Member of the Maryland House of Delegates from the Harford County district
- In office 1947–1954 Serving with Earle R. Burkins, James J. DeRan Jr., William S. James, James McLean, A. Freeborn Brown, Mary E. W. Risteau
- Preceded by: John E. Clark

Personal details
- Party: Democratic

J. Rush Baldwin was an American politician from Maryland. He served as a member of the Maryland House of Delegates, representing Harford County, from 1947 to 1954.

== Career ==
Baldwin was a Democrat. Baldwin was appointed to succeed John E. Clark as a member of the Maryland House of Delegates after Clark resigned in 1947. Baldwin represented Harford County in the House of Delegates from 1947 to 1954.
