= Charles Stanley Blair =

American judge (1927–1980)

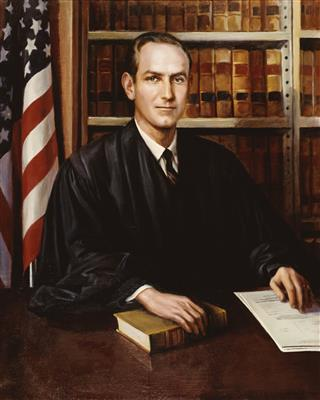

Judge of the United States District Court for the District of Maryland
- In office July 29, 1971 – April 20, 1980
- Appointed by: Richard Nixon
- Preceded by: Seat established by 84 Stat. 294
- Succeeded by: Norman Park Ramsey

Member of the Maryland House of Delegates from the Harford County district
- In office 1963–1966 Serving with R. Wilson Scarff, W. Dale Hess, John W. Hardwicke

Personal details
- Born: Charles Stanley Blair; December 20, 1927 Kingsville, Maryland, U.S.
- Died: April 20, 1980 (aged 52) Fallston, Maryland, U.S.
- Party: Republican
- Education: University of Maryland, College Park (BS); University of Maryland (LLB)

Charles Stanley Blair (December 20, 1927 – April 20, 1980) was a United States district judge of the United States District Court for the District of Maryland.

== Early life ==
Born in Kingsville, Maryland, Blair was in the United States Maritime Service from 1945 to 1947, and then received a Bachelor of Science degree from the University of Maryland, College Park in 1951 and a Bachelor of Laws from the University of Maryland School of Law in 1953.

== Career ==
Blair served in the United States Army from 1953 to 1956, achieving the rank of captain. He was in private practice in Bel Air, Maryland from 1961 to 1969, and was a member of the Maryland House of Delegates from 1963 to 1967. He was the Maryland Secretary of State from 1967 to 1969, and was chief of staff to the vice president of the United States, Spiro Agnew, from 1969 to 1970. Blair ran an unsuccessful campaign for Governor of the State of Maryland in 1970. He was a Republican.

== Federal judicial service ==
On July 14, 1971, Blair was nominated by President Richard Nixon to a new seat on the United States District Court for the District of Maryland created by 84 Stat. 294. He was confirmed by the United States Senate on July 29, 1971, and received his commission the same day. Blair served in that capacity until his death of an apparent heart attack on April 20, 1980, in Fallston, Maryland.

== Sources ==
- Maryland gubernatorial elections

Political offices
Preceded by Lloyd Lewis Simpkins	Secretary of State of Maryland; 1967–1969	Succeeded by Blair Lee III
Party political offices
Preceded by Rogers Morton	Republican nominee for Governor of Maryland; 1970	Succeeded by Louise Gore
Legal offices
Preceded by Seat established by 84 Stat. 294	Judge of the United States District Court for the District of Maryland; 1971–1980	Succeeded by Norman Park Ramsey
