= John W. Hardwicke =

American politician and judge (1927–2009)

Member of the Maryland House of Delegates from the Harford County district
- In office 1955–1970 Serving with C. Stanley Blair, W. Dale Hess, R. Wilson Scarff

Personal details
- Born: John Webster Hardwicke; April 10, 1927 Winston-Salem, North Carolina, U.S.
- Died: December 24, 2009 (aged 82) Havre de Grace, Maryland, U.S.
- Party: Republican
- Spouse: Mary Bunker
- Children: 6
- Education: University of North Carolina (BA); George Washington University School of Law (LLB)
- Occupation: Politician; educator; judge; lawyer

John Webster Hardwicke (April 10, 1927 – December 24, 2009) was an American politician, educator, lawyer and judge from Maryland. He served in the Maryland House of Delegates, representing Harford County, from 1963 to 1966.

== Early life ==
John Webster Hardwicke was born on April 10, 1927, in Winston-Salem, North Carolina. He attended public schools in Winston-Salem. He graduated from the University of North Carolina with a Bachelor of Arts in 1950. He graduated from George Washington University Law School with a Bachelor of Laws in 1953. He was admitted to the bar in 1953.

== Career ==
Hardwicke was a lecturer in law at Mount Vernon School of Law from 1955 to 1960. He was an instructor in law at Johns Hopkins University starting in 1955. He practiced law in Baltimore and Harford County until 1989.

Hardwicke was a Republican. Hess served in the Maryland House of Delegates, representing Harford County, from 1963 to 1966. He was a delegate to the Constitutional Convention of Maryland in 1967. In 1973, Hardwicke ran for Congress, but lost to Robert Bauman.

He was a member of the Harford County Council and served as president from 1978 to 1990. He was chief administrative law judge of the Maryland Office of Administrative Hearings from 1991 to 2002, after appointment by Governor William Donald Schaefer. He was the first administrative law judge of Maryland. He was the co-author of Business Law with Robert Emerson.

== Personal life ==
Hardwicke married Mary Bunker. They had six children. Later in life, he lived in Darlington, Maryland.

Hardwicke died on December 24, 2009, at Harford Memorial Hospital in Havre de Grace, Maryland.
