= Robert Seneca =

American politician (died 1931)

Member of the Maryland House of Delegates from the Harford County district
- In office 1896–1900 Serving with T. Littleton Hanway, John L. G. Lee, William M. Whiteford, Herman W. Hanson

Personal details
- Born: Robert J. Seneca; 1846/1847 Havre de Grace, Maryland, U.S.
- Died: March 31, 1931 (aged 85) Havre de Grace, Maryland, U.S.
- Resting place: Angel Hill Cemetery; Havre de Grace, Maryland, U.S.
- Party: Democratic
- Occupation: Politician; merchant

Robert J. Seneca (1846/1847 – March 31, 1931) was an American politician and merchant from Maryland. He served as a member of the Maryland House of Delegates, representing Harford County from 1896 to 1900.

== Early life ==
Robert J. Seneca was born around 1846/1847 in Havre de Grace, Maryland, to Mary and Dorus Seneca. His father worked in the mercantile industry and worked for the Philadelphia, Wilmington and Baltimore Railroad.

== Career ==
Seneca ran a mercantile business and later bought and sold fish and ducks.

Seneca served as mayor of Havre de Grace from 1889 to 1891. He served as city councilman of Havre de Grace from 1879 to 1881 and from 1890 to 1891 and in 1895. He also served as city treasurer in Havre de Grace for two years.

Seneca was a Democrat. He served as a member of the Maryland House of Delegates, representing Harford County from 1896 to 1900.

== Personal life ==
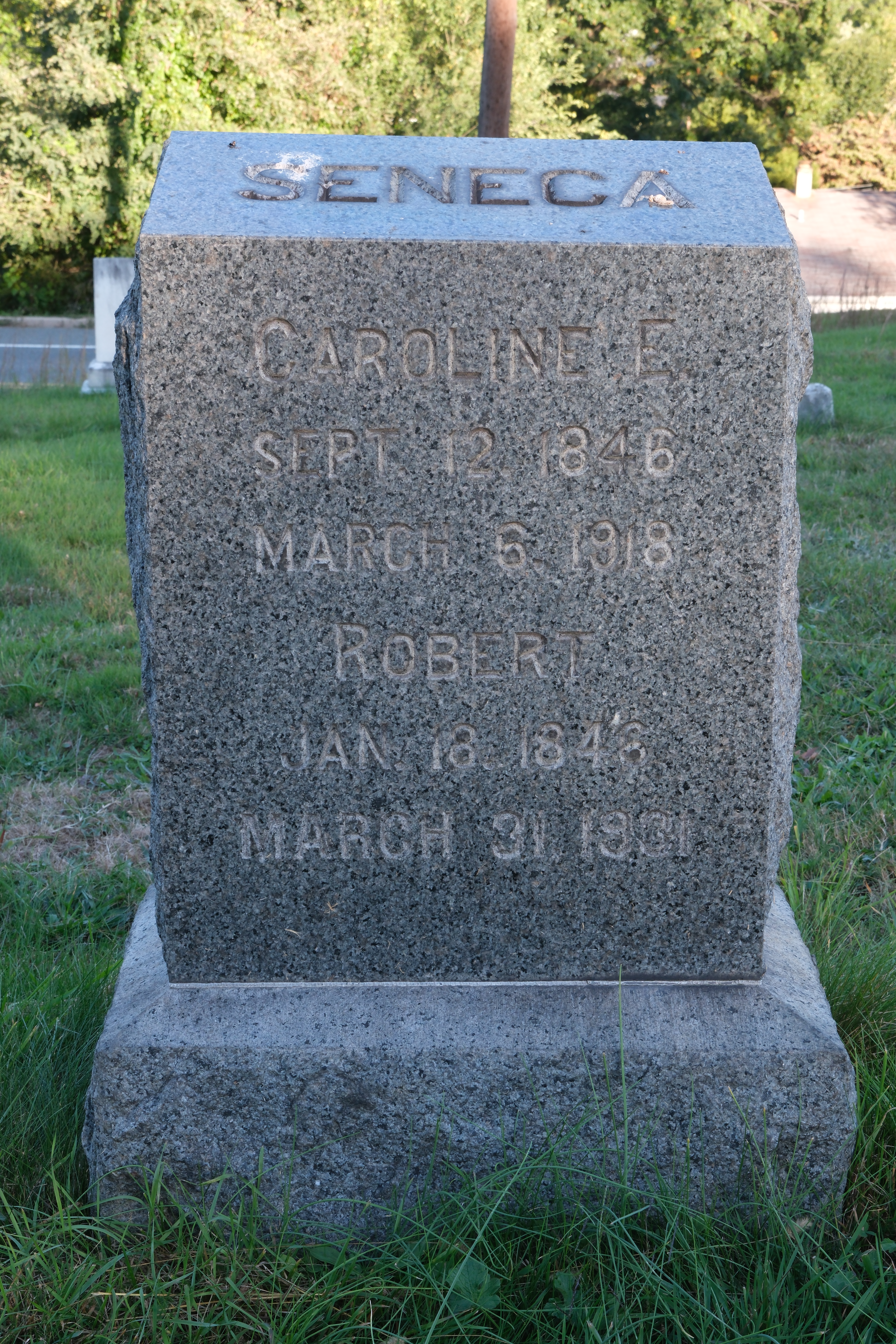
Grave of Robert Seneca at Angel Hill Cemetery

Seneca died on March 31, 1931, at the age of 85, in Havre de Grace. He was buried at Angel Hill Cemetery.
