= Harold E. Cobourn =

American politician and lawyer (died 1938)

Member of the Maryland House of Delegates from the Cecil County district
- In office 1935–1938
- Preceded by: Wallace Williams
- Succeeded by: Cecil Clyde Squier

Personal details
- Died: June 5, 1938 (aged 44) Elkton, Maryland, U.S.
- Resting place: Mount Erin Cemetery
- Party: Democratic
- Spouse: Katherine Fahey
- Relatives: Frederick Lee Cobourn (brother)
- Education: University of Maryland School of Law
- Occupation: Politician; lawyer

Harold E. Cobourn (died June 5, 1938) was an American politician and lawyer from Maryland. He served as a member of the Maryland Senate from 1935 to his death in 1938.

== Early life ==
Harold E. Cobourn was born to Lydia and Hiram Cobourn. He graduated from the University of Maryland School of Law. His brother was Frederick Lee Cobourn.

== Career ==
After graduating, Cobourn started practicing law in Perryville. Cobourn was one of three attorneys who unsuccessful defended state labor commissioner Harry T. Phoebus.

Cobourn was a Democrat. He served as a member of the Maryland Senate from 1935 to his death in 1938. In 1936, he worked as an investigator for the states road commission. In 1938, he announced that he was running to be an associate judge of the second judicial circuit court, challenging Thomas J. Keating.

== Personal life ==
Cobourn married Katherine Fahey, niece of Havre de Grace mayor Michael H. Fahey. He was friends with Governor Harry Nice. In 1936, Cobourn was adopted by an Indian tribe of the Elk River Reservation and was given the name "Flying Eagle".

Cobourn died from a brain hemorrhage on June 5, 1938, at the age of 44, after getting in an automobile crash during his campaign tour near North East. He died at Union Hospital in Elkton. He was buried at Mount Erin Cemetery.
