= Winton B. Osborne =

American politician (died 1998)

Member of the Maryland House of Delegates from the Harford district
- In office 1967–1970 Serving with William C. Greer, W. Dale Hess, R. Wilson Scarff

Personal details
- Born: 1929-1930
- Died: May 25, 1998 (aged 68) Baltimore, Maryland, U.S.
- Party: Democratic
- Spouse: Rose Ella Hughes
- Children: 4
- Education: Baltimore Business College
- Occupation: Politician; businessman

Winton B. Osborne (died May 25, 1998) was an American politician and businessman from Maryland. He served in the Maryland House of Delegates, representing Harford County, from 1967 to 1970.

== Early life ==
Winton B. Osborne grew up on a farm on Rock Spring Road in Forest Hill, Maryland. He graduated from Bel Air High School in 1946 and Baltimore Business College in 1948.

== Career ==
Osborne established the Harford Sod and Excavating Company Inc. in 1955. The business closed in 1994.

Osborne was a Democrat. He served in the Maryland House of Delegates, representing Harford County, from 1967 to 1970. In 1972, Osborne lost his bid for a seat on the Harford County Council.

== Personal life ==
Osborne married Rose Ella Hughes. They had four daughters, Linda Gail, Deborah Jean, Patricia Ann and Diane Cheryl.

Osborne died, at the age of 68, from drowning in Baltimore's Inner Harbor on May 25, 1998.
