= Jon Harlan Livezey =

American politician and lawyer (1938–2025)

Member of the Maryland House of Delegates from the Harford County district
- In office 1971–1974 Serving with William H. Cox Jr., William C. Greer, R. Wilson Scarff

Personal details
- Born: December 8, 1938 Baltimore, Maryland, U.S.
- Died: July 29, 2025 (aged 86) Elkton, Maryland, U.S.
- Resting place: Baker Cemetery; Aberdeen, Maryland, U.S.
- Party: Republican
- Spouse: Mary Lynne Thompson (m. 1978)
- Education: Johns Hopkins University (BA); University of Maryland School of Law (LLB)
- Occupation: Politician; lawyer

Jon Harlan Livezey (December 8, 1938 – July 29, 2025) was an American politician and lawyer from Maryland. He served as a member of the Maryland House of Delegates, representing Harford County, from 1971 to 1974.

== Early life ==
Jon Harlan Livezey was born on December 8, 1938, in Baltimore, Maryland, to Isabel (née Harlan) and Henry Kenneth Livezey. He attended Harford County Public Schools and graduated from Aberdeen High School in 1956. He graduated from Johns Hopkins University with a Bachelor of Arts in 1960 and was a member of the Army Reserve Officers' Training Corps. He graduated from the University of Maryland School of Law with a Bachelor of Laws in 1963. He was admitted to the bar in Maryland in 1963.

== Career ==
Livezey served in the United States Army. He worked as an attorney and was counsel to the Harford County Board of Election Supervisors from 1967 to 1969.

Livezey was a Republican. He served in the Maryland House of Delegates, representing Harford County, from 1971 to 1974.

Livezey served as president of the Harford County Historical Society from 1970 to 1972. Livezey served as the president of the Harford County Bar Association in 1988. He retired as a lawyer in 2019.

== Personal life and death ==
Livezey married Mary Lynne Thompson of Glen Arm, Maryland, on May 29, 1978. He lived in Aberdeen. He was a member of Grove Presbyterian Church.

Livezey died at Union Hospital in Elkton, on July 29, 2025, at the age of 86. He was buried in Baker Cemetery in Aberdeen.
