= James J. DeRan Jr. =

American politician (1906–1986)

Member of the Maryland House of Delegates from the Harford County district
- In office 1943–1950 Serving with Earle R. Burkins, John E. Clark, Leo M. Moore, Lena L. Moore, William S. James, J. Rush Baldwin, James McLean
- Preceded by: Marshall T. Heaps

Personal details
- Born: October 5, 1906
- Died: February 28, 1986 (aged 79) Havre de Grace, Maryland, U.S.
- Party: Democratic
- Spouse: Helen Harry (died 1981)
- Children: 5
- Education: University of Maryland
- Occupation: Politician; real estate businessman

James J. DeRan Jr. (October 5, 1906 – February 28, 1986) was an American politician from Maryland. He served as a member of the Maryland House of Delegates, representing Harford County, from 1943 to 1950.

== Early life ==
James J. DeRan Jr. was born on October 5, 1906, at Clover Lick, West Virginia or Woodstock, Virginia, sources differ. He moved to Pylesville, Maryland, as a child. His father was a Harford County commissioner in the 1930s. DeRan graduated Highland High School in Street, Maryland. He graduated from the University of Maryland with a bachelor's degree in 1928. While at the University of Maryland, he played lacrosse.

== Career ==
DeRan was a Democrat. DeRan served as a member of the Maryland House of Delegates, representing Harford County, from 1943 to 1950.

DeRan worked in the real estate and insurance business.

== Personal life ==
DeRan married Helen Harry. They had four sons and one daughter, James J. III, C. Harry, John P., David H. and Sara A. His wife died in 1981. DeRan was a member and elder at Highland Presbyterian Church.

DeRan died of influenza on February 28, 1986, at Citizens Nursing Home in Havre de Grace, Maryland.
