= Howard S. O'Neill =

American politician and lawyer (1883–1966)

Member of the Maryland Senate
- In office 1947–1950
- Preceded by: J. Wilmer Cronin
- Succeeded by: D. Paul McNabb
- Constituency: Harford County

Personal details
- Born: August 24, 1883 Baltimore, Maryland, U.S.
- Died: June 1, 1966 (aged 82) Bel Air, Maryland, U.S.
- Resting place: Loudon Park Cemetery; Baltimore, Maryland, U.S.
- Party: Republican
- Spouse: M. Madeleine Robinson (m. 1913)
- Children: 8
- Education: Baltimore Law School
- Occupation: Politician; businessman; lawyer

Howard S. O'Neill (August 24, 1883 – June 1, 1966) was an American politician and lawyer from Maryland. He served in the Maryland Senate from 1947 to 1950.

== Early life and education ==
Howard S. O'Neill was born on August 24, 1883, in Baltimore, Maryland. Later in life, O'Neill studied law at Baltimore Law School for two years and was admitted to the bar in 1944.

== Career ==
O'Neill moved to Harford County in 1903 and became secretary to the county school board. O'Neill worked with the Bel Air Electric Company and the Harford Toll Road. In 1918, he helped found the Motor Sales Company in Bel Air. After the Wall Street Crash of 1929, O'Neill helped reorganize the Farmers and Merchants National Bank. He was appointed cashier of the First National Bank of Harford County in 1938.

After getting admitted to the bar, O'Neill worked as an attorney in Bel Air. O'Neill worked in the firm O'Neill, O'Neill, O'Neill with his sons Harry St. A. and James.

O'Neill was a Republican. O'Neill ran for clerk of the Circuit Court of Harford County in 1938 and 1942. He served as a member of the Maryland Senate, representing Harford County, from 1947 to 1950. He was defeated in re-election in 1950 by D. Paul McNabb. He served as treasurer of the Republican State Central Committee for Harford County from 1947 to his death in 1966.

== Personal life ==
O'Neill married M. Madeleine Robinson, daughter of Maryland attorney general Thomas Hall Robinson, on August 1, 1913. They had five sons and three daughters, John H., Harry St. A., James, Daniel D., Thomas H. R., Elizabeth, Peggy and Nancy. His son John H. was a member of the Harford County board of commissioners. From 1913 until his death, O'Neill lived at 14 North Williams Street in Bel Air.

O'Neill died on June 1, 1966, at his home in Bel Air. He was buried at Loudon Park Cemetery in Baltimore.
