= T. Littleton Hanway =

American politician and merchant (1846–1921)

Member of the Maryland House of Delegates from the Harford County district
- In office 1896–1900 Serving with John L. G. Lee, Robert Seneca, William M. Whiteford, Herman W. Hanson

Personal details
- Born: c. 1846 Aberdeen, Maryland, U.S.
- Died: January 17, 1921 (aged 74–75) Aberdeen, Maryland, U.S.
- Resting place: Grove Cemetery; Aberdeen, Maryland, U.S.
- Party: Democratic
- Spouse: Elizabeth Morgan (m. 1875)
- Children: 5
- Occupation: Politician; merchant

T. Littleton Hanway (c. 1846 – January 17, 1921) was an American politician and merchant from Maryland. He served as a member of the Maryland House of Delegates, representing Harford County from 1896 to 1900.

== Early life ==
T. Littleton Hanway was born in about 1846 at Hall's Cross Roads in Aberdeen, Maryland, to Sarah Ann (née Keen) and Thomas Hanway. His father was a farmer and owned a general store. Hanway studied at public schools and Bel Air Academy.

== Career ==
At the age of 20, Hanway moved to Wilmington, Delaware. He worked as a clerk in the leather department of H. S. McCombs's business in Wilmington. He then transferred to Philadelphia and worked there for 18 months. He then worked as a clerk at a store in Michaelville, Harford County for two years. In 1870, he went to Aberdeen and bought Jacob J. Gallion's store. His mercantile career in Aberdeen concluded on February 6, 1918, with a fire. At that time, Hanway owned a general store with J. Harry Gibson called Hanway & Gibson, but it was destroyed in the fire. Later that year, Hanway sued Philadelphia, Baltimore and Washington Railroad for running over the fire department's water hose being used to quench the fire.

Hanway was a Democrat. He served as postmaster of Aberdeen during President Grover Cleveland's first administration. He served as a member of the Maryland House of Delegates, representing Harford County from 1896 to 1900. Hanway ran for the Democratic nomination for the Maryland Senate in 1901 and 1905.

Hanway served as president, vice president and director of the Aberdeen First National Bank and secretary of the Aberdeen Land and Improvement Company. He was a director of the Aberdeen Canning Company.

== Personal life ==
Hanway married Elizabeth "Libbie" A. Morgan in January 1875. They had five children, Stanley M., Caroll, Walter, Thomas and Lillian Rouse. Hanway was a member and trustee of Grove Presbyterian Church.

Hanway died on January 17, 1921, at his home in Aberdeen. He was buried at Grove Cemetery.
