= Earle R. Burkins =

American politician (died 1949)

Member of the Maryland House of Delegates from the Harford County district
- In office 1939 – September 16, 1949 Serving with John E. Clark, Marshall T. Heaps, Leo M. Moore, James J. DeRan Jr., Lena L. Moore, William S. James, J. Rush Baldwin
- Succeeded by: James McLean

Personal details
- Born: Castleton, Maryland, U.S.
- Died: September 16, 1949 (aged 57) Patuxent River, Maryland, U.S.
- Resting place: Bel Air Memorial Gardens; Bel Air, Maryland, U.S.
- Party: Democratic
- Spouse: Mosena Warren
- Occupation: Politician

Earle R. Burkins (died September 16, 1949) was an American politician from Maryland. He served as a member of the Maryland House of Delegates, representing Harford County, from 1939 to 1949.

== Early life ==
Earle R. Burkins was born in Castleton, Maryland, to William A. Burkins.

== Career ==
Burkins served with the 29th Infantry Division during World War I.

Burkins was a Democrat. Burkins served as a member of the Maryland House of Delegates, representing Harford County, from 1939 to his death in 1949. Burkins served as mayor of Bel Air, Maryland, for 14 years. Burkins served as chair of the town commission of Bel Air from 1940 to 1946. He served as an inspector of the State Racing Commission.

Burkins served as a commander of Harford Post No. 39 of the American Legion.

== Personal life ==
Burkins married Mosena Warren.

Burkins died on September 16, 1949, at the age of 57, of a heart attack while fishing on the Patuxent River. He was buried at Bel Air Memorial Gardens.
