= Charles M. Moore =

American politician

Member of the Maryland House of Delegates from the Harford County district
- In office 1955–1962 Serving with Thomas J. Hatem, W. Dale Hess, Joseph D. Tydings, Morton H. Getz, W. Lester Davis

Personal details
- Born: September 1, 1923 Havre de Grace, Maryland, US
- Died: February 1, 1991 (aged 67) Elkton, Maryland, US
- Party: Democratic
- Parents: Leo M. Moore (father); Lena L. Moore (mother)
- Relatives: Michael Moore (grandfather)
- Occupation: Politician

Charles Michael Moore (1923–1991) was an American politician from Maryland. He served as a member of the Maryland House of Delegates, representing Harford County, from 1955 to 1962.

== Early life ==
Moore was born on September 1, 1923, in Havre de Grace, Maryland to Lena Lamm Moore and Leo M. Moore. His father was a member of the Maryland House of Delegates and was newspaper publisher of the Democratic Ledger. His grandfather, Michael Moore was also a member of the Maryland House of Delegates.

== Career ==
Moore served in the United States Army Air Forces in World War II and became a sergeant. He was discharged in December 1945.

Moore was a Democrat. He served as a member of the Maryland House of Delegates, representing Harford County, from 1955 to 1962.
