= Thomas J. Hatem =

American politician (1925–1985)

Member of the Maryland House of Delegates from the Harford County district
- In office 1955–1958 Serving with W. Dale Hess, Charles M. Moore, Joseph D. Tydings

Personal details
- Born: 1925 Havre de Grace, Maryland, U.S.
- Died: March 19, 1985 (aged 59) Baltimore, Maryland, U.S.
- Resting place: Bel Air Memorial Gardens; Bel Air, Maryland, U.S.
- Party: Democratic
- Spouse: Claire Catherine Bernosky
- Education: University of Maryland School of Law
- Occupation: Politician; lawyer
- Known for: namesake of Thomas J. Hatem Memorial Bridge

Thomas J. Hatem (1925 – March 19, 1985) was an American politician from Maryland. He served as a member of the Maryland House of Delegates, representing Harford County, from 1955 to 1958. He is the namesake of the Thomas J. Hatem Memorial Bridge.

== Early life ==
Thomas J. Hatem was born in 1925 in Havre de Grace, Maryland. He graduated from Havre de Grace High School in 1943. He graduated from the University of Maryland School of Law in 1952. He was admitted to the bar in 1952.

== Career ==
Hatem served as a state athletic commissioner and as chairman of the State Accident Fund. He served two terms on the state's Department of Employment Security's Board of Appeals. He also served on the Interstate Advisory Commission on the Susquehanna River.

Hatem was a Democrat. He served as a member of the Maryland House of Delegates, representing Harford County, from 1955 to 1958. He served with Joseph D. Tydings and W. Dale Hess. The trio were referred to as "whiz kids" since they were all under 30 years old. Hatem lost the primary election for the Maryland Senate to William S. James. Following his loss to James, Hatem served as city attorney in Havre de Grace.

In 1969, Hatem was appointed to the Board of County Commissioners. He resigned in 1970 when he was appointed by Governor Marvin Mandel as state insurance commissioner. In 1974, Hatem ran for Maryland's 1st congressional district seat in U.S. Congress, but lost to Robert Bauman. He was re-appointed as state insurance commissioner. He served until 1976. In 1976, acting Governor Blair Lee III appointed Hatem to a six-year term on the Public Service Commission. He did not seek reappointment in 1982.

In 1983 and 1984, Hatem served as a part-time lobbyist for Harford County in Annapolis. In 1984, Hatem campaigned to become a circuit judge, but he was passed over.

Hatem practiced law in Havre de Grace and Bel Air. He worked with Johnny Kelly. He was the head of the Harford County Housing Authority.

== Personal life ==
Hatem married Claire Catherine Bernosky.

Hatem died of leukemia on March 19, 1985, at the age of 59, at Johns Hopkins Hospital in Baltimore. He was buried at Bel Air Memorial Gardens in Bel Air.

== Legacy ==
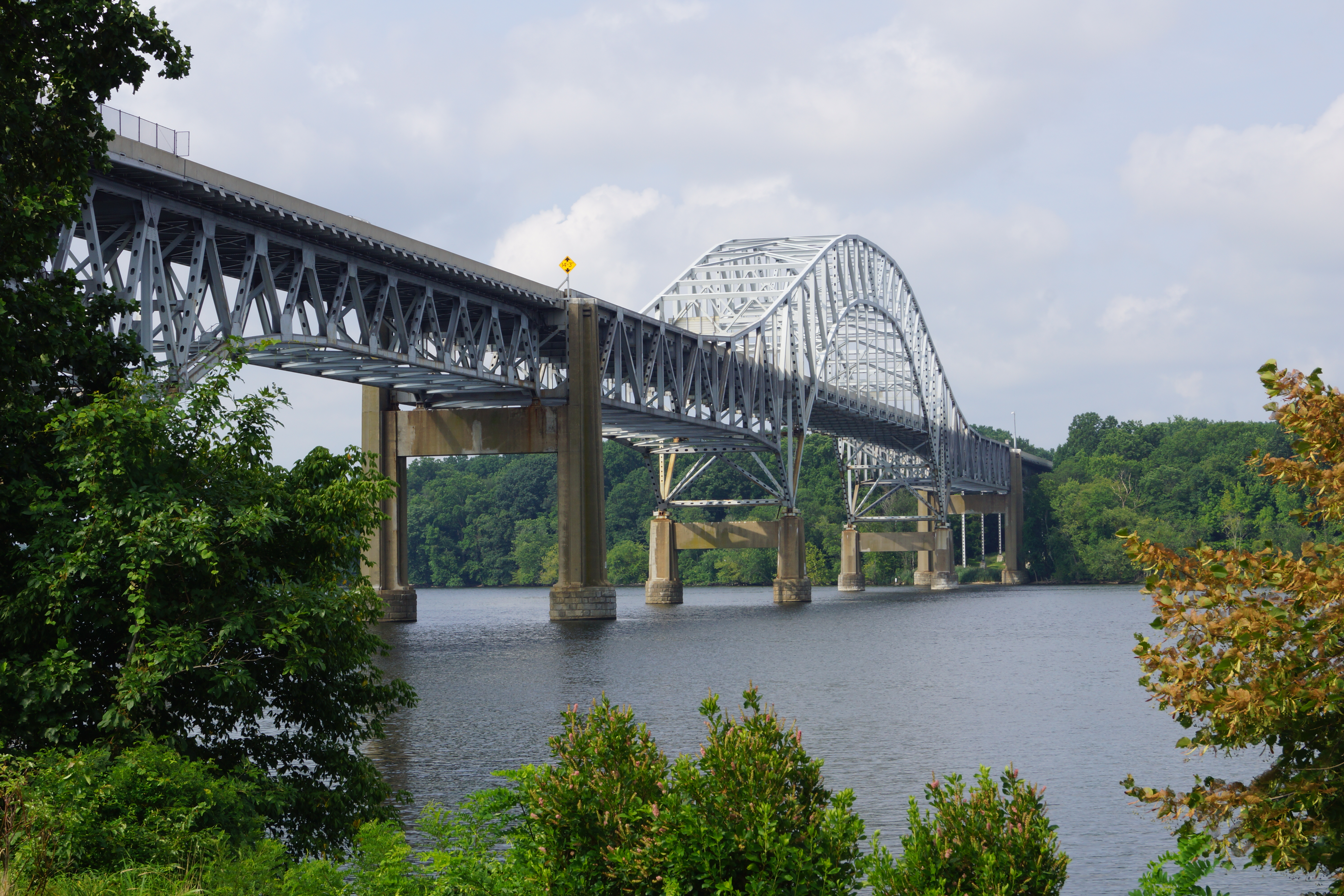
Thomas J. Hatem Memorial Bridge in 2015

The Thomas J. Hatem Memorial Bridge, formerly Susquehanna River Toll Bridge, on U.S. Route 40 was posthumously named after Hatem in 1986.

Hatem was added to the Havre de Grace High School Hall of Fame in 2016.
