= Charles A. McGaw =

American politician (1846–1926)

Member of the Maryland House of Delegates from the Harford County district
- In office 1924–1926 Serving with Benjamin M. Dever, Robert R. Lawder, Mary E. W. Risteau

Personal details
- Born: January 6, 1846 Bush, Harford County, Maryland, U.S.
- Died: May 3, 1926 (aged 80) Abingdon, Maryland, U.S.
- Resting place: Abingdon Methodist Episcopal Church cemetery
- Party: Democratic
- Spouse: Ella Jane Griffin
- Occupation: Politician; canner; farmer; hotelier

Charles A. McGaw (January 6, 1846 – May 3, 1926) was an American politician from Maryland. He served as a member of the Maryland House of Delegates, representing Harford County, from 1924 to 1926.

== Early life ==
Charles A. McGaw was born on January 6, 1846, at the Old Bush Tavern, in Bush, Harford County, Maryland, to Elizabeth Courtney (née Henson) and Robert McGaw Jr. His father was proprietor of Eagle Hotel and served as sheriff. He attended local schools and Bel Air Academy.

== Career ==
McGaw worked as a canner in Belcamp for 11 years.

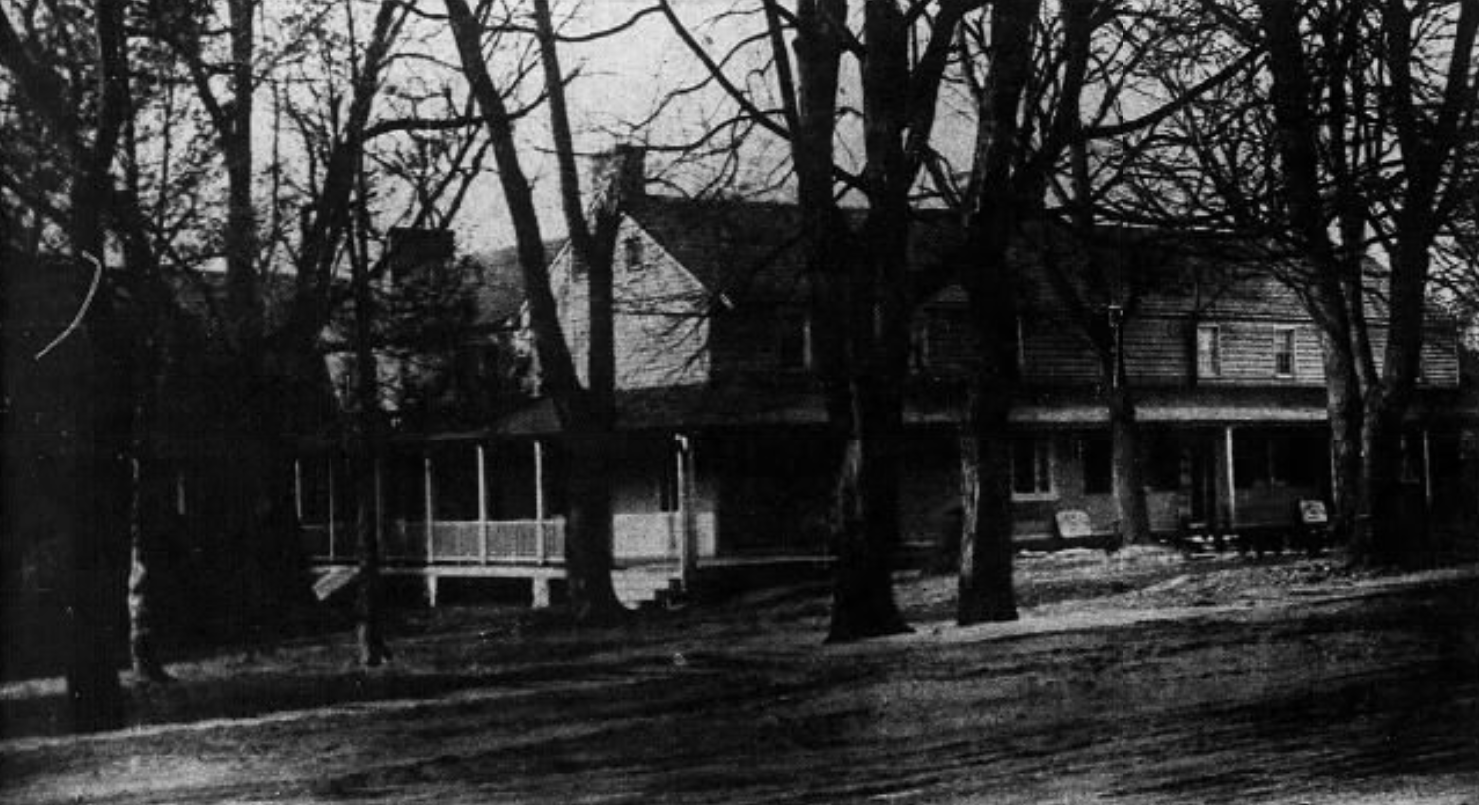
Eagle Hotel in 1917

McGaw served as the sheriff of Harford County for two years starting in November 1889. He had a general store in Abingdon. He worked at a canning factory in Salem County, New Jersey, for three years. McGaw then farmed in Abingdon. On May 1, 1897, McGaw started operating the Rouse House in Bel Air. He renamed the hotel the Eagle Hotel (later it was renamed the Country Club Inn). He sold the hotel in October 1906.

McGaw was a Democrat. He served as a member of the Maryland House of Delegates, representing Harford County, from 1924 to 1926.

After retiring from hoteling, McGaw moved to Abingdon and worked in trucking.

== Personal life ==
McGaw married Ella Jane Griffin, daughter of William E. Griffin.

McGaw died on May 3, 1926, at his home in Abingdon. He was buried in the Abingdon Methodist Episcopal Church cemetery.
