= D. Paul McNabb =

American politician (died 1963)

Member of the Maryland Senate
- In office 1951 – November 1953
- Preceded by: Howard S. O'Neill
- Succeeded by: Robert R. Lawder
- Constituency: Harford County

Personal details
- Born: Harford County, Maryland, U.S.
- Died: December 7, 1963 (aged 68) Pylesville, Maryland, U.S.
- Resting place: Broad Creek Cemetery near Dublin, Maryland, U.S.
- Party: Democratic
- Spouse: Ruth Ellicott Somers
- Occupation: Politician; lawyer; judge

D. Paul McNabb (died December 7, 1963) was an American politician, lawyer and judge from Maryland. He served as a member of the Maryland Senate from 1951 to 1953.

== Early life and education ==
D. Paul McNabb was born in Harford County, Maryland. He was educated at public schools in Harford County and graduated from Delta High School in Delta, Pennsylvania. He was admitted to the bar in 1926.

== Career ==
McNabb was appointed deputy clerk of the Harford County Circuit Court and served in that role for nine years. In 1934, he was elected state's attorney for Harford County. He served in that role for sixteen years. He practiced law with the firm McNabb and Clark.

He was a Democrat. He served as a member of the Maryland Senate, representing Harford County, from 1951 to November 1953, when he resigned. In November 1953, he was appointed as associate judge of the Third Judicial Court of Maryland. He was elected county commissioner of Harford County in 1958 and was re-elected in 1962.

== Personal life ==
McNabb married Ruth Ellicott Somers.

He died on December 7, 1963, at the age of 68, at North Harford High School in Pylesville, Maryland. He was buried at Broad Creek Cemetery near Dublin, Maryland.
