= David G. Harry =

American politician and farmer (1880–1955)

David Garfield Harry

Member of the Maryland Senate
- In office 1924–1927
- Preceded by: Millard E. Tydings
- Succeeded by: Abram G. Ensor
- Constituency: Harford County

Personal details
- Born: June 11, 1880 near Pylesville, Maryland, U.S.
- Died: December 12, 1955 (aged 75) Baltimore, Maryland, U.S.
- Resting place: Friends Cemetery; Fawn Grove, Pennsylvania, U.S.
- Party: Republican
- Spouse(s): Sarah Lanius (m. 1908; died 1947) Betty Meredith DeRan
- Children: 3
- Occupation: Politician; farmer

David Garfield Harry (June 11, 1880 – December 12, 1955) was an American politician and farmer. He served in the Maryland Senate from 1924 to 1927.

== Early life ==
David Garfield Harry was born on June 11, 1880, at Garfield farm near Pylesville, Maryland. He was the youngest of nine children. He attended Harford County Public Schools.

== Career ==
In 1922, Harry was called as a state representative by President Warren G. Harding for an agricultural conference. He was later selected by Governor Harry Nice as a state representative in a meeting to discuss dairy issues.

Harry was a Republican. Harry served in the Maryland Senate from 1924 to 1927. He was elected to succeed Millard E. Tydings. In 1946, Harry ran for the 2nd district congressional seat. He was defeated by Hugh Meade.

During World War II, Harry was a member of the War Price and Rationing Board in Bel Air. He worked as district manager of the Provident Mutual Insurance Company for 45 years. He was active in farm and cattle organizations. He served several terms in the Farm Credit Board of the Baltimore district. Harry was the first president of the Maryland State Dairymen's Association, serving from 1916 to 1924, and later served in the executive board. In 1935, Harry served in the Maryland Milk Control Commission. He also served as director of the Southern States Cooperative Inc., a purchasing and supply organization for farmers, for 31 years and served as president of the organization. Harry served as president of the Maryland Agricultural Society.

Harry owned two farms near Pylesville and bred Jersey cattle. He served as vice president and director of the Federal Land Bank of Baltimore and was the director of Harford County Bank. He served on the board of directors for 19 years.

== Personal life ==
Harry married Sarah Lanius of York County, Pennsylvania, in 1908. They had three children, Helen, David G. Jr. and J. Charles. His wife died on January 24, 1947. He married Betty Meredith DeRan. He had a stepdaughter, Mrs. Herbert Henning. Around 1951, Harry moved to 5918 Plainfield Avenue in Baltimore.

Harry died on December 12, 1955, at St. Agnes Hospital in Baltimore. He was buried at Friends Cemetery in Fawn Grove, Pennsylvania.
