= J. Wilmer Cronin =

American politician and lawyer (1896–1982)

President of the Board of Commissioners of Aberdeen, Maryland
- In office 1955–1956
- Preceded by: Clark D. Connellee
- Succeeded by: R. Lee Mitchell
- In office 1950–1952
- Preceded by: Frank E. Baker
- Succeeded by: Charles J. Kelly

Member of the Maryland Senate
- In office 1939–1946
- Preceded by: Mary Risteau
- Succeeded by: Howard S. O'Neill
- Constituency: Harford County

Member of the Maryland House of Delegates
- In office 1927–1930 Serving with Frederick Lee Cobourn, Marshall T. Heaps, Robert R. Lawder
- Constituency: Harford County

Personal details
- Born: October 14, 1896 Aberdeen, Maryland, U.S.
- Died: April 28, 1982 (aged 85) Havre de Grace, Maryland, U.S.
- Resting place: Churchville Presbyterian Church; Churchville, Maryland, U.S.
- Party: Democratic
- Spouse: Mary S. Ferrell (m. 1918; died 1972)
- Children: 3
- Education: Charlotte Hill Military Academy; University of Maryland School of Law
- Occupation: Politician; lawyer; newspaperman

J. Wilmer Cronin (October 14, 1896 – April 28, 1982) was an American politician, lawyer and newspaper publisher from Maryland. He served as a member of the Maryland House of Delegates from 1927 to 1930 and Maryland Senate from 1939 to 1946. He was the owner and publisher of The Harford Democrat.

== Early life ==
J. Wilmer Cronin was born on October 14, 1896, in Aberdeen, Maryland. He graduated from the first class of Aberdeen High School and graduated from the Charlotte Hill Military Academy. He took a job at First National Bank of Aberdeen. Cronin attended night classes at University of Maryland School of Law and graduated in 1919. He was admitted to the bar in 1919.

== Career ==
In 1919, Cronin and a partner bought The Harford Democrat and a few years later he bought out his partner. The paper would later be renamed The Harford Democrat and Aberdeen Enterprise. He worked as owner and publisher of The Harford Democrat for over 60 years.

Cronin was a Democrat. Cronin served as a member of the Maryland House of Delegates from 1927 to 1930. Cronin served as a member of the Maryland Senate from 1939 to 1946. While in the senate, he served as president of the Young Democrats of Maryland. He was a member of Harford County's Democratic State Central Committee.

Cronin served as town commissioner of Aberdeen. He served as president of the board of commissioners of Aberdeen from 1950 to 1952 and 1955 to 1956. He served as counsel to the town board of commissioners for over 20 years. He served as counsel to Harford County's board of commissioners and counsel for Harford County's planning commission for 15 years. In 1951, Cronin was president of the Harford County Bar Association.

Cronin was a charter member and president of the Aberdeen Lions Club. He also served as chairman of Harford County's Community Chest-Red Cross United Appeal.

== Personal life ==
Cronin married Mary S. Ferrell in 1918. They had two daughters and a son, Mary, Anne and William R. His wife died in 1972.

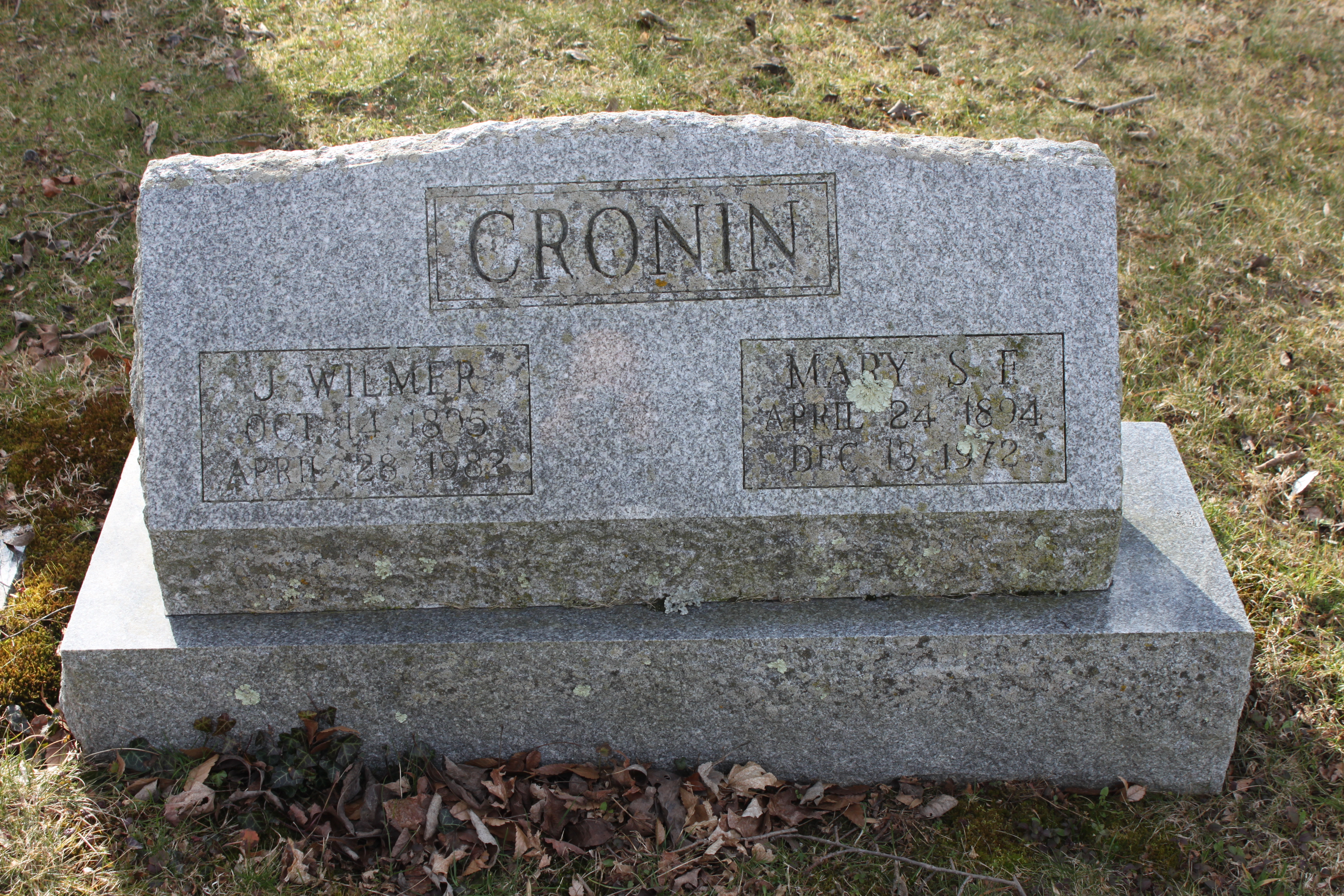
Grave of Cronin and his wife in Churchville Presbyterian Church cemetery

Cronin died on April 28, 1982, at Harford Memorial Hospital in Havre de Grace, Maryland. He was buried at Churchville Presbyterian Church.

== Legacy ==
In 1980, Cronin was the first recipient of Harford County Council's "Living Treasure of Harford County Award".
