= Morton H. Getz =

American politician (died 1995)

Member of the Maryland House of Delegates from the Harford County district
- In office 1959–1962 Serving with W. Dale Hess, Charles M. Moore, Joseph D. Tydings, W. Lester Davis
- Preceded by: Thomas J. Hatem

Personal details
- Died: April 5, 1995
- Party: Democratic
- Spouse: Irene Alk
- Children: 3

Morton H. Getz (died April 5, 1995) was an American politician from Maryland. He served as a member of the Maryland House of Delegates from 1959 to 1962.

== Career ==
Getz was a Democrat. He served as a member of the Maryland House of Delegates from 1959 to 1962.

== Personal life ==
Getz married Irene Alk. They had three children, Stewart, Shelby and Marc. He lived in Bel Air, Maryland.

Getz died on April 5, 1995. He was interred at Mikro Kodesh Beth Israel Congregation Cemetery.
