= John E. Clark (politician) =

American politician and judge (1910–2003)

Member of the Maryland House of Delegates from the Harford County district
- In office 1935–1947 Serving with James H. Broumel, Leo M. Moore, G. Arnold Pfaffenbach, Earle R. Burkins, Marshall T. Heaps, James J. DeRan Jr., Lena L. Moore, William S. James
- Succeeded by: J. Rush Baldwin

Personal details
- Born: April 1, 1910
- Died: January 3, 2003 (aged 92) Rising Sun, Maryland, U.S.
- Party: Democratic
- Spouse(s): Aileen Kane (divorced) Margo England Oliphant (divorced)
- Children: 4
- Education: University of Maryland (BS); University of Baltimore School of Law (LLB)
- Occupation: Politician; lawyer; judge; farmer; conservationist; preservationist

John E. Clark (April 1, 1910 – January 3, 2003) was an American politician, lawyer and judge from Maryland. He served as a member of the Maryland House of Delegates, representing Harford County, from 1935 to 1947.

== Early life ==
John E. Clark was born on April 1, 1910. Clark grew up in Forest Hill, Maryland. He graduated from the University of Maryland in 1934 with a Bachelor of Science in dairy science. He graduated from the University of Baltimore School of Law with a Bachelor of Laws in 1941. He was admitted to the bar in 1941.

== Career ==
Clark was a Democrat. Clark served as a member of the Maryland House of Delegates, representing Harford County, from 1935 to 1947.

Clark worked as a lawyer. He had a law practice with Paul McNabb, but later practiced alone and with partners Michael Birch and Mr. Kahoe. He served as a trial magistrate of Harford County from 1959 to 1967. He was chief judge of the People's Court of Harford County from 1967 to 1970. He served as an attorney on the board of county commissioners in Harford County from 1971 to 1972. He retired in 1986.

In the 1970s, Clark helped the state arrange the purchase of the land that became the Fair Hill Natural Resource Area. Clark was chairman of the Tidewater Fisheries Commission and the Board of Natural Resources. He was a founding member of the Maryland Historical Trust and was appointed founding chairman of the Maryland Environmental Trust by Governor Spiro Agnew. He was appointed lead for the Governor's committee in the Keep Maryland Beautiful campaign by Governor Theodore R. McKeldin and served as executive secretary of the Maryland State Fair board.

== Personal life ==
Clark was married to Aileen Kane and Margo England Oliphant. Both marriages ended in divorce. He had three sons and one daughter, John E., Philip A., James E. and Noel.

Clark owned Rigbie House and operated a commercial horse farm there. He also owned Tudor Hall, birthplace of John Wilkes Booth. He helped restore Rumsey Mansion in Joppa, Maryland.

Clark died on January 3, 2003, of heart failure, at Calvert Manor Healthcare Center in Rising Sun, Maryland.

== Legacy and awards ==
Clark received the Calvert Prize for historical preservation in 1980. He was designated the Soil Conservation Farmer of the Year in Harford County in 1997.
