= W. Lester Davis =

American politician and businessman (died 1978)

Member of the Maryland House of Delegates from the Harford County district
- In office 1961–1962 Serving with Morton H. Getz, W. Dale Hess, Charles M. Moore
- Preceded by: Joseph D. Tydings

Personal details
- Born: Savage, Maryland, U.S.
- Died: August 11, 1978 (aged 69) Havre de Grace, Maryland, U.S.
- Party: Democratic
- Spouse: Virginia Reamy
- Children: 7
- Occupation: Politician; businessman

W. Lester Davis (died August 11, 1978) was an American politician and businessman from Maryland. He served as a member of the Maryland House of Delegates, representing Harford County, from 1961 to 1962.

== Early life ==
W. Lester Davis was born in Savage, Maryland. He moved with his family, at the age of 15, to Aberdeen, Maryland.

== Career ==
Davis was a Democrat. He served as a member of the Maryland House of Delegates, representing Harford County from 1961 to 1962. He was head of the Democratic State Central Committee from 1956 to 1972.

Davis was president of Davis Concrete Company in Aberdeen. He purchased a 165 acres (67 ha) quarry in 1971 and it came to be known as Davis Quarry. He served as vice president and director of First National Bank of Northeast. He was the founder and director of the Aberdeen National Bank. He was commodore and founder of the Bush River Yacht Club.

== Personal life ==
Davis married Virginia Reamy. They had seven children, W. Lester Jr., Vickie, Sheree, Marie, Virginia, Leslie, Deborah.

Davis died on August 11, 1978, at the age of 69, at Harford Memorial Hospital in Havre de Grace.
