= 1970 Maryland gubernatorial election =

- November 3, 1970
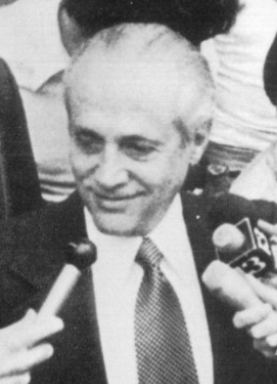

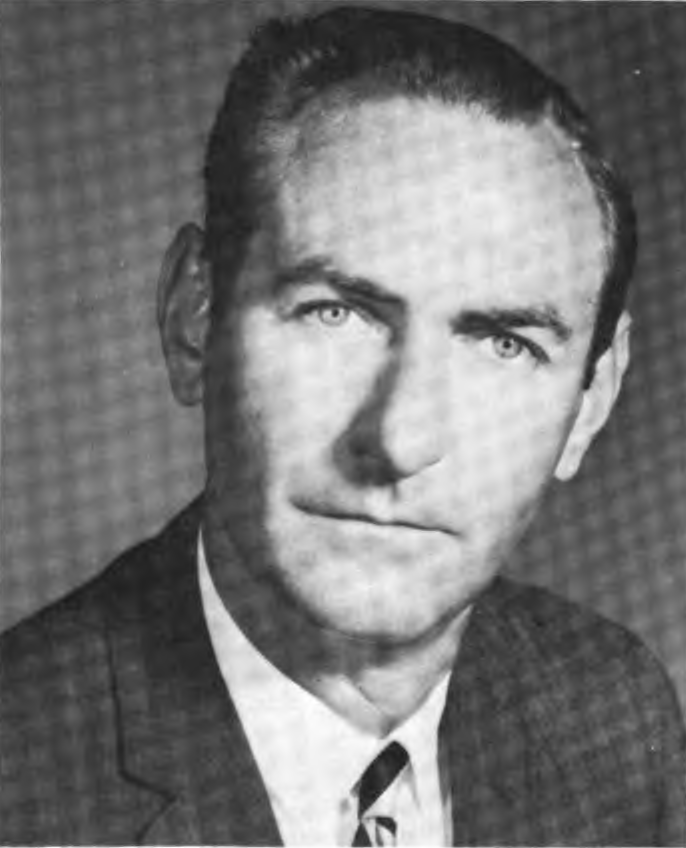
Nominee	Marvin Mandel	Charles Stanley Blair
Party	Democratic	Republican
Popular vote	639,579	314,336
Percentage	65.73%	32.30%
- County results Mandel: 40–50% 50–60% 60–70% 70–80% Blair: 40–50%
Governor before election
Marvin Mandel
Democratic
Elected Governor
Marvin Mandel
Democratic

The 1970 Maryland gubernatorial election was held on November 3, 1970. Incumbent Democrat Marvin Mandel defeated Republican nominee Charles Stanley Blair with 65.73% of the vote. This election was the first of eight consecutive Democratic gubernatorial victories in Maryland, a streak not broken until the election of Republican Bob Ehrlich in 2002.

== Primary elections ==
Primary elections were held on September 15, 1970.

=== Democratic primary ===
==== Candidates ====
- Marvin Mandel, incumbent Governor
- William Edward Roberts Sr.
- Dan W. Salamone
- George Herman Wright
- Milton Rothstein

==== Declined ====
- Sargent Shriver, former U.S. Ambassador to France and Director of the Peace Corps

==== Results ====
Democratic primary results
Party	Candidate	Votes	%
Democratic	Marvin Mandel (incumbent)	414,160	89.05
Democratic	William Edward Roberts Sr.	21,462	4.62
Democratic	Dan W. Salamone	11,670	2.51
Democratic	George Herman Wright	11,361	2.44
Democratic	Milton Rothstein	6,417	1.38
Total votes		465,070	100.00

=== Republican primary ===
==== Candidates ====
- Charles Stanley Blair, former Secretary of State of Maryland
- Peter James
- John C. Webb Jr.

==== Results ====
Republican primary results
Party	Candidate	Votes	%
Republican	Charles Stanley Blair	101,541	81.54
Republican	Peter James	15,790	12.68
Republican	John C. Webb Jr.	7,194	5.78
Total votes		124,525	100.00

== General election ==
=== Candidates ===
Major party candidates

- Marvin Mandel, Democratic
- Charles Stanley Blair, Republican

Other candidates

- Robert Woods Merkle Sr., American

=== Results ===
1970 Maryland gubernatorial election
Party	Candidate	Votes	%	±%
Democratic	Marvin Mandel (incumbent)	639,579	65.73%	
Republican	Charles Stanley Blair	314,336	32.30%	
American	Robert Woods Merkle Sr.	19,184	1.97%	
Majority		325,243		
Turnout		973,099		
Democratic hold		Swing		
