= James T. Norris =

American politician (1861–1942)

Member of the Maryland House of Delegates from the Harford County district
- In office 1922–1922 Serving with J. Fletcher Hopkins, John L. G. Lee, Mary E. W. Risteau

Personal details
- Born: March 27, 1861 The Rocks, Harford County, Maryland, U.S.
- Died: December 17, 1942 (aged 81) Abingdon, Maryland, U.S.
- Resting place: Union Chapel Cemetery
- Party: Democratic
- Spouse: M. Seleste Davis (m. 1887)
- Children: 1
- Occupation: Politician; farmer

James T. Norris (March 27, 1861 – December 17, 1942) was an American politician from Maryland. He served as a member of the Maryland House of Delegates, representing Harford County, in 1922.

== Early life ==
James T. Norris was born on March 27, 1861, near The Rocks in Harford County, Maryland. He was educated in public schools of Harford County.

== Career ==
Norris was a Democrat. In 1909, he was elected as county commissioner and served in that role for 12 years. He was chairman of the board of commissioners for four years. He served as a member of the Maryland House of Delegates, representing Harford County in 1922.

He worked as a farmer for over 30 years. He served as vice president and director of the Harford County Fair Association. He was director of the Commercial and Savings Bank.

== Personal life ==
Norris married M. Seleste Davis on March 16, 1887. They had one daughter, Mrs. Charles Elderdice. He was a member of Union Chapel for 65 years.

Norris died on December 17, 1942, at his home in Abingdon. He was buried at Union Chapel Cemetery.
