= William M. Whiteford =

American politician (died 1936)

Member of the Maryland House of Delegates from the Harford County district
- In office 1896–1900 Serving with T. Littleton Hanway, John L. G. Lee, Robert Seneca, Herman W. Hanson

Personal details
- Born: c. 1869
- Died: August 3, 1936 Pittsburgh, Pennsylvania, U.S.
- Resting place: Pittsburgh, Pennsylvania, U.S.
- Party: Democratic
- Children: 6
- Relatives: Samuel M. Whiteford (grandfather)
- Education: Eaton & Burnett's Business College

William M. Whiteford (c. 1869 – August 3, 1936) was an American politician from Maryland. He served as a member of the Maryland House of Delegates, representing Harford County from 1896 to 1900.

== Early life ==
William M. Whiteford was born around 1869 to Mollie (née Gladden) and James R. Whiteford. His grandfather was Samuel M. Whiteford, a state delegate. He graduated from Eaton & Burnett's Business College in Baltimore.

== Career ==
Whiteford worked in the insurance and fertilizer industry in Cambria.

Whiteford was a Democrat. He served as a member of the Maryland House of Delegates, representing Harford County from 1896 to 1900.

Whiteford moved to Pittsburgh, Pennsylvania, around 1906 and worked in real estate and insurance.

== Personal life ==
Whiteford married. They had two sons and four daughters.

Whiteford died on August 3, 1936, in Pittsburgh. He was buried in Pittsburgh.
