= John F. Joesting =

American politician (died 1978)

Member of the Maryland House of Delegates from the Harford County district
- In office 1931–1933 Serving with James H. Broumel, Marshall T. Heaps, Mary E. W. Risteau

Personal details
- Died: April 17, 1978 (aged 73) Baltimore, Maryland, U.S.
- Resting place: Bel Air Memorial Gardens; Bel Air, Harford County, Maryland, U.S.
- Party: Democratic
- Spouse: Mary Kaylor (died 1963)
- Children: 4
- Education: University of Maryland
- Occupation: Politician; real estate businessman; farmer

John F. Joesting (died April 17, 1978) was an American politician and real estate appraiser from Maryland. He served as a member of the Maryland House of Delegates, representing Harford County, from 1931 to 1933.

== Early life ==
John F. Joesting attended the University of Maryland.

== Career ==
Joesting was a Democrat. He served as a member of the Maryland House of Delegates, representing Harford County, from 1931 to 1933.

In 1933, Joesting began work as a real estate appraiser and continued that work until his death. He served as president of the Harford County Appraisers Society. In the early 1930s, Joesting worked as chief dept adjuster in the northeastern states for the Farm Security Administration.

Joesting served in the National Guard in the late 1930s and early 1940s. He also operated a family dairy farm known as Webster's Farm in Churchville, Maryland.

== Personal life ==
Joesting married Mary Kaylor. His wife died in 1963. He had three daughters and one son, Judith, Elizabeth E., Mary Kay and John F. Jr. He lived in Churchville.

Joesting died April 17, 1978, at the age of 73, at Johns Hopkins Hospital in Baltimore. He was buried at Bel Air Memorial Gardens in Bel Air, Maryland.
