= R. Wilson Scarff =

American politician (1926–2009)

Member of the Maryland House of Delegates from the Harford County district
- In office 1963–1974 Serving with William H. Cox Jr., William C. Greer, Jon Harlan Livezey, W. Dale Hess, Winton B. Osborne, C. Stanley Blair, John W. Hardwicke

Personal details
- Born: June 15, 1926 Fallston, Maryland, U.S.
- Died: March 16, 2009 (aged 82) Bel Air, Maryland, U.S.
- Resting place: Bel Air Memorial Gardens; Bel Air, Maryland, U.S.
- Party: Republican
- Spouse: Elizabeth Anne Koller (died 2006)

R. Wilson Scarff (June 15, 1926 – March 16, 2009) was an American politician from Maryland. He served in the Maryland House of Delegates, representing Harford County, from 1963 to 1974.

== Early life ==
Ross Wilson Scarff was born on June 15, 1926, in Fallston, Maryland, to Addie (née Wilson) and G. Ross Scarff. He attended Harford County Public Schools.

== Career ==
Scarff was a merchant. He served in the United States Army from 1951 to 1953.

Scarff was a Republican. Scarff served in the Maryland House of Delegates, representing Harford County, from 1963 to 1974.

== Personal life ==
Scarff married Elizabeth Anne Koller. His wife died in 2006.

Scarff died on March 16, 2009, in Bel Air, Maryland. He was buried at Bel Air Memorial Gardens.
