= Robert R. Lawder =

American politician (died 1967)

Member of the Maryland Senate
- In office November 1953 – 1954
- Preceded by: D. Paul McNabb
- Succeeded by: William S. James
- Constituency: Harford County

Mayor of Havre de Grace, Maryland
- In office 1939–1951

Member of the Maryland House of Delegates
- In office 1924–1930 Serving with Benjamin M. Dever, Charles A. McGaw, Mary E. W. Risteau, Frederick Lee Cobourn, J. Wilmer Cronin, Marshall T. Heaps
- Constituency: Harford County

Personal details
- Born: Robert Ranson Lawder; August 17, 1894 Havre de Grace, Maryland, U.S.
- Died: September 3, 1967 (aged 73) Baltimore, Maryland, U.S.
- Resting place: Angel Hill Cemetery; Havre de Grace, Maryland, U.S.
- Party: Democratic
- Spouse: Helen May Cobourn (m. 1916)
- Children: 1
- Parent: Harry C. Lawder (father)
- Education: University of Maryland
- Occupation: Politician

Robert Ranson Lawder (August 17, 1894 – September 3, 1967) was an American politician from Maryland. Lawder served as a member of the Maryland House of Delegates from 1924 to 1930. He served as mayor of Havre de Grace from 1939 to 1951. He served as a member of the Maryland Senate from 1953 to 1954.

== Early life ==
Robert Ranson Lawder was born on August 17, 1894, in Havre de Grace, Maryland, to Esther Roxanna (née Moore) and Harry C. Lawder. His father was a postmaster and a member of the Maryland House of Delegates. His mother was the daughter of Captain William Moore and a descendant of John O'Neill. He graduated from Havre de Grace High School and the University of Maryland.

== Career ==
After graduating college, Lawder worked for the Pennsylvania Railroad Company for two years. He then became a clerk of the United States mail service. Starting in 1919, Lawder worked in the hay and grain business.

Lawder was a Democrat. From 1924 to 1930, Lawder served as a member of the Maryland House of Delegates, representing Harford County. In 1927, Lawder worked to extend fishing rights on the Chesapeake Bay.

Lawder ran for mayor of Havre de Grace in 1933. He was defeated by incumbent mayor George D. Pennington. From 1931 to 1933, Lawder served as a member of the city council in Havre de Grace. He served again from 1934 to 1936 and served as president of the city council. Lawder defeated Pennington's brother, Robert R. Pennington, in the election for mayor of Havre de Grace in 1939. He served as mayor for six terms until 1951, when he did not seek re-election and was succeeded by Walter McLhinney. During World War II, Lawder served on the rationing board. He also served on the county planning and zoning board.

Lawder was appointed by Governor Theodore McKeldin as a member of the Maryland Senate, representing Harford County, in November 1953, after D. Paul McNabb resigned. He then served as a judge in the Harford County court. He served as president of the Columbian Building and Loan Association and as vice president of the First National Bank and Trust Company of Havre de Grace.

== Personal life ==
Lawder married Helen May Cobourn, daughter of Ambrose B. Cobourn, on June 21, 1916. They had a son, Robert Cobourn He was a member of the Episcopal church.

Lawder died September 3, 1967, at Johns Hopkins Hospital in Baltimore. He was buried at Angel Hill Cemetery in Havre de Grace.
