= Frederick Lee Cobourn =

American politician and judge (1885–1962)

Member of the Maryland House of Delegates from the Harford County district
- In office 1927–1930 Serving with J. Wilmer Cronin, Marshall T. Heaps, Robert R. Lawder
- In office 1918–1920 Serving with John L. G. Lee, Noble L. Mitchell, J. Fletcher Hopkins, Millard E. Tydings

Personal details
- Born: October 12, 1885 Havre de Grace, Maryland, U.S.
- Died: June 23, 1962 (aged 76) Havre de Grace, Maryland, U.S.
- Resting place: Angel Hill Cemetery; Havre de Grace, Maryland, U.S.
- Party: Democratic
- Spouse: Florence H.
- Children: 2
- Relatives: Harold E. Cobourn (brother)
- Education: University of Maryland School of Law
- Occupation: Politician; judge

Frederick Lee Cobourn (October 12, 1885 – June 23, 1962) was an American politician and judge from Maryland. He served as a member of the Maryland House of Delegates, representing Harford County, from 1918 to 1920 and from 1927 to 1930.

== Early life ==
Frederick Lee Cobourn was born on October 12, 1885, in Havre de Grace, Maryland, to Lydia (née Cox) and Hiram C. Cobourn. His brother was Harold E. Cobourn.

At the age of 12, his father died and Cobourn left school to work. Cobourn studied with a local minister to be eligible for college. Cobourn graduated from the University of Maryland School of Law in 1913. He was then admitted to the bar.

== Career ==
Following his admission to the bar, Cobourn opened law offices in Havre de Grace and Bel Air.

Cobourn was a Democrat. He served as a member of the Maryland House of Delegates, representing Harford County, from 1918 to 1920 and from 1927 to 1930. In 1921, Cobourn was defeated by Millard Tydings for the Democratic nomination for the Maryland Senate. He retired from politics in 1953.

Cobourn was a judge of the Third Judicial Circuit Court, which included Harford and Baltimore counties, from November 1938 to November 1953.

== Personal life ==
Cobourn married Florence H. and had a son and daughter, G. Howlett and Mrs. Alfred Walgren. He lived on South Union Avenue in Havre de Grace.

Cobourn died on June 23, 1962, at Harford Memorial Hospital in Havre de Grace. He was buried at Angel Hill Cemetery in Havre de Grace.
