= Mary Risteau =

American politician (1890–1978)

Maryland House of Delegates
- In office 1951–1955 Serving with J. Rush Baldwin, A. Freeborn Brown, William S. James
- Constituency: Harford County

Maryland Senate
- In office 1935–1937
- Preceded by: Abram G. Ensor
- Succeeded by: J. Wilmer Cronin
- Constituency: Harford County

Maryland House of Delegates
- In office 1931–1935 Serving with James H. Broumel, Marshall T. Heaps, John F. Joesting
- Constituency: Harford County
- In office 1922–1926 Serving with J. Fletcher Hopkins, John L. G. Lee, James T. Norris, Benjamin M. Dever, Robert R. Lawder, Charles A. McGaw
- Constituency: Harford County

Personal details
- Born: Mary Eliza Watters Risteau; April 24, 1890 Towson, Maryland, U.S.
- Died: July 24, 1978 (aged 88) Jarrettsville, Maryland, U.S.
- Resting place: William Watters Memorial Church Cemetery
- Party: Democratic
- Education: Towson University; University of Baltimore School of Law (LLB)
- Occupation: Politician; farmer; educator; clerk

Mary Eliza Watters Risteau (April 24, 1890 – July 24, 1978) was an American politician who was the first woman elected to both the Maryland House of Delegates and the Maryland State Senate.

== Early life ==
Mary Eliza Watters Risteau was born in Towson, Maryland, on April 24, 1890, to Elizabeth (née Watters) and William M. Risteau. She graduated from Towson High School in 1907. In 1912, she graduated from Towson University (then the Maryland State Normal School). She completed a special advanced course of study in Mathematics at Johns Hopkins University in 1917 before serving as a schoolteacher. In 1938, Risteau received her L.L.B. Degree from the University of Baltimore School of Law. In 1917, she moved to Eden Manor, the Watters family dairy farm, a property her mother inherited in Jarrettsville.

== Political career ==
In 1921, Risteau, a Democrat, became the first woman elected to the Maryland House of Delegates and served four terms (1922-1926 and 1931–1935) followed by an election to the Maryland Senate in 1935 for a single term. She ran for the Senate first in 1926 but lost to A. G. Ensor. She served on several committees while in the Senate, including the Committee on Education and the Committee on Agriculture, during her time in the General Assembly, and she was a strong sponsor of women's rights. She sided with the "wet forces" and served on the Senate Temperance Committee and spoke out against Prohibition. In 1944, she ran against incumbent Harry Streett Baldwin for Maryland's 2nd congressional district.

Concurrent to her role as a legislator, she served as the first woman on the Maryland State Board of Education for 16 years. She was appointed to this position by Governor Albert Ritchie in 1922. Risteau was also a clerk of the Circuit Court for Harford County; she was appointed as the first woman clerk in 1938 and served for one year. In 1939, she was appointed as the first woman State Commissioner of Loans in Maryland.

In 1951, she was elected one final time to the House of Delegates, where she served for another four years.

== Awards and legacy ==
In 1987, she was posthumously inducted into Towson High School's Alumni Hall of Fame. In 1988, she was posthumously inducted into Maryland Women's Hall of Fame.

The Mary E. W. Risteau Multi Services Center, a district court building in Bel Air, Maryland was named in her honor.

== Personal life ==
Risteau never married. She was known as "Miss Mary" by contemporaries.

== Death ==
She died on July 24, 1978, at her dairy farm in Jarrettsville at the age of 88. She is buried at William Watters Memorial Church Cemetery in Jarrettsville.
