= W. Dale Hess =

American politician (1930–2016)

Walter Dale Hess

Member of the Maryland House of Delegates from the Harford County district
- In office 1955–1970 Serving with Thomas J. Hatem, Charles M. Moore, Joseph D. Tydings, Morton H. Getz, W. Lester Davis, C. Stanley Blair, John W. Hardwicke, R. Wilson Scarff, William C. Greer, Winton B. Osborne

Personal details
- Born: August 17, 1930 Fallston, Maryland, U.S.
- Died: October 22, 2016 (aged 86) Fallston, Maryland, U.S.
- Party: Democratic
- Spouse: Marie Ritchie
- Children: 4
- Occupation: Politician; farmer; realtor

Walter Dale Hess (August 17, 1930 – October 22, 2016) was an American politician, farmer and realtor from Maryland. He served in the Maryland House of Delegates, representing Harford County, from 1955 to 1970.

== Early life ==
Walter Dale Hess was born on August 17, 1930, in Fallston, Maryland, to Anita Chenworth and St. Clair Hess. He attended Harford County Public Schools. He graduated from Bel Air High School in 1947.

== Career ==
Hess was a Democratic. Hess served in the Maryland House of Delegates, representing Harford County, from 1955 to 1970. He was the majority floor leader from 1963 to 1966 and the majority whip from 1967 to 1968.

After leaving the House of Delegates, he became vice president of Tidewater Insurance. In 1977, Hess was convicted of mail fraud and racketeering. He was sentenced to three years in prison, but the charges were dropped in federal appeals court. After prison, he founded a bank in York, Pennsylvania.

Hess was a farmer and realtor. He held interests in land, motels, apartments and shopping centers in Harford County. He served as president of the Harford County Democratic Club. He served as national vice president of Futures Farmers of America.

== Personal life ==
Hess married Marie Ritchie. They had four children.

Hess died from complications of cancer on October 22, 2016, at his home in Fallston.
