= J. Fletcher Hopkins =

American politician (died 1953)

Member of the Maryland House of Delegates from the Harford County district
- In office 1920–1922 Serving with Frederick Lee Cobourn, Millard E. Tydings, John L. G. Lee, James T. Norris, Mary E. W. Risteau

Personal details
- Born: John Fletcher Hopkins
- Died: August 29, 1953
- Resting place: Darlington Cemetery; Darlington, Maryland, U.S.
- Party: Democratic
- Spouse: Ella Hollis (m. 1907; died 1948)
- Occupation: Politician

J. Fletcher Hopkins (died August 29, 1953) was an American politician from Maryland. He served as a member of the Maryland House of Delegates, representing Harford County, from 1920 to 1922.

== Early life ==
John Fletcher Hopkins was from Darlington, Maryland.

== Career ==
Hopkins was a Democrat. He served as a member of the Maryland House of Delegates, representing Harford County, from 1920 to 1922.

== Personal life ==
Hopkins married Ella Hollis on August 27, 1907, in Aberdeen, Maryland. His wife died in 1948.

Hopkins died on August 29, 1953. He was buried at Darlington Cemetery.
