= A. Freeborn Brown =

American politician and lawyer (1915–1998)

Member of the Maryland House of Delegates from the Harford County district
- In office 1951–1954 Serving with J. Rush Baldwin, William S. James, Mary E. W. Risteau

Personal details
- Born: A. Freeborn Brown III; February 4, 1915 Havre de Grace, Maryland, U.S.
- Died: July 25, 1998 (aged 83) Bel Air, Maryland, U.S.
- Party: Democratic
- Spouse: Catherine T. Healy (m. 1943)
- Children: 6
- Education: Loyola College
- Alma mater: University of Maryland; University of Maryland School of Law
- Occupation: Politician; lawyer

A. Freeborn Brown III (February 4, 1915 – July 25, 1998) was an American politician and lawyer from Maryland. He served as a member of the Maryland House of Delegates, representing Harford County, from 1951 to 1954.

== Early life ==
A. Freeborn Brown III was born on February 4, 1915, in Havre de Grace, Maryland, to A. Freeborn Brown. His father was a Baltimore lawyer and served as city attorney in Havre de Grace. Brown attended public school in Havre de Grace and graduated from Loyola High School in 1933. He attended Loyola College and graduated from the University of Maryland in 1937. He graduated from the University of Maryland School of Law in 1941.

== Career ==
In 1940, Brown joined his father's law practice on Main Street in Bel Air, Maryland. During World War II, Brown served as a counterintelligence officer and was stationed in Europe. Brown practiced law with Brown, Brown and Brown until around 1996. In the 1970s, Brown served as city attorney of Havre de Grace.

Brown was a Democrat. He served as a member of the Maryland House of Delegates, representing Harford County, from 1951 to 1954.

== Personal life ==
Brown married Catherine T. Healy in 1943. They had four sons and two daughters, Augustus F. IV, J. Patrick, Thomas F., Michael D., Mary Louise and Teresa. Brown moved from Havre de Grace to Bel Air in 1984.

Brown died on July 25, 1998, at his home in Bel Air.
