= Leo M. Moore =

American politician and newspaperman (died 1946)

Member of the Maryland House of Delegates from the Harford County district
- In office 1935–1946 Serving with James H. Broumel, John E. Clark, G. Arnold Pfaffenbach, Earle R. Burkins, Marshall T. Heaps, James J. DeRan Jr.
- Succeeded by: Lena L. Moore

Personal details
- Born: Cecil County, Maryland, U.S.
- Died: January 9, 1946 Havre de Grace, Maryland, U.S.
- Resting place: Mount Erin Cemetery; Havre de Grace, Maryland, U.S.
- Party: Democratic
- Spouse: Lena Lamm (m. 1920)
- Children: 3, including Charles M.
- Parent: Michael Moore (father)
- Occupation: Politician; newspaper publisher

Leo M. Moore (died January 9, 1946) was an American politician and newspaper publisher from Maryland. He served as a member of the Maryland House of Delegates, representing Harford County from 1935 to 1946.

== Early life ==
Leo M. Moore was born at Principio Furnace in Cecil County, Maryland, to Martha J. (née Kurtz) and Michael Moore. His father was a member of the Maryland House of Delegates.

== Career ==
Moore worked as a printer's devil at the Cecil Whig paper in Elkton, Maryland. He purchased the Democratic Ledger paper from E. H. Pitchett in 1907. He published that paper until his death. He served as president of the Maryland Press Association in 1924.

Moore was a Democrat. He served as a member of the Maryland House of Delegates, representing Harford County, from 1935 to 1946. He served until his death, and his wife, Lena L. Moore succeeded him.

Moore served as director and vice president of the Havre de Grace National Bank. He was also president of the Maryland State Firemen's Association. He served as president of the board of trustees of the Jacob Tome Institution.

== Personal life ==
Moore married Lena Lamm in January 17, 1920. They had two sons and one daughter, Charles M., Leo M. Jr. and Mrs. Breen Bland.

Moore died of a heart attack on January 9, 1946, at his home in Havre de Grace, Maryland. He was buried at Mount Erin Cemetery in Havre de Grace.
