= St. Mary's Church (Abingdon, Maryland) =

Historic church in Maryland, United States

- U.S. National Register of Historic Places
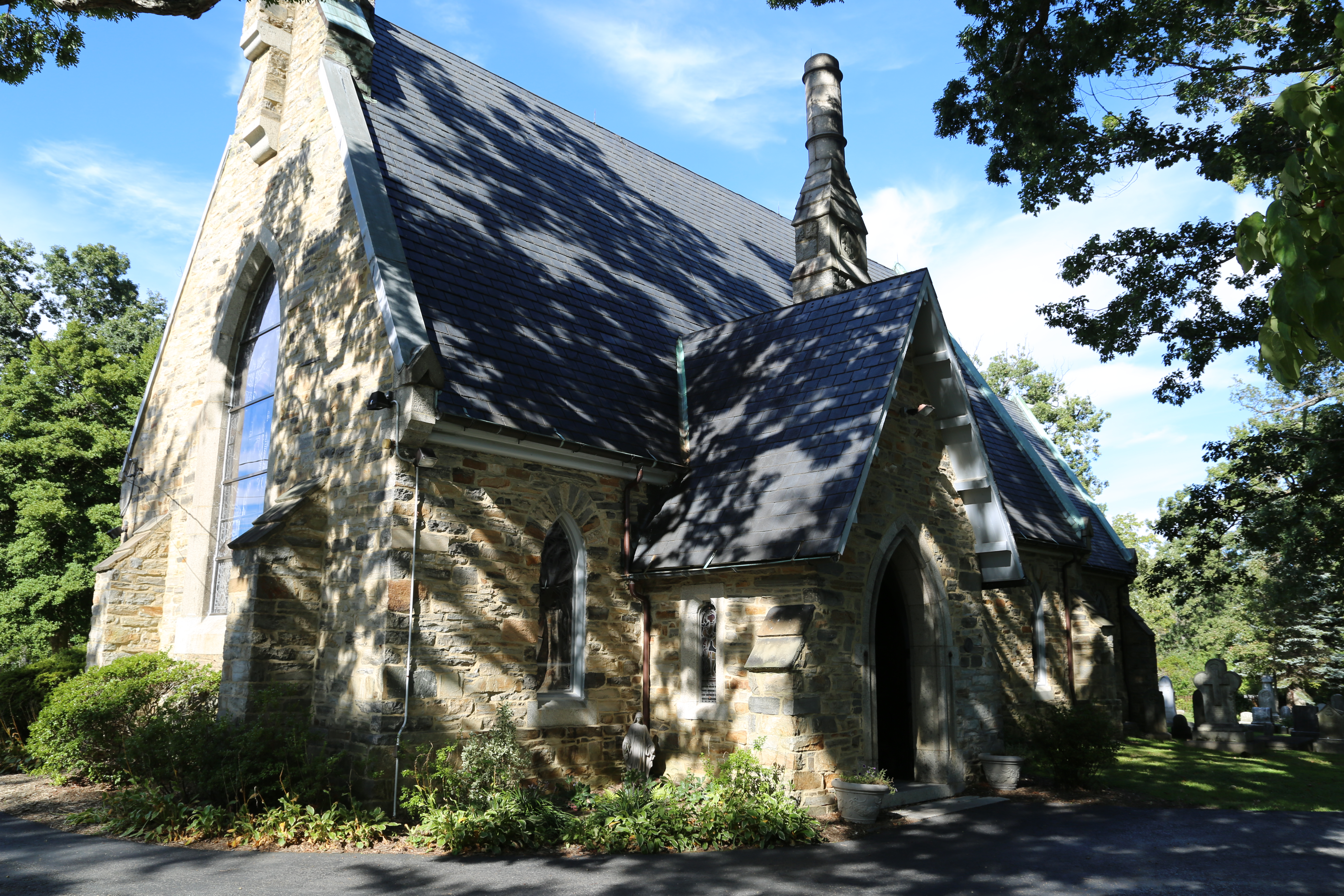
- St. Mary's Church in 2014

- Location within Maryland Location within the United States
- Location: South of Emmorton on MD 24, Abingdon, Maryland
- Coordinates: 39°29′16″N 76°19′4″W
- Area: 9 acres (3.6 ha)
- Built: 1851
- Architectural style: Gothic Revival
- NRHP reference No.: 73000928
- Added to NRHP: March 30, 1973

St. Mary's Church is a historic Episcopal church in Abingdon, Maryland. It is a small Gothic Revival parish church. It was built about 1851 and carefully designed in the "Early English" manner with gray rubble stone walls, cut Port Deposit granite trim, and a very steep slate-covered roof. It features an ornamental chimney, with a fleur-de-lis, the symbol of the Virgin Mary, in a bas-relief panel. It is the only church in America to have a complete set of stained glass windows designed by William Butterfield, the English Gothic Revival architect. Johannes Oertel did the chancel paintings.

It was listed on the National Register of Historic Places in 1973.

== Notable interments ==
- James H. Broumel (died 1948), Maryland delegate
- James McLean (died 1956), Maryland delegate
