= Abram G. Ensor =

American politician (died 1959)

Member of Maryland Senate
- In office 1927–1933
- Preceded by: David G. Harry
- Succeeded by: Mary Risteau
- Constituency: Harford County

Personal details
- Born: Abram Gorsuch Ensor
- Died: June 30, 1959 (aged 79) Forest Hill, Maryland, U.S.
- Party: Democratic
- Spouse: Florence Whitaker (m. 1905)
- Occupation: Politician; farmer

Abram Gorsuch Ensor (died June 30, 1959) was a politician from Maryland. He served as a member of the Maryland Senate from 1927 to 1933.

== Early life ==
Abram Gorsuch Ensor was born to Mollie (née Gorsuch) and John E. Ensor.

== Career ==
Ensor was a Democrat. Ensor served in the Maryland Senate, representing Harford County, from 1927 to 1933.

Ensor helped organize the Harford County Farm Bureau. He served as secretary-treasurer of the organization for 25 years. He served as director and secretary of the Harford County Farm Fair Association. Ensor served as master of the Maryland State Grange from 1925 to 1933. Ensor served as president of the Forest Hill State Bank.

== Personal life ==
Ensor married Florence Whitaker of Forest Hill, Maryland, on June 3, 1905.

Ensor died on June 30, 1959, at the age of 79, at his home in Forest Hill.
