= Emmorton, Maryland =

Unincorporated community in Maryland, U.S.

Coordinates: 39°29′43″N 76°19′22″W

Emmorton is an unincorporated community in Harford County, Maryland, United States. St. Mary's Church was listed on the National Register of Historic Places in 1973.
