= Marshall T. Heaps =

American politician and businessman (died 1961)

Member of the Maryland House of Delegates from the Harford County district
- In office 1939–1943 Serving with Earle R. Burkins, John E. Clark, Leo M. Moore
- Succeeded by: James J. DeRan Jr.
- In office 1927–1933 Serving with Frederick Lee Cobourn, J. Wilmer Cronin, Robert R. Lawder, James H. Broumel, John F. Joesting, Mary E. W. Risteau

Personal details
- Died: August 7, 1961 (aged 62) Baltimore, Maryland, U.S.
- Resting place: Slate Ridge Cemetery; Cardiff, Maryland, U.S.
- Party: Democratic
- Spouse: Helen A.
- Children: 2
- Occupation: Politician; farmer; businessman

Marshall T. Heaps (died August 7, 1961) was an American politician, farmer and businessman from Maryland. He served as a member of the Maryland House of Delegates, representing Harford County, from 1927 to 1933 and from 1939 to 1943.

== Career ==
Heaps was a Democrat. He served as a member of the Maryland House of Delegates, representing Harford County, from 1927 to 1933 and from 1939 to 1943.

Heaps owned several farms in Harford County. He operated Heaps Motor Company, a Ford automobile agency in Cardiff, Maryland, for 42 years.

== Personal life ==
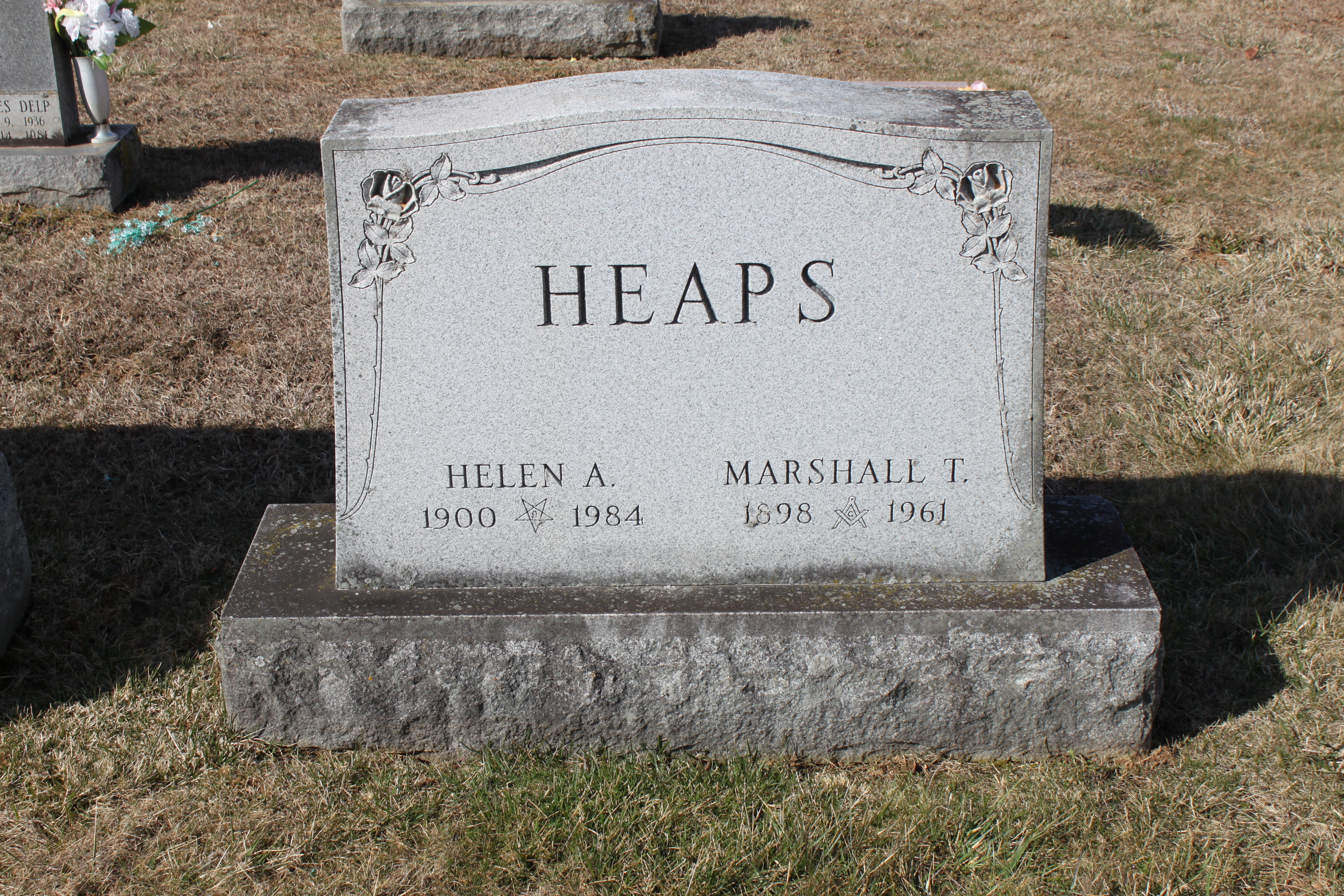
Grave of Heaps at Slate Ridge Cemetery

Heaps was married to Helen A. He had a son and daughter, Marshall T. Jr. and Eleanor. He was a member, trustee and supervisor of sunday school at Slate Ridge Presbyterian Church.

Heaps died on August 7, 1961, at the age of 62, at Union Memorial Hospital in Baltimore. He was buried at Slate Ridge Cemetery in Cardiff.
