= Nicolai Getz =

Norwegian chess player (born 1991)

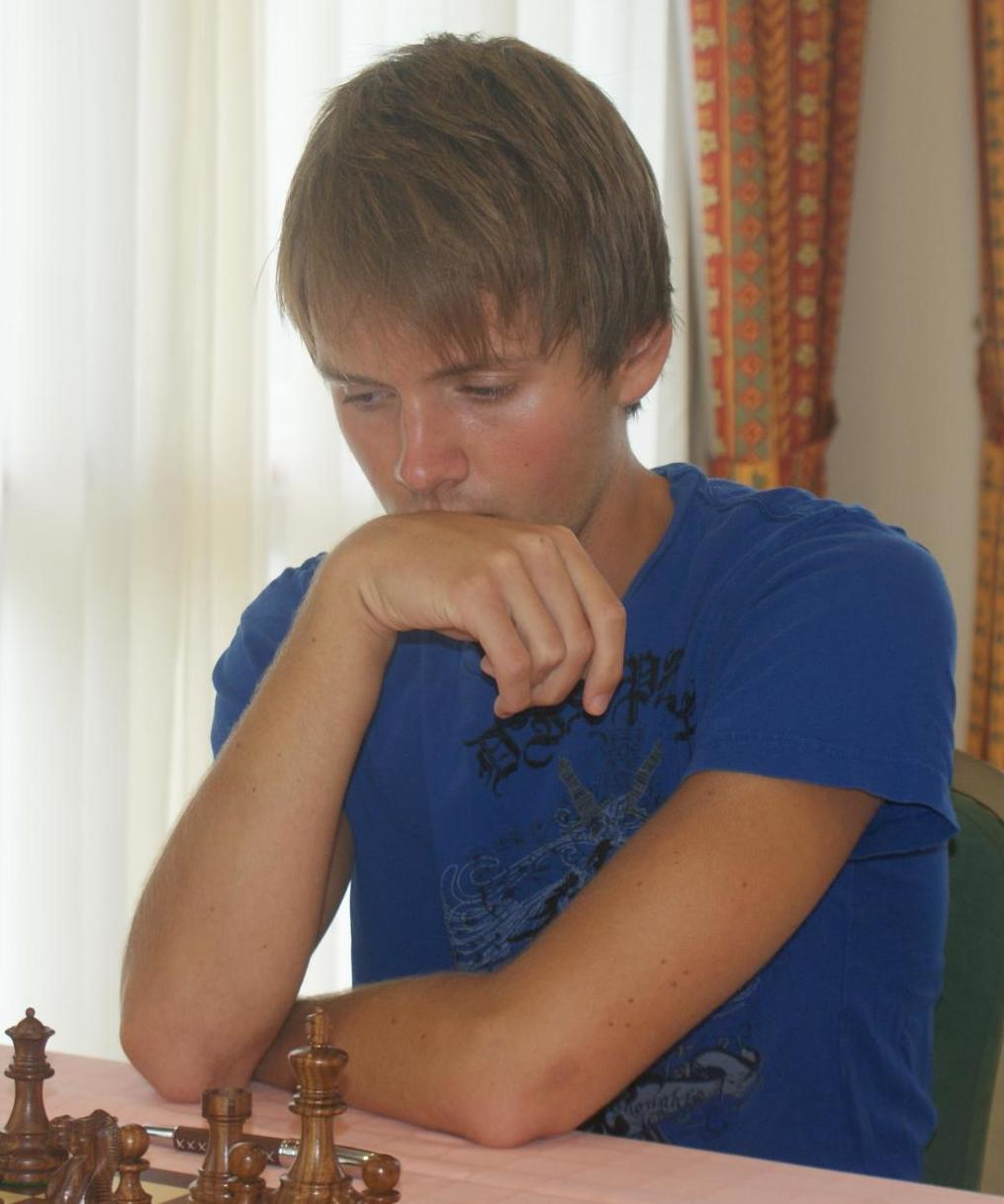
- Getz at the 2012 Andorra Open

Personal information
- Born: 19 November 1991 (age 34)

Chess career
- Country: Norway
- Title: International Master (2011)
- Peak rating: 2461 (July 2016)

Nicolai Getz (born 19 November 1991) is a Norwegian chess International Master.

== Biography ==
Nicolai Getz played for Norway in European Youth Chess Championships (2007, 2009) and World Youth Chess Championships (2008). In 2010, in Budapest he ranked 3rd in International Chess Tournament First Saturday. In 2016, in Copenhagen Nicolai Getz ranked 4th in International Chess Tournament Copenhagen Chess Challenge.

Nicolai Getz played for Norway in the Chess Olympiad:

- In 2016, at reserve board in the 42nd Chess Olympiad in Baku (+0, =1, -0).

Nicolai Getz played for Norway in the European Team Chess Championship:

- In 2011, at fourth board in the 18th European Team Chess Championship in Porto Carras (+4, =4, -1).

Also Nicolai Getz five times played for Oslo chess club Oslo Schakselskap in the European Chess Club Cup (2009-2011, 2015-2016).

In 2011, he was awarded the FIDE International Master (IM) title.
