= John L. G. Lee =

American politician and lawyer (1869–1952)

Speaker of the Maryland House of Delegates
- In office 1922
- Preceded by: Millard Tydings
- Succeeded by: Francis P. Curtis

Member of the Maryland House of Delegates
- In office 1896–1896 Serving with T. Littleton Hanway, Robert Seneca, William M. Whiteford
- In office 1918–1918 Serving with Frederick Lee Cobourn, Noble L. Mitchell
- In office 1922–1922 Serving with J. Fletcher Hopkins, James T. Norris, Mary E. W. Risteau

Personal details
- Born: John Leypold Griffith Lee; 1869 Bel Air, Maryland, U.S.
- Died: May 29, 1952 (aged 82–83) Bel Air, Maryland, U.S.
- Resting place: Rock Spring Cemetery; Forest Hill, Maryland, U.S.
- Party: Democratic
- Spouse: Caroline Webster Hunger (m. 1914)
- Parent: Otho S. Lee (father)
- Education: Johns Hopkins University; University of Maryland School of Law
- Occupation: Politician; lawyer; farmer

John Leypold Griffith Lee (1869 – May 29, 1952) was an American politician and lawyer. He served in the Maryland House of Delegates, representing Harford County, and served as the Speaker of the Maryland House of Delegates in 1922.

== Early life ==
John Leypold Griffith Lee was born in 1869, in Bel Air, Maryland to Sallie (née Griffith) and Colonel Otho Scott Lee. He attended Bel Air Academy. Lee graduated from the Johns Hopkins University in 1893. He then graduated from the University of Maryland School of Law. He was admitted to the bar on December 13, 1883.

== Career ==
Lee worked as a lawyer and farmer. He worked as an assistant district attorney under William L. Marbury. He served on the staff of Governor Edwin Warfield.

Lee was a Democrat. Lee served in the Maryland House of Delegates, representing Harford County, in 1896, 1918 and 1922. He served as Speaker of the Maryland House of Delegates in 1922. Lee ran against Millard Tydings for the Democratic nomination for U.S. Senator.

== Personal life ==
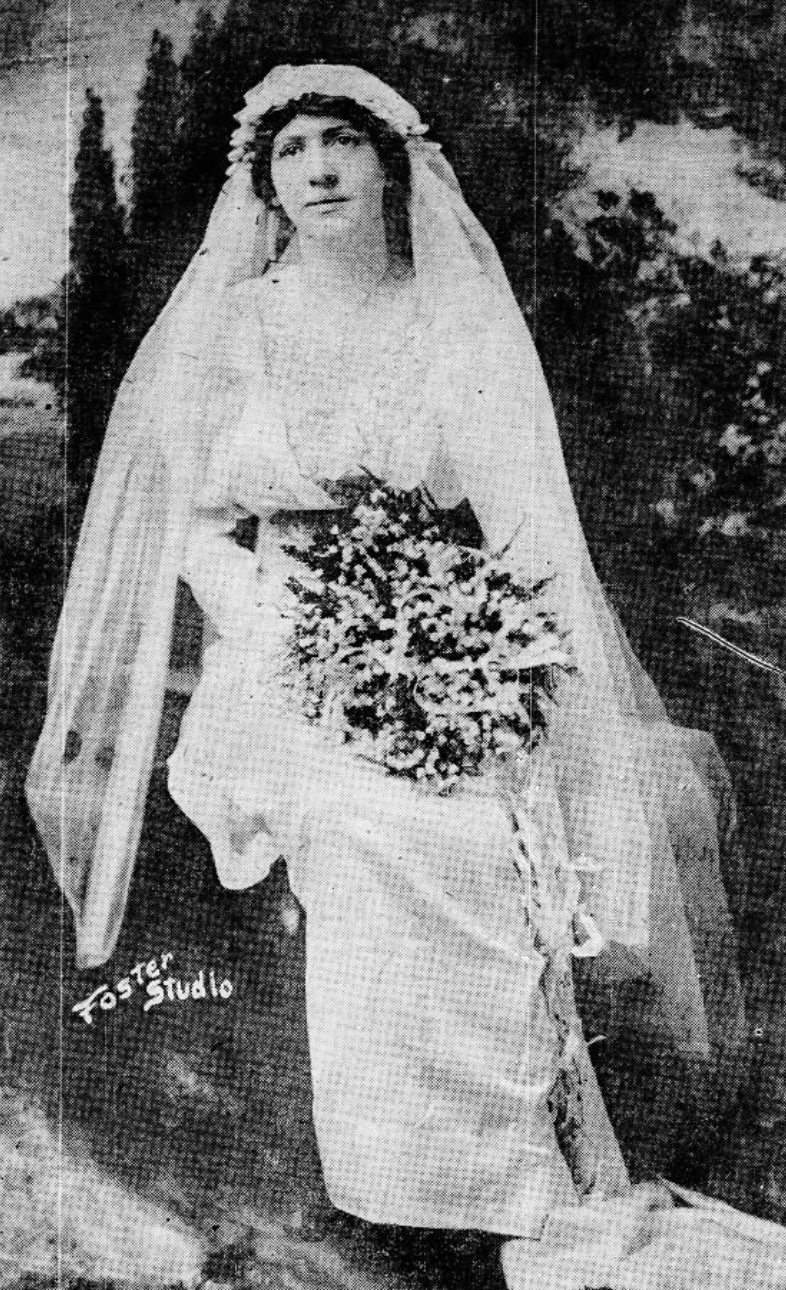
Caroline Webster Hunter in her wedding gown (1914)

Lee married Caroline Webster Hunter, of Bel Air, on January 10, 1914. After their marriage, they lived at 829 North Charles Street in Baltimore.

Lee died on May 29, 1952, at his home in Bel Air. He was buried at Rock Spring Cemetery in Forest Hill, Maryland.
