= William S. James =

American politician (1914–1993)

Treasurer of Maryland
- In office 1975–1987
- Governor: Marvin Mandel; Harry Hughes
- Preceded by: J. Millard Tawes
- Succeeded by: Lucille Maurer

Member of the Maryland Senate
- In office 1954–1974
- Preceded by: Robert R. Lawder
- Succeeded by: New district established
- Constituency: Harford County

Member of the Maryland House of Delegates
- In office 1947–1954 Serving with Earle R. Burkins, John E. Clark, James J. DeRan Jr., J. Rush Baldwin, James McLean, A. Freeborn Brown, Mary E. W. Risteau
- Constituency: Harford County

Personal details
- Born: William Smith James; February 14, 1914 Aberdeen, Maryland, U.S.
- Died: April 17, 1993 (aged 79) Aberdeen, Maryland, U.S.
- Party: Democratic
- Spouse: Margaret Higinbothom (m. 1954)
- Children: 2, including Mary-Dulany James
- Education: University of Delaware; University of Maryland (JD)
- Occupation: Lawyer; politician
- Nickname(s): Bill, Billy

William Smith James (February 14, 1914 – April 17, 1993) was a Maryland state politician. James was first elected to office as a member of the Maryland House of Delegates representing Harford County in 1946, and after serving two terms was elected to the Maryland Senate in 1954. He served in the Senate for a further two decades, from 1963 onwards as President of the Maryland Senate. Following his retirement from the state Senate in 1974, James was appointed State Treasurer, a position he held from 1975 through 1987. His daughter, Mary-Dulany James, was a member of the Maryland House of Delegates representing District 34A in Cecil and Harford Counties from 1999 until 2015.

== Early life ==
William Smith James was born the son of E. Roy James, a road builder and dairy farmer, and Mary S. James in Aberdeen, Maryland, on February 14, 1914. His primary education was diverse; he attended public schools in Cecil and Harford counties before matriculating at the Tome School, a private coeducational college preparatory school in Port Deposit. He earned his bachelor's degree from the University of Delaware and, in 1937, a Juris Doctor degree from the University of Maryland School of Law, entering the Maryland Bar the same year.

== Career ==
James was rejected for military service in World War II due to a "bum arm". James immediately established a law practice in Bel Air, and continued to practice law there until 1975. He quickly rose to prominence in the legal community, and served as a trial magistrate in Havre de Grace from 1944 to 1946, a position he left when he won election to the Maryland House of Delegates representing Harford County. He ran first for the House of Delegates in 1942, but wasn't successful until 1946. He served in the House of Delegates from 1947 to 1954. He was elected in 1954 to represent Harford County in the Maryland Senate.

In 1963, James was elected by his fellow senators to serve as President of the Maryland Senate, a position he held for more than a decade. This led to other prominent positions in state politics. He was the second Vice President of the 1967 Constitutional Convention, became Chairman of the Commission to Revise the Annotated Code of Maryland in 1970, and in 1971 became Chairperson of the Maryland Democratic Party. During his long career in the Senate, James was recognized for a number of major legislative accomplishments. He helped establish the community college system in Maryland, the Maryland Environmental Trust, and the Maryland Historical Trust, and his work led to the creation of Program Open Space, a program in which real estate taxes are used to purchase park land.

His retirement from the Senate in 1974 did not mark his exit from state politics, as the next year he was appointed by the Senate as State Treasurer, a position to which he was re-elected in 1979 and 1983. Governor William Donald Schaefer, who opposed James's reappointment as State Treasurer, was successful in having the Senate appoint Lucille Maurer in his place. As a result, James retired from politics.

== Personal life ==
In January 1954, he married Margaret Higinbothom with whom he had a son, Robert Roy, and a daughter, Mary-Dulany. Mary-Dulany James, who also became a lawyer, was elected to represent district 34A in Cecil and Harford Counties in 1999. William S. James Elementary School in Harford County and the William S. James Senate Office Building in Annapolis were named in his honor even before his death. His contemporaries called him "Bill" and "Billy".

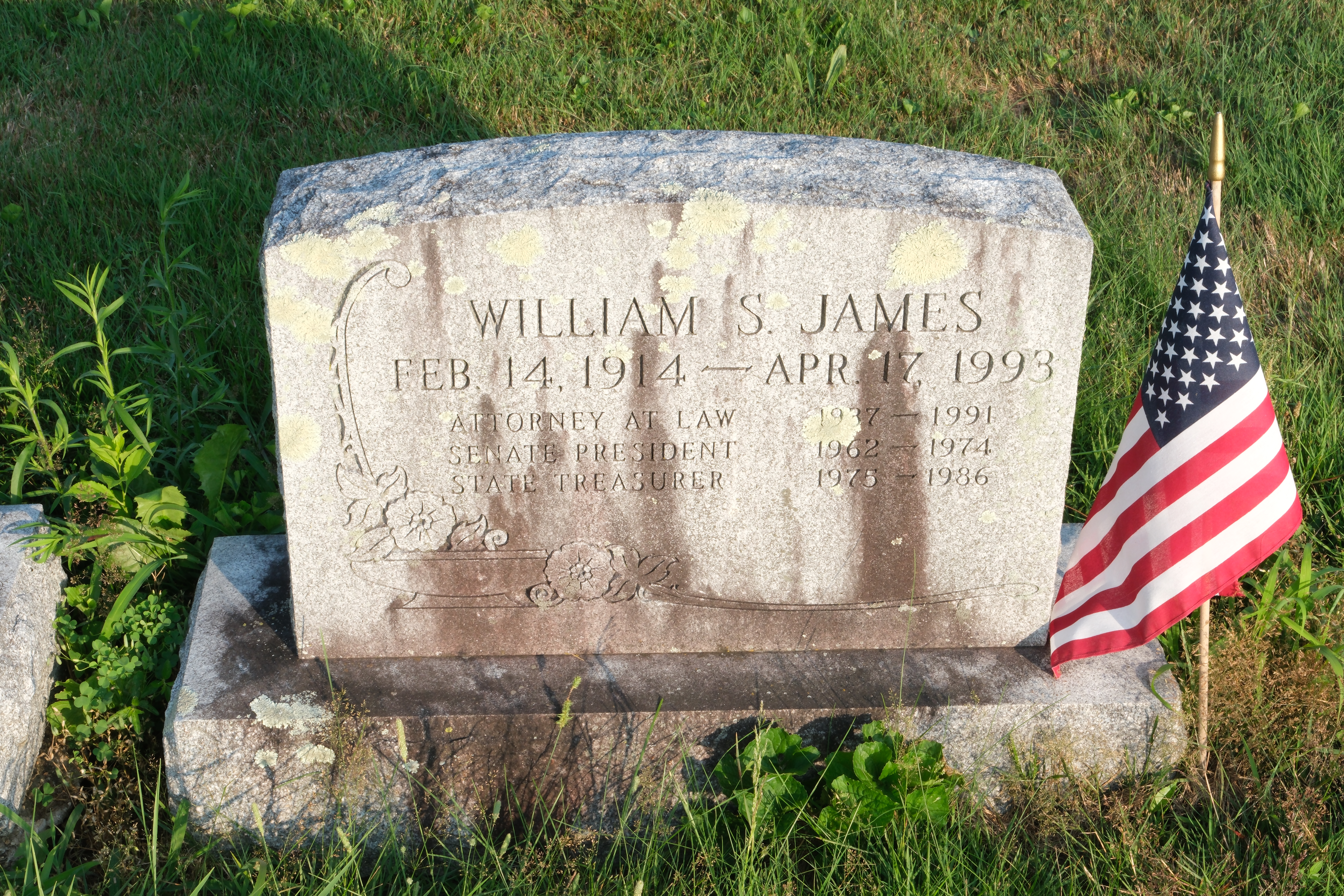
Grave of James at Grove Cemetery, Aberdeen, Maryland

James died on April 17, 1993, at the Lorien-Riverside Nursing Home in Aberdeen. He was remembered by commentators for his dedication to public service and his civility.

Political offices
Preceded by J. Millard Tawes	Treasurer of Maryland; 1975–1987	Succeeded by Lucille Maurer
