= List of former United States representatives (A) =

This is a complete list of former United States representatives whose last names begin with the letter A.

== Number of years and terms the member has served ==
The number of years the representative/delegate has served in Congress indicates the number of terms the representative/delegate has. Note the representative/delegate can also serve non-consecutive terms if the representative/delegate loses election and wins re-election to the House.

- 2 years - 1 or 2 terms
- 4 years - 2 or 3 terms
- 6 years - 3 or 4 terms
- 8 years - 4 or 5 terms
- 10 years - 5 or 6 terms
- 12 years - 6 or 7 terms
- 14 years - 7 or 8 terms
- 16 years - 8 or 9 terms
- 18 years - 9 or 10 terms
- 20 years - 10 or 11 terms
- 22 years - 11 or 12 terms
- 24 years - 12 or 13 terms
- 26 years - 13 or 14 terms
- 28 years - 14 or 15 terms
- 30 years - 15 or 16 terms
- 32 years - 16 or 17 terms
- 34 years - 17 or 18 terms
- 36 years - 18 or 19 terms
- 38 years - 19 or 20 terms
- 40 years - 20 or 21 terms
- 42 years - 21 or 22 terms
- 44 years - 22 or 23 terms
- 46 years - 23 or 24 terms
- 48 years - 24 or 25 terms
- 50 years - 25 or 26 terms
- 52 years - 26 or 27 terms
- 54 years - 27 or 28 terms
- 56 years - 28 or 29 terms
- 58 years - 29 or 30 terms

| Name | Term | State/ Territory | Party | Lifespan |
|---|---|---|---|---|
| Fred G. Aandahl | 1951–1953 | North Dakota | Republican | 1897–1966 |
| Watkins Abbitt | 1948–1973 | Virginia | Democratic | 1908–1998 |
| Joel Abbot | 1817–1825 | Georgia | Democratic-Republican | 1776–1826 |
| Amos Abbott | 1843–1849 | Massachusetts | Whig | 1786–1868 |
| Jo Abbott | 1887–1897 | Texas | Democratic | 1840–1908 |
| Josiah Gardner Abbott | 1876–1877 | Massachusetts | Democratic | 1814–1891 |
| Nehemiah Abbott | 1857–1859 | Maine | Republican | 1804–1877 |
| James Abdnor | 1973–1981 | South Dakota | Republican | 1923–2012 |
| Pete Abele | 1963–1965 | Ohio | Republican | 1916–2000 |
| James Abercrombie | 1851–1855 | Alabama | Whig | 1795–1861 |
| John Abercrombie | 1913–1917 | Alabama | Democratic | 1866–1940 |
| Neil Abercrombie | 1986–1987; 1991–2010 | Hawaii | Democratic | 1938–present |
| Charles Laban Abernethy | 1922–1935 | North Carolina | Democratic | 1872–1955 |
| Thomas Abernethy | 1943–1973 | Mississippi | Democratic | 1903–1998 |
| James Abourezk | 1971–1973 | South Dakota | Democratic | 1931–2023 |
| Ralph Abraham | 2015–2021 | Louisiana | Republican | 1954–present |
| Bella Abzug | 1971–1977 | New York | Democratic | 1920–1998 |
| Aníbal Acevedo Vilá | 2001–2005 | Puerto Rico | Popular Democratic | 1962–present |
| Ernest F. Acheson | 1895–1909 | Pennsylvania | Republican | 1855–1917 |
| Ephraim Acker | 1871–1873 | Pennsylvania | Democratic | 1827–1903 |
| Ernest R. Ackerman | 1919–1931 | New Jersey | Republican | 1863–1931 |
| Gary Ackerman | 1983–2013 | New York | Democratic | 1942–present |
| Joseph H. Acklen | 1878–1881 | Louisiana | Democratic | 1850–1938 |
| E. Ross Adair | 1951–1971 | Indiana | Republican | 1907–1983 |
| J. Leroy Adair | 1933–1937 | Illinois | Democratic | 1887–1956 |
| John Adair | 1831–1833 | Kentucky | Democratic | 1757–1840 |
| John A. M. Adair | 1907–1917 | Indiana | Democratic | 1864–1938 |
| Benjamin Adams | 1816–1821 | Massachusetts | Federalist | 1764–1837 |
| Brock Adams | 1965–1977 | Washington | Democratic | 1927–2004 |
| Charles Francis Adams Sr. | 1859–1861 | Massachusetts | Republican | 1807–1886 |
| Charles H. Adams | 1875–1877 | New York | Republican | 1824–1902 |
| George E. Adams | 1883–1891 | Illinois | Republican | 1840–1917 |
| George Madison Adams | 1867–1875 | Kentucky | Democratic | 1837–1920 |
| Green Adams | 1847–1849 | Kentucky | Whig | 1812–1884 |
| Green Adams | 1859–1861 | Kentucky | Oppositionist | 1812–1884 |
| Henry Cullen Adams | 1903–1906 | Wisconsin | Republican | 1850–1906 |
| John Adams | 1815 | New York | Democratic-Republican | 1778–1854 |
| John Adams | 1833–1835 | New York | Democratic | 1778–1854 |
| John J. Adams | 1883–1887 | New York | Democratic | 1848–1919 |
| John Quincy Adams | 1831–1834 | Massachusetts | National Republican | 1767–1848 |
| John Quincy Adams | 1834–1848 | Massachusetts | Whig | 1767–1848 |
| Parmenio Adams | 1824–1825 | New York | Democratic-Republican | 1776–1832 |
| Parmenio Adams | 1825–1827 | New York | National Republican | 1776–1832 |
| Robert Adams Jr. | 1893–1906 | Pennsylvania | Republican | 1849–1906 |
| Sandy Adams | 2011–2013 | Florida | Republican | 1956–present |
| Sherman Adams | 1945–1947 | New Hampshire | Republican | 1899–1986 |
| Silas Adams | 1893–1895 | Kentucky | Republican | 1839–1896 |
| Stephen Adams | 1845–1847 | Mississippi | Democratic | 1807–1857 |
| Wilbur L. Adams | 1933–1935 | Delaware | Democratic | 1884–1937 |
| William C. Adamson | 1897–1917 | Georgia | Democratic | 1854–1929 |
| Joseph P. Addabbo | 1961–1986 | New York | Democratic | 1925–1986 |
| William Addams | 1825–1829 | Pennsylvania | Democratic | 1777–1858 |
| Hugh J. Addonizio | 1949–1962 | New Jersey | Democratic | 1914–1981 |
| Asa Adgate | 1815–1817 | New York | Democratic-Republican | 1767–1832 |
| Charles Adkins | 1925–1933 | Illinois | Republican | 1863–1941 |
| John Adler | 2009–2011 | New Jersey | Democratic | 1959–2011 |
| Garnett Adrain | 1857–1859 | New Jersey | Democratic | 1815–1878 |
| Garnett Adrain | 1859–1861 | New Jersey | Anti-Lecompton Democratic | 1815–1878 |
| John Alexander Ahl | 1857–1859 | Pennsylvania | Democratic | 1813–1882 |
| D. Wyatt Aiken | 1877–1887 | South Carolina | Democratic | 1828–1887 |
| William Aiken Jr. | 1851–1857 | South Carolina | Democratic | 1806–1887 |
| Wyatt Aiken | 1903–1917 | South Carolina | Democratic | 1863–1923 |
| William D.B. Ainey | 1911–1915 | Pennsylvania | Republican | 1864–1932 |
| George Ainslie | 1879–1883 | Idaho | Democratic | 1838-1913 |
| Lucien Lester Ainsworth | 1875–1877 | Iowa | Democratic | 1831–1902 |
| David D. Aitken | 1893–1897 | Michigan | Republican | 1853–1930 |
| Daniel Akaka | 1977–1990 | Hawaii | Democratic | 1924–2018 |
| Thomas P. Akers | 1856–1857 | Missouri | American | 1828–1877 |
| Theron Akin | 1911–1913 | New York | Progressive Republican | 1855–1933 |
| Todd Akin | 2001–2013 | Missouri | Republican | 1947–2021 |
| Walter H. Albaugh | 1938–1939 | Ohio | Republican | 1890–1942 |
| Carl Albert | 1947–1977 | Oklahoma | Democratic | 1908–2000 |
| William Albert | 1873–1875 | Maryland | Republican | 1816–1879 |
| Nathaniel Albertson | 1849–1851 | Indiana | Democratic | 1800–1863 |
| Donald J. Albosta | 1979–1985 | Michigan | Democratic | 1925–2014 |
| Charles Albright | 1873–1875 | Pennsylvania | Republican | 1830–1880 |
| Charles J. Albright | 1855–1857 | Ohio | Oppositionist | 1816–1883 |
| John D. Alderson | 1889–1895 | West Virginia | Democratic | 1854–1910 |
| Cyrus Aldrich | 1859–1863 | Minnesota | Republican | 1808–1871 |
| J. Frank Aldrich | 1893–1897 | Illinois | Republican | 1853–1933 |
| Nelson W. Aldrich | 1879–1881 | Rhode Island | Republican | 1841–1915 |
| Richard S. Aldrich | 1923–1933 | Rhode Island | Republican | 1884–1941 |
| Truman H. Aldrich | 1896–1897 | Alabama | Republican | 1848–1932 |
| William Aldrich | 1877–1883 | Illinois | Republican | 1820–1885 |
| William F. Aldrich | 1896–1897; 1898–1899; 1900–1901 | Alabama | Republican | 1853–1925 |
| Arthur W. Aleshire | 1937–1939 | Ohio | Democratic | 1900–1940 |
| Adam Rankin Alexander | 1823–1825 | Tennessee | Democratic-Republican | 1781–1848 |
| Adam Rankin Alexander | 1825–1827 | Tennessee | Democratic | 1781–1848 |
| Armstead M. Alexander | 1883–1885 | Missouri | Democratic | 1834–1892 |
| Bill Alexander | 1969–1993 | Arkansas | Democratic | 1934–present |
| De Alva S. Alexander | 1897–1911 | New York | Republican | 1846–1925 |
| Evan Shelby Alexander | 1806–1809 | North Carolina | Democratic-Republican | c. 1767–1809 |
| Henry P. Alexander | 1849–1851 | New York | Whig | 1801–1867 |
| Hugh Quincy Alexander | 1953–1963 | North Carolina | Democratic | 1911–1989 |
| James Alexander Jr. | 1837–1839 | Ohio | Whig | 1789–1846 |
| John Alexander | 1813–1817 | Ohio | Democratic-Republican | 1777–1848 |
| John G. Alexander | 1939–1941 | Minnesota | Republican | 1893–1971 |
| Joshua W. Alexander | 1907–1919 | Missouri | Democratic | 1852–1936 |
| Mark Alexander | 1819–1825 | Virginia | Democratic-Republican | 1792–1883 |
| Mark Alexander | 1825–1833 | Virginia | Democratic | 1792–1883 |
| Nathaniel Alexander | 1803–1805 | North Carolina | Democratic-Republican | 1756–1808 |
| Rodney Alexander | 2003–2004 | Louisiana | Democratic | 1946–present |
| Rodney Alexander | 2004–2013 | Louisiana | Republican | 1946–present |
| Sydenham B. Alexander | 1891–1895 | North Carolina | Democratic | 1840–1921 |
| Dale Alford | 1959–1961 | Arkansas | Independent Democrat | 1916–2000 |
| Dale Alford | 1961–1963 | Arkansas | Democratic | 1916–2000 |
| Julius C. Alford | 1837 | Georgia | National Republican | 1799–1863 |
| Julius C. Alford | 1839–1841 | Georgia | Whig | 1799–1863 |
| Bruce Alger | 1955–1965 | Texas | Republican | 1918–2015 |
| Chilton Allan | 1831–1835 | Kentucky | National Republican | 1786–1858 |
| Chilton Allan | 1835–1837 | Kentucky | Whig | 1786–1858 |
| Wayne Allard | 1991–1997 | Colorado | Republican | 1943–present |
| A. Leonard Allen | 1937–1953 | Louisiana | Democratic | 1891–1969 |
| Alfred G. Allen | 1911–1917 | Ohio | Democratic | 1867–1932 |
| Amos L. Allen | 1899–1911 | Maine | Republican | 1837–1911 |
| Charles Allen | 1849–1853 | Massachusetts | Free Soiler | 1797–1869 |
| Charles H. Allen | 1885–1889 | Massachusetts | Republican | 1848–1934 |
| Clarence Emir Allen | 1896–1897 | Utah | Republican | 1852–1932 |
| Clifford Allen | 1975–1978 | Tennessee | Democratic | 1912–1978 |
| Edward P. Allen | 1887–1891 | Michigan | Republican | 1839–1909 |
| Elisha H. Allen | 1841–1843 | Maine | Whig | 1804–1883 |
| George Allen | 1991–1993 | Virginia | Republican | 1952–present |
| Heman Allen | 1817–1818 | Vermont | Democratic-Republican | 1779–1852 |
| Heman Allen | 1831–1837 | Vermont | National Republican | 1777–1844 |
| Heman Allen | 1837–1839 | Vermont | Whig | 1777–1844 |
| Henry C. Allen | 1905–1907 | New Jersey | Republican | 1872–1942 |
| Henry D. Allen | 1899–1903 | Kentucky | Democratic | 1854–1924 |
| James C. Allen | 1853–1856; 1856–1857; 1863–1865 | Illinois | Democratic | 1822–1912 |
| John B. Allen | 1889 | Washington | Republican | 1845-1903 |
| John Allen | 1797–1799 | Connecticut | Federalist | 1763–1812 |
| John Clayton Allen | 1925–1933 | Illinois | Republican | 1860–1939 |
| John J. Allen | 1833–1835 | Virginia | National Republican | 1797–1871 |
| John J. Allen Jr. | 1947–1959 | California | Republican | 1899–1995 |
| John Mills Allen | 1885–1901 | Mississippi | Democratic | 1846–1917 |
| John W. Allen | 1837–1841 | Ohio | Whig | 1802–1887 |
| Joseph Allen | 1810–1811 | Massachusetts | Federalist | 1749–1827 |
| Judson Allen | 1839–1841 | New York | Democratic | 1797–1880 |
| Leo E. Allen | 1933–1961 | Illinois | Republican | 1898–1973 |
| Nathaniel Allen | 1819–1821 | New York | Democratic-Republican | 1780–1832 |
| Robert Allen | 1819–1825 | Tennessee | Democratic-Republican | 1778–1844 |
| Robert Allen | 1825–1827 | Tennessee | Democratic | 1778–1844 |
| Robert Allen | 1827–1833 | Virginia | Democratic | 1794–1859 |
| Robert E. Lee Allen | 1923–1925 | West Virginia | Democratic | 1865–1951 |
| Robert G. Allen | 1937–1941 | Pennsylvania | Democratic | 1902–1963 |
| Samuel Clesson Allen | 1817–1825 | Massachusetts | Federalist | 1772–1842 |
| Samuel Clesson Allen | 1825–1829 | Massachusetts | National Republican | 1772–1842 |
| Thomas Allen | 1881–1882 | Missouri | Democratic | 1813–1882 |
| Tom Allen | 1997–2009 | Maine | Democratic | 1945–present |
| William Allen | 1833–1835 | Ohio | Democratic | 1803–1879 |
| William Allen | 1859–1863 | Ohio | Democratic | 1827–1881 |
| William F. Allen | 1937–1939 | Delaware | Democratic | 1883–1946 |
| William J. Allen | 1862–1865 | Illinois | Democratic | 1829–1901 |
| Willis Allen | 1851–1855 | Illinois | Democratic | 1806–1859 |
| John B. Alley | 1859–1867 | Massachusetts | Republican | 1817–1896 |
| Miles C. Allgood | 1923–1935 | Alabama | Democratic | 1878–1977 |
| James Allison Jr. | 1823–1825 | Pennsylvania | Democratic-Republican | 1772–1854 |
| John Allison | 1851–1853 | Pennsylvania | Whig | 1812–1878 |
| John Allison | 1855–1857 | Pennsylvania | Oppositionist | 1812–1878 |
| Robert Allison | 1831–1833 | Pennsylvania | Anti-Masonic | 1777–1840 |
| William B. Allison | 1863–1871 | Iowa | Republican | 1829–1908 |
| Colin Allred | 2019–2025 | Texas | Democratic | 1983–present |
| Edward B. Almon | 1915–1933 | Alabama | Democratic | 1860–1933 |
| J. Lindsay Almond | 1946–1948 | Virginia | Democratic | 1898–1986 |
| Lemuel J. Alston | 1807–1811 | South Carolina | Democratic-Republican | 1760–1836 |
| William J. Alston | 1849–1851 | Alabama | Whig | 1800–1876 |
| Willis Alston | 1799–1815 | North Carolina | Democratic-Republican | 1769–1837 |
| Willis Alston | 1825–1831 | North Carolina | Democratic | 1769–1837 |
| Jason Altmire | 2007–2013 | Pennsylvania | Democratic | 1968–present |
| James C. Alvord | 1839 | Massachusetts | Whig | 1808–1839 |
| Justin Amash | 2011–2019 | Michigan | Republican | 1980–present |
| Justin Amash | 2019–2020 | Michigan | Independent | 1980–present |
| Justin Amash | 2020–2021 | Michigan | Libertarian | 1980–present |
| Jacob A. Ambler | 1869–1873 | Ohio | Republican | 1829–1906 |
| Jerome Ambro | 1975–1981 | New York | Democratic | 1928–1993 |
| Lemuel Amerman | 1891–1893 | Pennsylvania | Democratic | 1846–1897 |
| Butler Ames | 1903–1913 | Massachusetts | Republican | 1871–1954 |
| Fisher Ames | 1789–1795 | Massachusetts | Pro-Administration | 1758–1808 |
| Fisher Ames | 1795–1797 | Massachusetts | Federalist | 1758–1808 |
| Oakes Ames | 1863–1873 | Massachusetts | Republican | 1804–1873 |
| Thomas Ryum Amlie | 1931–1933 | Wisconsin | Republican | 1897–1973 |
| Thomas Ryum Amlie | 1935–1939 | Wisconsin | Progressive | 1897–1973 |
| Joseph S. Ammerman | 1977–1979 | Pennsylvania | Democratic | 1924–1993 |
| Sydenham E. Ancona | 1861–1867 | Pennsylvania | Democratic | 1824–1913 |
| H. Carl Andersen | 1939–1963 | Minnesota | Republican | 1897–1978 |
| Albert R. Anderson | 1887–1889 | Iowa | Independent Republican | 1837–1898 |
| Carl C. Anderson | 1909–1912 | Ohio | Democratic | 1877–1912 |
| Chapman L. Anderson | 1887–1891 | Mississippi | Democratic | 1845–1924 |
| C. Arthur Anderson | 1937–1941 | Missouri | Democratic | 1899–1977 |
| Charles Marley Anderson | 1885–1887 | Ohio | Democratic | 1845–1908 |
| Clinton Anderson | 1941–1945 | New Mexico | Democratic | 1895–1975 |
| George A. Anderson | 1887–1889 | Illinois | Democratic | 1853–1896 |
| George Washington Anderson | 1865–1869 | Missouri | Republican | 1832–1902 |
| Glenn M. Anderson | 1969–1993 | California | Democratic | 1913–1994 |
| Hugh J. Anderson | 1837–1841 | Maine | Democratic | 1801–1881 |
| Isaac Anderson | 1803–1807 | Pennsylvania | Democratic-Republican | 1760–1838 |
| Jack Z. Anderson | 1939–1953 | California | Republican | 1904–1981 |
| James Patton Anderson | 1855–1857 | Washington | Democratic | 1822-1872 |
| John Anderson | 1825–1833 | Maine | Democratic | 1792–1853 |
| John Alexander Anderson | 1879–1887 | Kansas | Republican | 1834–1892 |
| John Alexander Anderson | 1887–1889 | Kansas | Independent Republican | 1834–1892 |
| John Alexander Anderson | 1889–1891 | Kansas | Republican | 1834–1892 |
| John B. Anderson | 1961–1981 | Illinois | Republican | 1922–2017 |
| Joseph H. Anderson | 1843–1847 | New York | Democratic | 1800–1870 |
| Josiah M. Anderson | 1849–1851 | Tennessee | Whig | 1807–1861 |
| LeRoy H. Anderson | 1957–1961 | Montana | Democratic | 1906–1991 |
| Lucien Anderson | 1863–1865 | Kentucky | Unconditional Unionist | 1824–1898 |
| Richard C. Anderson Jr. | 1817–1821 | Kentucky | Democratic-Republican | 1788–1826 |
| Samuel Anderson | 1827–1829 | Pennsylvania | National Republican | 1773–1850 |
| Simeon H. Anderson | 1839–1840 | Kentucky | Whig | 1802–1840 |
| Sydney Anderson | 1911–1925 | Minnesota | Republican | 1881–1948 |
| Thomas L. Anderson | 1857–1859 | Missouri | American | 1808–1885 |
| Thomas L. Anderson | 1859–1861 | Missouri | Independent Democrat | 1808–1885 |
| William Anderson | 1809–1815; 1817–1819 | Pennsylvania | Democratic-Republican | 1762–1829 |
| William B. Anderson | 1875–1877 | Illinois | Independent | 1830–1901 |
| William Clayton Anderson | 1859–1861 | Kentucky | Oppositionist | 1826–1861 |
| William Coleman Anderson | 1895–1897 | Tennessee | Republican | 1853–1902 |
| William R. Anderson | 1965–1973 | Tennessee | Democratic | 1921–2007 |
| August H. Andresen | 1925–1933; 1935–1958 | Minnesota | Republican | 1890–1958 |
| A. Piatt Andrew | 1921–1936 | Massachusetts | Republican | 1873–1936 |
| John F. Andrew | 1889–1893 | Massachusetts | Democratic | 1850–1895 |
| Charles Andrews | 1851–1852 | Maine | Democratic | 1814–1852 |
| Elizabeth B. Andrews | 1972–1973 | Alabama | Democratic | 1911–2002 |
| George Rex Andrews | 1849–1851 | New York | Whig | 1808–1873 |
| George W. Andrews | 1944–1971 | Alabama | Democratic | 1906–1971 |
| Glenn Andrews | 1965–1967 | Alabama | Republican | 1909–2008 |
| Ike Franklin Andrews | 1973–1985 | North Carolina | Democratic | 1925–2010 |
| John T. Andrews | 1837–1839 | New York | Democratic | 1803–1894 |
| Landaff Andrews | 1839–1843 | Kentucky | Whig | 1803–1887 |
| Mark Andrews | 1963–1981 | North Dakota | Republican | 1926–2020 |
| Michael A. Andrews | 1983–1995 | Texas | Democratic | 1944–present |
| Rob Andrews | 1990-2014 | New Jersey | Democratic | 1957–present |
| Samuel G. Andrews | 1857–1859 | New York | Republican | 1796–1863 |
| Sherlock James Andrews | 1841–1843 | Ohio | Whig | 1801–1880 |
| Thomas Andrews | 1991–1995 | Maine | Democratic | 1953–present |
| Walter G. Andrews | 1931–1949 | New York | Republican | 1889–1949 |
| William E. Andrews | 1895–1897; 1919–1923 | Nebraska | Republican | 1854–1942 |
| William Henry Andrews | 1905–1912 | New Mexico | Republican | 1846-1919 |
| William Noble Andrews | 1919–1921 | Maryland | Republican | 1876–1937 |
| John Emory Andrus | 1905–1913 | New York | Republican | 1841–1934 |
| Victor Anfuso | 1951–1953; 1955–1963 | New York | Democratic | 1905–1966 |
| William G. Angel | 1825–1827 | New York | National Republican | 1790–1858 |
| William G. Angel | 1829–1833 | New York | Democratic | 1790–1858 |
| Homer D. Angell | 1939–1955 | Oregon | Republican | 1875–1968 |
| Frank Annunzio | 1965–1993 | Illinois | Democratic | 1915–2001 |
| Timothy T. Ansberry | 1907–1915 | Ohio | Democratic | 1871–1943 |
| Martin C. Ansorge | 1921–1923 | New York | Republican | 1882–1967 |
| Beryl Anthony Jr. | 1979–1993 | Arkansas | Democratic | 1938–2025 |
| Daniel R. Anthony Jr. | 1907–1929 | Kansas | Republican | 1870–1931 |
| Joseph B. Anthony | 1833–1837 | Pennsylvania | Democratic | 1795–1851 |
| Edwin Le Roy Antony | 1892–1893 | Texas | Democratic | 1852–1913 |
| Henry H. Aplin | 1901–1903 | Michigan | Republican | 1841–1910 |
| Stewart H. Appleby | 1925–1927 | New Jersey | Republican | 1890–1964 |
| T. Frank Appleby | 1921–1923 | New Jersey | Republican | 1864–1924 |
| Douglas Applegate | 1977–1995 | Ohio | Democratic | 1928–2021 |
| John Appleton | 1851–1853 | Maine | Democratic | 1815–1864 |
| Nathan Appleton | 1831–1833 | Massachusetts | National Republican | 1779–1861 |
| Nathan Appleton | 1842 | Massachusetts | Whig | 1779–1861 |
| William Appleton | 1851–1855 | Massachusetts | Whig | 1786–1862 |
| William Appleton | 1861 | Massachusetts | Constitutional Unionist | 1786–1862 |
| Lewis D. Apsley | 1893–1897 | Massachusetts | Republican | 1852–1925 |
| Bill Archer | 1971–2001 | Texas | Republican | 1928–2026 |
| John Archer | 1801–1807 | Maryland | Democratic-Republican | 1741–1810 |
| Stevenson Archer | 1811–1817; 1819–1821 | Maryland | Democratic-Republican | 1786–1848 |
| Stevenson Archer | 1867–1875 | Maryland | Democratic | 1827–1898 |
| William S. Archer | 1820–1825 | Virginia | Democratic-Republican | 1789–1855 |
| William S. Archer | 1825–1835 | Virginia | Democratic | 1789–1855 |
| Mike Arcuri | 2007–2011 | New York | Democratic | 1959–present |
| Leslie C. Arends | 1935–1974 | Illinois | Republican | 1895–1985 |
| Henry M. Arens | 1933–1935 | Minnesota | Farmer-Labor | 1873–1963 |
| Samuel S. Arentz | 1921–1923; 1925–1933 | Nevada | Republican | 1879–1934 |
| Dick Armey | 1985–2003 | Texas | Republican | 1940–present |
| Robert Franklin Armfield | 1879–1883 | North Carolina | Democratic | 1829–1898 |
| James Armstrong | 1793–1795 | Pennsylvania | Pro-Administration | 1748–1828 |
| Kelly Armstrong | 2019–2024 | North Dakota | Republican | 1976–present |
| Moses K. Armstrong | 1871–1875 | Dakota | Democratic | 1832-1906 |
| Orland K. Armstrong | 1951–1953 | Missouri | Republican | 1893–1987 |
| William Armstrong | 1825–1833 | Virginia | National Republican | 1782–1865 |
| William Hepburn Armstrong | 1869–1871 | Pennsylvania | Republican | 1824–1919 |
| William L. Armstrong | 1973–1979 | Colorado | Republican | 1937–2016 |
| Samuel Mayes Arnell | 1866–1867 | Tennessee | Unionist | 1833–1903 |
| Samuel Mayes Arnell | 1867–1871 | Tennessee | Republican | 1833–1903 |
| Benedict Arnold | 1829–1831 | New York | National Republican | 1780–1849 |
| Isaac N. Arnold | 1861–1865 | Illinois | Republican | 1815–1884 |
| Laurence F. Arnold | 1937–1943 | Illinois | Democratic | 1891–1966 |
| Lemuel H. Arnold | 1845–1847 | Rhode Island | Whig | 1792–1852 |
| Marshall Arnold | 1891–1895 | Missouri | Democratic | 1845–1913 |
| Samuel Arnold | 1857–1859 | Connecticut | Democratic | 1806–1869 |
| Samuel W. Arnold | 1943–1949 | Missouri | Republican | 1879–1961 |
| Thomas Dickens Arnold | 1831–1833 | Tennessee | National Republican | 1798–1870 |
| Thomas Dickens Arnold | 1841–1843 | Tennessee | Whig | 1798–1870 |
| Warren O. Arnold | 1887–1891; 1895–1897 | Rhode Island | Republican | 1839–1910 |
| William C. Arnold | 1895–1899 | Pennsylvania | Republican | 1851–1906 |
| William W. Arnold | 1923–1935 | Illinois | Democratic | 1877–1957 |
| John Arnot Jr. | 1883–1886 | New York | Democratic | 1831–1886 |
| Archibald Hunter Arrington | 1841–1845 | North Carolina | Democratic | 1809–1872 |
| William Evans Arthur | 1871–1875 | Kentucky | Democratic | 1825–1897 |
| Michael Woolston Ash | 1835–1837 | Pennsylvania | Democratic | 1789–1858 |
| Jean Spencer Ashbrook | 1982–1983 | Ohio | Republican | 1934–present |
| John M. Ashbrook | 1961–1982 | Ohio | Republican | 1928–1982 |
| William A. Ashbrook | 1907–1921; 1935–1940 | Ohio | Democratic | 1867–1940 |
| John Baptist Ashe | 1790–1793 | North Carolina | Anti-Administration | 1748–1802 |
| John Baptista Ashe | 1843–1845 | Tennessee | Whig | 1810–1857 |
| Thomas Samuel Ashe | 1873–1877 | North Carolina | Democratic | 1812–1887 |
| William S. Ashe | 1849–1855 | North Carolina | Democratic | 1814–1862 |
| Brad Ashford | 2015–2017 | Nebraska | Democratic | 1949–2022 |
| Delos R. Ashley | 1865–1869 | Nevada | Republican | 1828–1873 |
| Henry Ashley | 1825–1827 | New York | Democratic | 1778–1829 |
| James Mitchell Ashley | 1859–1869 | Ohio | Republican | 1824–1896 |
| Thomas L. Ashley | 1955–1981 | Ohio | Democratic | 1923–2010 |
| William H. Ashley | 1831–1837 | Missouri | Democratic | 1778–1838 |
| John D. Ashmore | 1859–1860 | South Carolina | Democratic | 1819–1871 |
| Robert T. Ashmore | 1953–1969 | South Carolina | Democratic | 1904–1989 |
| George Ashmun | 1845–1851 | Massachusetts | Whig | 1804–1870 |
| Joel Funk Asper | 1869–1871 | Missouri | Republican | 1822–1872 |
| Les Aspin | 1971–1993 | Wisconsin | Democratic | 1938–1995 |
| Wayne N. Aspinall | 1949–1973 | Colorado | Democratic | 1896–1983 |
| James Benjamin Aswell | 1913–1931 | Louisiana | Democratic | 1869–1931 |
| Charles G. Atherton | 1837–1843 | New Hampshire | Democratic | 1804–1853 |
| Charles Humphrey Atherton | 1815–1817 | New Hampshire | Federalist | 1773–1853 |
| Gibson Atherton | 1879–1883 | Ohio | Democratic | 1831–1887 |
| William O. Atkeson | 1921–1923 | Missouri | Republican | 1854–1931 |
| Chester G. Atkins | 1985–1993 | Massachusetts | Democratic | 1948–present |
| John DeWitt Clinton Atkins | 1857–1859; 1873–1883 | Tennessee | Democratic | 1825–1908 |
| Archibald Atkinson | 1843–1849 | Virginia | Democratic | 1792–1872 |
| Eugene Atkinson | 1979–1981 | Pennsylvania | Democratic | 1927–2016 |
| Eugene Atkinson | 1981–1983 | Pennsylvania | Republican | 1927–2016 |
| George W. Atkinson | 1890–1891 | West Virginia | Republican | 1845–1925 |
| Louis E. Atkinson | 1883–1893 | Pennsylvania | Republican | 1841–1910 |
| Richard Merrill Atkinson | 1937–1939 | Tennessee | Democratic | 1894–1947 |
| John W. Atwater | 1899–1901 | North Carolina | Independent Populist | 1840–1910 |
| David Atwood | 1870–1871 | Wisconsin | Republican | 1815–1889 |
| Harrison H. Atwood | 1895–1897 | Massachusetts | Republican | 1863–1954 |
| James C. Auchincloss | 1943–1965 | New Jersey | Republican | 1885–1976 |
| Les AuCoin | 1975–1993 | Oregon | Democratic | 1942–present |
| Oscar L. Auf der Heide | 1925–1935 | New Jersey | Democratic | 1874–1945 |
| Albert E. Austin | 1939–1941 | Connecticut | Republican | 1877–1942 |
| Archibald Austin | 1817–1819 | Virginia | Democratic-Republican | 1772–1837 |
| Richard W. Austin | 1909–1919 | Tennessee | Republican | 1857–1919 |
| Steve Austria | 2009–2013 | Ohio | Republican | 1958–present |
| Thomas H. Averett | 1849–1853 | Virginia | Democratic | 1800–1855 |
| John T. Averill | 1871–1875 | Minnesota | Republican | 1825–1889 |
| Daniel Avery | 1811–1815; 1816–1817 | New York | Democratic-Republican | 1766–1842 |
| John Avery | 1893–1897 | Michigan | Republican | 1824–1914 |
| William H. Avery | 1955–1965 | Kansas | Republican | 1911–2009 |
| William Tecumsah Avery | 1857–1861 | Tennessee | Democratic | 1819–1880 |
| Samuel B. Avis | 1913–1915 | West Virginia | Republican | 1872–1924 |
| Cindy Axne | 2019–2023 | Iowa | Democratic | 1965–present |
| Samuel Beach Axtell | 1867–1871 | California | Democratic | 1819–1891 |
| John Bancker Aycrigg | 1837–1839; 1841–1843 | New Jersey | Whig | 1798–1856 |
| Richard S. Ayer | 1870–1871 | Virginia | Republican | 1829–1896 |
| Roy E. Ayers | 1933–1937 | Montana | Democratic | 1882–1955 |
| Steven Beckwith Ayres | 1911–1913 | New York | Independent Democrat | 1861–1929 |
| William Augustus Ayres | 1915–1921; 1923–1934 | Kansas | Democratic | 1867–1952 |
| William Hanes Ayres | 1951–1971 | Ohio | Republican | 1916–2000 |
