= Stevenson A. Williams =

American politician (1851–1932)

Stevenson Archer Williams
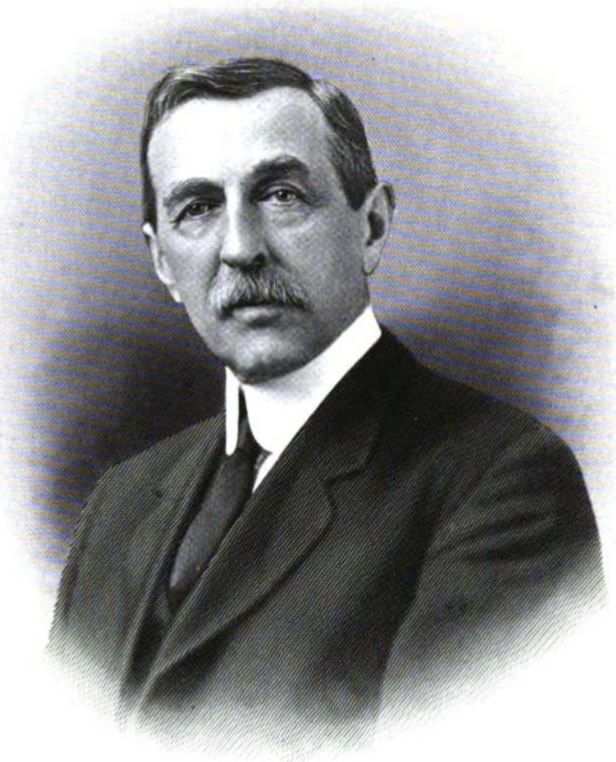

Member of the Maryland Senate
- In office 1898–1901
- Preceded by: Charles W. Michael
- Succeeded by: Thomas H. Robinson
- Constituency: Harford County

Personal details
- Born: May 6, 1851 New York City, New York, U.S.
- Died: February 20, 1932 (aged 80) Bel Air, Maryland, U.S.
- Resting place: Churchville Presbyterian Church; Churchville, Maryland, U.S.
- Party: Republican
- Spouse: Ariel Elizabeth Streett (m. 1875)
- Children: 4
- Relatives: Stevenson Archer (uncle); Stevenson Archer (grandfather); John Archer (great-grandfather)
- Education: Princeton University (AB, MA); University of Maryland School of Law (LLB)
- Occupation: Politician; businessman; lawyer
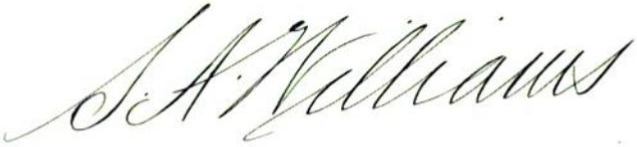
- Signature

Stevenson Archer Williams (May 6, 1851 – February 20, 1932) was an American politician and businessman. He served in the Maryland Senate in 1898 and 1900–1901, and was an unsuccessful candidate for governor in the 1903 Maryland gubernatorial election.

== Early life ==
Stevenson Archer Williams was born on May 6, 1851, at Brooklyn Naval Hospital in New York City, New York, to Harriet Hays (née Archer) and Lewis Jeffery Williams. His father was the medical director in the United States Navy. His grandfather was Stevenson Archer, member of the U.S. House of Representatives and chief judge of the Maryland Court of Appeals. His great-grandfather was John Archer, a member of the U.S. House of Representatives. His uncle was Stevenson Archer, a U.S. Congressman.

Williams attended private schools. He graduated with a Bachelor of Arts and Master of Arts from College of New Jersey (later Princeton University) in 1870 or 1872. In 1873, Williams graduated from the University of Maryland School of Law with a Bachelor of Laws. St. John's College in Annapolis, Maryland gave Williams an honorary Doctor of Laws in 1899.

== Career ==
After graduating in 1873, Williams started practicing law in Bel Air, Maryland. From 1880 to 1882, he served as school commissioner of Harford County by appointment of the circuit court. In 1893, Williams became president of the Harford National Bank of Bel Air.

Williams was a Republican. In 1897, Williams was elected to the Maryland Senate, representing Harford County. He served from 1898 to 1901. He was nominated by his party for governor in the 1903 Maryland gubernatorial election, losing to Edwin Warfield. In 1914, Williams was appointed a member of the Maryland State Board of Bar Examiners and stayed in that role until he resigned in 1921. He was also the president of the Maryland State Bar Association. He served on the Maryland Council of Defense from 1917 to 1920. He also served as the director of the Bel Air Electric Company.

== Personal life ==
Williams married Ariel Elizabeth Streett, daughter of John Rush Streett, of Harford County on March 31, 1875. They had four children: Elise, Harriet A., Elizabeth Rush and Lewis J. Williams. He was an Episcopalian.

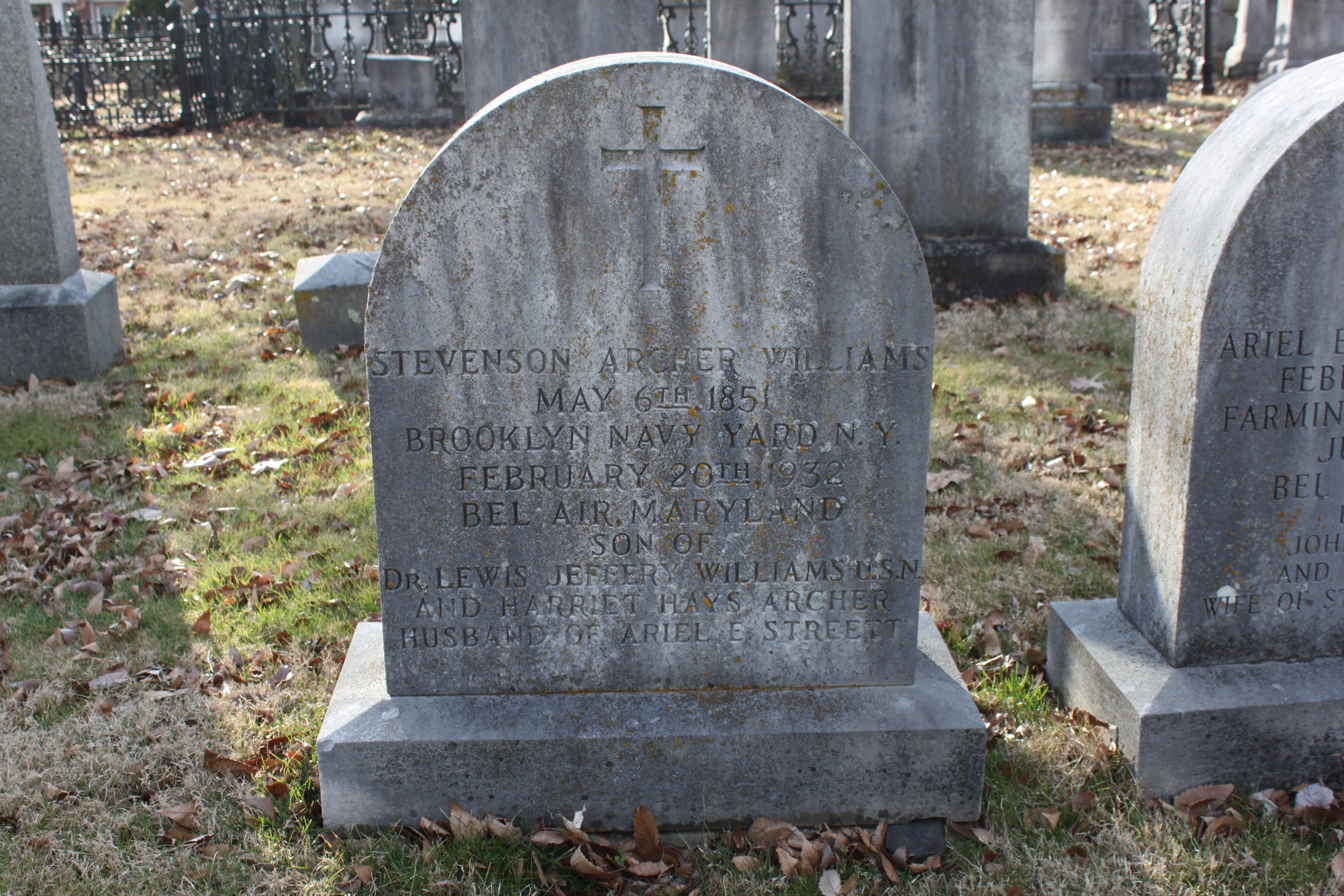
Grave of Williams in Churchville Presbyterian Church cemetery

Williams died on February 20, 1932, at his home in Bel Air. He was buried in the Churchville Presbyterian Church cemetery.
