= Stevenson Archer =

Stevenson Archer may refer to:

- Stevenson Archer (politician, born 1786) (1786–1848), American politician, Congressman and judge from Maryland
- Stevenson Archer (politician, born 1827) (1827–1898), American politician, Congressman from Maryland, son of the above
