= Medical Hall Historic District =

Historic house in Maryland, United States

- U.S. National Register of Historic Places
- U.S. Historic district
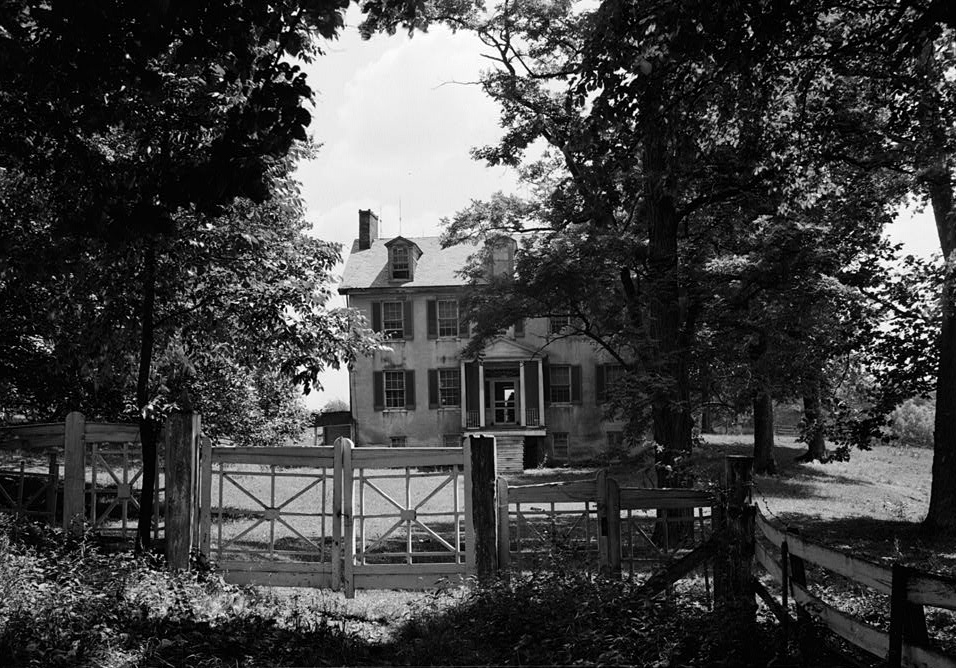
- Medical Hall in 1936

- Location within Maryland Location within the United States
- Nearest city: Churchville, Maryland
- Coordinates: 39°34′24″N 76°16′20″W
- Area: 208 acres (84 ha)
- Built: 1777
- Architectural style: Georgian-Federal Vernacular
- NRHP reference No.: 73000926
- Added to NRHP: August 28, 1973

Medical Hall Historic District is a historic home and national historic district near Churchville, Harford County, Maryland, United States. The home was constructed of stuccoed stone between 1825 and 1840 and is five bays long, two bays wide, and two and a half stories high. The façade features a centrally placed door with sidelights and a rectangular transom subdivided in a radiating pattern. Also on the property is a stone springhouse which 20th century owners have converted into a pumphouse and a stone cottage believed to be a 19th-century tenant house. The property is associated with John Archer (1741–1810), the first man to receive a degree in medicine in America. One of his sons was a Congressman, judge of the circuit court, and Chief Justice of Maryland Stevenson Archer (1786–1848).

It was added to the National Register of Historic Places in 1973.
