= John Miller Turpin Finney =

United States Army general (1863–1942)

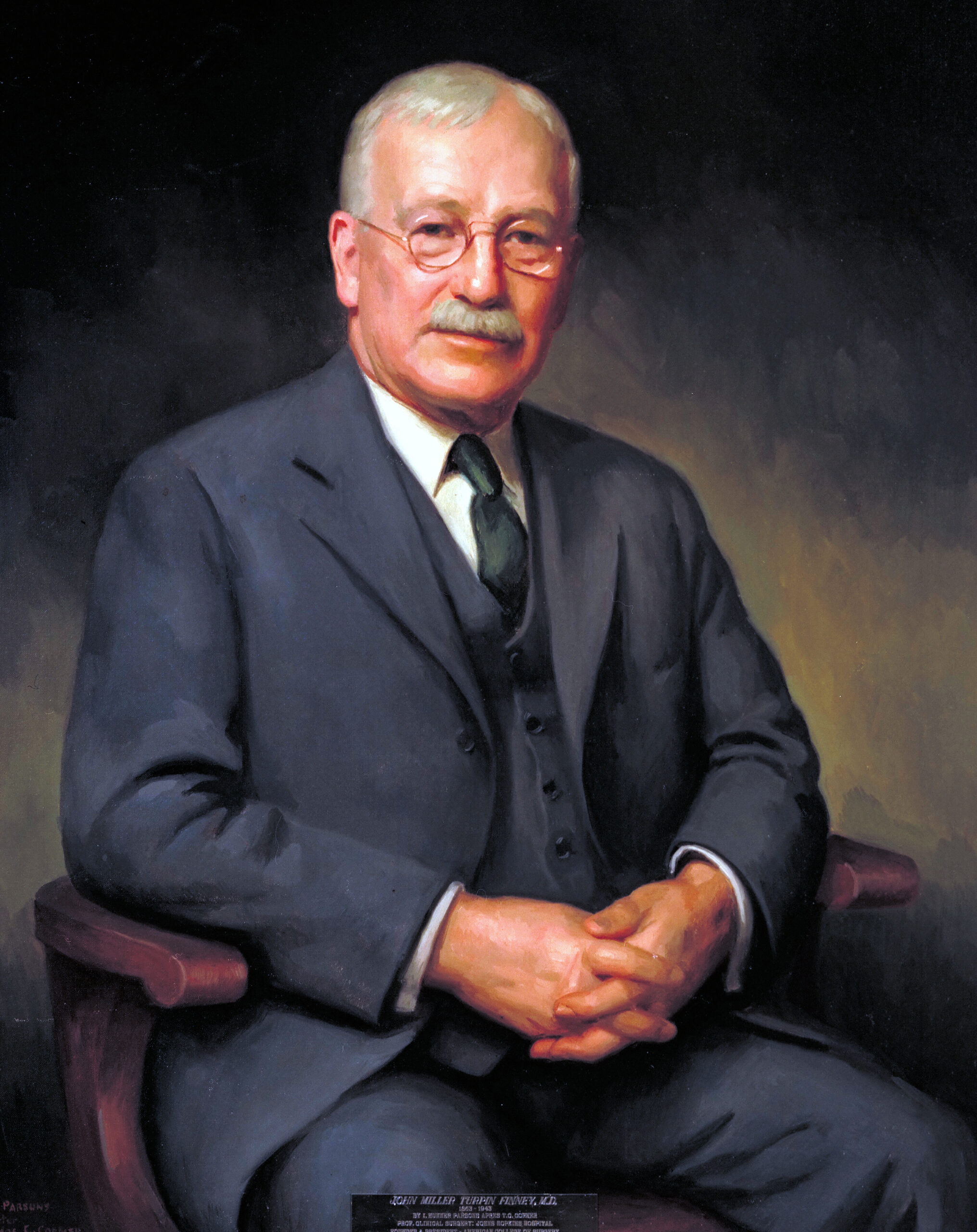
- Portrait of Finney by Isabella Hunner Parsons (1926)
- Born: June 20, 1863; Natchez, Mississippi, U.S.
- Died: May 30, 1942 (aged 78); Baltimore, Maryland, U.S.
- Burial place: Churchville Presbyterian Church; Churchville, Maryland, U.S.
- Spouse: Mary Elizabeth Gross (m. 1892)
- Children: 4
- Military career
- Allegiance: United States
- Branch: United States Army
- Service years: 1898–19??
- Rank: Brigadier general
- Conflicts: World War I
- Awards: Order of the Crown; Legion of Honour

Signature
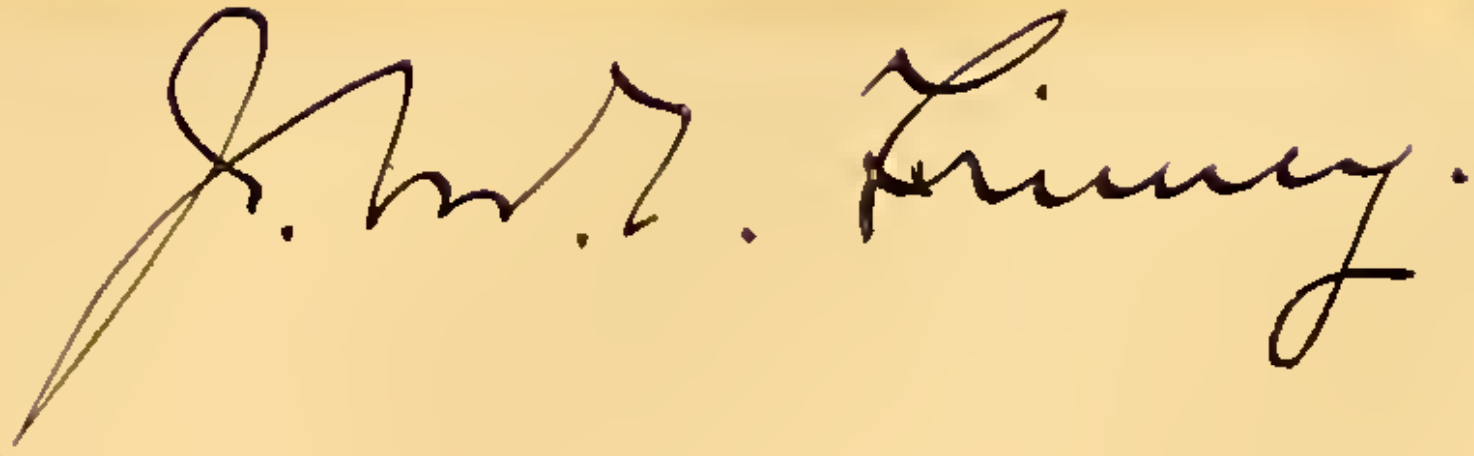

John Miller Turpin Finney (June 20, 1863 – May 30, 1942) was an American surgeon and academic who also served as a brigadier general during World War I. He is best remembered for serving as the first president of the American College of Surgeons.

== Biography ==
Finney was born on June 20, 1863, on a plantation near Natchez, Mississippi. His father, Ebenezer Dickey Finney, was a Presbyterian minister, and his mother, Annie Parker Finney, died shortly after his birth. His grandfather William D. Finney was pastor of Churchville Presbyterian Church in Churchville, Maryland. Finney attended Princeton University and graduated on his twenty-first birthday. He then attended and graduated from Harvard Medical School. he played on the football teams of both schools.

After interning at Massachusetts General Hospital, Finney joined the Johns Hopkins University in 1889 as a member of its surgical staff. He worked alongside William Stewart Halsted, became a professor at the university, and started the school's dispensary. He had a good reputation and received patients from across the United States and even had house calls to the White House. Upon Woodrow Wilson's resignation as Princeton University's president in 1911, the school's trustees unanimously chose Finney to succeed him, though Finney declined the appointment. In May 1913, he became the first president of the American College of Surgeons and served in that position for three years.

Finney had been commissioned as a major in the Maryland Army National Guard. During World War I, he commanded the Johns-Hopkins Medical Unit, Base Hospital Number Eighteen while at the rank of colonel. Upon his promotion to brigadier general on October 1, 1918, he became the American Expeditionary Forces' chief consultant in surgery. His method for treating duodenal ulcers became the standard practice. For his efforts, he received the Order of the Crown from Belgium and the Legion of Honour from France.

Finney wrote A Surgeon's Life, published by G. P. Putnam's Sons, in 1940.

== Personal life ==
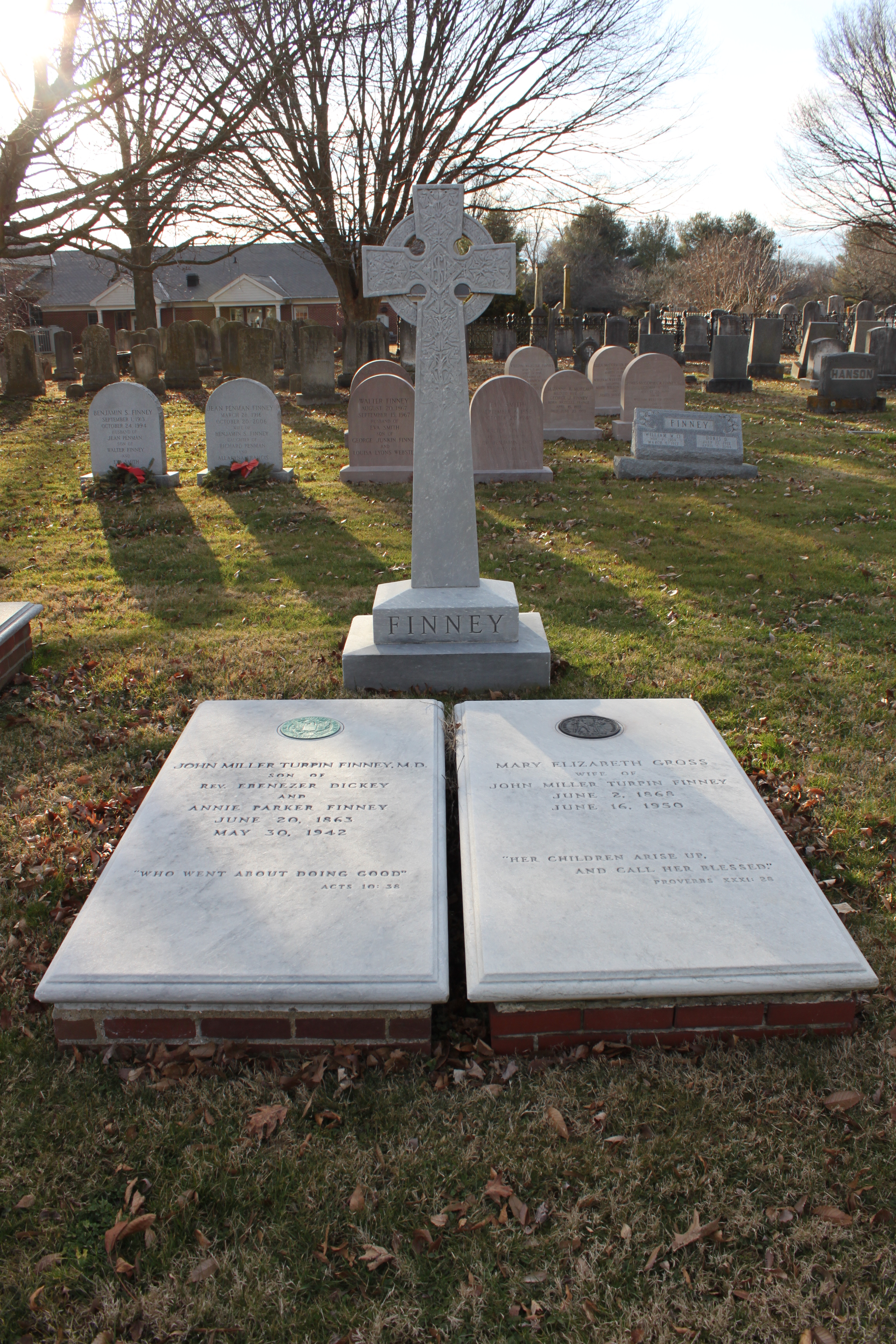
Grave of Finney and his wife in Churchville Presbyterian Church cemetery

Finney married Mary Elizabeth Gross in 1892, and they had four children together. He was "a very religious man" and was active in the Presbyterian Church.

He died on May 30, 1942. He was buried at Churchville Presbyterian Church in Churchville, Maryland.
