= Philip Reed (politician) =

American politician

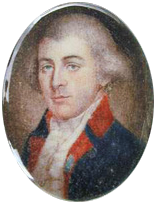

Member of the U.S. House of Representatives from Maryland's 6th district
- In office March 19, 1822 – March 3, 1823
- Preceded by: Jeremiah Cosden
- Succeeded by: George Edward Mitchell

Member of the U.S. House of Representatives from Maryland's 7th district
- In office March 4, 1817 – March 3, 1819
- Preceded by: Robert Wright
- Succeeded by: Stevenson Archer

United States Senator from Maryland
- In office November 25, 1806 – March 4, 1813
- Preceded by: Robert Wright
- Succeeded by: Robert H. Goldsborough

Personal details
- Born: 1760 near Chestertown, Province of Maryland, British America
- Died: November 2, 1829 (aged 68–69) Huntingtown, Maryland, U.S.
- Party: Democratic-Republican

Philip Reed (1760 – November 2, 1829) was a United States senator representing Maryland from 1806 to 1813.

== Early life ==
Born near Chestertown in the Province of Maryland in 1760, Reed completed preparatory studies and served with the Continental Army during the American Revolutionary War, attaining the rank of captain of infantry. He participated in the Battle of Stony Point in 1779, and later attested to having cut off the head of an American deserter so that it could be displayed to the troops as a deterrent. Reed was seriously wounded at the Battle of Camden in 1780. He was a member of the Maryland House of Delegates in 1787, sheriff of Kent County, Maryland from 1791 to 1794, and also member of the executive council of Maryland from 1805 to 1806.

== War of 1812, later life and death ==
Reed was elected as a Democratic-Republican to the United States Senate in 1806 to fill the vacancy caused by the resignation of Robert Wright. He was reelected the same year and served from November 25, 1806, to March 3, 1813. Although he voted, on June 17, 1812, against declaring war on Britain, Reed served as a lieutenant colonel of the Twenty-first Regiment of the Maryland Militia and later as lieutenant colonel commandant. He led a successful defense in the Battle of Caulk's Field in August 1814.

After the war, Reed was elected to the House of Representatives in the Fifteenth Congress, serving from March 4, 1817, to March 3, 1819. He was an unsuccessful candidate for reelection in 1818 to the Sixteenth Congress, but successfully contested the election of Jeremiah Cosden to the House in the Seventeenth Congress and served the remainder of the term from March 19, 1822, to March 3, 1823.

In 1828, he served as vice president of the Maryland Society of the Cincinnati. He died in Huntingtown, Maryland, and is interred in the cemetery of Christ Church near Chestertown.

== See also ==
- Titles of Nobility Amendment

== Sources ==
- Elting, John R. (1995). Amateurs, To Arms! A Military History of the War of 1812 (1st Da Capo ed.). New York: Da Capo Press. ISBN 0-306-80653-3.
- Hickey, Donald R. (2012). The War of 1812: A Forgotten Conflict. Urbana, Illinois: University of Illinois Press. ISBN 978-0-252-07837-8.
- Sharpe, Katherine (September–October 2013). "Battlefield: 1814". Archaeology Magazine. 66 (5). Archaeological Institute of America: 42–45. ISSN 0003-8113.

U.S. Senate
Preceded by Robert Wright	U.S. senator (Class 3) from Maryland; 1806–1813; Served alongside: Samuel Smith	Succeeded by Robert H. Goldsbourough
U.S. House of Representatives
Preceded by Robert Wright	Member of the U.S. House of Representatives from Maryland's 7th congressional district 1817–1819	Succeeded by Stevenson Archer
Preceded by Jeremiah Cosden	Member of the U.S. House of Representatives from Maryland's 6th congressional district 1822–1823	Succeeded by George Edward Mitchell
