= Edwin Warfield =

American politician (1848–1920)

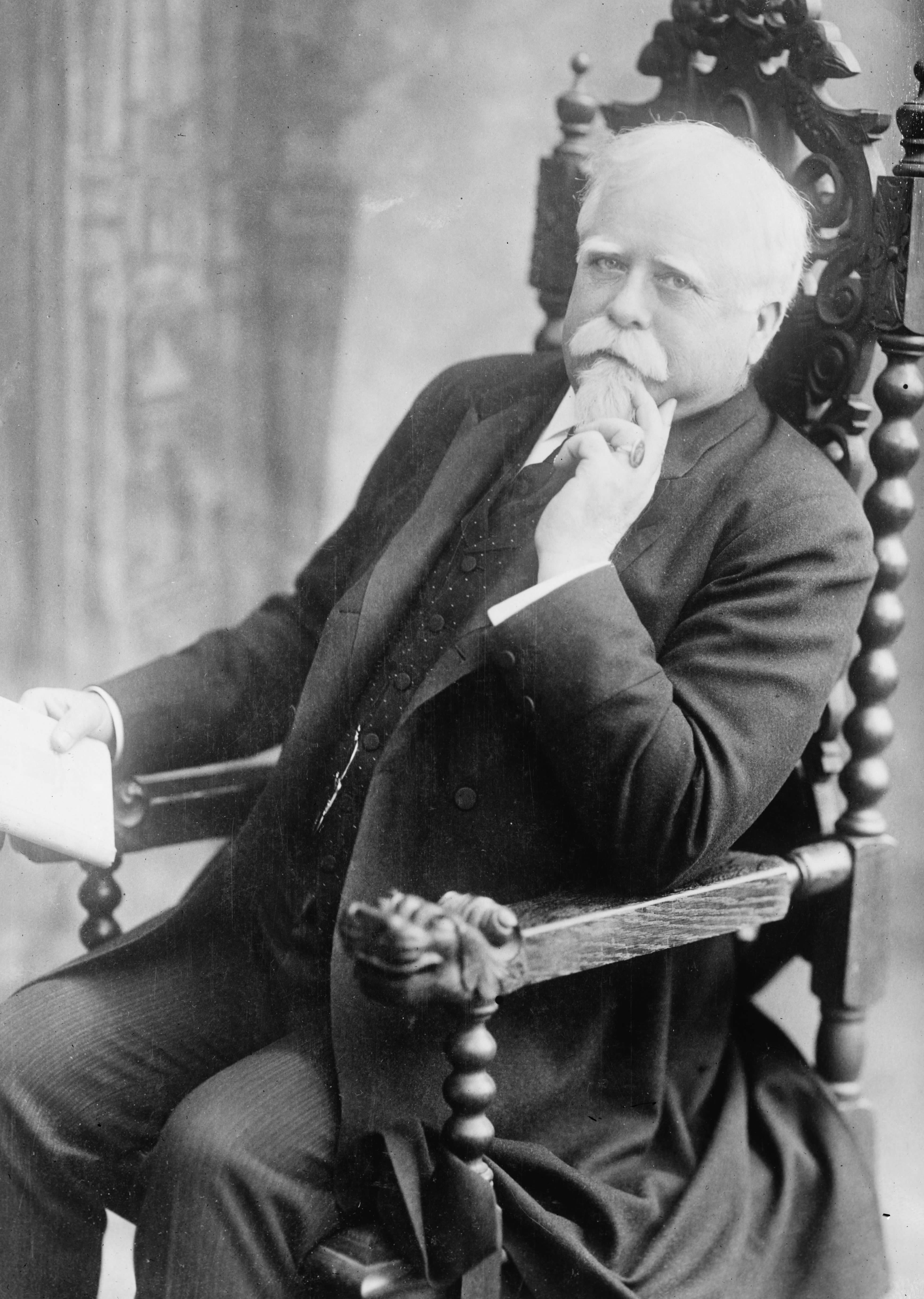

45th Governor of Maryland
- In office January 13, 1904 – January 8, 1908
- Preceded by: John Walter Smith
- Succeeded by: Austin Lane Crothers

Member of the Maryland Senate
- In office 1882–1888
- Preceded by: Arthur Pue Gorman
- Succeeded by: William B. Peter

Personal details
- Born: May 7, 1848 Howard County, Maryland, U.S.
- Died: March 31, 1920 (aged 71) Baltimore, Maryland, U.S.
- Party: Democratic
- Spouse: Emma Nicodemus
- Children: 4
- Occupation: Politician; newspaperman; banker
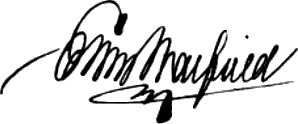
- Signature

Edwin Warfield (May 7, 1848 – March 31, 1920) was an American politician and a member of the United States Democratic Party, and the 45th governor of Maryland from 1904 to 1908. From 1902 to 1903, he served as president general of the National Society of the Sons of the American Revolution.

== Early life ==
Edwin Warfield was born to Albert G. Warfield and Margaret Gassaway Warfield at the "Oakdale" plantation in Howard County, Maryland. He received early education at the public schools of Howard County and at St. Timothy's Hall (formerly an Episcopal Church institution, now known as St. Timothy's School) in Catonsville, Maryland, southwest of Baltimore. In 1877, he became a professor at Maryland's Agricultural College.

Although Maryland was a Union State, many families were southern sympathizers, and two of Warfield's brothers served in the Confederate States Army. Gassaway Watkins Warfield died at Camp Chase, while Albert G Warfield Jr. survived the conflict. The emancipation of enslaved workers left his family with little property besides their land, and so Warfield interrupted his education to work on the family farm. He also spent time as a teacher in the county schools, and studied for admission to the bar in his spare time. In 1888, Warfield founded The Daily Record as a newspaper covering finance, commerce, business, and court matters or legal proceedings. The publication continued into the 21st century, along with a corresponding "Warfield's" magazine published from the 1980s through the 1990s.

Through his father's line, he was a third cousin to the Duchess of Windsor (originally named Bessie Wallis Warfield, later Wallis Warfield Simpson of Baltimore), wife of the abdicated king of the United Kingdom, King Edward VIII, later Prince Edward, Duke of Windsor. Warfield's lineage also allowed him membership into the Sons of the American Revolution, where he served as President General from 1902 until 1903.

== Political career ==
In 1874, Warfield was appointed to fill a vacancy in the office of Register of Wills for Howard County. He was elected to a full six-year term the following year, and served until 1881. He was appointed to the Maryland Senate following the resignation of Arthur Pue Gorman to accept a higher office, was re-elected in 1883, and served as President of the Maryland State Senate during the 1886 session. While in the Senate, Warfield began his own law practice in Ellicott City, Maryland, and purchased the Ellicott City Times, where he served as editor from 1882 to 1886.

During the 1884 Presidential election, Warfield made significant contributions to the campaign of Grover Cleveland in Maryland. Cleveland would become the first Democratic president to be elected since before the Civil War. Following the election, Cleveland appointed Warfield to serve as Surveyor of the Port of Baltimore beginning April 5, 1885. Warfield served in that position until May 1, 1890, after the Republicans returned to power. In 1890, Warfield married Emma Nicodemus, with whom he had three daughters and one son.

In 1890, after his removal from the position of Surveyor, Warfield founded the Fidelity and Deposit Company, where he served as president until his death. He was chosen as a delegate to the 1896 Democratic National Convention, but otherwise remained out of politics for nearly a decade.

In September 1903, Warfield served as an orator for the ceremonies dedicating the William H. Watson Monument.

== Governor of Maryland ==
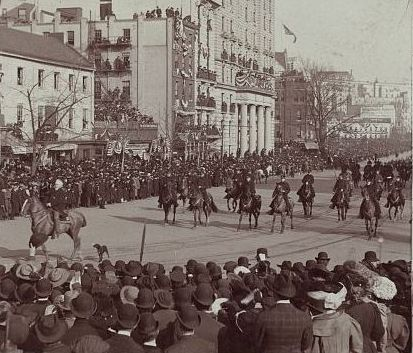
Gov. Warfield leading the 3rd Brigade of the Maryland National Guard in the inaugural parade of 26th President Theodore Roosevelt on Pennsylvania Avenue in Washington, D.C., photographed by William H. Rau on March 4, 1905

Warfield chose to run for Governor of Maryland in 1899, but lost the Democratic nomination after he was opposed by influential Maryland politicians, including Arthur Pue Gorman, a powerful U.S. Senator who was allied to the interests of "old pols" in Baltimore City. Though it was apparent that the party bosses did not hold him in favor, he again sought the nomination in 1903, openly discouraging African Americans' ability to vote. He was successfully nominated by the party, and defeated his Republican opponent, Stevenson A. Williams, by over 12,600 votes. He was inaugurated as the 45th Governor of Maryland on January 13, 1904.

The most significant event of his tenure as Governor came when Arthur Pue Gorman, who had opposed Warfield's election, proposed the "Poe Amendment" to the Maryland State Constitution of 1867, which would have disenfranchised most black voters in the state. The bill easily passed the Democrat-controlled General Assembly, but Warfield refused to support the proposed amendment and delayed placing it before the voters. While Warfield was in favor of some of the amendment's provisions (such as denying the vote to the less-educated black voters of the state) he feared it would eventually lead to greater levels of disenfranchisement which could threaten all voters in the state. The proposed amendment was put before voters in a 1904 referendum and was defeated by 30,000 votes, a defeat to the crypto-segregationists in the party in which Warfield played a major role. Warfield's actions in this affair further alienated him from the Democratic machine in Maryland, which was openly hostile towards him by the time he left office.

As Governor, Warfield supported the establishment of direct voting by popular election for U.S. Senators, in contrast to that time's processes of election via each state's legislative body. He argued this before the General Assembly in 1906, and direct election of senators was eventually codified into national law with the Seventeenth Amendment to the United States Constitution. In his time as Governor, Warfield also authorized and approved of an official state Flag of Maryland, representing a reunited State of Maryland following the division of the Civil War. This was further supported by the Maryland National Guard flying the reinvigoratedMaryland flag.

Warfield helped arrange for the return of the body of American Revolutionary War Captain John Paul Jones from its original burial site in Paris to its reinterment at the U. S. Naval Academy in Annapolis, Maryland. Warfield left office in January 1908.

== Later life and legacy ==
After his tenure as governor, Warfield returned to his previous activities. He became president of the Fidelity Trust Company with Baltimore Sun Publisher Van Lear Black. He served on the board of the Montgomery Mutual Insurance Company until his death. In addition to retaining his presidency at the Fidelity and Deposit Company, he was a prominent member of the Maryland Club and served as president of the Maryland Historical Society (1913–1920). Warfield was proud of his family's Confederate legacy, representing Maryland in reunions and events like the 1911 Southern Commercial Congress in Atlanta.

Warfield's health began to deteriorate in late 1919, and he was confined to his home in Baltimore during the last few months of his life. He died there, and was interred in his family burial ground at "Cherry Grove" in Howard County.

Warfield was eulogized by The Baltimore Sun not as a man of definitive accomplishments, but one who stood up to the Democratic machine, supported the public interest, and transformed the office of the governor into a modern institution responsible to the public, rather than the political party.

In Columbia, Maryland, Governor Warfield is remembered with a street named for him, Governor Warfield Parkway. In 1914, a dredge named the Gov. Warfield helped to dig the Cape Cod Canal in Massachusetts.

Party political offices
Preceded by John Walter Smith	Democratic nominee for Governor of Maryland; 1903	Succeeded by Austin Lane Crothers
Political offices
Preceded by Henry Lloyd	President of the Maryland State Senate; 1886	Succeeded by George Peter
Preceded by John Walter Smith	Governor of Maryland; 1904–1908	Succeeded by Austin Lane Crothers
