= Best Endeavor =

Historic house in Maryland

- U.S. National Register of Historic Places
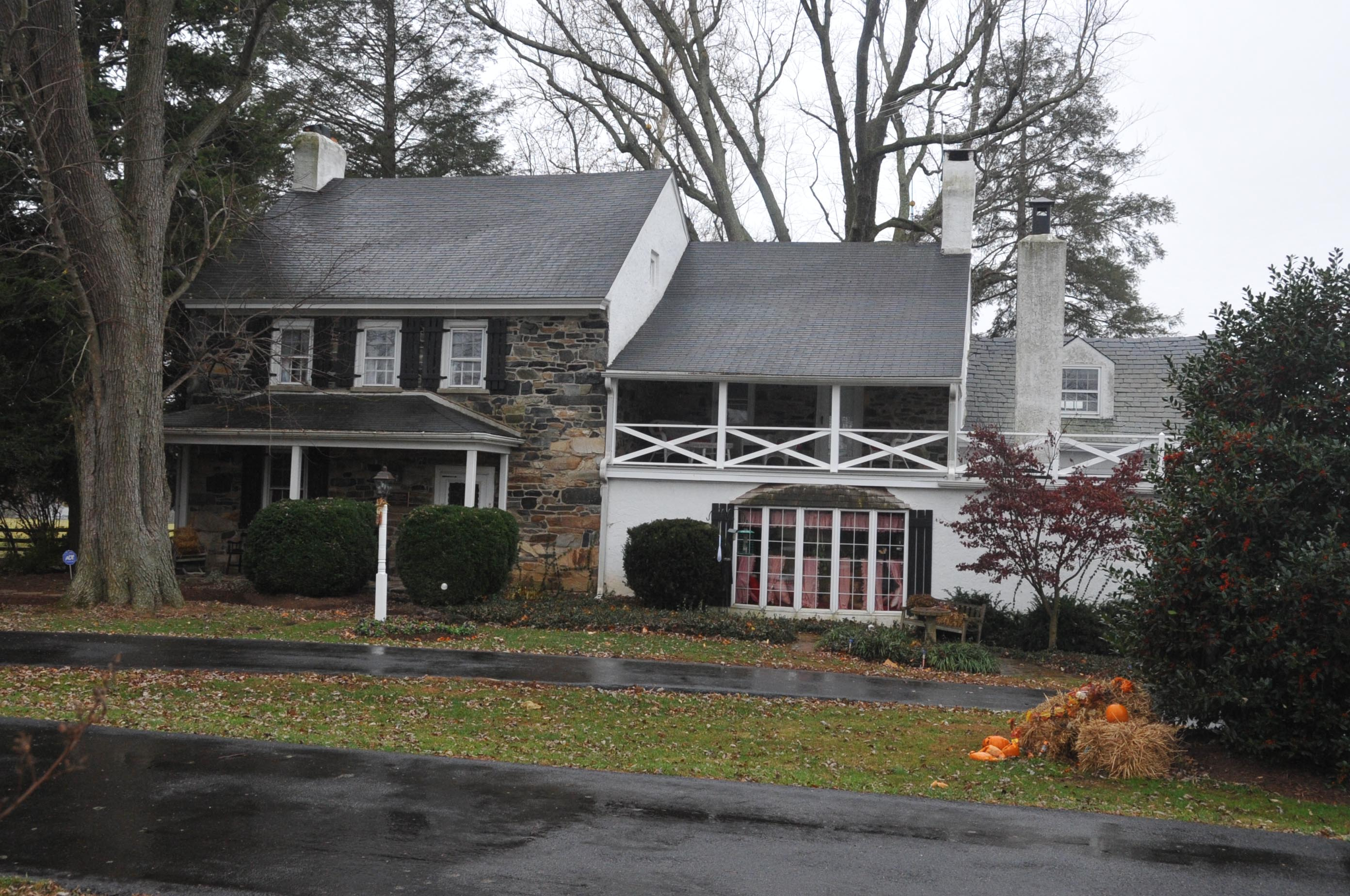
- Best Endeavor in 2007

- Location within Maryland Location within the United States
- Location: 1612 Calvary Road (MD 136), Churchville, Maryland
- Coordinates: 39°30′12″N 76°15′55″W
- Area: 2.8 acres (1.1 ha)
- Built: 1740
- Architectural style: Greek Revival, Federal
- NRHP reference No.: 90001993
- Added to NRHP: December 28, 1990

Best Endeavor, also known as Buena Vista Farm, is a historic home and farm complex located at Churchville, Harford County, Maryland. It is a large, multi-sectioned, mid to late 18th century, partially stuccoed stone telescope house. It has two primary sections: the western unit, constructed about 1740, is four bays wide and about 1785, a 2 1/2-story, three-bay, side-passage / double parlor block was added against the east gable. Also on the property and dating from the mid-19th century or earlier are a stone smokehouse, a timber-framed barn with board and batten siding, a timber-framed shed, and the ruin of a large stone and frame bank barn.

It was listed on the National Register of Historic Places in 1990.
