= Church of the Holy Trinity (Churchville, Maryland) =

Historic church in Maryland, United States

- U.S. National Register of Historic Places
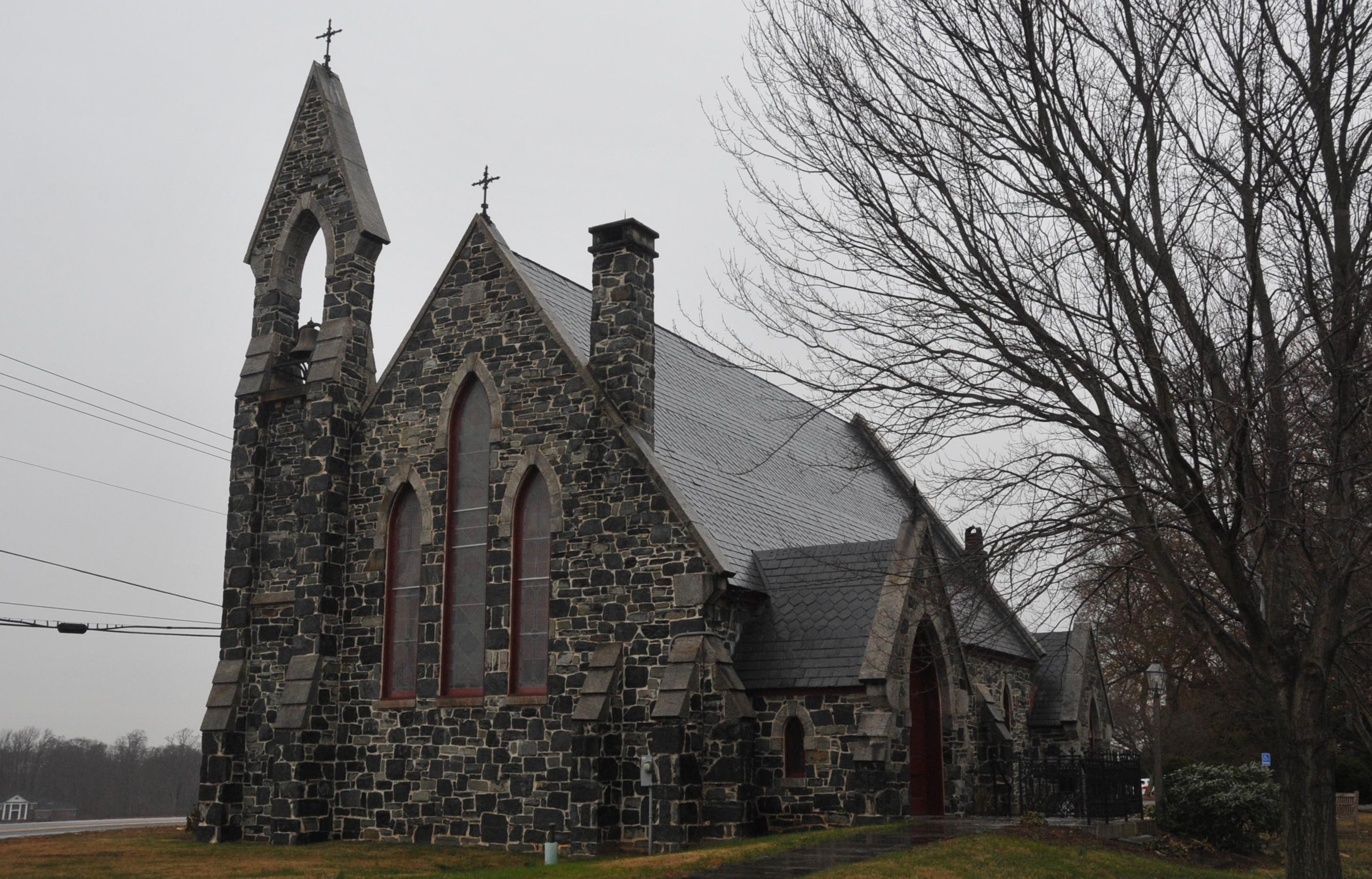
- Church of the Holy Trinity in 2007

- Location within Maryland Location within the United States
- Location: 2929 Level Rd., Churchville, Maryland
- Coordinates: 39°33′39″N 76°14′48″W
- Area: 2.2 acres (0.89 ha)
- Built: 1878
- Architect: Archer, George
- Architectural style: Gothic
- NRHP reference No.: 02001580
- Added to NRHP: December 27, 2002

Church of the Holy Trinity, or Holy Trinity Episcopal Church, is a historic Episcopal church located at Churchville, Harford County, Maryland. It is a stone structure built in 1878 in the Gothic Revival style. Its front facade features a triple window of stained glass, consisting of three Gothic-arched lancet windows. It also features a steep roof, an architectural chancel at the east end, south porch and sacristy, belfry at the west end, and lancet windows and doors with pointed arches.

It was listed on the National Register of Historic Places in 2002.
