= Webster's Forest =

Historic house in Maryland, United States

- U.S. National Register of Historic Places
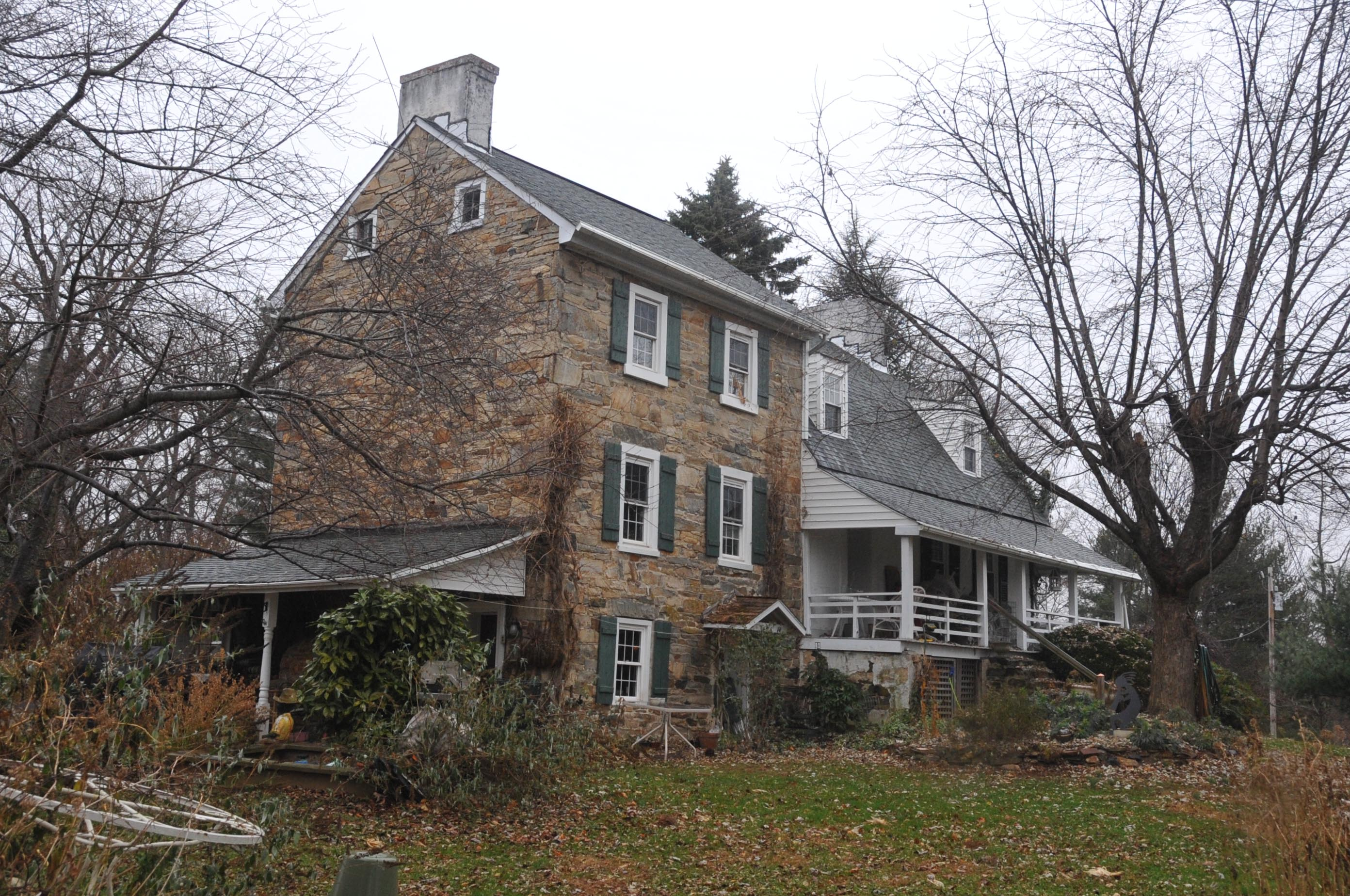
- Webster's Forest in 2007

- Location within Maryland Location within the United States
- Location: 500 Asbury Road, Churchville, Maryland
- Coordinates: 39°32′32″N 76°15′51″W
- Area: 2.3 acres (0.93 ha)
- Built: 1835
- NRHP reference No.: 83002951
- Added to NRHP: September 1, 1983

Webster's Forest is a historic home located at Churchville, Harford County, Maryland, United States. It is a stone house constructed in two sections. The pre-1800 eastern section stands three bays wide, one and a half stories tall above a high basement, with a gambrel roof. Despite severe damage by fire in 1966, exterior walls, chimney, floor structures, most of the flooring, and portions of the cornice of this section remains original. The two-bay, gable-roofed west addition appears to date from the second quarter of the 19th century.

Webster's Forest was listed on the National Register of Historic Places in 1983.
