= United States House Committee on Expenditures in the Navy Department =

The United States House Committee on Expenditures in the Navy Department is a defunct committee of the U.S. House of Representatives.

== History ==
Article I, section 9 of the United States Constitution provides that

No money shall be drawn from the Treasury, but in Consequence of Appropriations made by Law; and a regular Statement and Account of the Receipts and Expenditures of all public Money shall be published from time to time.

Initially, the House appointed special committees to monitor the use of public money. In 1802, the Committee of Ways and Means was empowered to review expenditures and to report such provisions and arrangements "as may be necessary to add to the economy of the departments, and the accountability of their officers." On February 26, 1814, Congress divided the duties of the Committee of Ways and Means and transferred that part relating to the examination of past expenditures to a standing Committee on Public Expenditures.

It shall be the duty of the said Committee for Public Expenditures, to examine into the state of the several Public Departments, and particularly into the laws making appropriations of moneys, and to report whether the moneys have been disbursed conformably with such laws; and also to report, from time to time, such provisions and arrangements as may be necessary to add to the economy of the Departments and the accountability of their officers.

In 1816, the House initiated an organizational change that provided a means of continuously and consistently following the operations of the various Departments in the Executive branch and scrutinizing their expenditures. On February 28, 1816, Henry St. George Tucker of Virginia proposed the appointment of six standing committees to examine the accounts and expenditures of the State, Treasury, War, Navy, Post Office Departments and those related to the construction and maintenance of public buildings.

The committees were created on March 30, 1816, with Stevenson Archer (Maryland), Wilson Lumpkin (Georgia), and Benjamin Huger (South Carolina) as the first members of the Committee on Expenditures in the Navy Department.

In 1927 it was consolidated with ten other Committees on Expenditures to form the United States House Committee on Expenditures in the Executive Departments. The functions of the committee are now part of the United States House Committee on Oversight and Government Reform.
