= Thomas Culbreth =

American politician

Thomas Culbreth (April 13, 1786 – April 16, 1843) was an American politician.

Born in Kent County, Delaware, eight miles northeast of Greensboro, Maryland, Cubreth attended public schools and studied under private tutors. He moved to Denton, Maryland, in 1806 and was a clerk in a store there. He became a member of the local party committee at Hillsboro in 1810, and was elected as a member of the Maryland House of Delegates in 1812 and 1813. He was also cashier of the State Bank at Denton in 1813.

Culbreth was elected from the sixth district of Maryland as a Democratic-Republican to the Fifteenth Congress and reelected to the Sixteenth Congress, serving in the United States House of Representatives from March 4, 1817, to March 3, 1821. After two terms in office, he declined to run for re-election. He was appointed chief judge of the Caroline County orphans’ court in 1822 and was clerk of the executive council of Maryland from 1825 to 1838. He resided in Annapolis, Maryland before returning to Denton in 1838 to work in mercantile pursuits. Soon afterward, he moved to Orrell Farm, near Greensboro, where he died on April 16, 1843. He is interred in the family cemetery on the farm.

U.S. House of Representatives
Preceded by Stevenson Archer	Representative of the 6th Congressional District of Maryland; 1817–1821	Succeeded by Jeremiah Cosden
