= Churchville Presbyterian Church =

Historic church in Maryland, US

- U.S. National Register of Historic Places
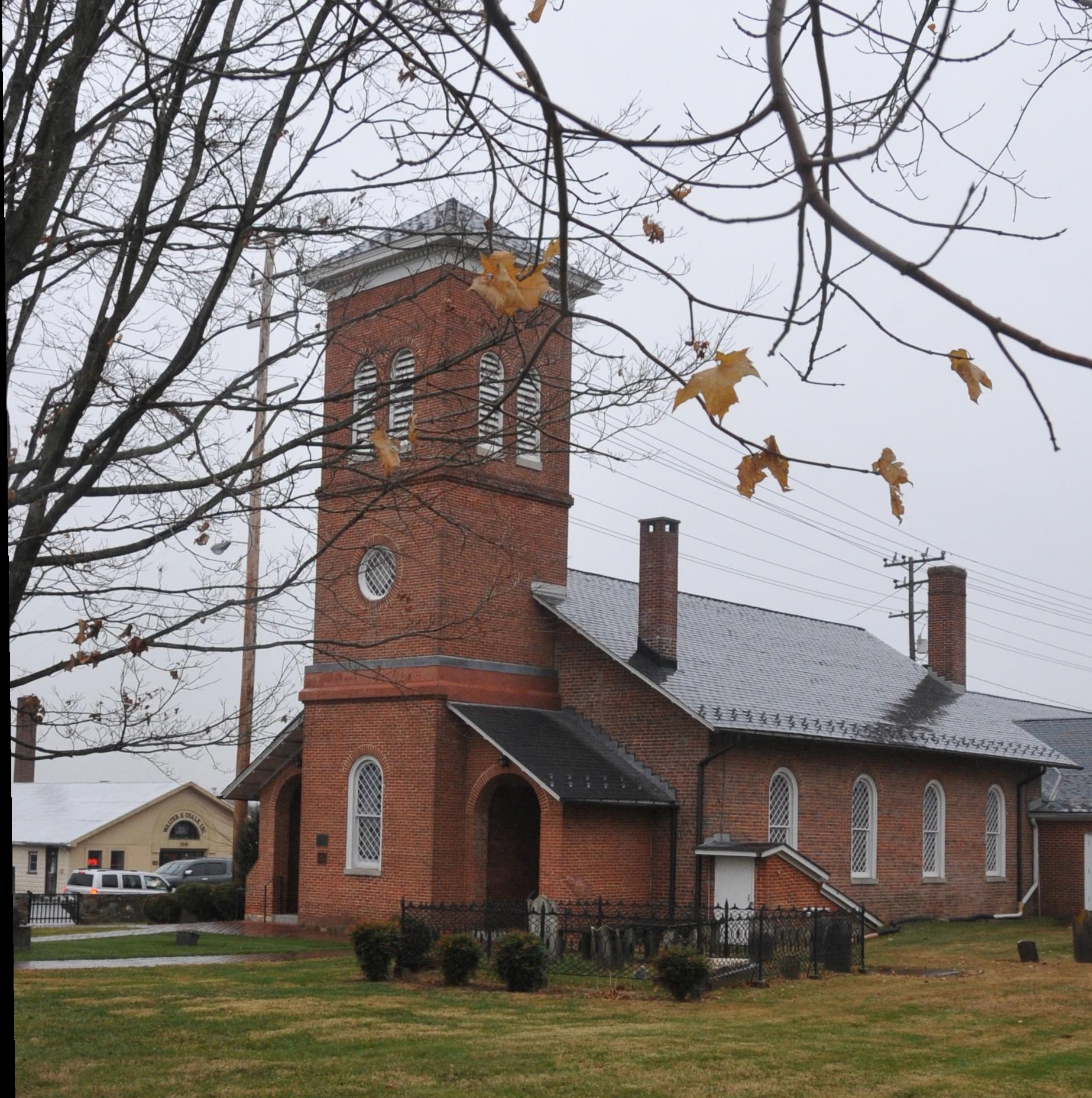
- Churchville Presbyterian Church in 2007

- Location within Maryland Location within the United States
- Location: Intersection of MD 22 and MD 136, Churchville, Maryland
- Coordinates: 39°33′34″N 76°15′10″W
- Area: 4.5 acres (1.8 ha)
- Built: 1820
- Architect: Walton, Elijah; Niernsee & Neilson
- Architectural style: Italianate
- NRHP reference No.: 86001733
- Added to NRHP: August 21, 1986

Churchville Presbyterian Church is a historic Presbyterian church located at Churchville, Harford County, Maryland. It consists of three harmoniously designed sections: the original one-story, four by three bay, gable-roofed brick building dated to 1820; the three-story, restrained Italianate, brick bell tower added in 1870; and the low, one-story brick church hall and office added in 1950. Located adjacent is a sequestered 4.5-acre (1.8 ha) graveyard with stones dating back to 1819. The community of Churchville, which surrounds the church, grew up around and took its name from the structure.

The 1870 addition of an Italianate, brick belltower was designed by architect J. Crawford Nielson of the firm Niernsee and Neilson.

It was listed on the National Register of Historic Places in 1986.

== Notable burials ==
- George Archer (1848–1920), architect
- John Archer (1741–1810), U.S. Representative, Maryland delegate, physician
- R. Harris Archer (died 1922), Maryland delegate
- Stevenson Archer (1786–1848), U.S. Representative and Maryland delegate
- Stevenson Archer (1827–1898), U.S. Representative and Treasurer of Maryland
- J. Wilmer Cronin (1896–1982), state politician and lawyer from Maryland
- John Miller Turpin Finney (1863–1942), academic and surgeon
- Benedict H. Hanson (died 1882), state delegate
- Stevenson A. Williams (1851–1932), Maryland state senator
