= 1903 Maryland gubernatorial election =

- November 3, 1903
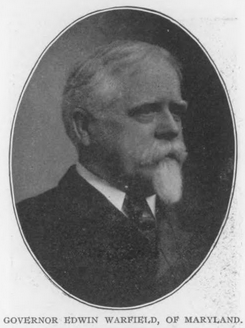

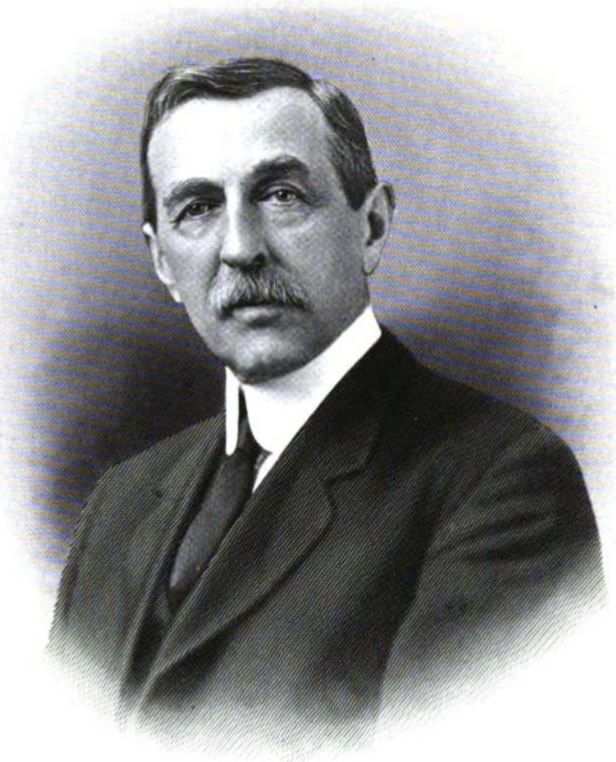
Nominee	Edwin Warfield	Stevenson A. Williams
Party	Democratic	Republican
Popular vote	108,548	95,923
Percentage	52.01%	45.97%
- County results Warfield: 40–50% 50–60% 60–70% Williams: 40–50% 50–60% 60–70%
Governor before election
John Walter Smith
Democratic
Elected Governor
Edwin Warfield
Democratic

The 1903 Maryland gubernatorial election took place on November 3, 1903.

Incumbent Governor John Walter Smith did not seek re-election.

Democratic candidate Edwin Warfield defeated Republican candidate Stevenson A. Williams.

== General election ==
=== Candidates ===
- Edwin Warfield, Democratic, businessman and former surveyor of the Port of Baltimore
- Stevenson A. Williams, Republican, former State Senator
- Silas M. Crabill, Socialist
- William Gisriel, Prohibition, businessman, Prohibition candidate for Maryland's 4th congressional district in 1900

=== Results ===
1903 Maryland gubernatorial election
Party	Candidate	Votes	%	±%
Democratic	Edwin Warfield	108,548	52.01%	
Republican	Stevenson A. Williams	95,923	45.97%	
Prohibition	William Gisriel	2,913	1.40%	
Socialist	Silas M. Crabill	1,302	0.62%	
Majority		12,625	6.04%	
Turnout		208,686	100.00%	
Democratic hold		Swing		
