= Jeremiah Cosden =

American politician

Jeremiah Cosden (1768 – December 5, 1824) was an American politician. He was elected as a Democratic-Republican and presented credentials as a Member-elect to the Seventeenth Congress and served from March 4, 1821, to March 19, 1822, when he was succeeded by Philip Reed, who successfully contested his election. He died in Baltimore, Maryland.

The race for Maryland's 6th District House Seat between Cosden (sometimes spelled "Causden") and Reed was originally declared a tie. The Governor and Council of Maryland - in what they thought was accordance of the law - decided to seat Cosden after drawing lots. Reed, who like Cosden was a Democratic-Republican, contested the election. The House decided that the Governor and Council were not allowed to choose a winner; that two votes for Reed that were excluded ought to count and that one that was counted for him was illegal. As a result Cosden, who had been seated for 15 days, was removed and Reed was seated for the remainder of the term. This is the closest U.S. House race in Maryland history.

U.S. House of Representatives
Preceded by Thomas Culbreth	Representative of the 6th Congressional District of Maryland; 1821–1822	Succeeded by Philip Reed
