= Stevenson Archer (politician, born 1827) =

American politician (1827–1898)

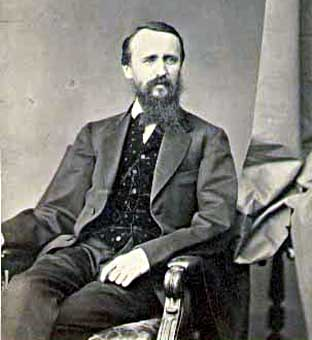

Treasurer of Maryland
- In office 1886–1890
- Governor: Henry Lloyd; Elihu Emory Jackson
- Preceded by: John Sterett Gittings
- Succeeded by: Edwin Brown

Member of the U.S. House of Representatives from Maryland's 2nd district
- In office March 4, 1867 – March 3, 1875
- Preceded by: John Lewis Thomas Jr.
- Succeeded by: Charles Boyle Roberts
- Constituency: 2nd district
- In office 1854–1854 Serving with William M. Elliott and George Stephenson

Personal details
- Born: February 28, 1827 Harford County, Maryland, U.S.
- Died: August 2, 1898 (aged 71) Baltimore, Maryland, U.S.
- Resting place: Churchville Presbyterian Church; Churchville, Maryland, U.S.
- Party: Whig; Democratic
- Spouse: Blanche Franklin (m. 1855)
- Children: 5
- Parent: Stevenson Archer (father)
- Relatives: John Archer (grandfather); George Earle Chamberlain (nephew)
- Education: Princeton College
- Occupation: politician; lawyer; jurist

Stevenson Archer (February 28, 1827 – August 2, 1898) was an American politician. A congressman from Maryland, he served in the second district for four terms from 1867 to 1875. He served in the Maryland House of Delegates and as Treasurer of Maryland. He was a slave owner.

== Early life ==
Stevenson Archer was born at Medical Hall, Harford County, Maryland, near Churchville, on February 28, 1827, to Pamelia B. (née Hays) and Stevenson Archer. Archer's father and grandfather, John Archer, were both Congressmen from Maryland. His sister, Pamelia H. Archer, was the mother of George Earle Chamberlain, the 11th governor of Oregon and a two term United States Senator.

Archer attended Bel Air Academy, later graduating from Princeton College in 1848. He studied law at the office of Otho Scott in Bel Air, and was admitted to the bar in 1850, commencing practice the same year.

== Career ==
In 1851, Archer formed a partnership with Edwin Hanson Webster. In 1853, he was elected as a Whig to the Maryland House of Delegates.

In 1866, he was elected as a Democrat to the Fortieth and to the three succeeding Congresses, serving from March 4, 1867, until March 3, 1875. He was an unsuccessful candidate for renomination in 1874. In 1867, Archer was appointed as judge for a term on the Cecil County court.

Archer succeeded John Sterett Gittings as Treasurer of Maryland in 1886. In 1890, he was accused of embezzling $132,000 in state funds. The investigation found he had kept railroad bonds for personal use. He pleaded guilty to malfeasance and was sentenced to five years in the Maryland Penitentiary. In May 1894, Governor Frank Brown pardoned him. Archer continued the practice of law in Bel Air until his death.

== Personal life ==
Archer married Blanche Franklin of Sumner County, Tennessee in 1855. She was also known as Jane Cage Franklin. Together, they had five children.

Archer's family lived at Hazell Dell near Bel Air.

== Later life and death ==
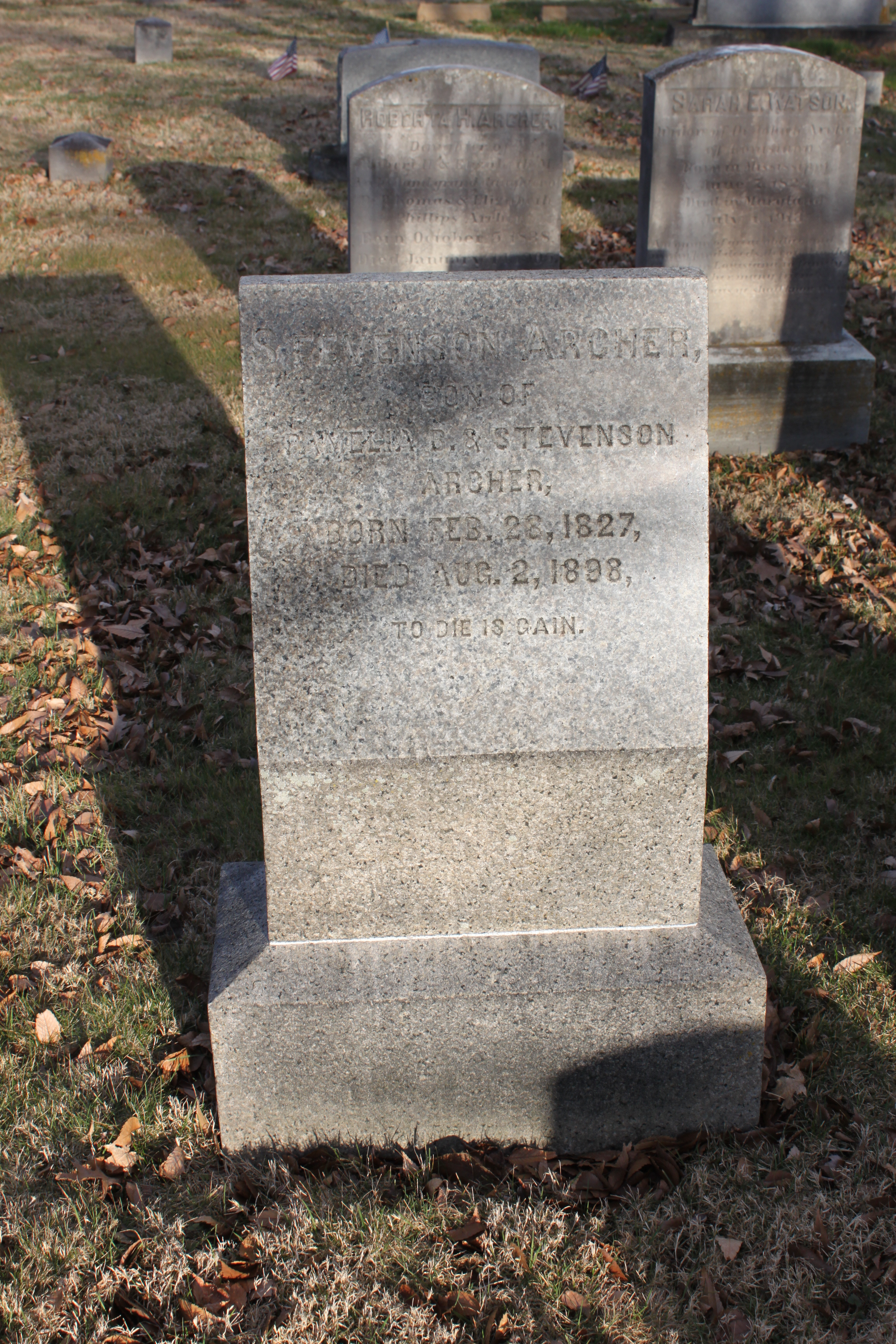
Grave of Archer in Churchville Presbyterian Church cemetery

Archer suffered from kidney ailments since 1893. After leaving prison in May 1894, he was hospitalized. Archer died from Bright's disease on August 2, 1898, at the City Hospital in Baltimore. He is interred in the Churchville Presbyterian Church cemetery.

== Footnotes ==
U.S. House of Representatives
Preceded by John Lewis Thomas Jr.	U.S. Congressman from the 2nd district of Maryland; 1867–1875	Succeeded by Charles B. Roberts
Political offices
Preceded by John Sterett Gittings	Treasurer of Maryland; 1886–1890	Succeeded by Edwin Brown
