= Stevenson Archer (politician, born 1786) =

Judge and United States Representative from Maryland

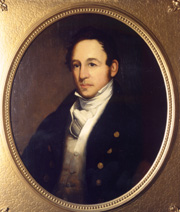

Chief Judge of the Maryland Court of Appeals
- In office 1844–1848
- Preceded by: John Buchanan
- Succeeded by: Thomas Beale Dorsey

Member of the U.S. House of Representatives from Maryland's 6th district
- In office March 4, 1819 – March 3, 1821
- Preceded by: Philip Reed
- Succeeded by: Jeremiah Cosden
- In office October 26, 1811 – March 3, 1817
- Preceded by: John Montgomery
- Succeeded by: Philip Reed

Member of the Maryland House of Delegates
- In office 1809–1810

Personal details
- Born: October 11, 1786 near Churchville, Maryland, U.S.
- Died: June 26, 1848 (aged 61) Churchville, Maryland, U.S.
- Resting place: Churchville Presbyterian Church; Churchville, Maryland, U.S.
- Party: Democratic-Republican
- Spouse: Pamela Barney Hays (m. 1811)
- Children: 9, including Stevenson Archer
- Parent: John Archer (father)
- Relatives: Stevenson A. Williams (grandson)
- Education: Princeton College
- Occupation: Politician

Stevenson Archer (October 11, 1786 – June 26, 1848) was a judge and United States Representative from Maryland, representing the sixth district from 1811 to 1817 and from 1819 to 1821. His son Stevenson Archer and father John Archer were also U.S. Congressmen from Maryland.

== Early life ==
Archer was born at Medical Hall, near Churchville, Harford County, Maryland, on October 11, 1786, to Catherine (née Harris) and John Archer. He attended Nottingham Academy of Maryland, later graduating from Princeton College in 1805. He studied law, was admitted to the bar of Harford County, Maryland, in 1808, and commenced practice the same year.

== Career ==
From 1809 to 1810, Archer served as a member of the Maryland House of Delegates, and was later elected as a Democrat-Republican to the Twelfth United States Congress to fill the vacancy caused by the resignation of John Montgomery. He was reelected to the Thirteenth and Fourteenth Congresses and served from October 26, 1811, until March 3, 1817. Having reached the Constitutional age of service in the House (25 years of age) less than one month prior to taking his seat, Archer was the youngest member of the Twelfth Congress, which was defined at least in part by the injection of youth into the government. Archer was one of the firmest supporters of the War Hawk agenda in Congress, consistently voting for military preparation and the War of 1812.

In Congress, Archer served as chairman of the Committee on Claims (Thirteenth Congress), and as a member of the Committee on Expenditures in the Department of the Navy (Fourteenth Congress). During the War of 1812, he was paymaster to the Fortieth Maryland Militia, and was appointed on March 5, 1817, by President James Madison as United States judge for the Territory of Mississippi, with powers of Governor, holding court at St. Stephens.

Archer resigned within a year, and returned to Maryland to continue his law practice. He was elected to the Sixteenth Congress, serving from March 4, 1819, until March 3, 1821, and, in Congress, served as chairman of the Committee on Expenditures in the Department of the Navy. In 1823, Archer was appointed chief judge of the judicial circuit court of Baltimore and Harford Counties and Baltimore City. In 1844, Archer was appointed by Governor Thomas Pratt as chief justice of the Maryland Court of Appeals and served until his death.

== Personal life ==
Archer married Pamela Barney Hays in 1811. They had nine children, including Stevenson Archer. His grandson was Stevenson A. Williams. On October 6, 1809, Archer was the first man to be made a Master Mason in Mount Ararat Lodge No. 44, in Bel Air Maryland, one of the states oldest and most respected Masonic Lodges. He served as Worshipful Master of the Lodge sometime between 1816 and 1820; the exact year is unknown due to the loss of Lodge records for those years.

Archer was a slave owner.

== Death ==
Archer died on June 26, 1848, at Medical Hall. He is interred in the Churchville Presbyterian Church cemetery.

== See also ==
- List of Mississippi Territory judges

U.S. House of Representatives
Preceded by John Montgomery	U.S. Congressman from the 6th district of Maryland; 1811–1817	Succeeded by Thomas Culbreth
Preceded by Philip Reed	U.S. Congressman from the 7th district of Maryland; 1819–1821	Succeeded by Robert Wright
Legal offices
Preceded by John Buchanan	Chief Judge of the Maryland Court of Appeals; 1844–1848	Succeeded by Thomas Beale Dorsey
