= John Archer (American politician) =

American politician and physician (1741–1810)

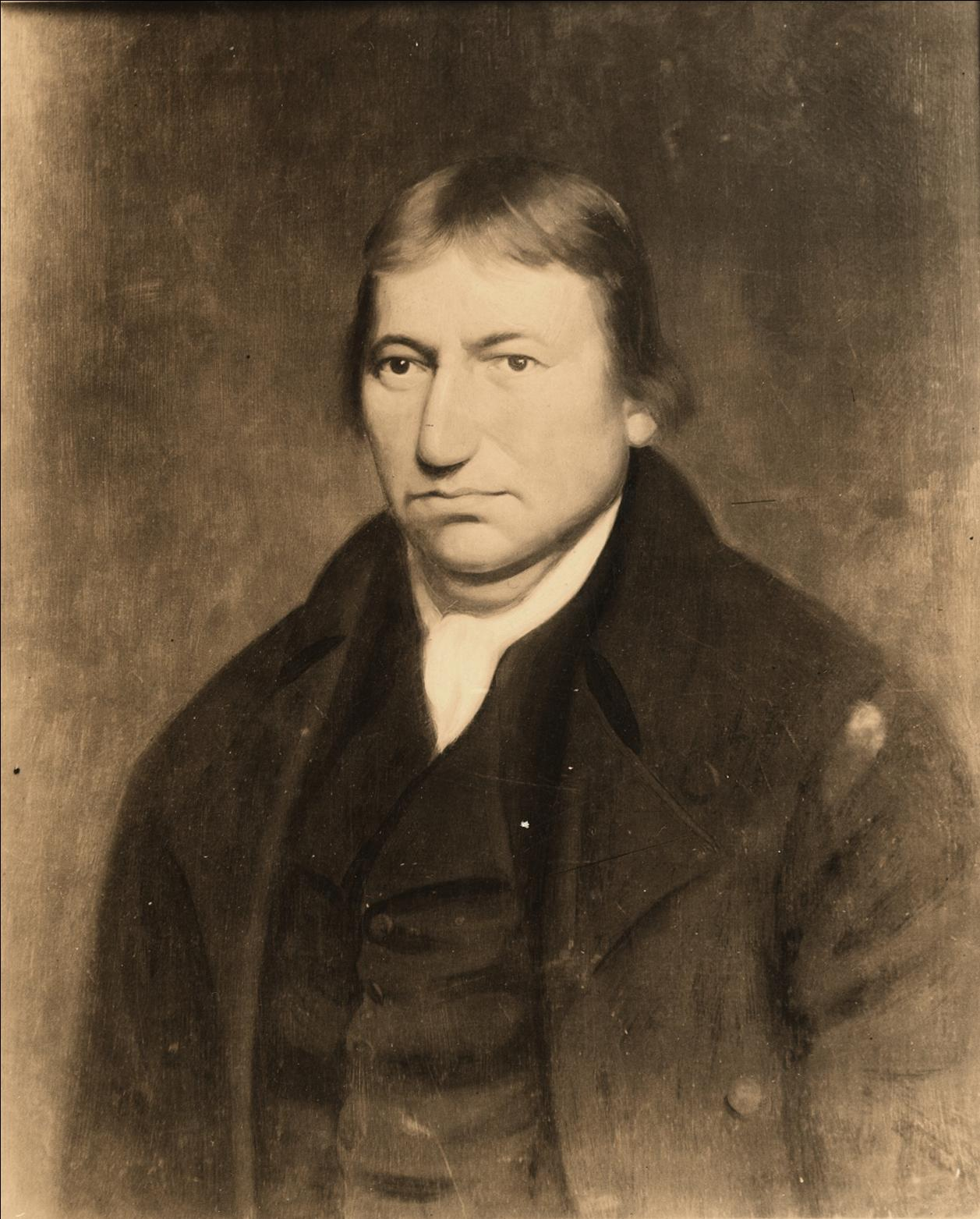

Member of the U.S. House of Representatives from Maryland's 6th district
- In office March 4, 1801 – March 3, 1807
- Preceded by: Gabriel Christie
- Succeeded by: John Montgomery

Personal details
- Born: May 5, 1741 near Churchville, Province of Maryland, British America
- Died: September 28, 1810 (aged 69) near Churchville, Maryland, U.S.
- Resting place: Churchville Presbyterian Church; Churchville, Maryland, U.S.
- Spouse: Catherine Harris (m. 1766)
- Children: Stevenson Archer; Thomas Archer
- Relatives: Stevenson Archer II (grandson); Stevenson A. Williams (great-grandson)
- Education: West Nottingham Academy
- Alma mater: Princeton College (AB, AM); College of Philadelphia
- Occupation: Physician; politician

John Archer (May 5, 1741 – September 28, 1810) was a physician, planter and politician. He was a U.S. Congressman from Maryland, representing the sixth district for three terms from 1801 to 1807. His son, Stevenson Archer and grandson Stevenson Archer II were also Congressmen from Maryland.

== Early life ==
Archer was born on May 5, 1741, near Churchville in the Province of Maryland, and attended the West Nottingham Academy in Cecil County, later graduating from Princeton College in 1760 with a Bachelor of Arts and in 1763 with a Master of Arts. He studied theology, but owing to a throat affliction, he abandoned his studies in that area and began the study of medicine. He graduated as a physician from the College of Philadelphia on June 21, 1768, receiving the first medical diploma issued on the American continent.

== Career ==
In July 1769, Archer commenced the practice of law in Harford County. He was a member of the Revolutionary committee from 1774 to 1776, and later raised a military company during the American Revolutionary War. He was a member of the first state constitutional convention of 1776, and served in the Maryland House of Delegates from 1777 to 1779. During the Revolutionary War, Archer was volunteer aide-de-camp to General Anthony Wayne at Stony Point. On June 1, 1779, Archer was made a captain and subsequently a major in the Continental Army.

Archer was elected as a Democratic-Republican to the Seventh, Eighth, and Ninth Congresses, serving from March 4, 1801, until March 3, 1807. He founded, with his son Thomas Archer, the medical and chirurgical faculty of Maryland in 1799. In 1810, Archer documented two cases of superfecundation, more specifically called "heteropaternal superfecundation." In the first case, a Caucasian woman gave birth to mixed twins — one Caucasian, one Afro-Caucasian - after having had intercourse with two men of differing race within a few weeks.

== Personal life ==
Archer married Catherine Harris on October 18, 1766. His son was Stevenson Archer, chief justice.

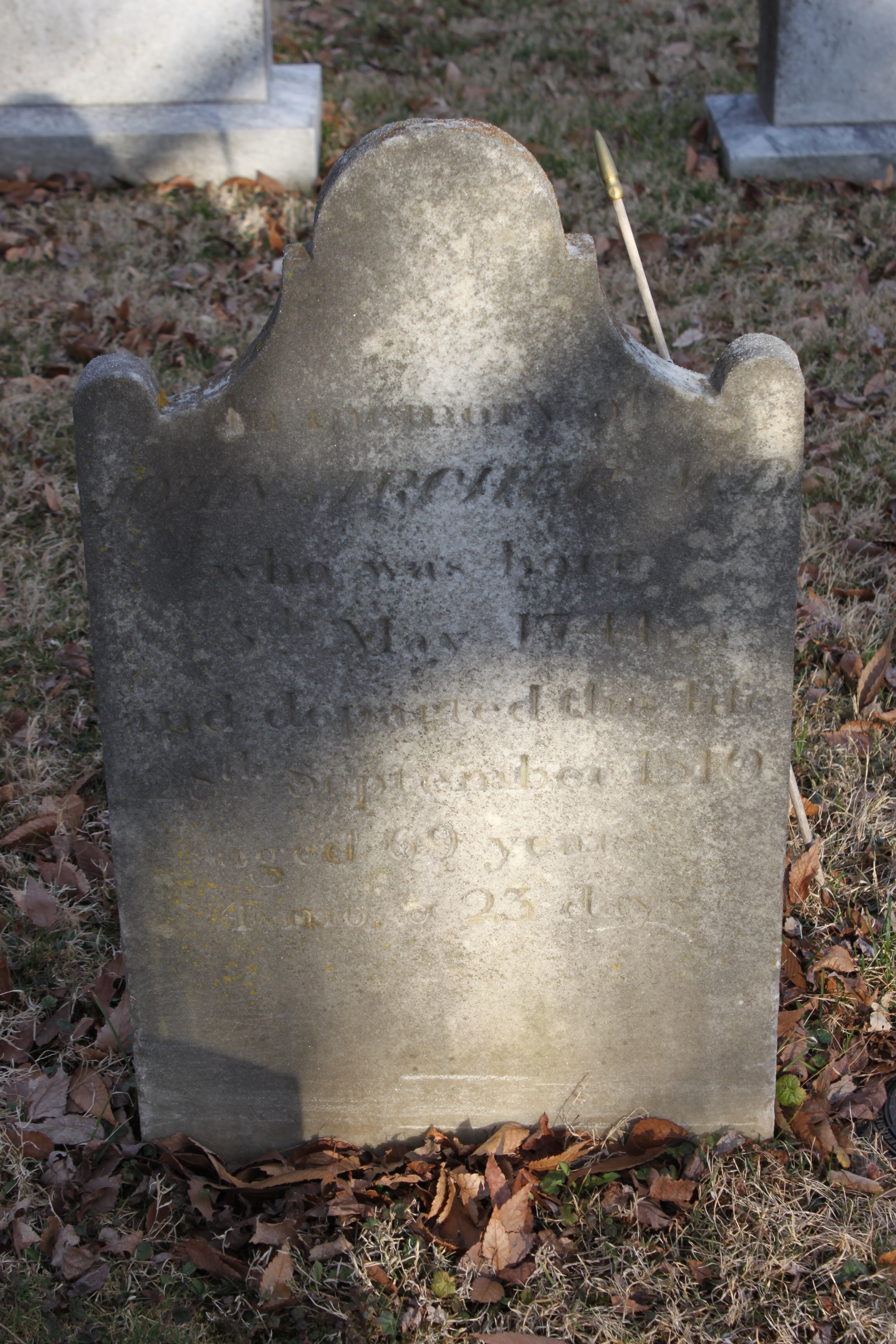
Grave of Archer in Churchville Presbyterian Church cemetery

Archer died at his country home, Medical Hall, near Churchville, Maryland, on September 28, 1810, and is interred in the Churchville Presbyterian Church cemetery.

== Legacy ==
His great-grandson was Stevenson A. Williams.

A descendant of Dr. John Archer, one Henry Wilson Archer and his wife Mary Elizabeth Walker Archer, bought the 65 acre farm "Shamrock" from Ellen Howe Davis in 1850. The farm was retained in the Archer family until 1955 when it was sold to the Sparr Construction Company to become the current development of Shamrock in Bel Air. The mansion on the property, along with five acres, was purchased by Nicholas J. Bonge, and named the "Christian Bible Center". He had plans of restoring the home for a Christian orphanage. After his untimely death in 1961, it was resold and, sadly, burned to the ground by a contingent of 70 Harford County Firemen in October 1963 to make way for the development.<Historical Society of Harford County>

John Archer School, a special education school built in 1971 in Bel Air, was named after Archer. In June 2022, the school board voted to rename the school to Harford Academy on Campus Hill due to Archer's ownership of slaves.

U.S. House of Representatives
| Preceded by Gabriel Christie | U.S. Congressman from the 6th district of Maryland; 1801–1807 | Succeeded by John Montgomery |
