= Churchville, Maryland =

Unincorporated community in Maryland, U.S.

Coordinates: 39°33′40″N 76°14′44″W

Churchville is an unincorporated community in Harford County, Maryland, United States, situated between the county seat, Bel Air, and Aberdeen, where Aberdeen Proving Ground is located.

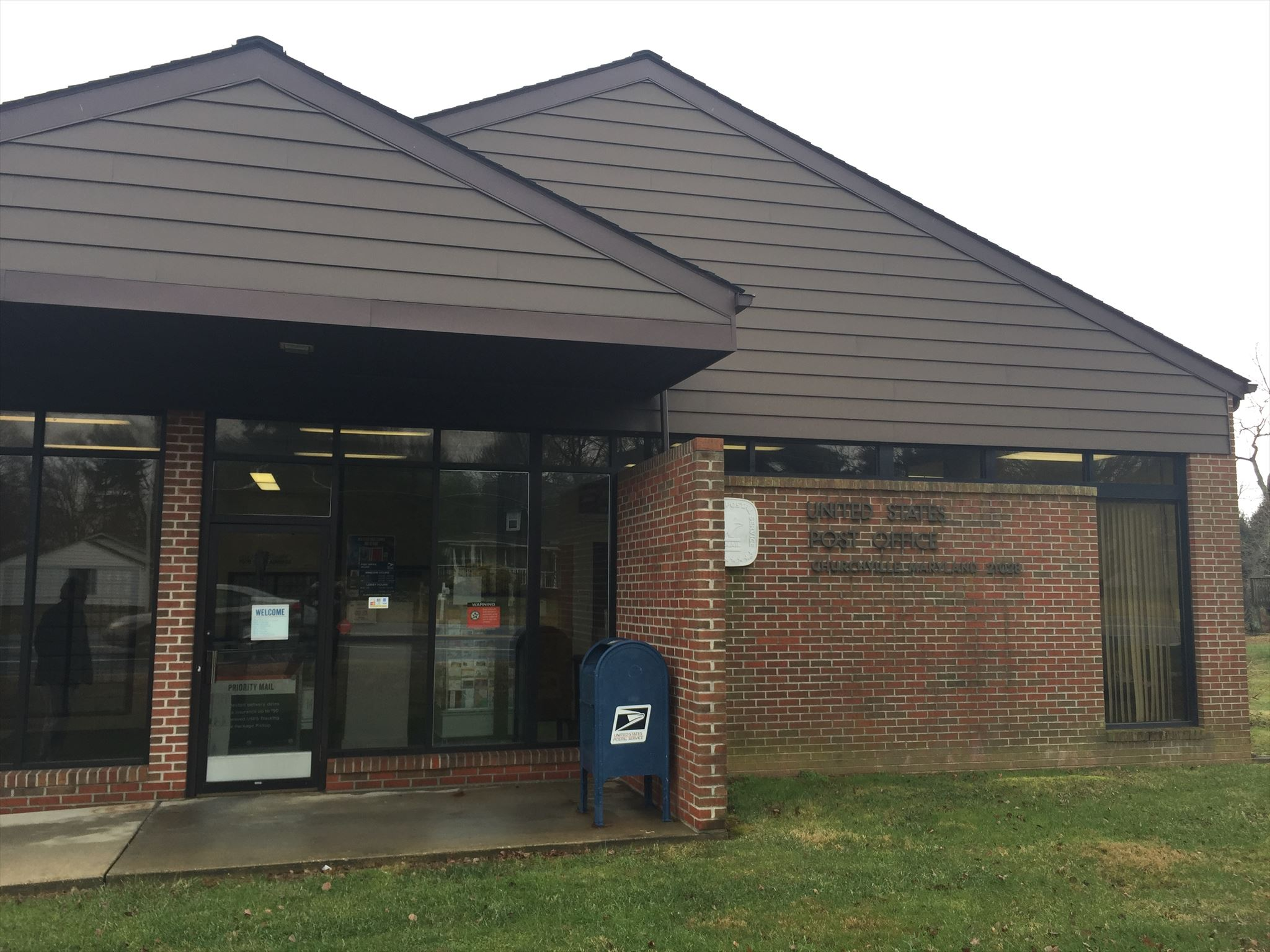
Churchville Post Office (2016)

== Population ==
The population of the area is 2,818.

== History and Lower Cross Roads ==
Because it links Bel Air and Aberdeen (and indirectly, the only other incorporated town in Harford County, Havre de Grace), Churchville was once known in colonial times as Lower Cross Roads. The town has agricultural origins and is known for its many picturesque churches, particularly Churchville Presbyterian Church, at the center of town, Smith's Chapel United Methodist Church and Holy Trinity Episcopal Church.

Churchville was once home to the Archers, a prominent family in Maryland and United States history. Their home, Medical Hall, still stands in Churchville, and several of the Archer family are buried in the cemetery at Churchville Presbyterian Church.

Churchville is home to the champion Little-leaf Linden of Maryland, which made its debut on the list of American Forests Champion Trees in 2018. It is the largest known tree of its species in the country.

Best Endeavor, Church of the Holy Trinity, Churchville Presbyterian Church, Finney Houses Historic District, Medical Hall Historic District, and Webster's Forest are listed on the National Register of Historic Places.

The official motto, "We've got corn, we've got straw, welcome to Churchville, yee-haw!" has its origins tied to the town's rural agricultural past, although the exact manner and date of the phrase's creation remains contested by area historians.

An abandoned Crown gas station, in central Churchville, was used for a scene in the Netflix original series House of Cards in 2016. After its usage by Netflix, the gas station was left abandoned, in which residents, who had signed a demolition petition, criticized the county for not utilizing the money generated from the production to remove the building. Crown has also been criticized for its lackluster effort to purify the soil below the station when the fuel tanks were removed after its closing.

== Notable people ==
- John Archer, (1741–1810), born in Churchville, recipient of the first medical diploma issued in the United States and United States Congressman from Maryland
- Stevenson Archer, (1786–1848), born in Churchville, John Archer's son, also a United States Congressman and Chief Justice of the Maryland Court of Appeals
- Stevenson Archer, (1827–1898), born in Churchville, son of Stephenson Archer and grandson of John Archer, also a United States Congressman

== Schools and services ==
- Churchville Elementary School - 2935 Level Road, Churchville
- Level Volunteer Fire Hall
