= Maryland Route 623 =

State highway in Maryland, United States

Maryland Route 623

Route information
- Maintained by MDSHA
- Length: 7.26 mi (11.68 km)
- Existed: 1936–present

Major junctions
- South end: MD 161 in Darlington
- US 1 in Darlington
- North end: SR 2043 near Flintville

Location
- Country: United States
- State: Maryland
- Counties: Harford

Highway system
- Maryland highway system; Interstate; US; State; Scenic Byways
| ← MD 619 | → MD 624 |

Maryland Route 623 (MD 623) is a state highway in the U.S. state of Maryland. The state highway runs 7.26 miles (11.68 km) from MD 161 in Darlington north to State Route 2043 (SR 2043) at the Pennsylvania state line in Flintville. The first section of MD 623 was constructed in the mid-1930s south from the state line. The state highway was extended south to Darlington in two segments in the 1950s.

== Route description ==
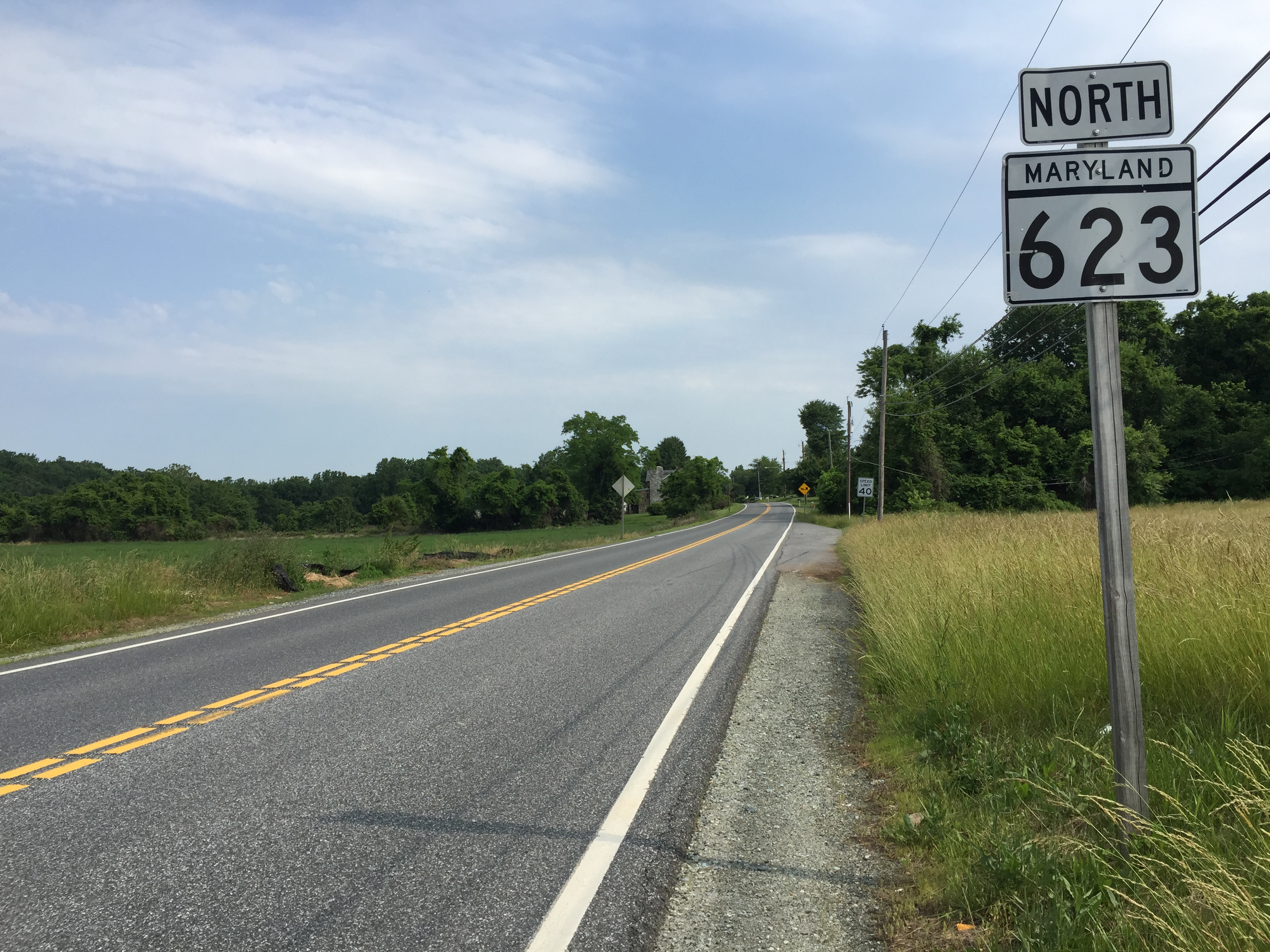
View north along MD 623 northwest of Berkley

MD 623 begins at an intersection with MD 161 (Darlington Road) in the village of Darlington. The state highway heads north as two-lane undivided Castleton Road and quickly meets U.S. Route 1 (US 1, Conowingo Road), with a weigh station serving US 1 at the northeast quadrant of the intersection. MD 623 passes through the community of Berkley centered on the highway's intersection with Berkley Road. The area is part of the Berkley Crossroads Historic District, which contains the Berkley School and the Rigbie House. MD 623 intersects Glen Cove Road and crosses Peddler Run in the village of Castleton before curving to the west. The state highway turns north onto Flintville Road, which heads through a forested area. MD 623 veers northwest and crosses Broad Creek, which is wide at this point from the backwater of the Susquehanna River from Conowingo Dam. The state highway passes through the hamlet of Flintville before reaching its northern terminus at the Pennsylvania state line. Flintville Road continues north as SR 2043 in Peach Bottom Township in the southeast corner of York County.

== History ==
The first section of MD 623 was constructed along Flintville Road from the Pennsylvania state line to south of Susquehanna Hall Road around 1936. Flintville Road was improved from Castleton Road to near Susquehanna Hall Road in 1950 and 1951. MD 623 was extended south to Castleton Road in 1953 and to US 1 in 1956. The highway's southern terminus was moved the short distance south to MD 161 in 1978.

== Junction list ==
The entire route is in Harford County.

| Location | mi | km | Destinations | Notes |
|---|---|---|---|---|
| Darlington | 0.00 | 0.00 | MD 161 (Main Street) – Havre de Grace | Southern terminus |
| Darlington | 0.19 | 0.31 | US 1 (Conowingo Road) – Bel Air, Rising Sun | |
| Flintville | 7.26 | 11.68 | SR 2043 north (Flintville Road) – Peach Bottom Township | Pennsylvania state line; northern terminus |
1.000 mi = 1.609 km; 1.000 km = 0.621 mi
