= Maryland Route 161 =

State highway in Harford County, Maryland, US

Maryland Route 161
- Maryland Route 161 highlighted in red

Route information
- Maintained by MDSHA
- Length: 5.38 mi (8.66 km)
- Existed: 1927–present
- Tourist routes: Lower Susquehanna Scenic Byway

Major junctions
- South end: MD 155 in Hopewell Village
- MD 623 in Darlington
- North end: US 1 in Darlington

Location
- Country: United States
- State: Maryland
- Counties: Harford

Highway system
- Maryland highway system; Interstate; US; State; Scenic Byways
← MD 159	→ MD 162

Maryland Route 161 (MD 161) is a state highway in the U.S. state of Maryland. The state highway runs 5.38 miles (8.66 km) from MD 155 in Hopewell Village north to U.S. Route 1 (US 1) in Darlington. MD 161, in conjunction with MD 155, connects Havre de Grace with Susquehanna State Park and northeastern Harford County. The state highway was mostly constructed in the late 1920s and early 1930s.

== Route description ==
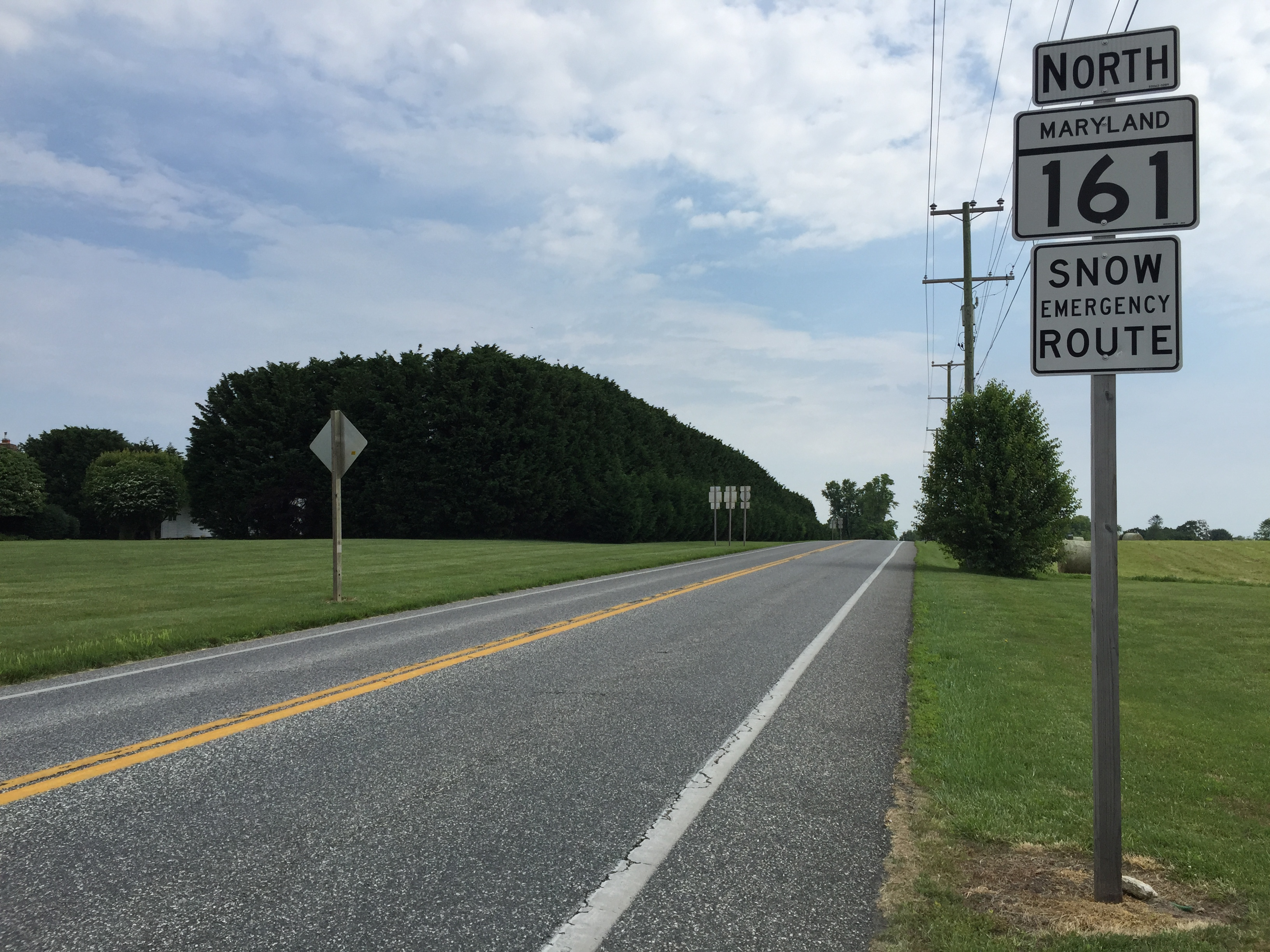
View north from the south end of MD 161 at MD 155 in Hopewell Village

MD 161 begins at an intersection with MD 155 (Level Road) in Hopewell Village, which is also known as Level. The state highway heads north as two-lane undivided Darlington Road through farmland. A short distance north of MD 155, MD 161 intersects Rock Run Road, which heads northeast toward Susquehanna State Park. After passing through the Silver Houses Historic District, the state highway crosses Deer Creek. At Trappe Church Road, MD 161's name changes to Main Street and the highway passes through the village of Darlington, which is contained within its own historic district. At the north end of the village, the state highway meets the southern end of MD 623 (Castleton Road) and passes northeast of the Deer Creek Friends Meetinghouse before reaching its northern terminus at US 1 (Conowingo Road).

== History ==
The first section of MD 161 to be improved was 1 mile (1.6 km) of macadam road from Shuresville Road in Darlington south to Price Road built by 1910. Two sections of macadam road were constructed in 1928. One segment was constructed from Shuresville Road in Darlington north to US 1. The other section was built from the modern intersection of MD 155 and MD 156 northwest to Hopewell Village, along the path of what is now MD 155. The next portion of MD 161 constructed was a concrete road from Level to Harmony Church Road in 1929 and 1930. The gap between Harmony Church Road and Price Road was filled with a concrete road between 1930 and 1932, a project that included a new bridge over Deer Creek.

== Junction list ==
The entire route is in Harford County.

Location	mi	km	Destinations	Notes
Hopewell Village	0.00	0.00	MD 155 (Level Road) to I-95 – Havre de Grace, Churchville	Southern terminus
Darlington	5.17	8.32	MD 623 north (Castleton Road) – Castleton	Southern terminus of MD 623
Darlington	5.38	8.66	US 1 (Conowingo Road) – Bel Air, Rising Sun	Northern terminus
1.000 mi = 1.609 km; 1.000 km = 0.621 mi
