= Darlington, Maryland =

Historic district in Maryland, United States

- Census-designated place
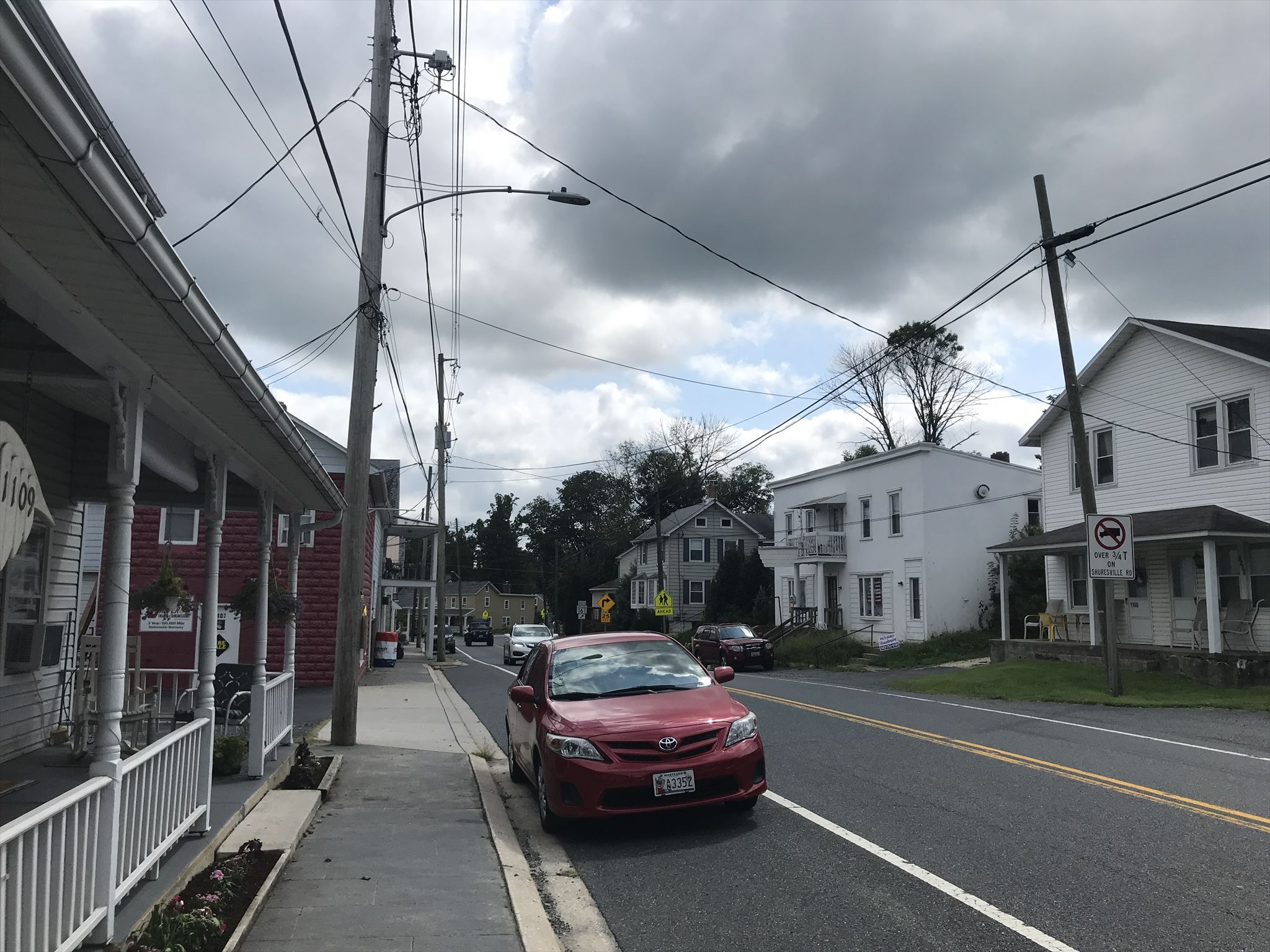
- Downtown Darlington (August 2021)

- Location within Maryland Location within the United States
- Coordinates: 39°38′21″N 76°12′10″W
- Country: United States
- State: Maryland
- County: Harford

Area
  - Total: 1.05 sq mi (2.71 km^{2})
  - Land: 1.05 sq mi (2.71 km^{2})
  - Water: 0 sq mi (0.00 km^{2})
- Elevation: 330 ft (100 m)

Population (2020)
  - Total: 398
  - Density: 380.8/sq mi (147.02/km^{2})
- Time zone: UTC−5 (Eastern (EST))
  - Summer (DST): UTC−4 (EDT)
- ZIP code: 21034
- Area codes: 410 and 443 and 667
- FIPS code: 24-21800

Darlington is an unincorporated community and census-designated place in northeastern Harford County, Maryland, United States. The population was 409 at the 2010 census. The center of the community was listed on the National Register of Historic Places as the Darlington Historic District in 1987. Median household income is $66,563. The percentage of people in poverty is 5.3%.

== Geography ==
Darlington is located in northeastern Harford County at 39°30′10″N 76°19′8″W (39.502757, −76.318971), along Maryland Route 161. U.S. Route 1 crosses the northern side of the community, leading northeast 65 miles (105 km) to Philadelphia and southwest 35 miles (56 km) to Baltimore. Route 1 crosses the Susquehanna River at Conowingo Dam, 2 miles (3 km) northeast of Darlington. Havre de Grace is 11 miles (18 km) to the southeast via Routes 161 and 155.

According to the United States Census Bureau, the Darlington CDP has a total area of 1.05 square miles (2.72 km^{2}), all land.

== Demographics ==
Historical population
Census	Pop.	Note	%±
2010	409		—
2020	398		−2.7%
U.S. Decennial Census

== Historic sites ==
The southern part of the CDP, south of Shuresville Road, is part of the Darlington Historic District, listed on the National Register of Historic Places (NRHP) in 1987. There are approximately 100 contributing properties, including buildings by architects such as Theophilus Parsons Chandler Jr. and Walter Cope. The village was also home to Harry Webb Farrington.

Other sites listed on the NRHP in the community and surrounding region are the Deer Creek Friends Meetinghouse along Main Street near US 1; Berkley Crossroads Historic District and Berkley School, less than 1 mile (1.6 km) north of Darlington on Maryland Route 623; Gray Gables and Wildfell, less than 1 mile to the northwest on US 1; the Lower Deer Creek Valley Historic District, 3 miles (5 km) to the southwest; and the Silver Houses Historic District, 2.5 miles (4.0 km) south of town on Route 161.

== History ==
There is evidence for settlement in the town around 1700, but not much before that time. Darlington had a stagecoach line to Baltimore and a lot of traffic from the Susquehanna and the Tidewater Canal had to go through it.

The Darlington Academy was built in 1836 and used to be a popular school in Harford County. Additionally, almost 100 years later in 1928 the Conowingo Dam was built and made it easier to travel across.

== Community ==
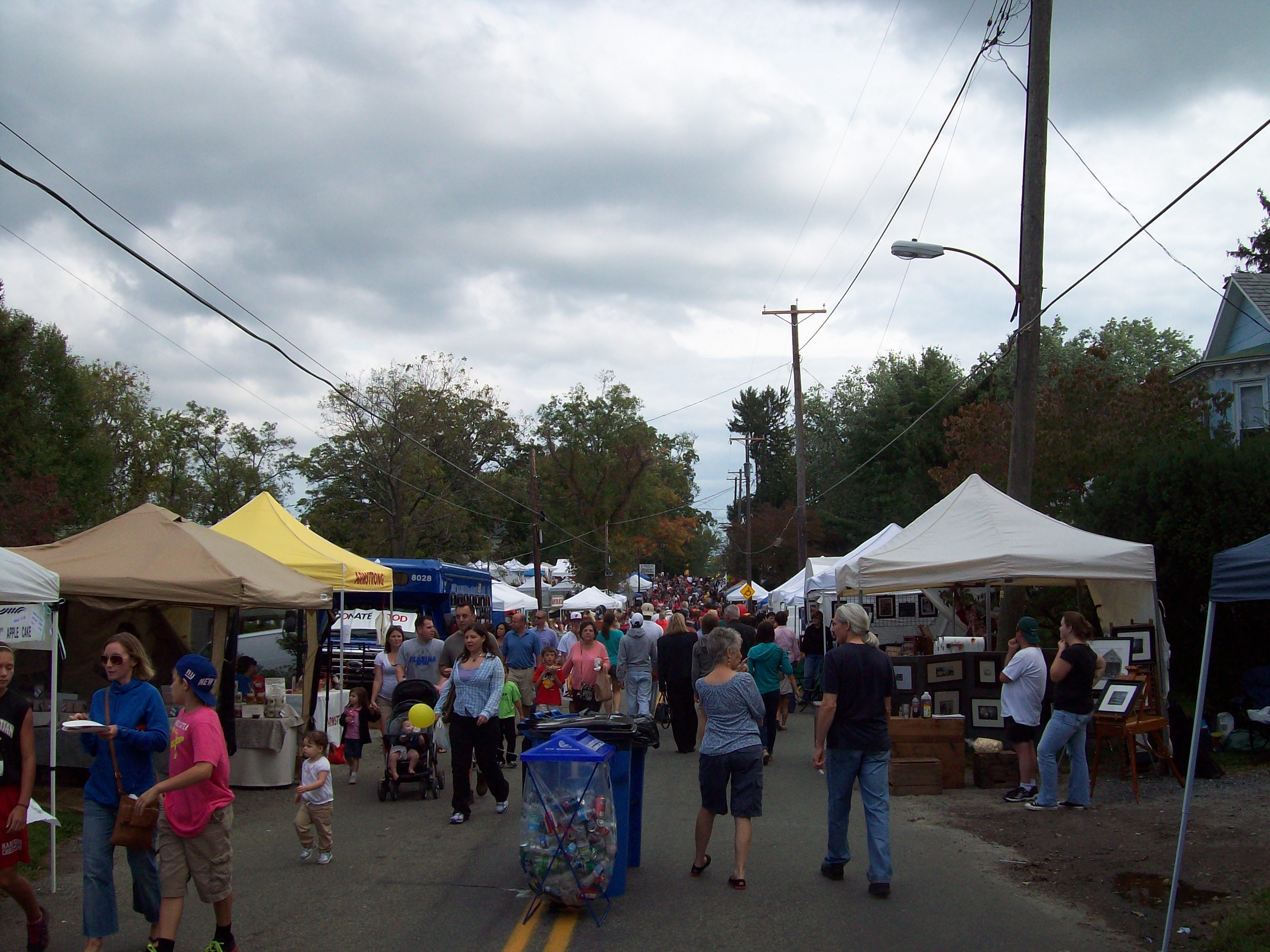
Darlington Apple Festival, 2012

Local children attend the Darlington Elementary School near the center of town. The elementary school has one class per grade level (K through 5), and two autism classrooms. There is no high school in Darlington, so students usually enroll in Havre De Grace High School.

An annual apple festival is held in Darlington the first Saturday in October, and attracts almost 60,000 people.

Darlington and the surrounding communities are provided fire and EMS service by the Darlington Volunteer hobbyist Company.

The Darlington public library, formerly located within the town, was moved to the nearby intersection of Maryland Route 136 and U.S. Route 1 in October 2022. Darlington also has several houses of worship, including Franklin Baptist Church, Harmony Presbyterian Church, Grace Episcopal Church, Darlington United Methodist Church, Deer Creek Friends Meetinghouse, and Hosanna AME Church located in historic Berkley, Maryland.

== Photos of Darlington ==
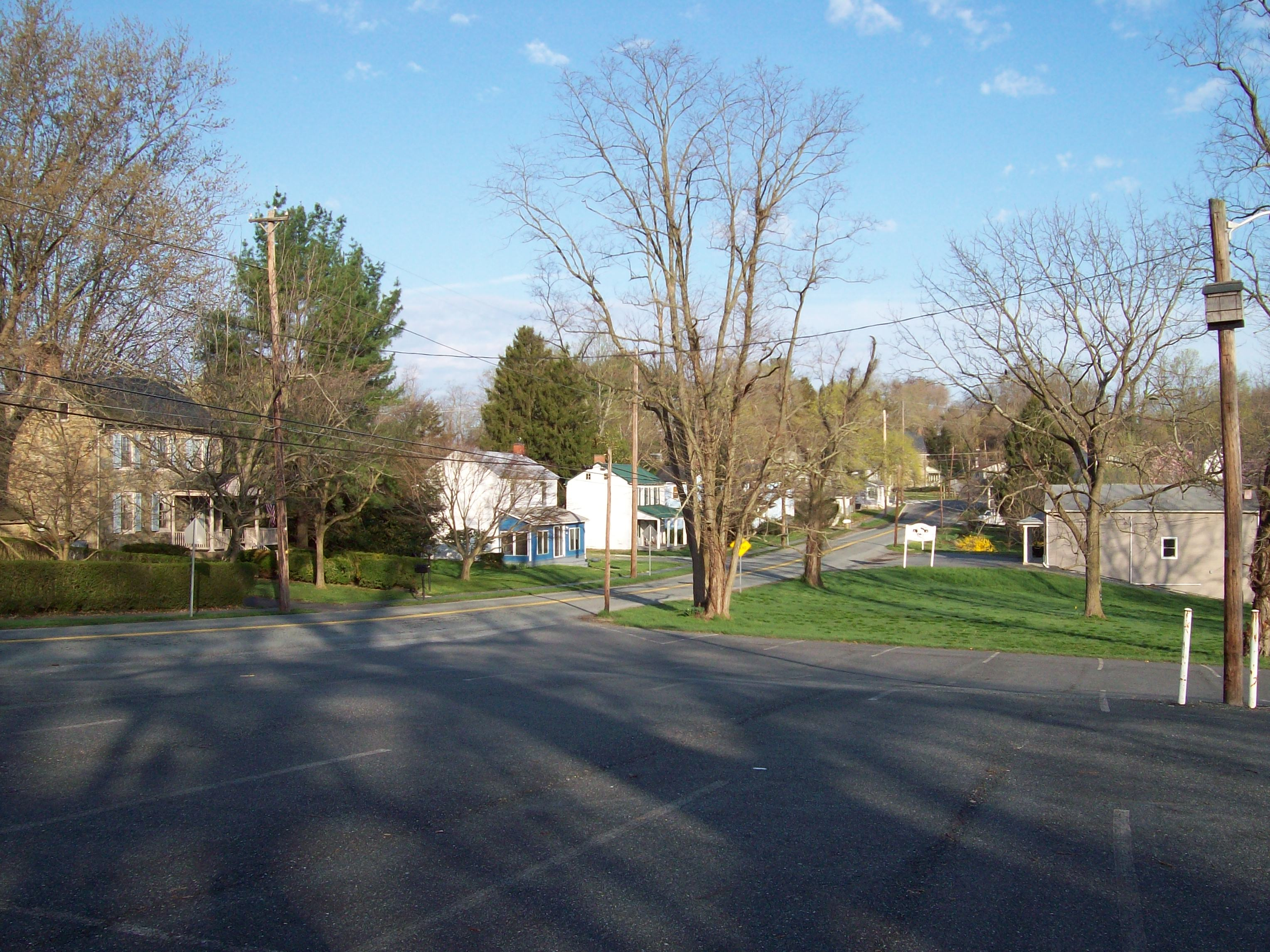
View of Darlington

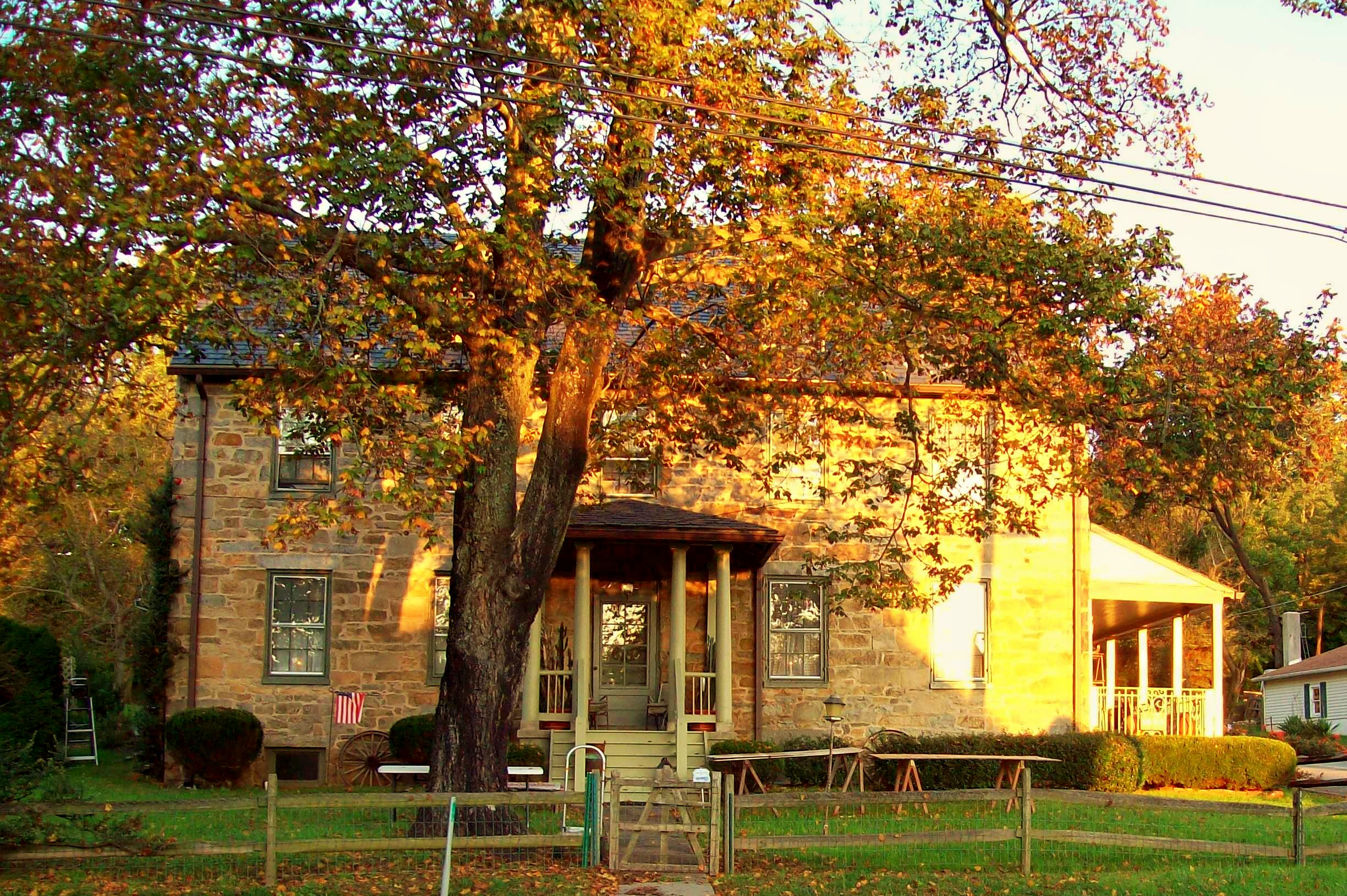
The old Kirk House

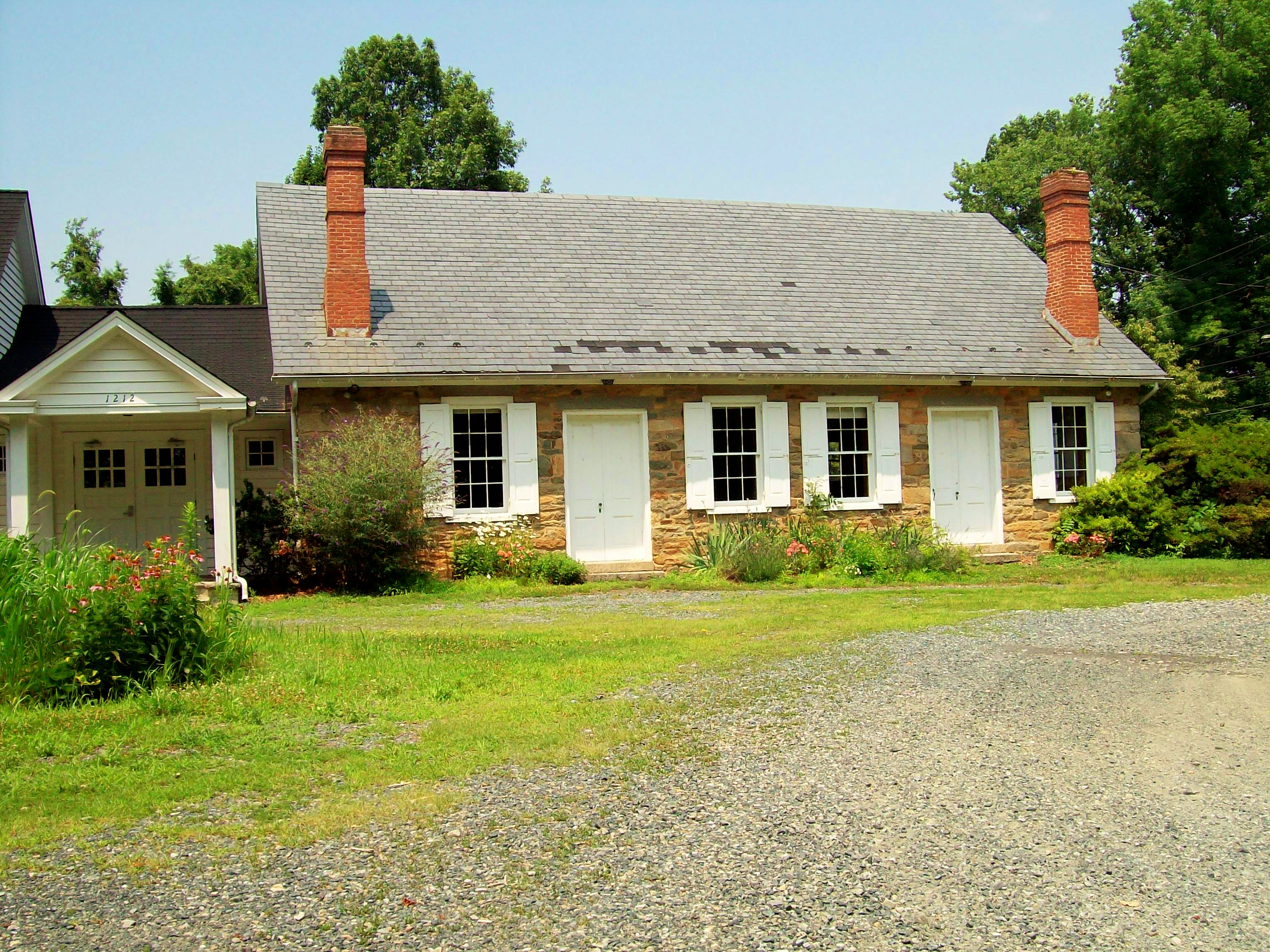
Deer Creek Friends Meetinghouse

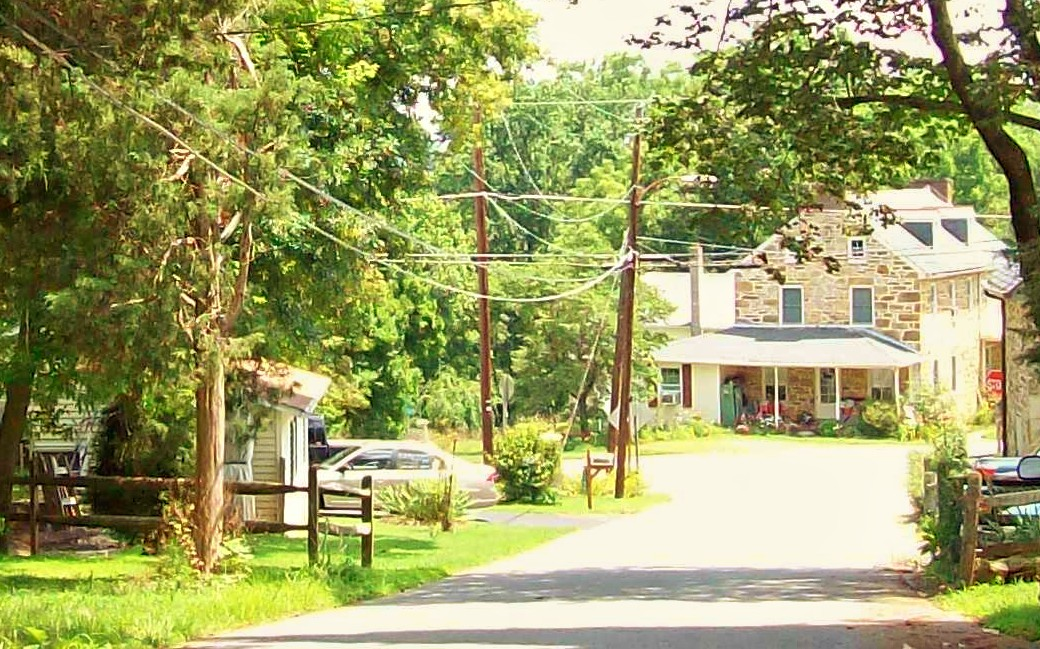
Darlington village

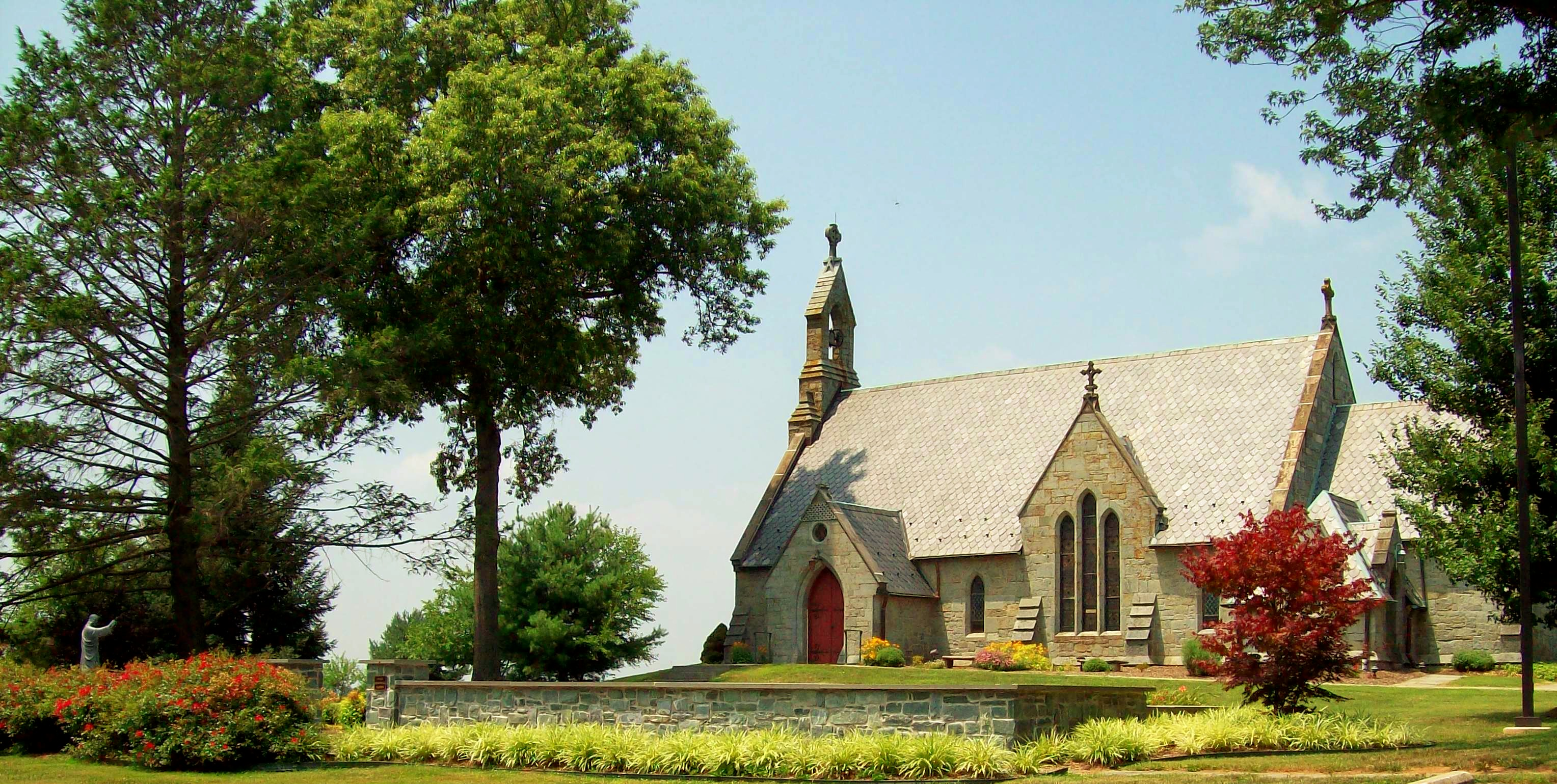
Grace Memorial Episcopal Church (1876–78), Theophilus Parsons Chandler Jr., architect

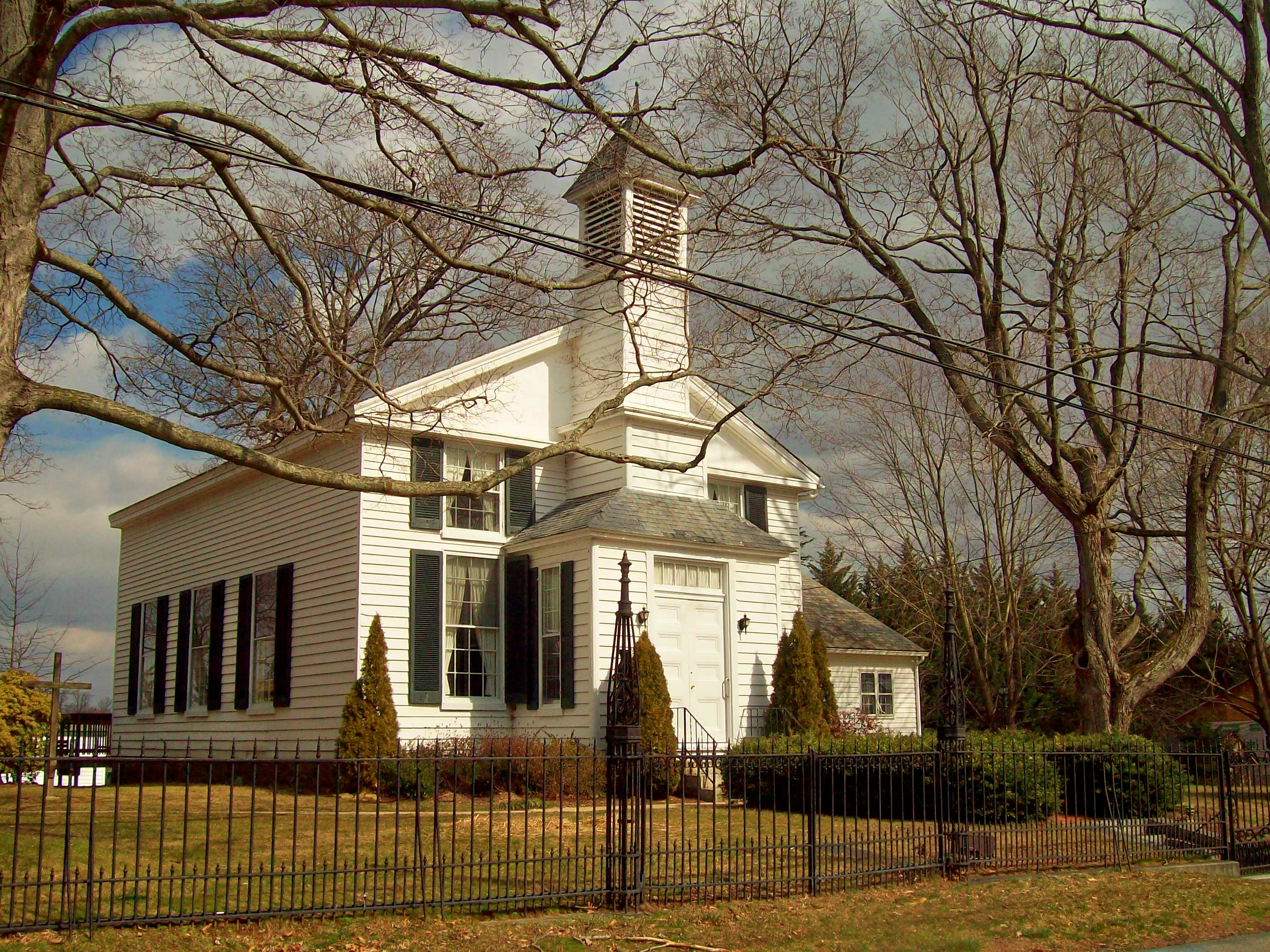
Darlington Methodist Church

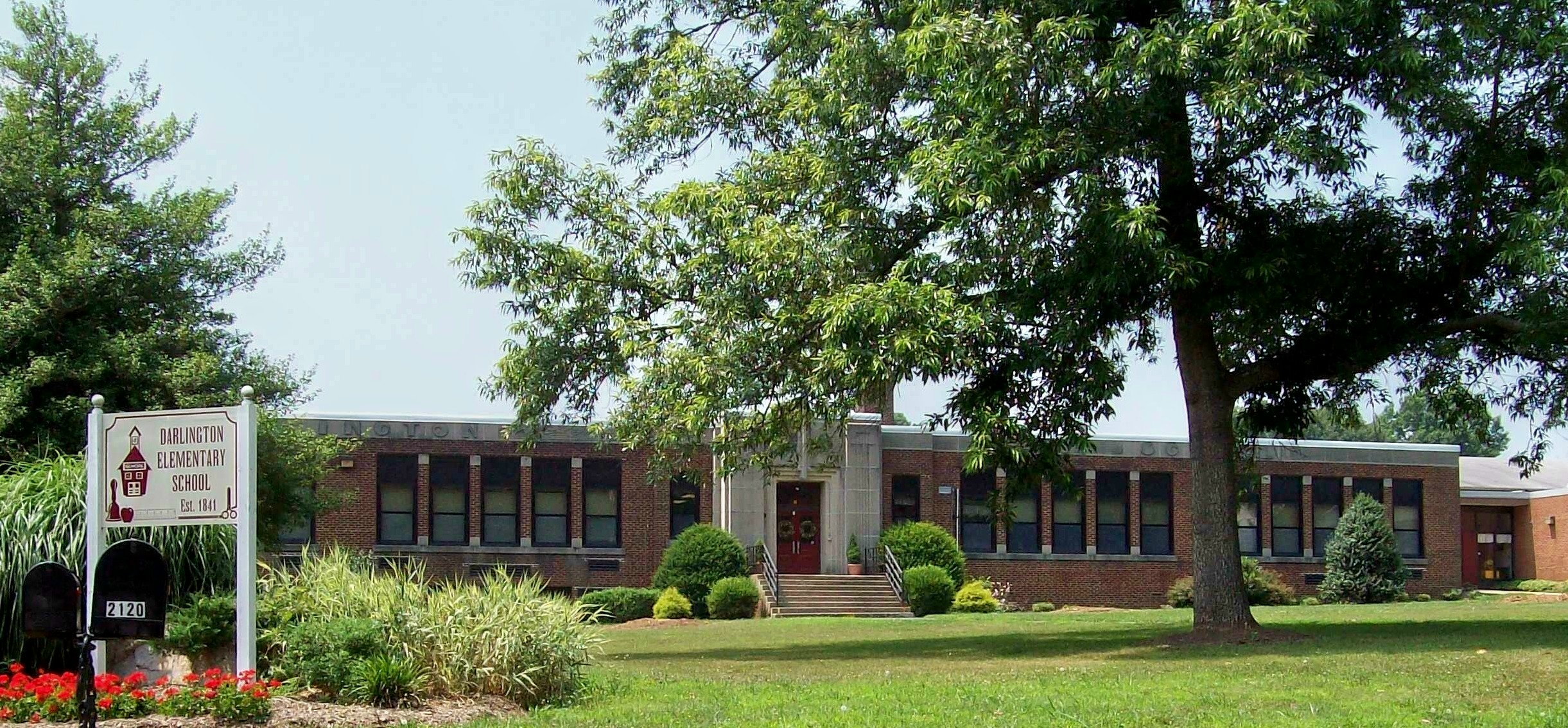
Darlington Elementary School

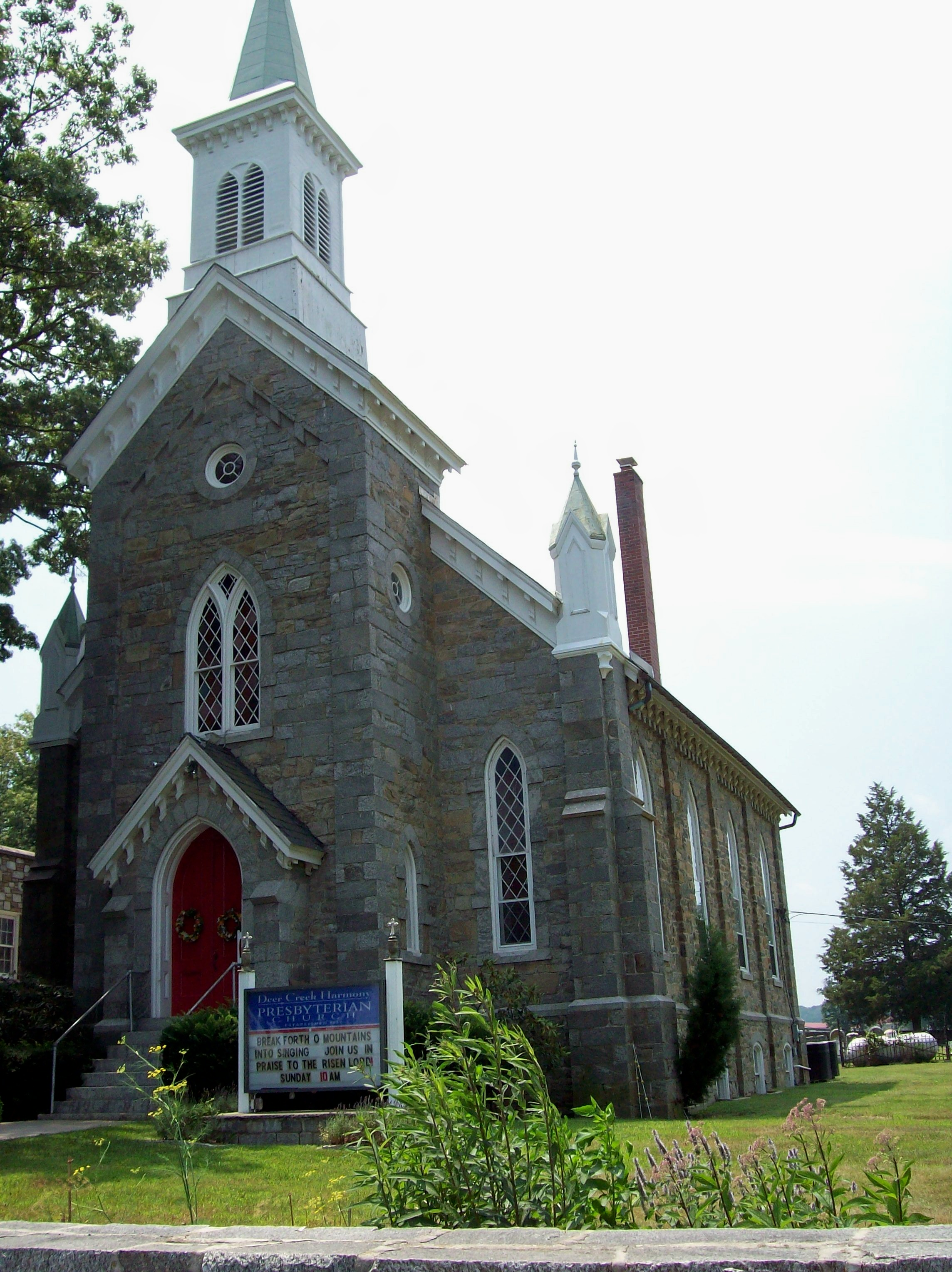
Harmony Presbyterian Church

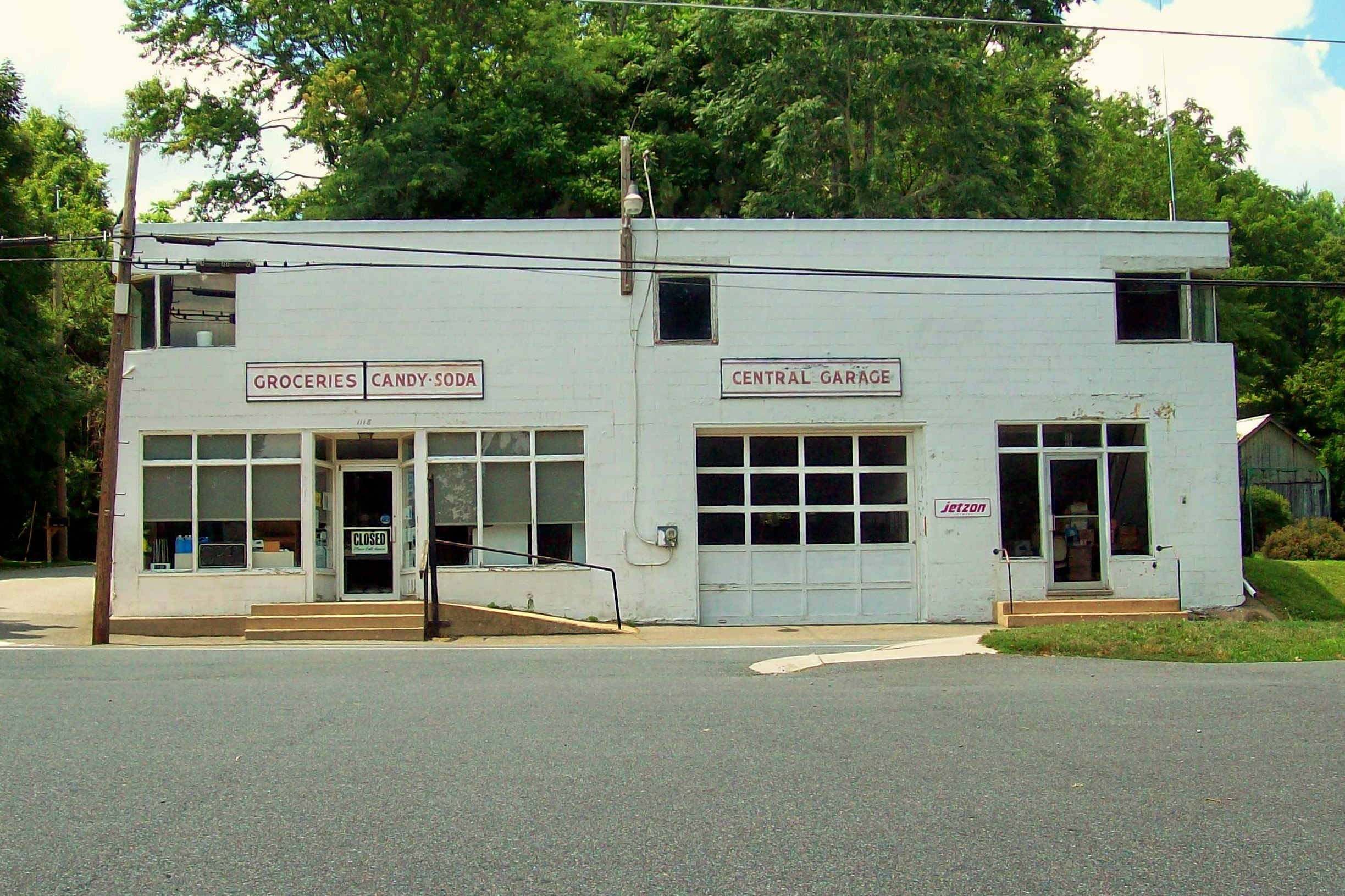
Scarborough General Store and Garage
