= Wildfell =

Historic house in Maryland, United States

- U.S. National Register of Historic Places
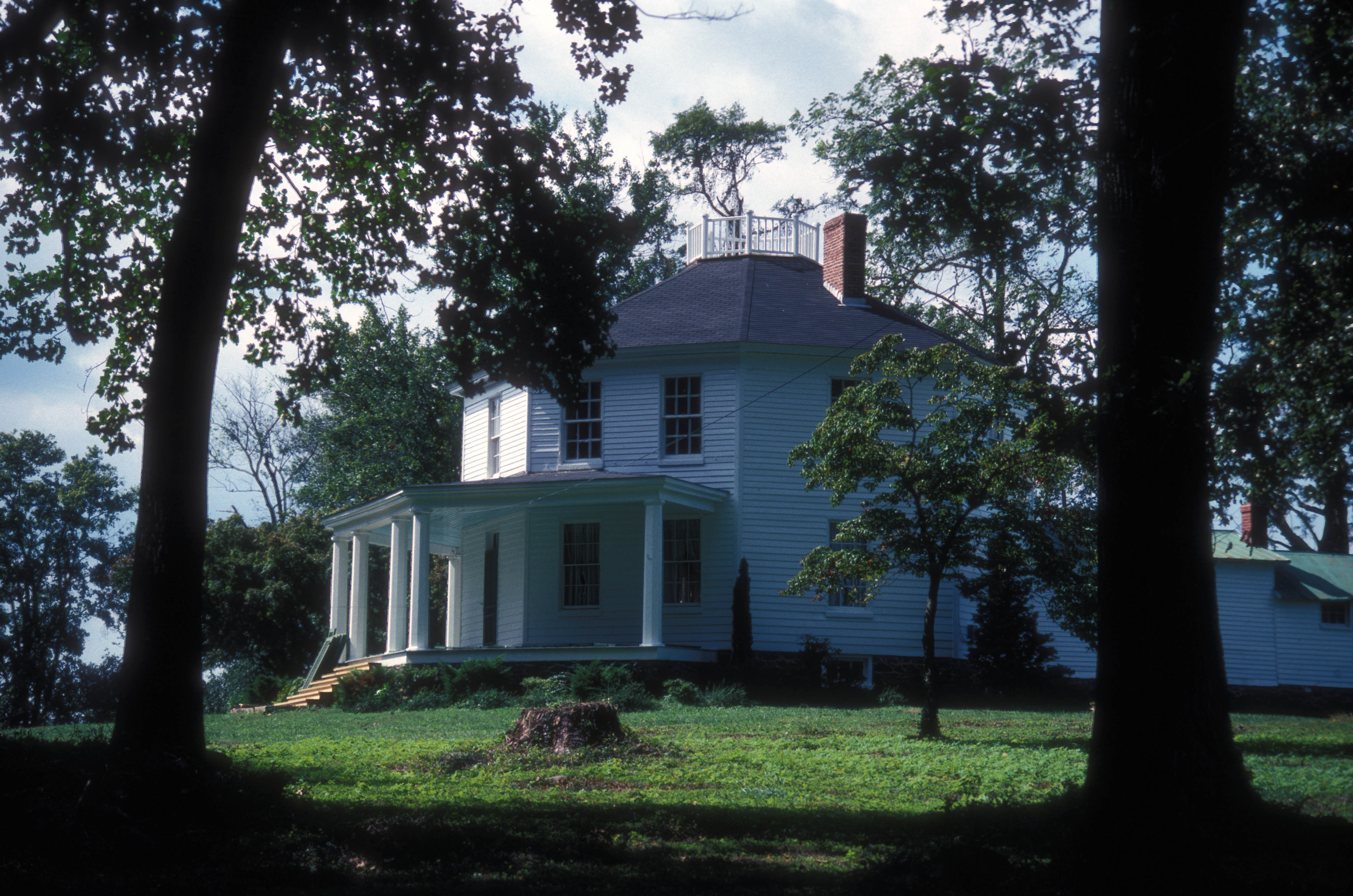
- Wildfell in 1971

- Location within Maryland Location within the United States
- Location: Conowingo Road (US 1), Darlington, Maryland
- Coordinates: 39°39′4″N 76°13′11″W
- Area: 9 acres (3.6 ha)
- Built: c. 1854
- Architect: Jewett, Joseph
- Architectural style: Federal, Octagon
- NRHP reference No.: 73000927
- Added to NRHP: September 20, 1973

Wildfell is a historic home located at Darlington, Harford County, Maryland, United States. It is a two-story, octagonal house of stacked plank construction, featuring an 8-sided roof topped by an octagonal "captains walk," flanked by two brick chimneys. The house has a simplified Federal style. It was built about 1854, and served as summer home for the Jewett family until 1874.

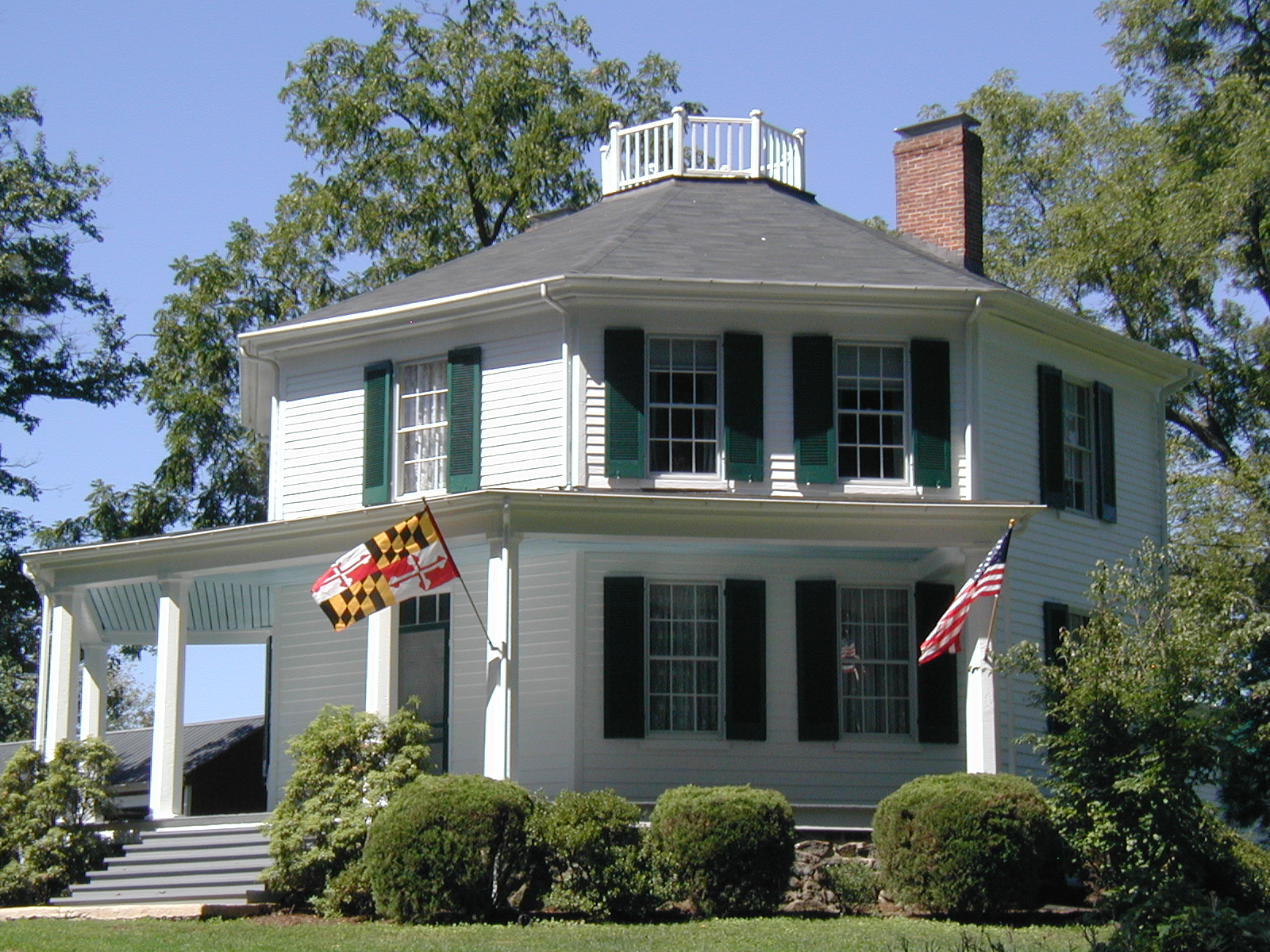
Wildfell

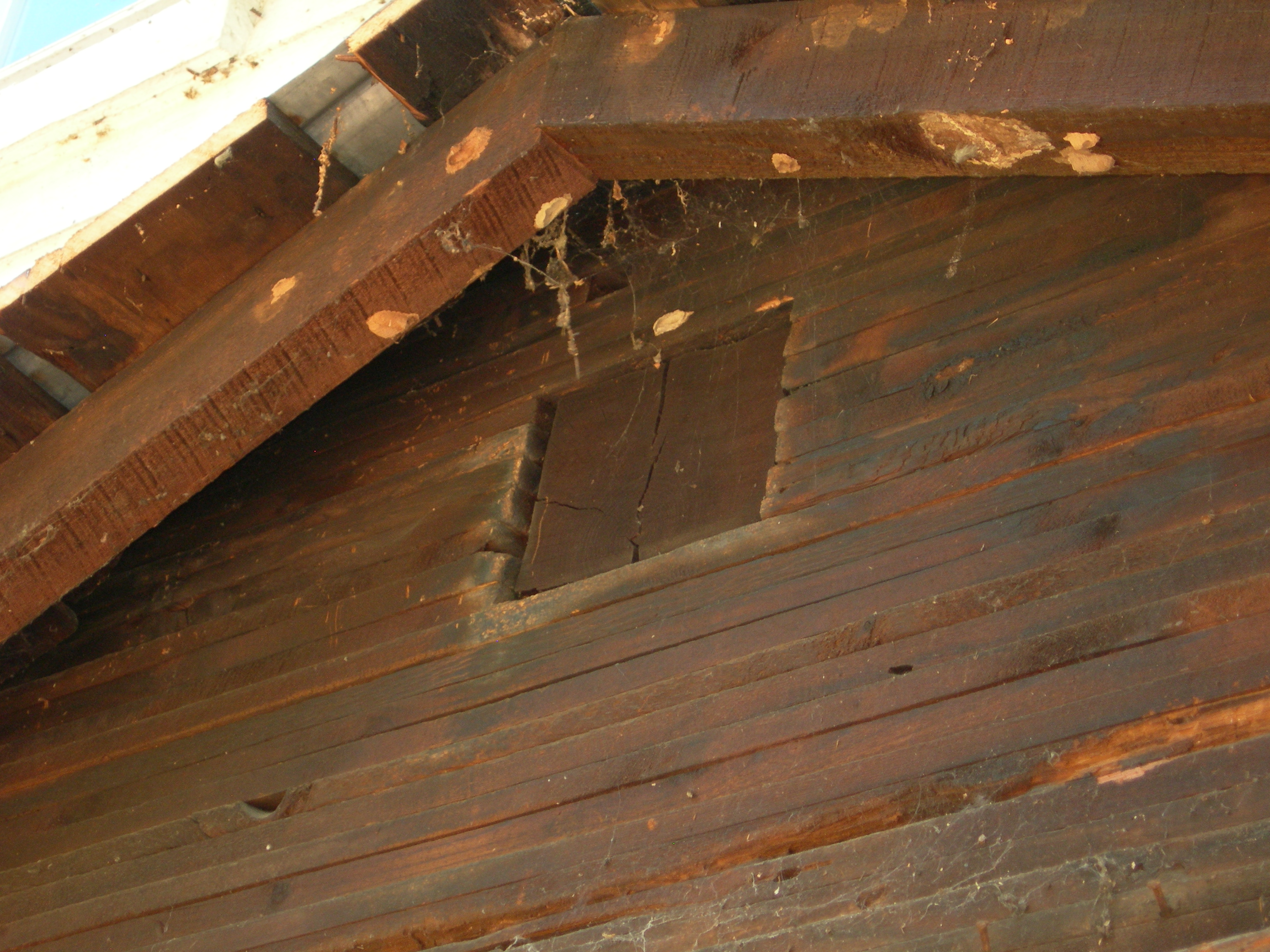
Wildfell beam joist and stacked plank wall construction

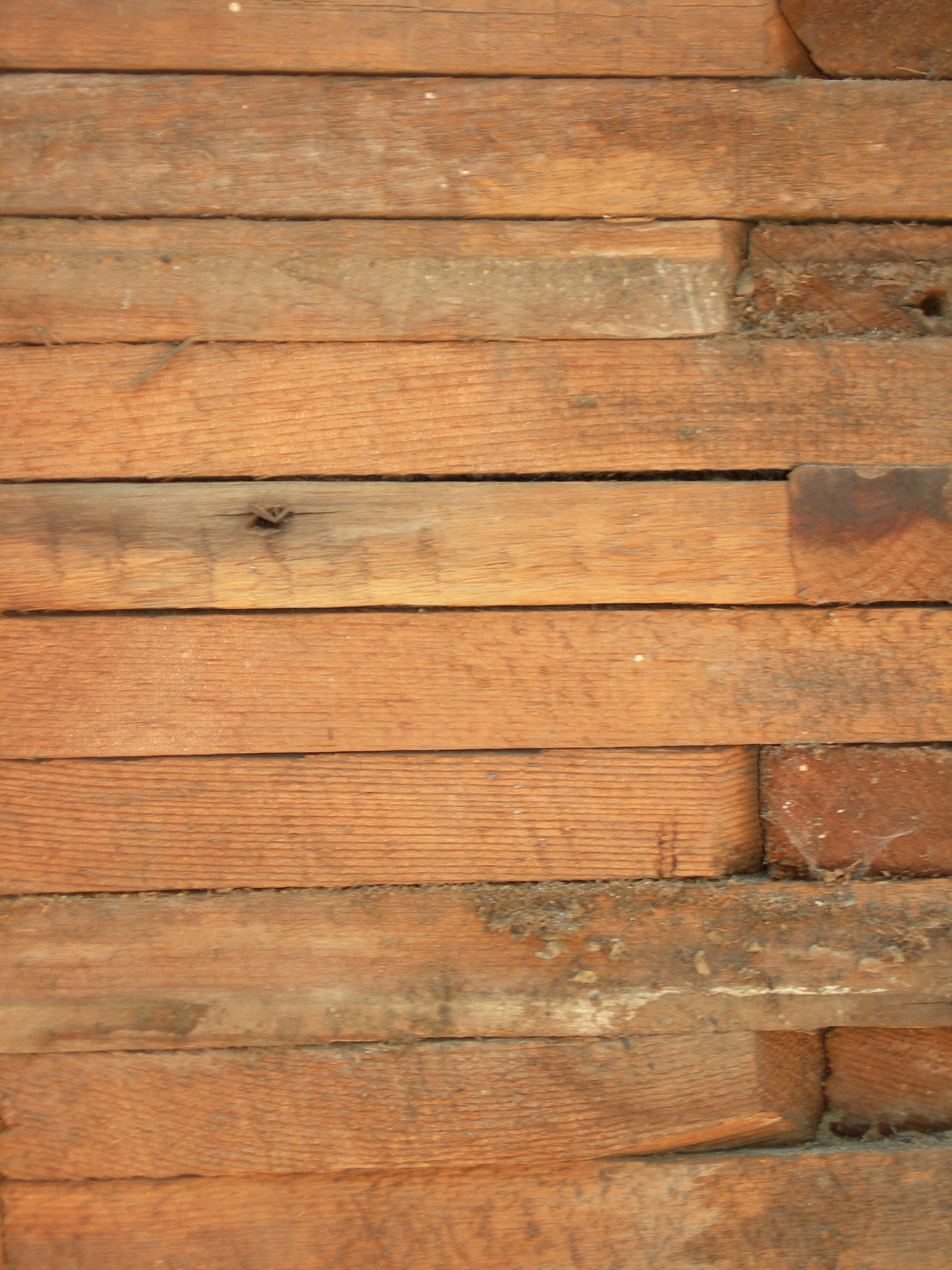
Wildfell stacked plank wall construction

Wildfell is one of the rare octagonal houses built in Maryland at the height of the "Octagon Fad". Located in Darlington, Maryland just off US 1, the house is a prominent feature of Harford County.

Construction is believed to have begun in 1847 with completion prior to 1854. Commissioned by the Joseph Jewett family of Baltimore, Maryland and built by William Hensel. The Jewett family learned of an abandoned Baltimore clipper ship which had served in the War of 1812. The Jewett family purchased the derelict and contracted Hensel (a former naval carpenter) to salvage wood from the vessel and transport materials to the building site in Darlington, MD. The short oak timbers and naval treated planks were well suited to the short walls required by the octagonal design. The interior layout resembles an octagon divided into quadrants. Thus, most rooms have 5 walls.

Two stories high, the octagonal house has an 8-sided roof topped by an octagonal "widows walk" flanked by two brick chimneys which serviced 4 fireplaces in the primary living areas and a hearth in the basement. The house faces southeast, with one or two openings in each wall. A modern one-story wing (constructed 2011, replaced ca.1900 structure) runs northwest. There is a three-sided porch facing east, southeast, and south.

Wildfell is a simplified Federal style, with a molding over the boxed eaves, which is repeated on the porch above its octagonal pillars. The six-paneled front door in a plain frame is topped by a four-light transom. Windows have 6/6 lights behind louvered shutters. The stairway has two turned balusters on each step under a walnut handrail. Double parlors are separated by pocket doors. Original kitchen and dining room spaces are to the rear. Perhaps unique to this house are the exterior and interior load bearing walls whose construction is of narrow (1”x7”) oak planks laid horizontally, nailed from above as the work proceeded, forming a virtually solid 7” wall thickness. The construction method is visible beneath the shutters of the false windows to the left of the front door. The window placement would have opened out from the side of the staircase, but is placed to complete the symmetrical appearance of the house. Floor joists are hand hued timber beams set in a cross pattern and cross joined by lesser beams.

The Jewetts used Wildfell as a summer home from March 1854 until June 1874. The property was sold in 1874 and it came into ownership by the prominent Scott family where it remained for several generations.

Wildfell is listed on the National Register of Historic Places September 20, 1973.

The property is currently owned by Matthew and Bonnie Payne.
