= Darlington Historic District =

Historic district in Maryland, United States

- U.S. National Register of Historic Places
- U.S. Historic district
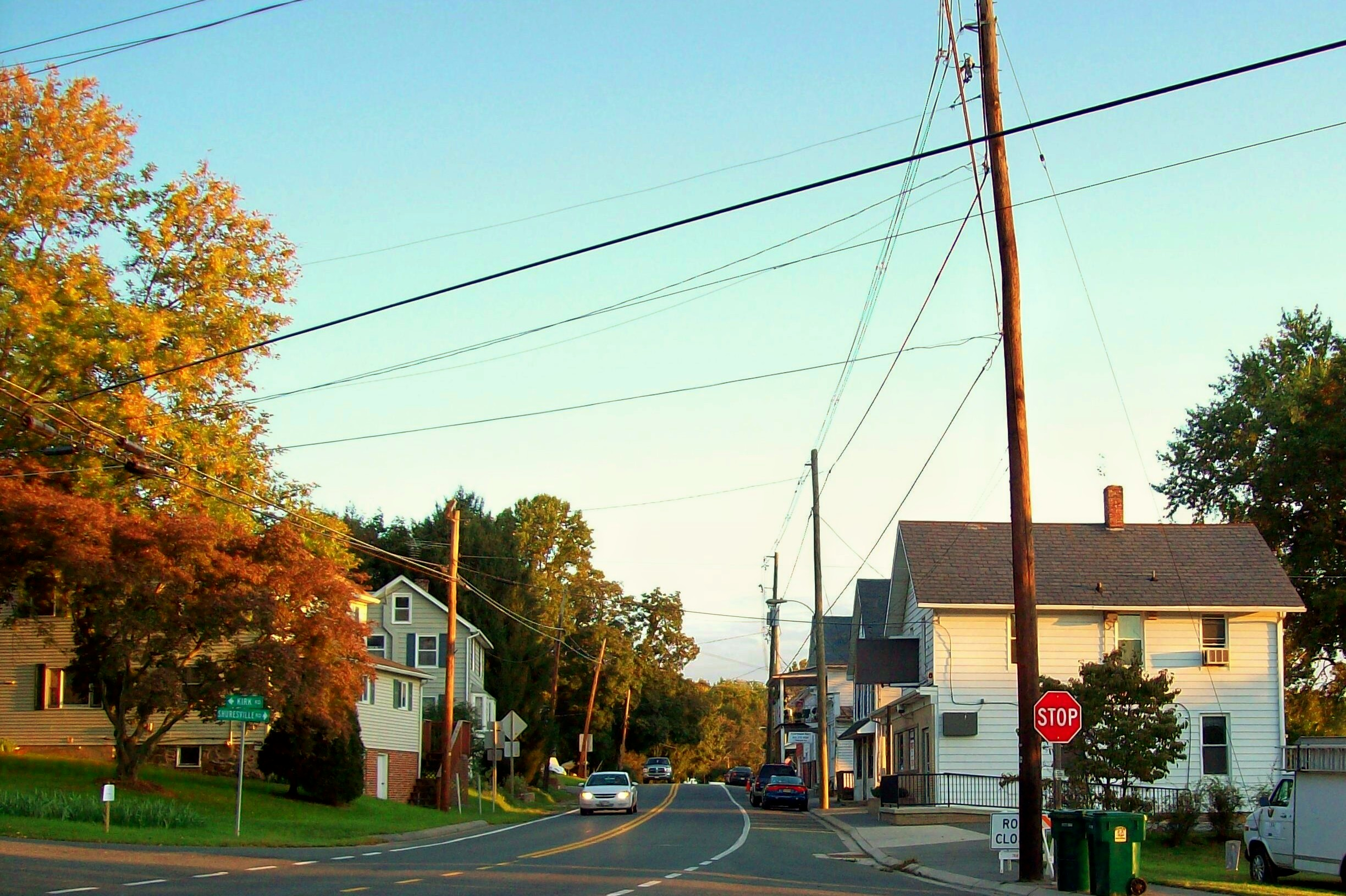
- Main street in Darlington, 2011

- Location within Maryland Location within the United States
- Location: Main St., Shuresville Rd., Quaker Ln., Richmond Ave., and Trappe Church Rd., Darlington, Maryland
- Coordinates: 39°38′23″N 76°12′3″W
- Area: 250 acres (100 ha)
- Architect: Cope, Walter; et al.
- Architectural style: Late Victorian, Art Deco, English Gothic Revival
- NRHP reference No.: 87001571
- Added to NRHP: September 10, 1987

Darlington Historic District is a national historic district at Darlington, Harford County, Maryland, United States. It includes approximately 100 small-scale structures in the village of Darlington. They include four churches including the Darlington United Methodist Church and the Deer Creek Friends Meetinghouse, a dozen shops and stores, barns/garages, meathouses, chicken houses, and other outbuildings, a lodge hall, a grammar school, a cemetery, and three working farms. They date particularly from the late 19th century through the early 20th century.

It was added to the National Register of Historic Places in 1987.

== Gallery ==
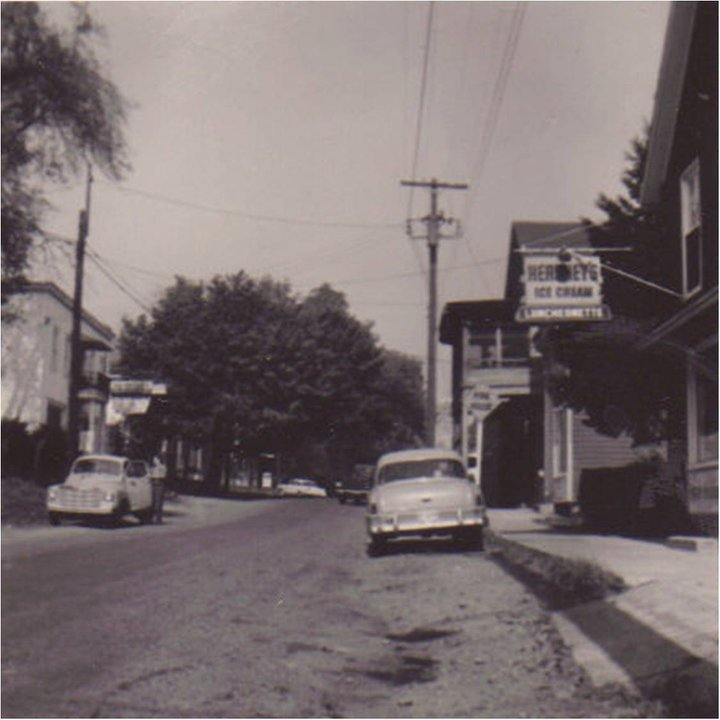
A photograph of the village of Darlington on Main Street in the 1950s.

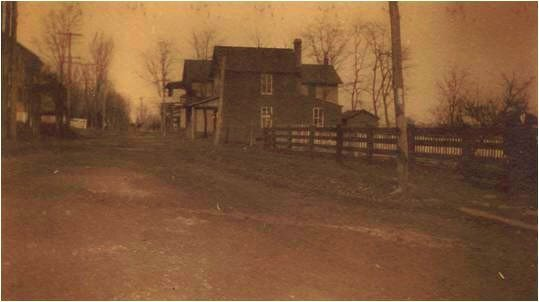
A pre-1910 photograph of the village of Darlington looking northeast from Bailey's Corner (currently the intersection of Shuresville Road and Route 161, or Main Street, and Kirk Road).
