= Rigbie House =

Historic house in Maryland, United States

- U.S. National Register of Historic Places
- Rigbie House in 2011

- Location within Maryland Location within the United States
- Location: Castleton Road (MD 623), Berkley, Maryland
- Coordinates: 39°39′37″N 76°12′12″W
- Area: 18 acres (7.3 ha)
- Built: 1781
- NRHP reference No.: 73000925
- Added to NRHP: August 14, 1973

Rigbie House, also known as "Phillip's Purchase", is a historic home located at Berkley, Harford County, Maryland. It is a 1 1/2-story, frame and stone structure built about 1781. It was one of a series of forest outposts fortified against the Indians and representing Lord Baltimore’s claim of 1632 to land extending north to the 40th parallel. In April 1781, it was the place where the Marquis de Lafayette’s officers quelled a mutiny that might have prevented his army of New England troops, who had been headed homeward, from turning south again to join General Greene and General Washington at Yorktown, in which case that battle might never have been fought.

Phillip's Purchase was a tract of land inherited by Colonel Nathaniel Rigbie in 1708. He moved to the area, originally consisting of approximately 2,000 acres, in 1730 with his wife Cassandra Coale. They built the Rigbie House in 1732. The land covered much of what is now Berkley, Maryland and Darlington, Maryland.

It was listed on the National Register of Historic Places in 1973.
