= Gray Gables (Darlington, Maryland) =

Historic house in Maryland, United States

- U.S. National Register of Historic Places
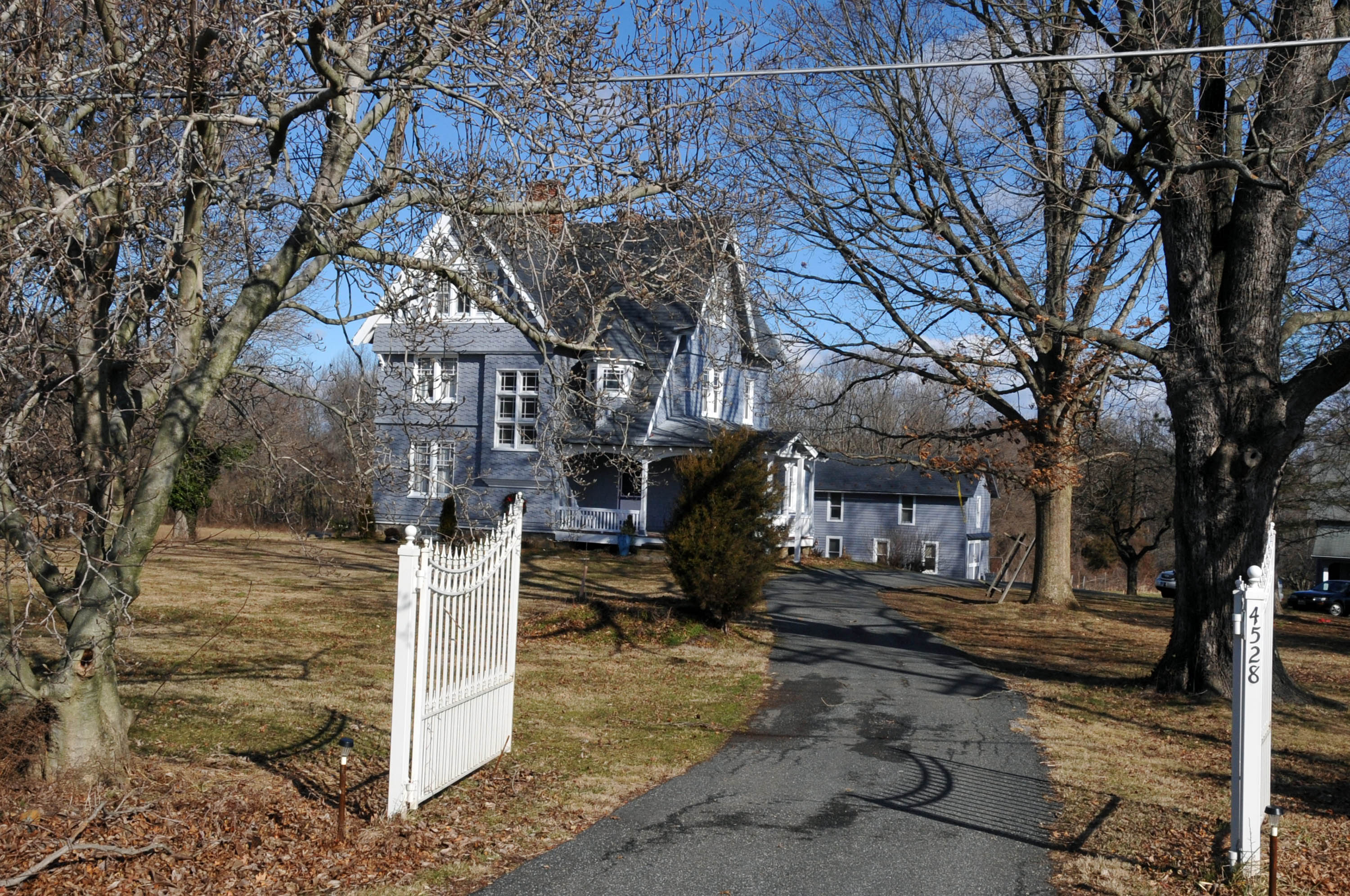
- Gray Gables in 2013

- Location within Maryland Location within the United States
- Location: 4528 Conowingo Road (US 1), Darlington, Maryland
- Coordinates: 39°39′13″N 76°13′15″W
- Area: 14.5 acres (5.9 ha)
- Built: 1885
- Architect: Cope, Walter
- Architectural style: Queen Anne
- NRHP reference No.: 86000582
- Added to NRHP: March 27, 1986

Gray Gables is a historic home located at Darlington, Harford County, Maryland. It is an 1880s Queen Anne style frame house, featuring an irregular plan, projecting bays, steeply pitched multiple gables, and slate roofs. It is an intact example of the early work of Walter Cope (1860–1902), a principal in one of Philadelphia's most important and prestigious architectural firms, Cope and Stewardson.

It was listed on the National Register of Historic Places in 1986.
