= Berkley School =

- U.S. National Register of Historic Places
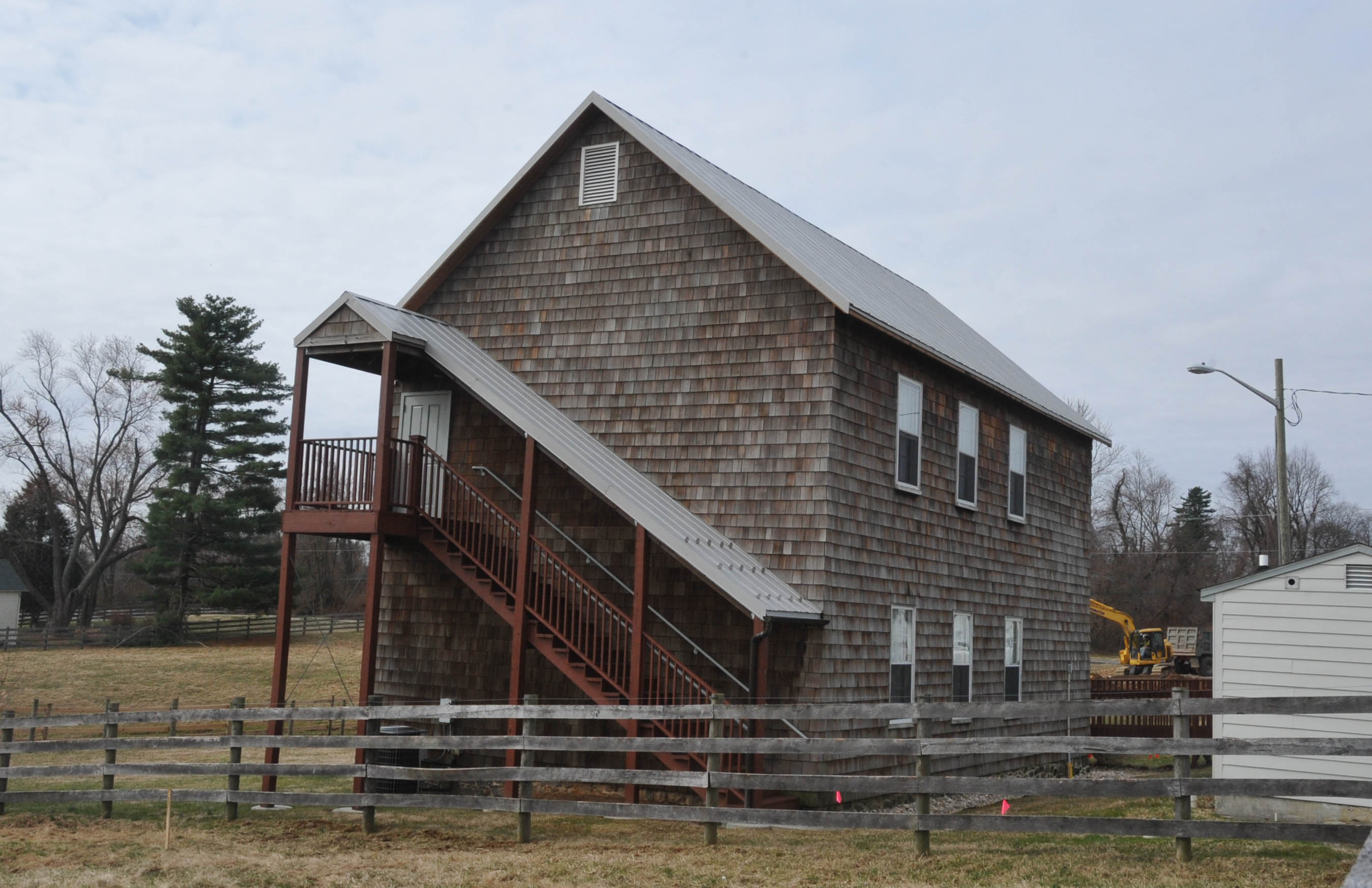
- Berkley School in 2007

- Location within Maryland Location within the United States
- Location: 2424 Castleton Road (MD 623), Darlington, Maryland
- Coordinates: 39°39′29″N 76°12′21″W
- Area: 0.3 acres (0.12 ha)
- Built: 1868
- NRHP reference No.: 88001011
- Added to NRHP: July 22, 1988

Berkley School, also known as Hosanna School, is a historic school for African Americans located in Darlington, Harford County, Maryland. It was built in 1867 and is a rectangular two-story, three-bay frame building which rests on an uncoursed rubble-stone foundation. It is one of four structures erected in Harford County in the years immediately following the Civil War for the purpose of educating freed slaves. The school was officially established with funds provided by the Freedmen's Bureau for construction and teachers salaries. The Harford County School Commissioners took over operation of the School in 1879. It continued to function as a school until 1946 when the school ceased operation. In 1954, Hurricane Hazel destroyed the second story but left the ground floor intact. The second floor was restored in 2005.

It was listed on the National Register of Historic Places in 1988.
