= Silver Houses Historic District =

Historic district in Maryland, United States

- U.S. National Register of Historic Places
- U.S. Historic district
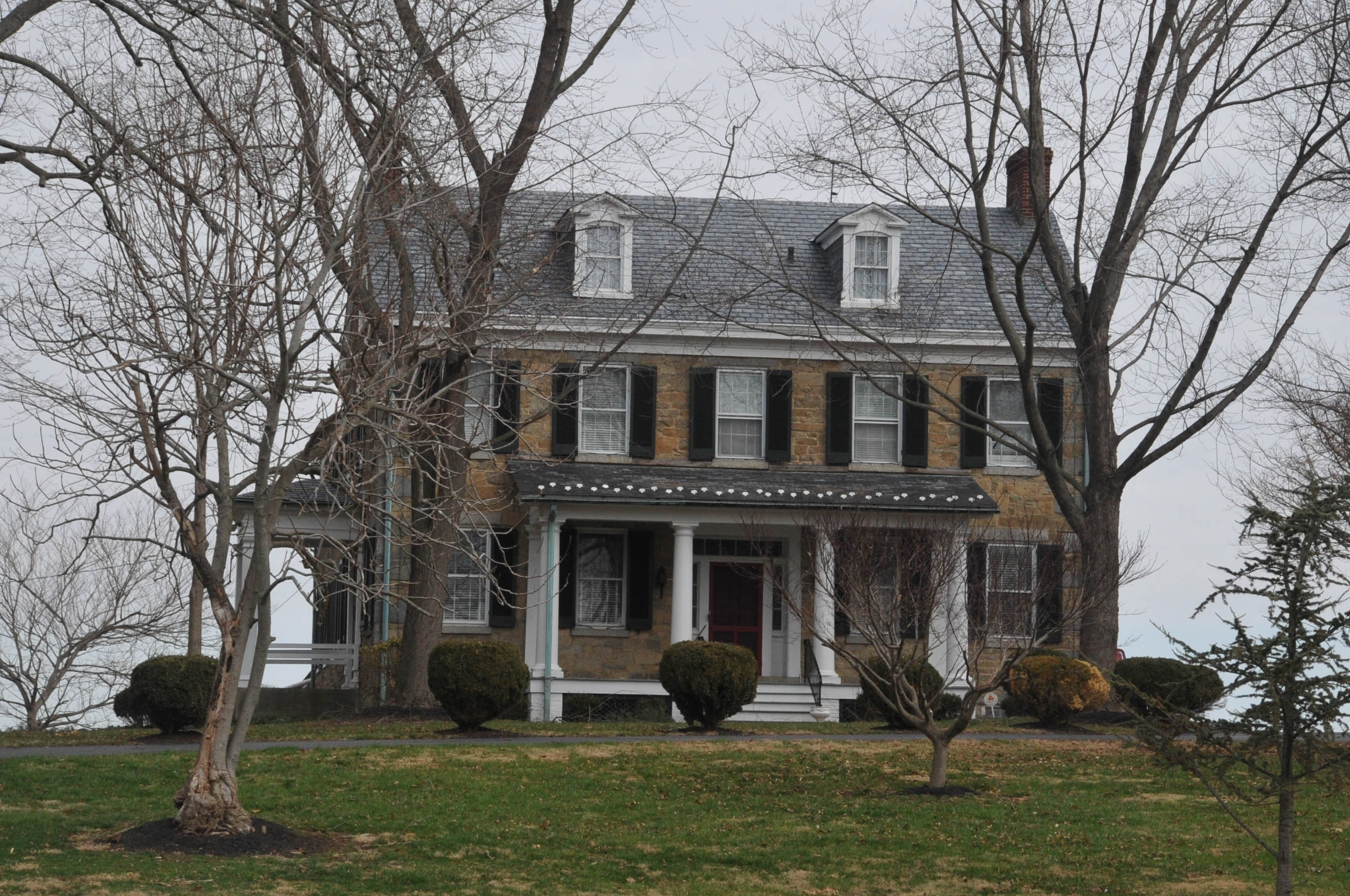
- Benjamin Silver House in 2007

- Location within Maryland Location within the United States
- Location: South of Darlington on Maryland Route 161, Darlington, Maryland
- Coordinates: 39°36′22″N 76°11′47″W
- Area: 280 acres (110 ha)
- Built: 1853
- Architects: Reasin, William H.; Hogg, John W.
- Architectural style: Classical Revival, Late Gothic Revival, Italianate
- NRHP reference No.: 84001800
- Added to NRHP: September 7, 1984

Silver Houses Historic District is a national historic district near Darlington, Harford County, Maryland, United States. It is a group of mid-19th-century farmsteads and a church in rural east-central Harford County. The district comprises a total of 36 resources, including four stone residences with related agricultural outbuildings, and the site of a fifth stone house, marked by a large frame barn, a frame tenant house, and two outbuildings. The houses were built between 1853 and 1859 by members of the Silver family. The district also includes the Deer Creek Harmony Presbyterian Church, a Gothic-influenced stone building of 1871, designed by John W. Hogg.

It was added to the National Register of Historic Places in 1984.

== Contributing properties ==
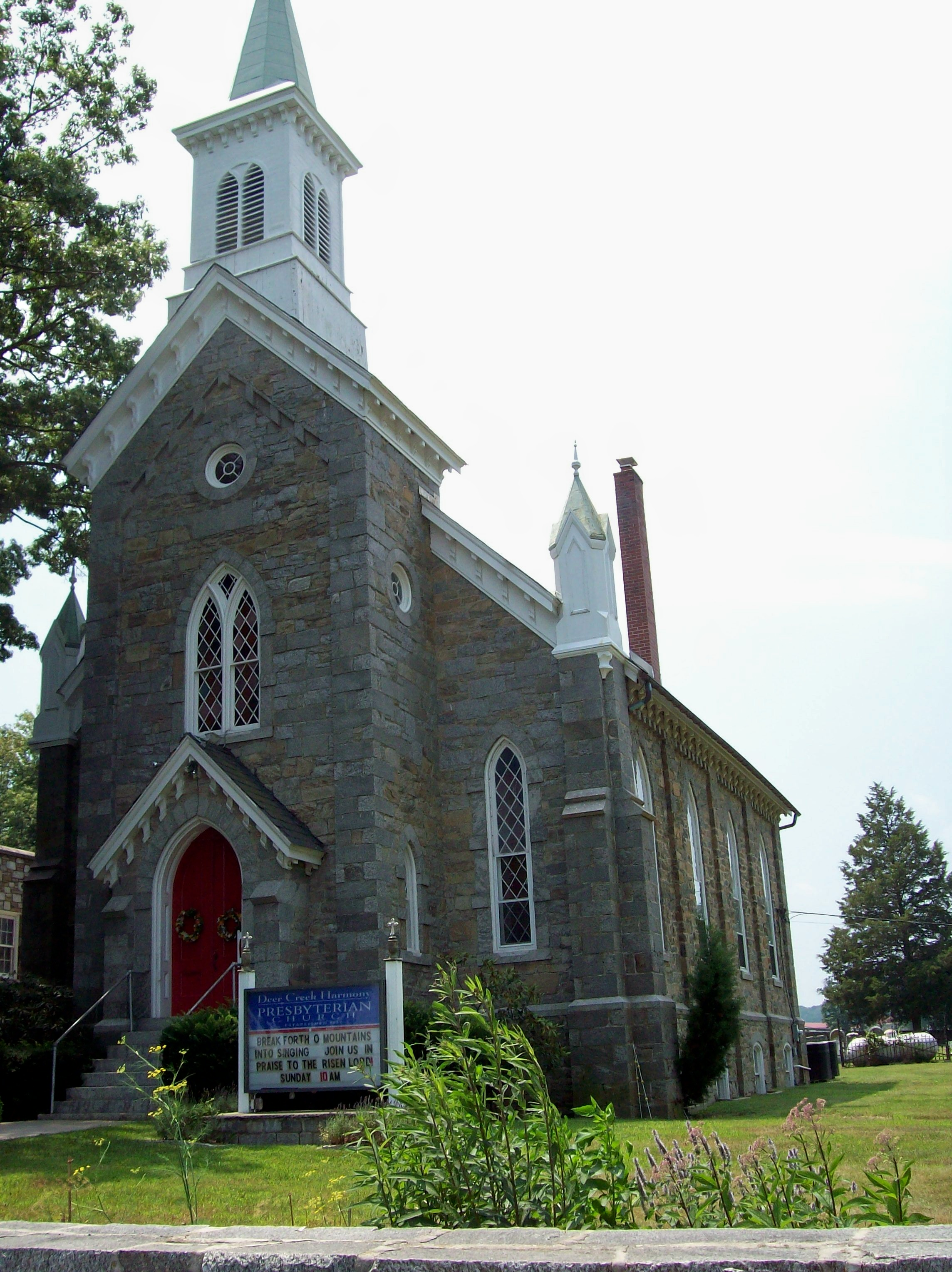
Harmony Presbyterian Church

- Deer Creek Harmony Presbyterian Church, 440 Darlington Road
- Benjamin Silver House and John A. Silver House Site, 3646 Harmony Church Road
- Jeremiah P. Silver House, "Lebanon," a.k.a. "Seven Springs Farm," 337 Fox Road
- Silas B. Silver House, "Silverton", 3643 Harmony Church Road
- William F. Silver House, "Shadowstone Farm", 521 Darlington Road

== See also ==
- Benjamin Silver
