= Berkley Crossroads Historic District =

Historic district in Maryland, United States

- U.S. National Register of Historic Places
- U.S. Historic district
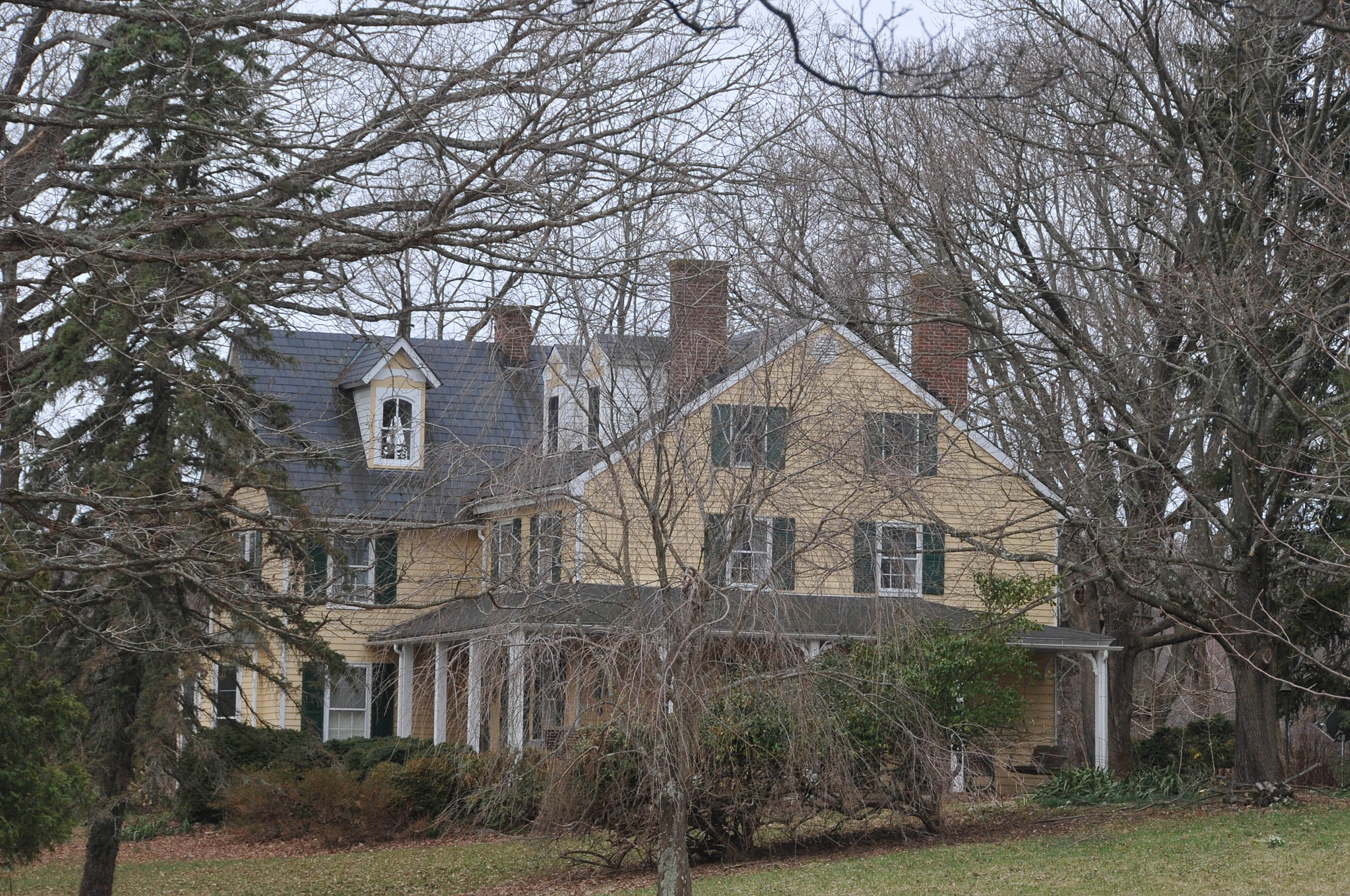

- Location within Maryland Location within the United States
- Location: Berkley Road and Castleton Rd., Darlington, Maryland
- Coordinates: 39°39′46″N 76°12′19″W
- Area: 150 acres (61 ha)
- Built: 1752
- Architect: Multiple, including Walter Cope
- Architectural style: Colonial, Early Republic
- NRHP reference No.: 03000649
- Added to NRHP: July 17, 2003

Berkley Crossroads Historic District is a historic district in Darlington, Maryland, United States. It is a small rural crossroads community dating from the late 18th century through the early 20th century, and is one of the few remaining rural crossroads in Harford County. The entire area is agricultural in nature, and mostly consists of two- and three-story residences. The earliest structures, dating from the late 18th and early 19th century are of log construction, in whole or in part. It was also an important 19th century Free Black community.

It was added to the National Register of Historic Places in 2003.
