= Deer Creek Friends Meetinghouse =

Historic church in Maryland, United States

- U.S. National Register of Historic Places
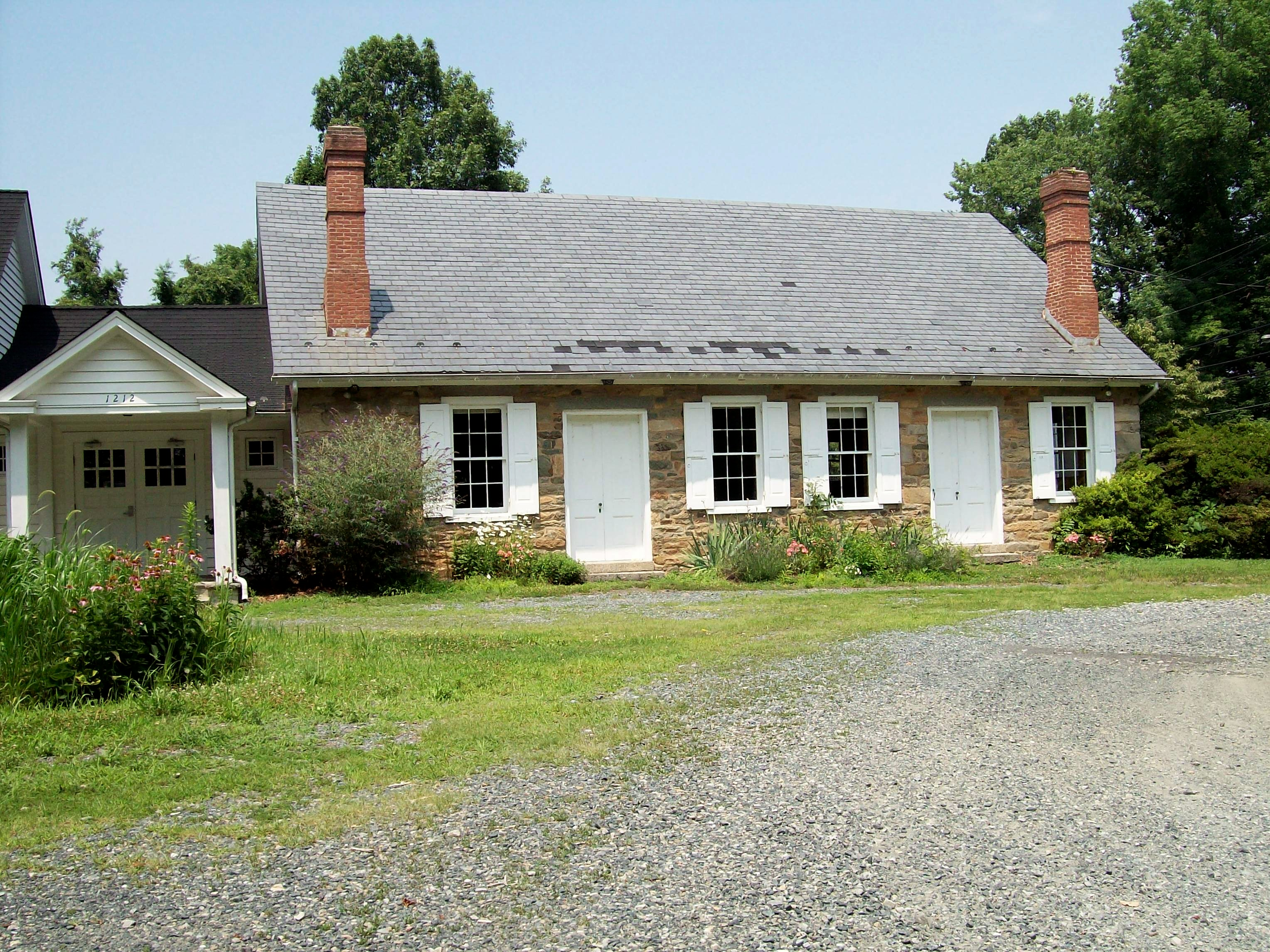
- Deer Creek Friends Meetinghouse, July 2011

- Location within Maryland Location within the United States
- Location: MD 161, Darlington, Maryland
- Coordinates: 39°38′46″N 76°12′19″W
- Area: 5 acres (2.0 ha)
- Built: 1784
- NRHP reference No.: 80001817
- Added to NRHP: April 23, 1980

Deer Creek Friends Meetinghouse is a historic Friends meeting house located at Darlington, Harford County, Maryland. It is a one-story fieldstone structure, six bays long on the south, four bays on the north, and three bays wide. It was constructed in 1784 to replace a building of 1737 and renovated in 1888. The interior is divided into two spaces by an original paneled partition and the benches are original, with 10 benches in each room and an aisle down the center. The property also includes a five-stall horse shed and a cemetery with burials dating from 1775 to 1930.

It was listed on the National Register of Historic Places in 1980.
