= Berkley, Maryland =

Unincorporated community in Maryland, U.S.

Coordinates: 39°39′41″N 76°12′32″W

Berkley is an unincorporated community in Harford County, Maryland, United States. Rigbie House was listed on the National Register of Historic Places in 1973.
