= Castleton, Maryland =

Unincorporated community in Maryland, United States

- Unincorporated community
- Location within Maryland Location within the United States
- Coordinates: 39°40′29″N 76°12′53″W
- Country: United States
- State: Maryland
- County: Harford
- Elevation: 256 ft (78 m)
- Time zone: UTC-5 (Eastern (EST))
  - Summer (DST): UTC-4 (EDT)
- Area codes: 410 & 443
- GNIS feature ID: 589912

Castleton is an unincorporated community in Harford County, Maryland, United States.
