= Michael D. Barnes =

American politician and United States Marine (born 1943)

Michael Barnes
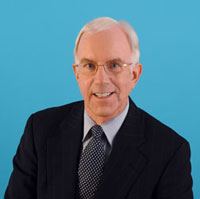

Member of the U.S. House of Representatives from Maryland's 8th district
- In office January 3, 1979 – January 3, 1987
- Preceded by: Newton Steers
- Succeeded by: Connie Morella

Personal details
- Born: Michael Darr Barnes; September 3, 1943 (age 83) Washington, D.C., U.S.
- Party: Democratic
- Spouses: Claudia Dillon Fangboner (m. 1970, divorced); Joan Pollitt (m. 2007)
- Children: 2
- Relatives: John P. Barnes (grandfather)
- Education: University of North Carolina, Chapel Hill (BA); Geneva Graduate Institute; George Washington University (JD)

Military service
- Allegiance: United States
- Branch: United States Marine Corps
- Service years: 1967–1969
- Rank: Corporal

Michael Darr Barnes (born September 3, 1943) is an American lawyer and politician who represented the eighth district of Maryland in the United States House of Representatives from 1979 to 1987.

== Early life ==
Born in Washington, D.C. to John P. Barnes former general counsel to C&P Telephone Company, and Vernon S. Barnes. His grandfather John P. Barnes was a judge on the U.S. District Court for the Northern District of Illinois. Barnes moved to Chevy Chase in Montgomery County, Maryland at age 13.

== Personal life ==
Barnes married Claudia Dillon Fangboner in 1970. He has two daughters, Dillon and Garrie.

== Career ==
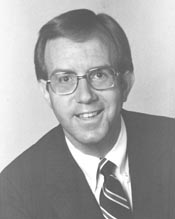
Barnes while in Congress.

After serving in the Marine Corps (1967 to 1969), being discharged with the rank of corporal, Barnes attended George Washington University and obtained a Juris Doctor degree in 1972. Barnes served on the Maryland Public Service Commission. Barnes served as executive director of the 1976 Democratic party platform committee. Barnes served in both private and government practice until his election to the House of Representatives as a Democrat in 1978.

=== Tenure in Congress ===
During the first session of the 99th Congress, he was the chairman of the Western Hemisphere Subcommittee of the House Foreign Affairs Committee. As a member of Congress, Barnes was generally an outspoken critic of Ronald Reagan's Central America policy, although he did in 1983 call the United States invasion of Grenada "justified," after a personal trip to the island. In 1986, Barnes lost the Democratic nomination for U.S. Senator from Maryland to Barbara Mikulski and retired to private legal practice.

=== Later career ===
Following his congressional service, Barnes was President of the Brady Center to Prevent Gun Violence, Chair of the Center for National Policy, Chair of the Governor's Commission on Growth in the Chesapeake Bay Region and a member of the Boards of Directors of the Metropolitan Washington Airports Authority, University of Maryland Foundation, Center for International Policy, Public Voice, and the Overseas Development Council. Prior to his service in Congress, Barnes was a Commissioner of the Maryland Public Service Commission from 1975 to 1979, and Vice Chairman of the Washington Metropolitan Area Transit Commission.

In July 1998, following the death of Maryland Comptroller Louis L. Goldstein, Governor Parris Glendening selected Barnes to fill the remainder of Goldstein's term as comptroller of Maryland. Barnes initially accepted and planned to run for a full four-year term in 1998, but withdrew his candidacy a few days later and endorsed former governor William Donald Schaefer in that year's election. As a result, Maryland deputy comptroller Robert L. Swann took over as comptroller.

From 2000 through 2006, he served as president of the Brady Campaign to Prevent Gun Violence. Barnes was Senior Of Counsel in the Washington, D.C., law firm of Covington & Burling. He retired as senior counsel at Covington & Burling LLP in December 2010.

Barnes joined the Board of Directors of the Washington Metropolitan Area Transit Authority from April 2011 to 2013 as Principal Director representing Montgomery County and the State of Maryland, preceded by Peter Benjamin and succeeded by Michael Goldman. He is a senior fellow at the Center for International Policy in Washington, DC. Barnes is also a member of the Inter-American Dialogue and the ReFormers Caucus of Issue One.

He was appointed by John Boehner to succeed Abner Mikva as an alternate member of the Office of Congressional Ethics on January 23, 2013.

== Education ==
Barnes attended the Landon School in Bethesda, Maryland. He graduated from Principia High School in St. Louis, Missouri in 1962. He earned his B.A. from the University of North Carolina at Chapel Hill in 1965, where he was a member of the Delta Upsilon fraternity. He attended the Geneva Graduate Institute in Switzerland from 1965 to 1966. He attained his J.D. from George Washington University in 1972.

== U.S. House election history ==
Maryland's 8th congressional district election, 1978
Party	Candidate	Votes	%
Democratic	Michael D. Barnes	81,851	51.27
Republican	Newton Steers (Incumbent)	77,807	48.73
Total votes		159,658	100.00
Democratic gain from Republican			

Maryland's 8th congressional district election, 1980
Party	Candidate	Votes	%
Democratic	Michael D. Barnes (Incumbent)	148,301	59.33
Republican	Newton Steers	101,659	40.67
Total votes		249,960	100.00
Democratic hold			

Maryland's 8th congressional district election, 1982
Party	Candidate	Votes	%
Democratic	Michael D. Barnes (Incumbent)	121,761	71.34
Republican	Elizabeth W. Spencer	48,910	28.66
Total votes		170,671	100.00
Democratic hold			

Maryland's 8th congressional district election, 1984
Party	Candidate	Votes	%
Democratic	Michael D. Barnes (Incumbent)	181,947	71.47
Republican	Albert Ceccone	70,715	27.78
Libertarian	Samuel K. Grove	1,903	0.75
Write-ins		4	<0.01
Total votes		254,569	100.00
Democratic hold			

U.S. House of Representatives
Preceded by Newton Steers	Member of the U.S. House of Representatives from Maryland's 8th congressional district 1979–1987	Succeeded by Connie Morella
U.S. order of precedence (ceremonial)
Preceded by Robert Bauman as Former U.S. Representative	Order of precedence of the United States as Former U.S. Representative	Succeeded by Donna Edwards as Former U.S. Representative
