= 1966 Maryland Comptroller election =

- November 8, 1966
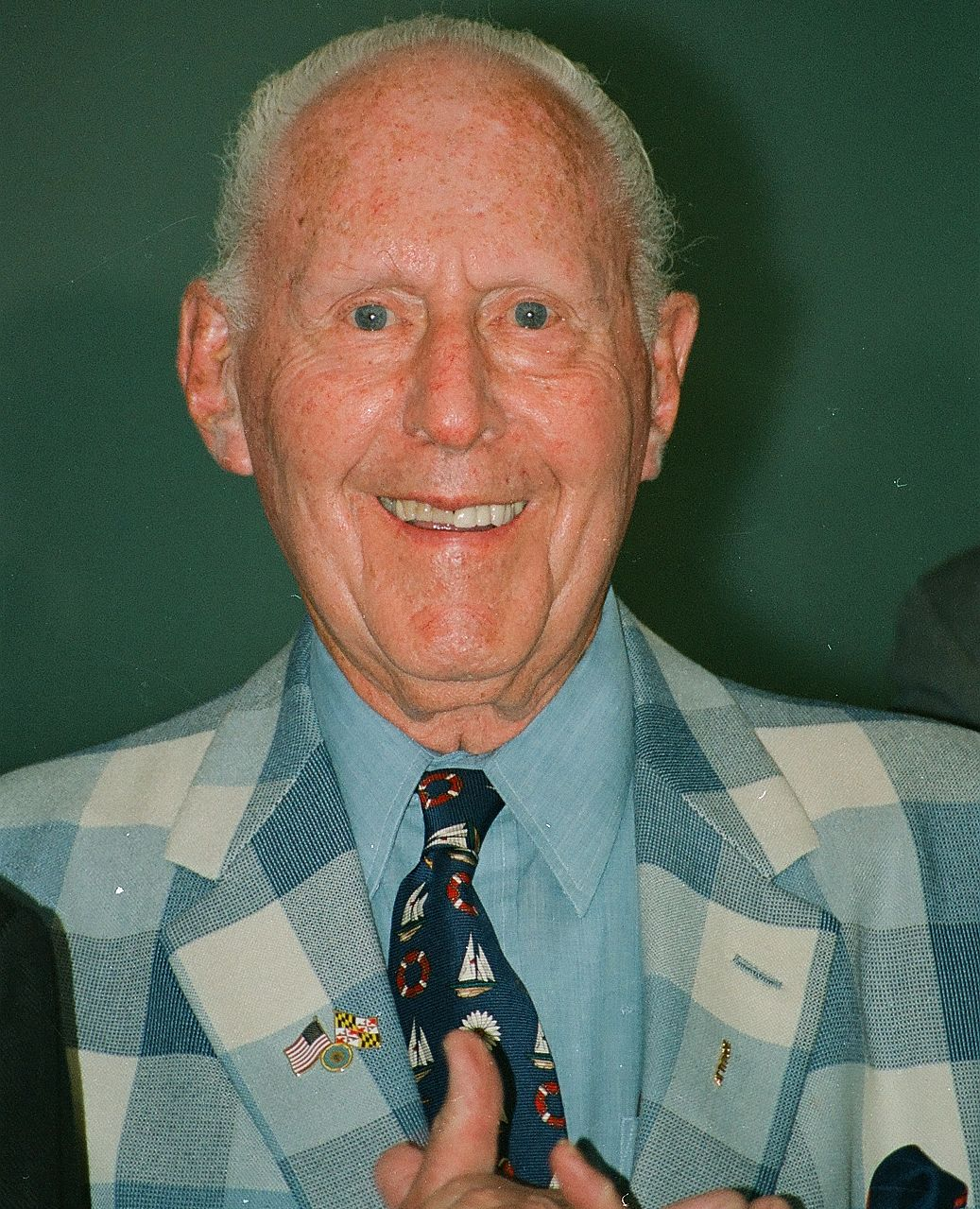

Nominee	Louis L. Goldstein	Charles S. Bresler
Party	Democratic	Republican
Popular vote	528,892	289,930
Percentage	64.59%	35.41%
- County results Goldstein: 50–60% 60–70% 70–80% Bresler: 50–60%
Comptroller before election
Louis L. Goldstein
Democratic
Elected Comptroller
Louis L. Goldstein
Democratic

The 1966 Maryland comptroller election was held on November 8, 1966, in order to elect the comptroller of Maryland. Democratic nominee and incumbent comptroller Louis L. Goldstein defeated Republican nominee Charles S. Bresler.

== General election ==
On election day, November 8, 1966, Democratic nominee Louis L. Goldstein won re-election by a margin of 238,962 votes against his opponent Republican nominee Charles S. Bresler, thereby retaining Democratic control over the office of comptroller. Goldstein was sworn in for his third term on January 3, 1967.

=== Results ===
Maryland Comptroller election, 1966
Party	Candidate	Votes	%
Democratic	Louis L. Goldstein (incumbent)	528,892	64.59
Republican	Charles S. Bresler	289,930	35.41
Total votes		818,822	100.00
Democratic hold			
