= 1938 Maryland Comptroller election =

- November 8, 1938
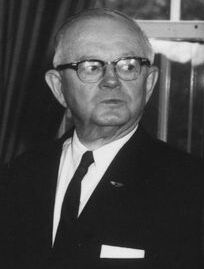

Nominee	J. Millard Tawes	William G. Jack
Party	Democratic	Republican
Popular vote	297,246	158,168
Percentage	64.11%	34.11%
- County results Tawes: 50–60% 60–70% 70–80% Jack: 50–60%
Comptroller before election
William S. Gordy Jr.
Democratic
Elected Comptroller
J. Millard Tawes
Democratic

The 1938 Maryland comptroller election was held on November 8, 1938, in order to elect the comptroller of Maryland. Democratic nominee J. Millard Tawes defeated Republican nominee William G. Jack, Union nominee James O. Harrison, Socialist nominee William T. Elder, Labor nominee Etta Gibson and Communist nominee Needham Horton.

== General election ==
On election day, November 8, 1938, Democratic nominee J. Millard Tawes won the election by a margin of 139,078 votes against his foremost opponent Republican nominee William G. Jack, thereby retaining Democratic control over the office of comptroller. Tawes was sworn in as the 27th comptroller of Maryland on January 3, 1939.

=== Results ===
Maryland Comptroller election, 1938
Party	Candidate	Votes	%
Democratic	J. Millard Tawes	297,246	64.11
Republican	William G. Jack	158,168	34.11
Union	James O. Harrison	4,255	0.92
Socialist	William T. Elder	1,536	0.33
Labor	Etta Gibson	1,503	0.32
Communist	Needham Horton	952	0.21
Write-in		4	0.00
Total votes		463,664	100.00
Democratic hold			
