= 1907 Maryland Comptroller election =

- November 5, 1907
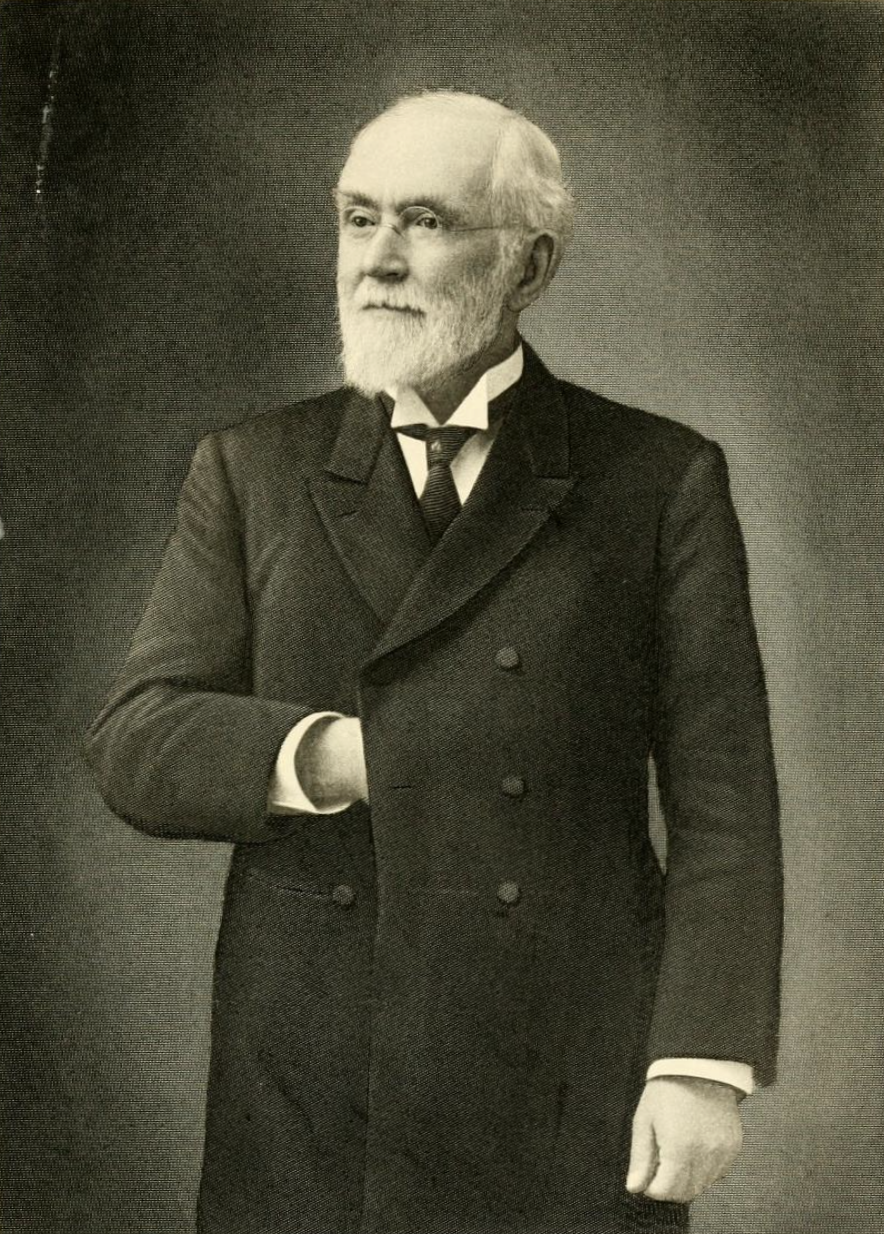

Nominee	Joshua W. Hering	James H. Baker
Party	Democratic	Republican
Popular vote	100,960	86,918
Percentage	52.11%	44.87%
- County results Hering: 40–50% 50–60% 60–70% Baker: 40–50% 50–60% 60–70%
Comptroller before election
Gordon T. Atkinson
Democratic
Elected Comptroller
Joshua W. Hering
Democratic

The 1907 Maryland comptroller election was held on November 5, 1907, in order to elect the comptroller of Maryland. Democratic nominee and former comptroller Joshua W. Hering defeated Republican nominee James H. Baker, Progressive nominee George A. Horner and Socialist nominee William H. Warfield.

== General election ==
On election day, November 5, 1907, Democratic nominee Joshua W. Hering won the election by a margin of 14,042 votes against his foremost opponent Republican nominee James H. Baker, thereby retaining Democratic control over the office of comptroller. Hering was sworn in for his third non-consecutive term on January 20, 1908.

=== Results ===
Maryland Comptroller election, 1907
Party	Candidate	Votes	%
Democratic	Joshua W. Hering	100,960	52.11
Republican	James H. Baker	86,918	44.87
Progressive	George A. Horner	4,035	2.08
Socialist	William H. Warfield	1,817	0.94
Total votes		193,730	100.00
Democratic hold			
