= 1899 Maryland Comptroller election =

- November 7, 1899
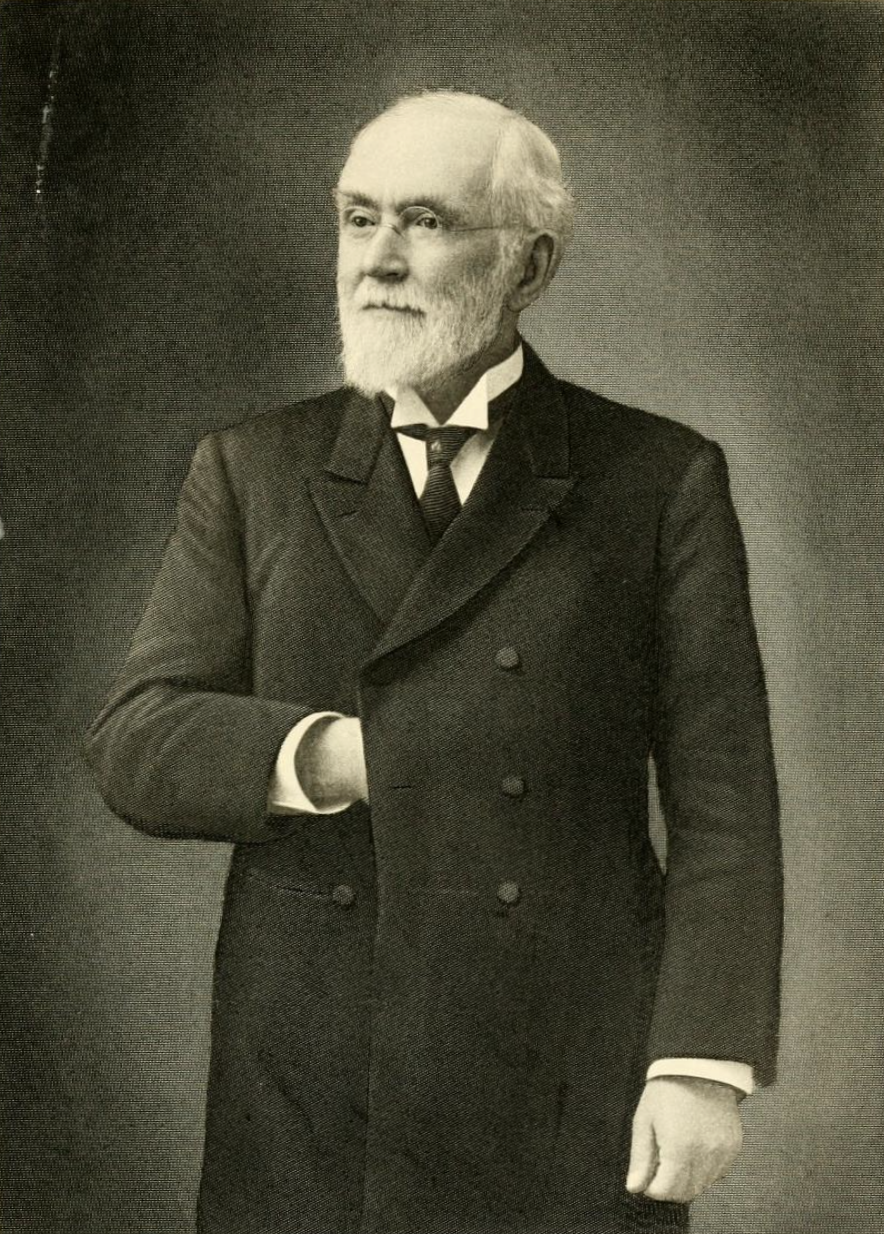

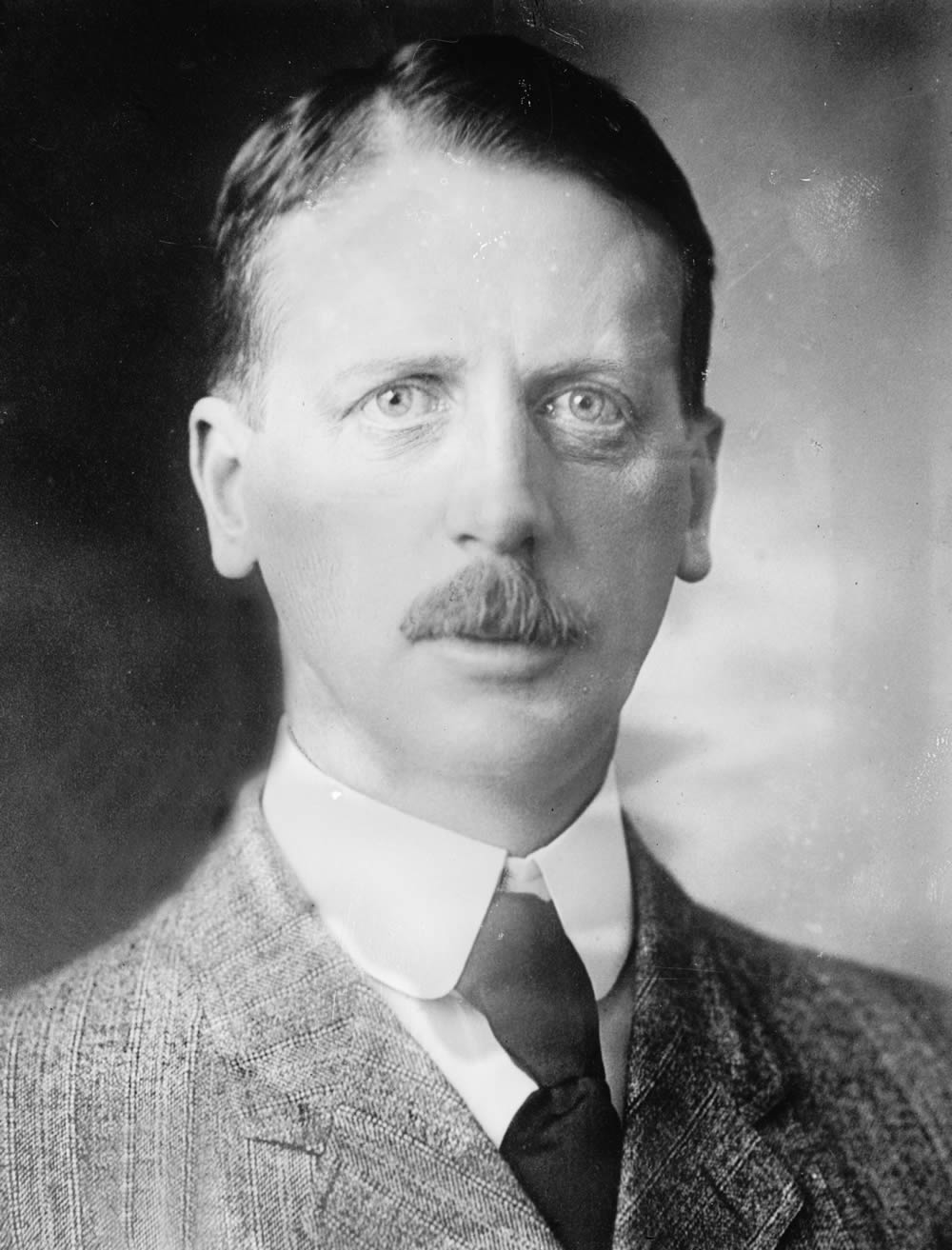
Nominee	Joshua W. Hering	Phillips Lee Goldsborough
Party	Democratic	Republican
Popular vote	127,604	116,043
Percentage	51.09%	46.46%
- County results Hering: 40–50% 50–60% Goldsborough: 40–50% 50–60% 60–70%
Comptroller before election
Phillips Lee Goldsborough
Republican
Elected Comptroller
Joshua W. Hering
Democratic

The 1899 Maryland comptroller election was held on November 7, 1899, in order to elect the comptroller of Maryland. Democratic nominee and incumbent member of the Maryland Senate Joshua W. Hering defeated Republican nominee and incumbent comptroller Phillips Lee Goldsborough, Prohibition nominee Phineas F. Ball, Social Democratic nominee Joseph C. Fowler and Union Reform nominee William E. George.

== General election ==
On election day, November 7, 1899, Democratic nominee Joshua W. Hering won the election by a margin of 11,561 votes against his foremost opponent Republican nominee Phillips Lee Goldsborough, thereby gaining Democratic control over the office of comptroller. Hering was sworn in as the 18th comptroller of Maryland on January 15, 1900.

=== Results ===
Maryland Comptroller election, 1899
Party	Candidate	Votes	%
Democratic	Joshua W. Hering	127,604	51.09
Republican	Phillips Lee Goldsborough (incumbent)	116,043	46.46
Prohibition	Phineas F. Ball	5,302	2.12
Social Democratic	Joseph C. Fowler	453	0.18
Union Reform	William E. George	368	0.15
Total votes		249,770	100.00
Democratic gain from Republican			
