= 1970 Maryland Comptroller election =

- November 3, 1970
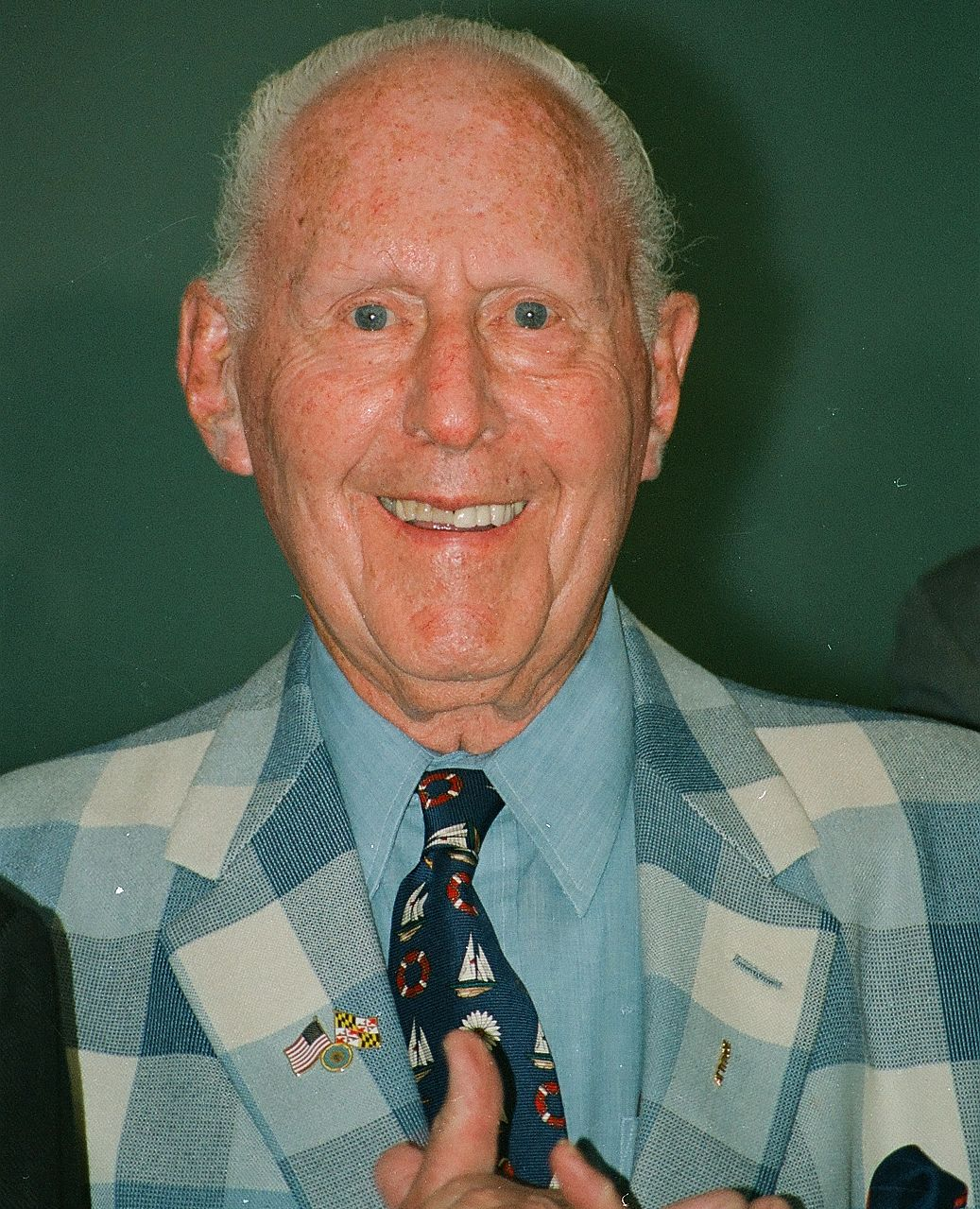

Nominee	Louis L. Goldstein	Harold Cross
Party	Democratic	Republican
Popular vote	608,112	265,259
Percentage	69.63%	30.37%
- County results Goldstein: 50–60% 60–70% 70–80% 80–90%
Comptroller before election
Louis L. Goldstein
Democratic
Elected Comptroller
Louis L. Goldstein
Democratic

The 1970 Maryland comptroller election was held on November 3, 1970, in order to elect the comptroller of Maryland. Democratic nominee and incumbent comptroller Louis L. Goldstein defeated Republican nominee Harold Cross.

== General election ==
On election day, November 3, 1970, Democratic nominee Louis L. Goldstein won re-election by a margin of 342,853 votes against his opponent Republican nominee Harold Cross, thereby retaining Democratic control over the office of comptroller. Goldstein was sworn in for his fourth term on January 3, 1971.

=== Results ===
Maryland Comptroller election, 1970
Party	Candidate	Votes	%
Democratic	Louis L. Goldstein (incumbent)	608,112	69.63
Republican	Harold Cross	265,259	30.37
Total votes		873,371	100.00
Democratic hold			
