= 1923 Maryland Comptroller election =

- November 6, 1923

Nominee	William S. Gordy Jr.	J. Monroe Holland
Party	Democratic	Republican
Popular vote	173,147	119,256
Percentage	58.20%	40.09%
- County results Gordy: 40–50% 50–60% 60–70% Holland: 40–50% 50–60% 60–70%
Comptroller before election
William S. Gordy Jr.
Democratic
Elected Comptroller
William S. Gordy Jr.
Democratic

The 1923 Maryland comptroller election was held on November 6, 1923, in order to elect the comptroller of Maryland. Democratic nominee and incumbent comptroller William S. Gordy Jr. defeated Republican nominee J. Monroe Holland, Socialist nominee James L. Smiley and Labor nominee Joseph Derner.

== General election ==
On election day, November 6, 1923, Democratic nominee William S. Gordy Jr. won re-election by a margin of 53,891 votes against his foremost opponent Republican nominee J. Monroe Holland, thereby retaining Democratic control over the office of comptroller. Gordy was sworn in for his second term on January 21, 1924.

=== Results ===
Maryland Comptroller election, 1923
Party	Candidate	Votes	%
Democratic	William S. Gordy Jr. (incumbent)	173,147	58.20
Republican	J. Monroe Holland	119,256	40.09
Socialist	James L. Smiley	2,621	0.88
Labor	Joseph Derner	2,478	0.83
Total votes		297,502	100.00
Democratic hold			
