= 1994 Maryland Comptroller election =

- November 8, 1994
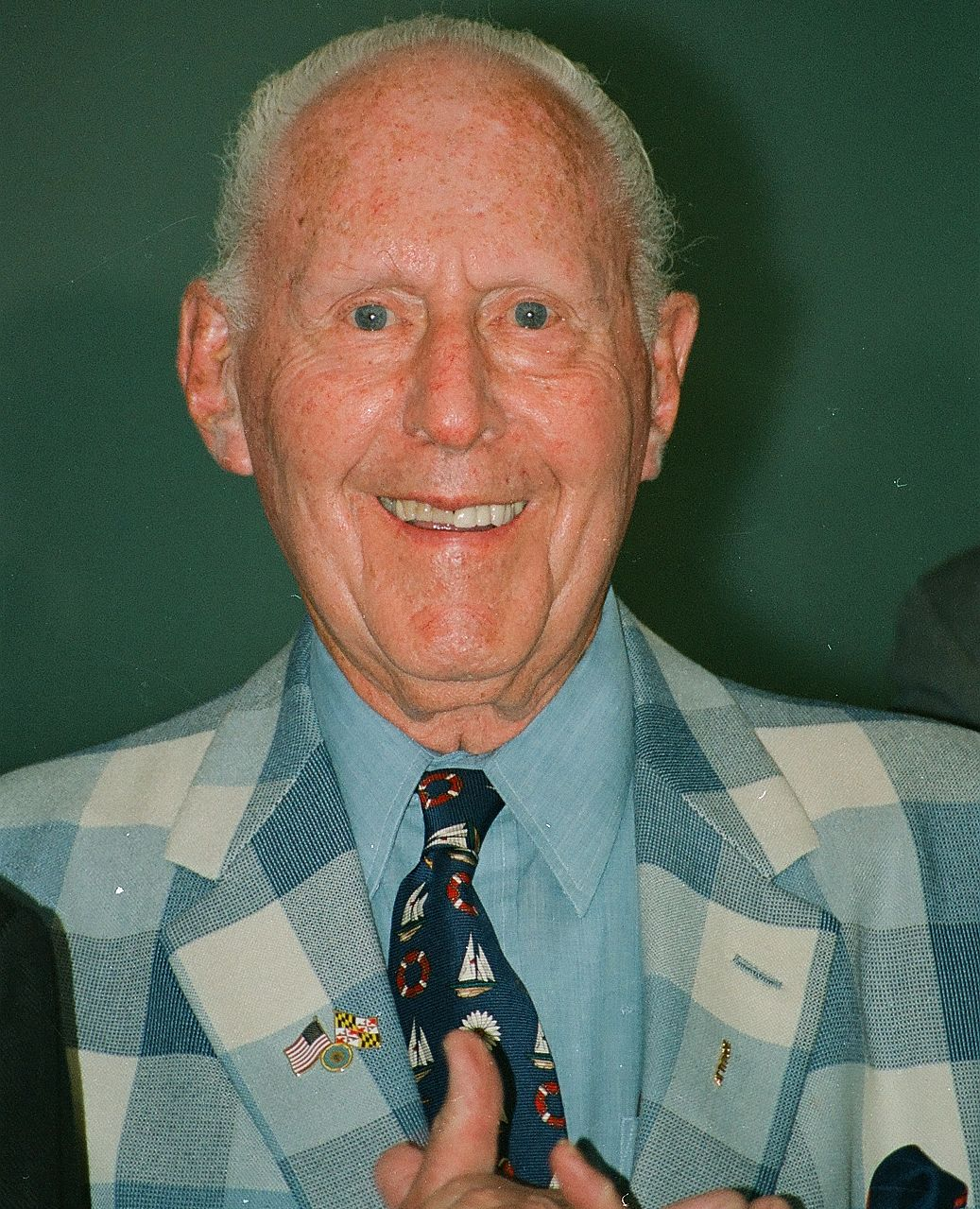

Nominee	Louis L. Goldstein	Timothy R. Mayberry
Party	Democratic	Republican
Popular vote	809,852	516,631
Percentage	61.05%	38.95%
- County results Goldstein: 50–60% 60–70% 70–80% 80–90% Mayberry: 50–60%
Comptroller before election
Louis L. Goldstein
Democratic
Elected Comptroller
Louis L. Goldstein
Democratic

The 1994 Maryland comptroller election was held on November 8, 1994, in order to elect the comptroller of Maryland. Democratic nominee and incumbent comptroller Louis L. Goldstein defeated Republican nominee Timothy R. Mayberry.

== General election ==
On election day, November 8, 1994, Democratic nominee Louis L. Goldstein won re-election by a margin of 293,221 votes against his opponent Republican nominee Timothy R. Mayberry, thereby retaining Democratic control over the office of comptroller. Goldstein was sworn in for his tenth term on January 3, 1995.

=== Results ===
Maryland Comptroller election, 1994
Party	Candidate	Votes	%
Democratic	Louis L. Goldstein (incumbent)	809,852	61.05
Republican	Timothy R. Mayberry	516,631	38.95
Total votes		1,326,483	100.00
Democratic hold			
