= 1982 Maryland Comptroller election =

- November 2, 1982
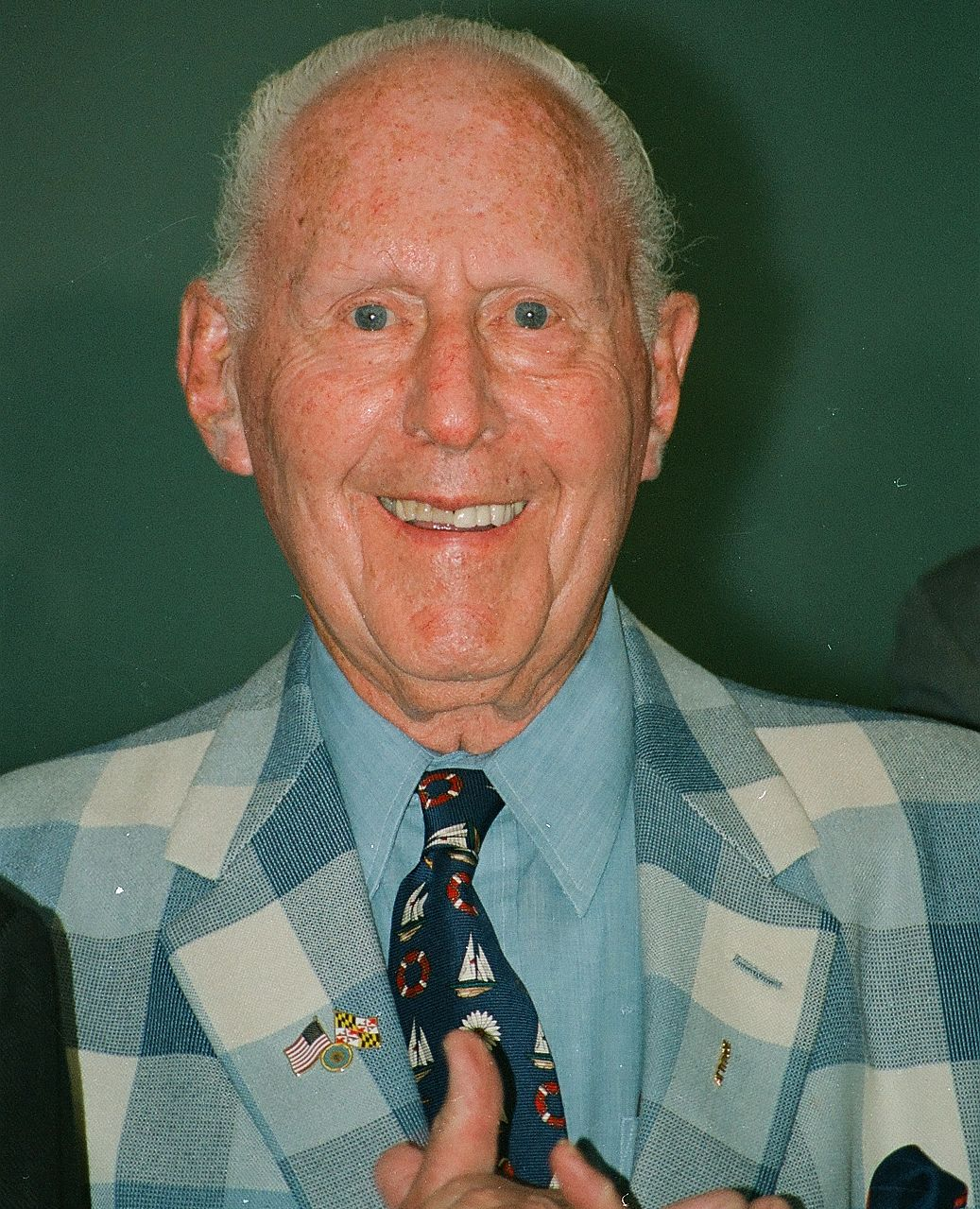

Nominee	Louis L. Goldstein	Richard L. Andrews
Party	Democratic	Republican
Popular vote	823,902	220,561
Percentage	78.88%	21.12%
- County results Goldstein: 60–70% 70–80% 80–90%
Comptroller before election
Louis L. Goldstein
Democratic
Elected Comptroller
Louis L. Goldstein
Democratic

The 1982 Maryland comptroller election was held on November 2, 1982, in order to elect the comptroller of Maryland. Democratic nominee and incumbent comptroller Louis L. Goldstein defeated Republican nominee Richard L. Andrews.

== General election ==
On election day, November 2, 1982, Democratic nominee Louis L. Goldstein won re-election by a margin of 603,341 votes against his opponent Republican nominee Richard L. Andrews, thereby retaining Democratic control over the office of comptroller. Goldstein was sworn in for his seventh term on January 3, 1983.

=== Results ===
Maryland Comptroller election, 1982
Party	Candidate	Votes	%
Democratic	Louis L. Goldstein (incumbent)	823,902	78.88
Republican	Richard L. Andrews	220,561	21.12
Total votes		1,044,463	100.00
Democratic hold			
