= 1930 Maryland Comptroller election =

- November 4, 1930

Nominee	William S. Gordy Jr.	W. Newton Jackson
Party	Democratic	Republican
Popular vote	264,284	184,146
Percentage	57.97%	40.39%
- County results Gordy: 40–50% 50–60% 60–70% 90–100% Jackson: 40–50% 50–60% 60–70%
Comptroller before election
William S. Gordy Jr.
Democratic
Elected Comptroller
William S. Gordy Jr.
Democratic

The 1930 Maryland comptroller election was held on November 4, 1930, in order to elect the comptroller of Maryland. Democratic nominee and incumbent comptroller William S. Gordy Jr. defeated Republican nominee W. Newton Jackson, Socialist nominee Charles L. Myers, Labor nominee Samuel Einhorn and Communist nominee Lena Lipman.

== General election ==
On election day, November 4, 1930, Democratic nominee William S. Gordy Jr. won re-election by a margin of 80,138 votes against his foremost opponent Republican nominee W. Newton Jackson, thereby retaining Democratic control over the office of comptroller. Gordy was sworn in for his fourth term on January 3, 1931.

=== Results ===
Maryland Comptroller election, 1930
Party	Candidate	Votes	%
Democratic	William S. Gordy Jr. (incumbent)	264,284	57.97
Republican	W. Newton Jackson	184,146	40.39
Socialist	Charles L. Myers	3,227	0.71
Labor	Samuel Einhorn	3,223	0.71
Communist	Lena Lipman	995	0.22
Total votes		455,875	100.00
Democratic hold			
