= 1915 Maryland Comptroller election =

- November 2, 1915

Nominee	Hugh A. McMullen	Robert F. Duer
Party	Democratic	Republican
Popular vote	114,951	108,353
Percentage	50.20%	47.32%
- County results McMullen: 40–50% 50–60% Duer: 40–50% 50–60% 60–70%
Comptroller before election
Emerson Harrington
Democratic
Elected Comptroller
Hugh A. McMullen
Democratic

The 1915 Maryland comptroller election was held on November 2, 1915, in order to elect the comptroller of Maryland. Democratic nominee Hugh A. McMullen defeated Republican nominee Robert F. Duer, Prohibition nominee Thomas E. Watkins, Socialist nominee Julius V. Porstman and Labor nominee Israel Merwitz.

== General election ==
On election day, November 2, 1915, Democratic nominee Hugh A. McMullen won the election by a margin of 6,598 votes against his foremost opponent Republican nominee Robert F. Duer, thereby retaining Democratic control over the office of comptroller. McMullen was sworn in as the 24th comptroller of Maryland on January 3, 1916.

=== Results ===
Maryland Comptroller election, 1915
Party	Candidate	Votes	%
Democratic	Hugh A. McMullen	114,951	50.20
Republican	Robert F. Duer	108,353	47.32
Prohibition	Thomas E. Watkins	2,943	1.28
Socialist	Julius V. Porstman	2,007	0.88
Labor	Israel Merwitz	729	0.32
Total votes		228,983	100.00
Democratic hold			
