= 1934 Maryland Comptroller election =

- November 6, 1934

| Nominee | William S. Gordy Jr. | Frederic Paul Adkins |
| Party | Democratic | Republican |
| Popular vote | 256,335 | 188,777 |
| Percentage | 56.47% | 41.58% |
- County results Gordy: 40–50% 50–60% 60–70% Adkins: 40–50% 50–60% 60–70%
Comptroller before election
William S. Gordy Jr.
Democratic
Elected Comptroller
William S. Gordy Jr.
Democratic

The 1934 Maryland comptroller election was held on November 6, 1934, in order to elect the comptroller of Maryland. Democratic nominee and incumbent comptroller William S. Gordy Jr. defeated Republican nominee Frederic Paul Adkins, Socialist nominee Lee H. Lacey, Labor nominee Morris Levitt and Communist nominee Roy Howell.

== General election ==
On election day, November 6, 1934, Democratic nominee William S. Gordy Jr. won re-election by a margin of 67,558 votes against his foremost opponent Republican nominee Frederic Paul Adkins, thereby retaining Democratic control over the office of comptroller. Gordy was sworn in for his fifth term on January 3, 1935.

=== Results ===
Maryland Comptroller election, 1934
| Party | Candidate | Votes | % |
|---|---|---|---|
| Democratic | William S. Gordy Jr. (incumbent) | 256,335 | 56.47 |
| Republican | Frederic Paul Adkins | 188,777 | 41.58 |
| Socialist | Lee H. Lacey | 5,522 | 1.22 |
| Labor | Morris Levitt | 2,199 | 0.48 |
| Communist | Roy Howell | 1,140 | 0.25 |
| Total votes | | 453,973 | 100.00 |
| Democratic hold | | | |
