= 1974 Maryland Comptroller election =

- November 5, 1974
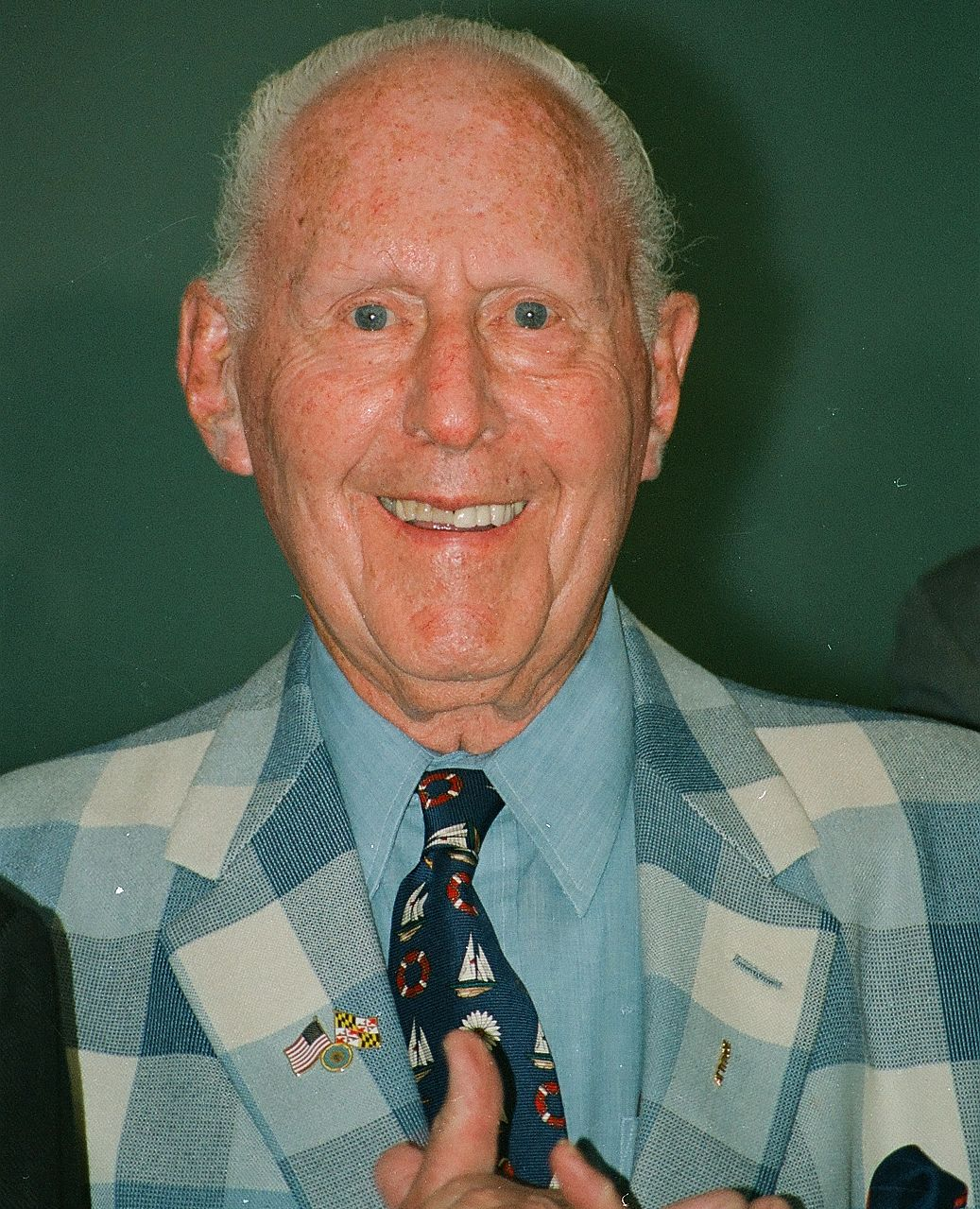
Nominee	Louis L. Goldstein
Party	Democratic
Popular vote	614,656
Percentage	100.00%
- County results Goldstein: 90–100%
Comptroller before election
Louis L. Goldstein
Democratic
Elected Comptroller
Louis L. Goldstein
Democratic

The 1974 Maryland comptroller election was held on November 5, 1974, in order to elect the comptroller of Maryland. Democratic nominee and incumbent comptroller Louis L. Goldstein won re-election as he ran unopposed.

== General election ==
On election day, November 5, 1974, Democratic nominee Louis L. Goldstein won re-election as he ran unopposed, thereby retaining Democratic control over the office of comptroller. Goldstein was sworn in for his fifth term on January 3, 1975.

=== Results ===
Maryland Comptroller election, 1974
Party	Candidate	Votes	%
Democratic	Louis L. Goldstein (incumbent)	614,656	100.00
Total votes		614,656	100.00
Democratic hold			
