= 1917 Maryland Comptroller election =

- November 6, 1917

Nominee	Hugh A. McMullen	William O. Atwood
Party	Democratic	Republican
Popular vote	85,368	84,499
Percentage	48.02%	47.53%
- County results McMullen: 40–50% 50–60% 60–70% Atwood: 40–50% 50–60% 60–70%
Comptroller before election
Hugh A. McMullen
Democratic
Elected Comptroller
Hugh A. McMullen
Democratic

The 1917 Maryland comptroller election was held on November 6, 1917, in order to elect the comptroller of Maryland. Democratic nominee and incumbent comptroller Hugh A. McMullen defeated Republican nominee William O. Atwood, Socialist nominee William A. Toole, Prohibition nominee William Magee and Labor nominee Robert W. Stevens.

== General election ==
On election day, November 6, 1917, Democratic nominee Hugh A. McMullen won re-election by a margin of 869 votes against his foremost opponent Republican nominee William O. Atwood, thereby retaining Democratic control over the office of comptroller. McMullen was sworn in for his second term on January 3, 1918.

=== Results ===
Maryland Comptroller election, 1917
Party	Candidate	Votes	%
Democratic	Hugh A. McMullen (incumbent)	85,368	48.02
Republican	William O. Atwood	84,499	47.53
Socialist	William A. Toole	4,330	2.44
Prohibition	William Magee	2,621	1.47
Labor	Robert W. Stevens	971	0.54
Total votes		177,789	100.00
Democratic hold			
