= 1921 Maryland Comptroller election =

- November 8, 1921

Nominee	William S. Gordy Jr.	Oliver Metzerott
Party	Democratic	Republican
Popular vote	155,873	131,280
Percentage	52.17%	43.94%
- County results Gordy: 40–50% 50–60% 60–70% Metzerott: 40–50% 50–60% 60–70%
Comptroller before election
E. Brooke Lee
Democratic
Elected Comptroller
William S. Gordy Jr.
Democratic

The 1921 Maryland comptroller election was held on November 8, 1921, in order to elect the comptroller of Maryland. Democratic nominee William S. Gordy Jr. defeated Republican nominee Oliver Metzerott, Labor nominee Robert L. Long and Socialist nominee Clarence H. Taylor.

== General election ==
On election day, November 8, 1921, Democratic nominee William S. Gordy Jr. won the election by a margin of 24,593 votes against his foremost opponent Republican nominee Oliver Metzerott, thereby retaining Democratic control over the office of comptroller. Gordy was sworn in as the 26th comptroller of Maryland on January 16, 1922.

=== Results ===
Maryland Comptroller election, 1921
Party	Candidate	Votes	%
Democratic	William S. Gordy Jr.	155,873	52.17
Republican	Oliver Metzerott	131,280	43.94
Labor	Robert L. Long	6,790	2.27
Socialist	Clarence H. Taylor	4,825	1.62
Total votes		298,768	100.00
Democratic hold			
