= 1958 Maryland Comptroller election =

- November 4, 1958
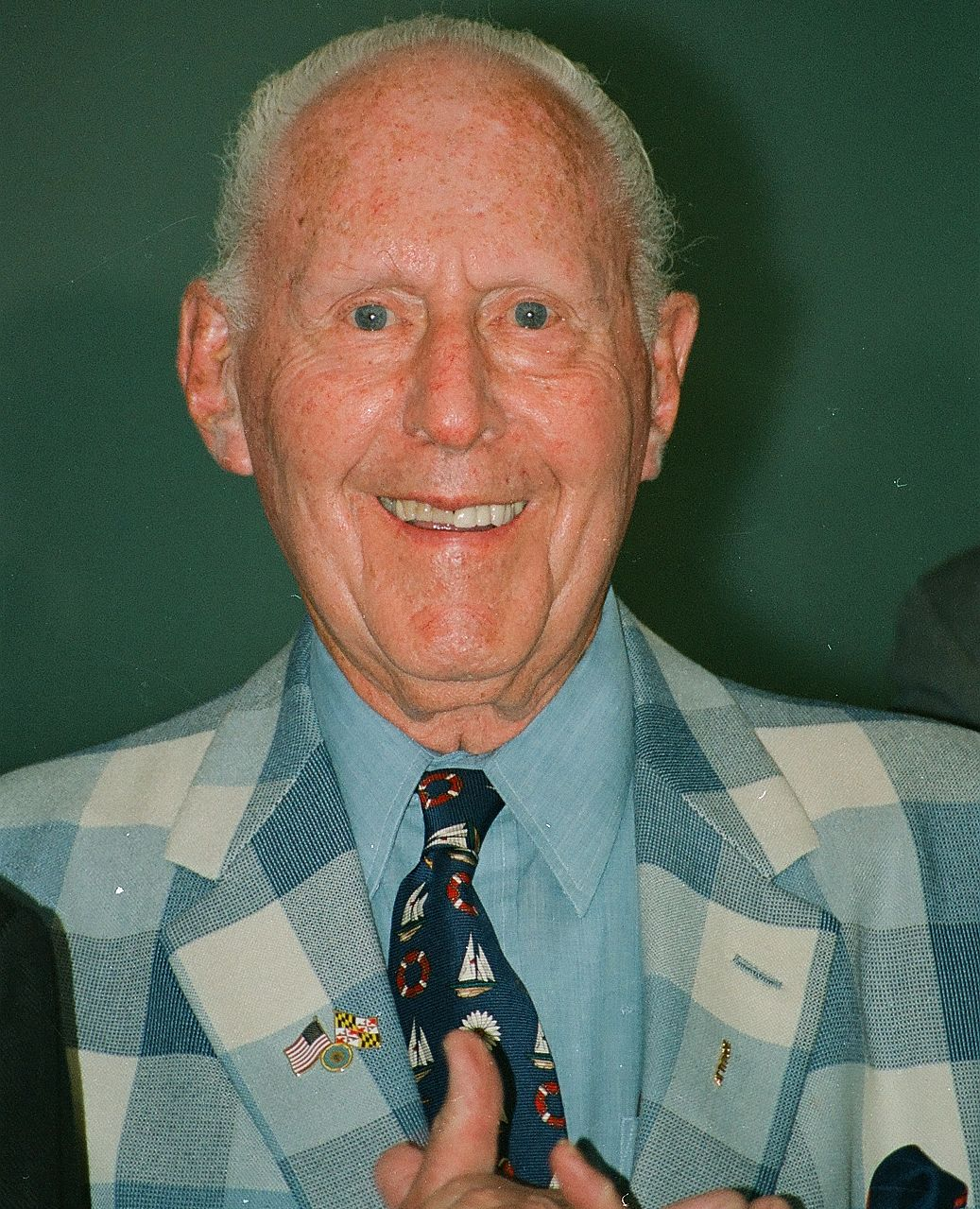

Nominee	Louis L. Goldstein	John A. Derr
Party	Democratic	Republican
Popular vote	421,869	277,183
Percentage	60.35%	39.65%
- County results Goldstein: 50–60% 60–70% 70–80% Derr: 50–60%
Comptroller before election
J. Millard Tawes
Democratic
Elected Comptroller
Louis L. Goldstein
Democratic

The 1958 Maryland comptroller election was held on November 4, 1958, in order to elect the comptroller of Maryland. Democratic nominee and incumbent President of the Maryland Senate Louis L. Goldstein defeated Republican nominee John A. Derr.

== General election ==
On election day, November 4, 1958, Democratic nominee Louis L. Goldstein won the election by a margin of 144,686 votes against his opponent Republican nominee John A. Derr, thereby retaining Democratic control over the office of comptroller. Goldstein was sworn in as the 30th comptroller of Maryland on January 3, 1959.

=== Results ===
Maryland Comptroller election, 1958
Party	Candidate	Votes	%
Democratic	Louis L. Goldstein	421,869	60.35
Republican	John A. Derr	277,183	39.65
Total votes		699,052	100.00
Democratic hold			
