= 1962 Maryland Comptroller election =

- November 6, 1962
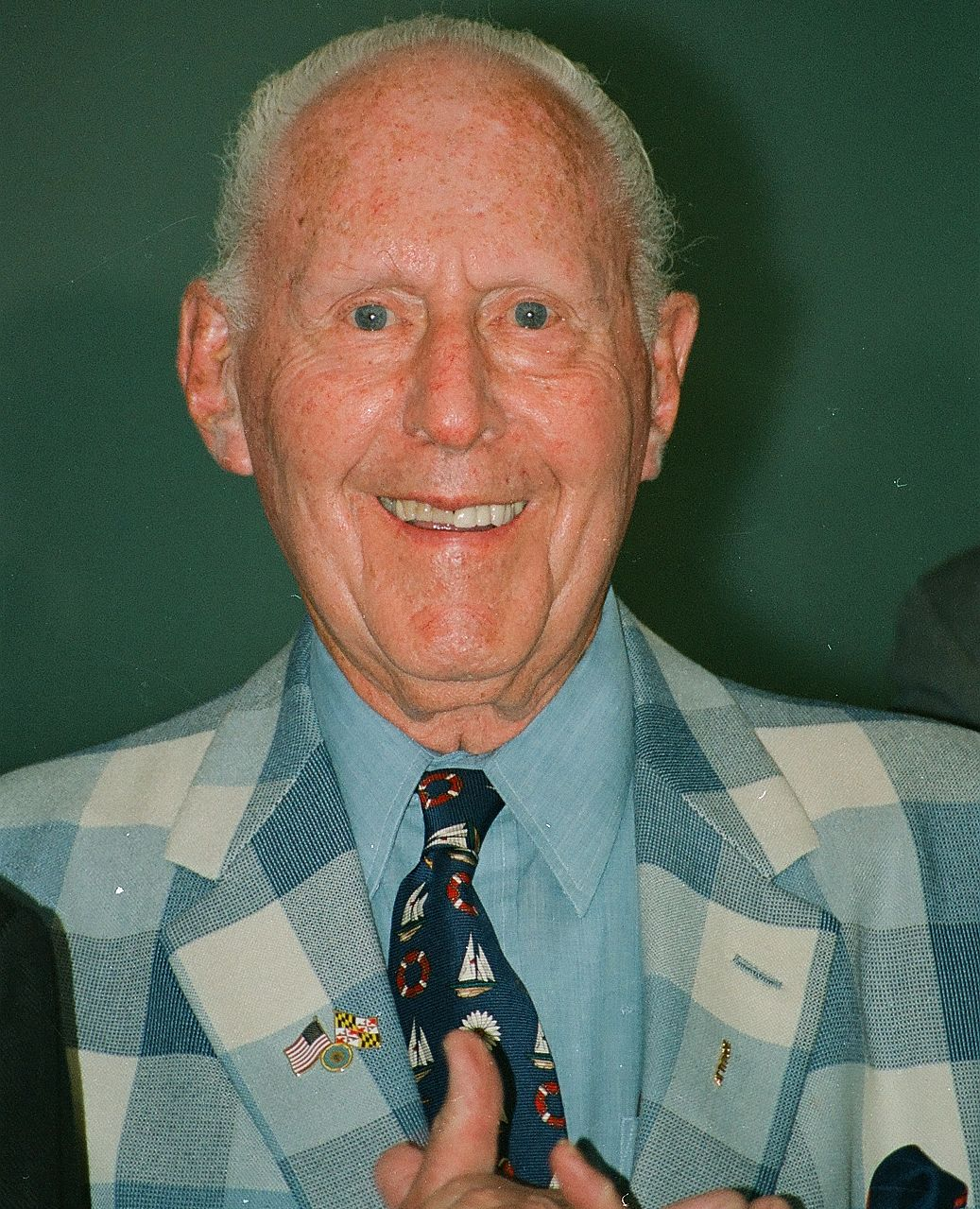

| Nominee | Louis L. Goldstein | David C. Champion |
| Party | Democratic | Republican |
| Popular vote | 434,972 | 258,138 |
| Percentage | 62.76% | 37.24% |
- County results Goldstein: 50–60% 60–70% 70–80% Champion: 50–60%
Comptroller before election
Louis L. Goldstein
Democratic
Elected Comptroller
Louis L. Goldstein
Democratic

The 1962 Maryland comptroller election was held on November 6, 1962, in order to elect the comptroller of Maryland. Democratic nominee and incumbent comptroller Louis L. Goldstein defeated Republican nominee David C. Champion.

== General election ==
On election day, November 6, 1962, Democratic nominee Louis L. Goldstein won re-election by a margin of 176,834 votes against his opponent Republican nominee David C. Champion, thereby retaining Democratic control over the office of comptroller. Goldstein was sworn in for his second term on January 3, 1963.

=== Results ===
Maryland Comptroller election, 1962
| Party | Candidate | Votes | % |
|---|---|---|---|
| Democratic | Louis L. Goldstein (incumbent) | 434,972 | 62.76 |
| Republican | David C. Champion | 258,138 | 37.24 |
| Total votes | | 693,110 | 100.00 |
| Democratic hold | | | |
