= 1901 Maryland Comptroller election =

- November 7, 1901
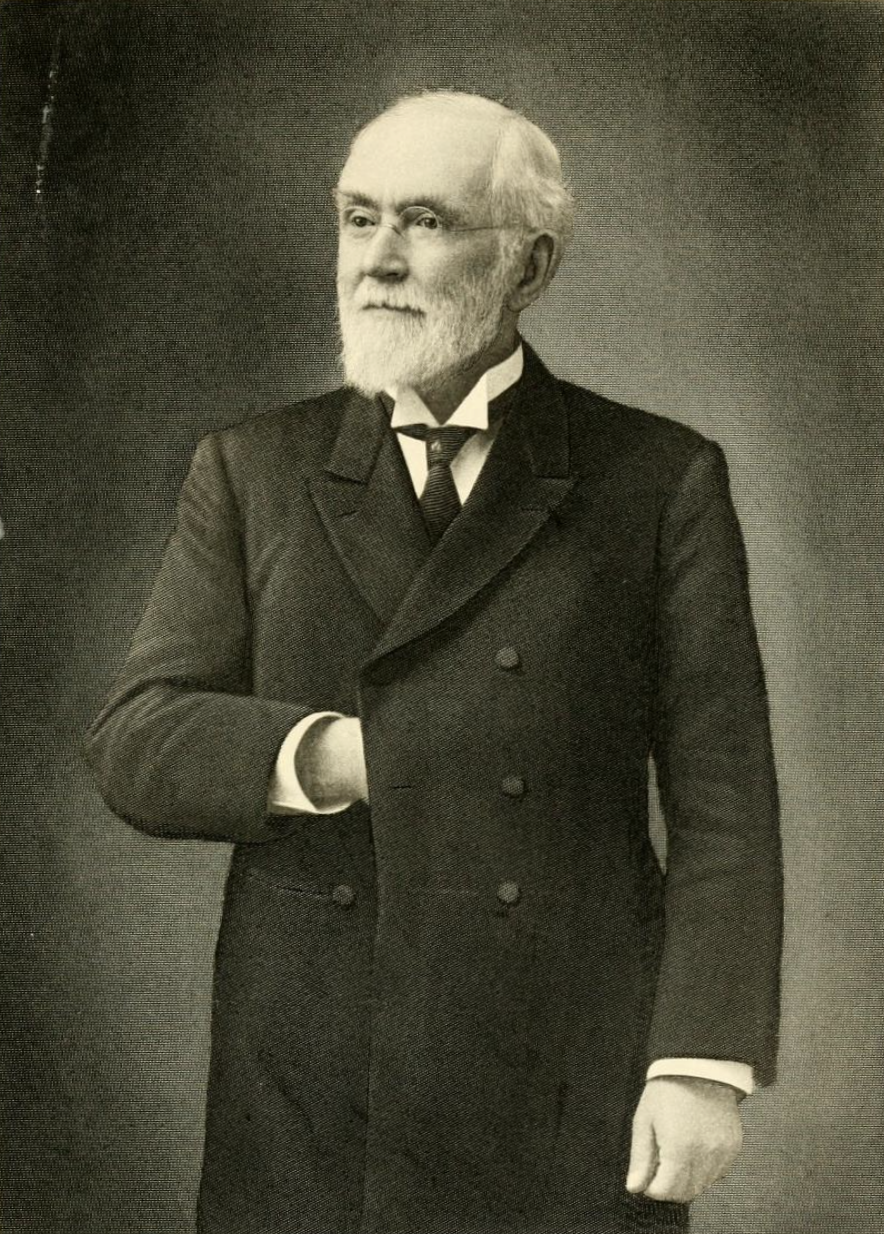

Nominee	Joshua W. Hering	Herman S. Platt
Party	Democratic	Republican
Popular vote	96,477	96,356
Percentage	48.91%	48.85%
- County results Hering: 40–50% 50–60% 60–70% Platt: 50–60% 60–70%
Comptroller before election
Joshua W. Hering
Democratic
Elected Comptroller
Joshua W. Hering
Democratic

The 1901 Maryland comptroller election was held on November 7, 1901, in order to elect the comptroller of Maryland. Democratic nominee and incumbent comptroller Joshua W. Hering defeated Republican nominee Herman S. Platt, Prohibition nominee William Kleinle and Independent candidate William J. Parker.

== General election ==
On election day, November 7, 1901, Democratic nominee Joshua W. Hering won re-election by a margin of 121 votes against his foremost opponent Republican nominee Herman S. Platt, thereby retaining Democratic control over the office of comptroller. Hering was sworn in for his second term on January 20, 1902.

=== Results ===
Maryland Comptroller election, 1901
Party	Candidate	Votes	%
Democratic	Joshua W. Hering (incumbent)	96,477	48.91
Republican	Herman S. Platt	96,356	48.85
Prohibition	William Kleinle	3,740	1.90
Independent	William J. Parker	674	0.34
Total votes		197,247	100.00
Democratic hold			
