= 1986 Maryland Comptroller election =

- November 4, 1986
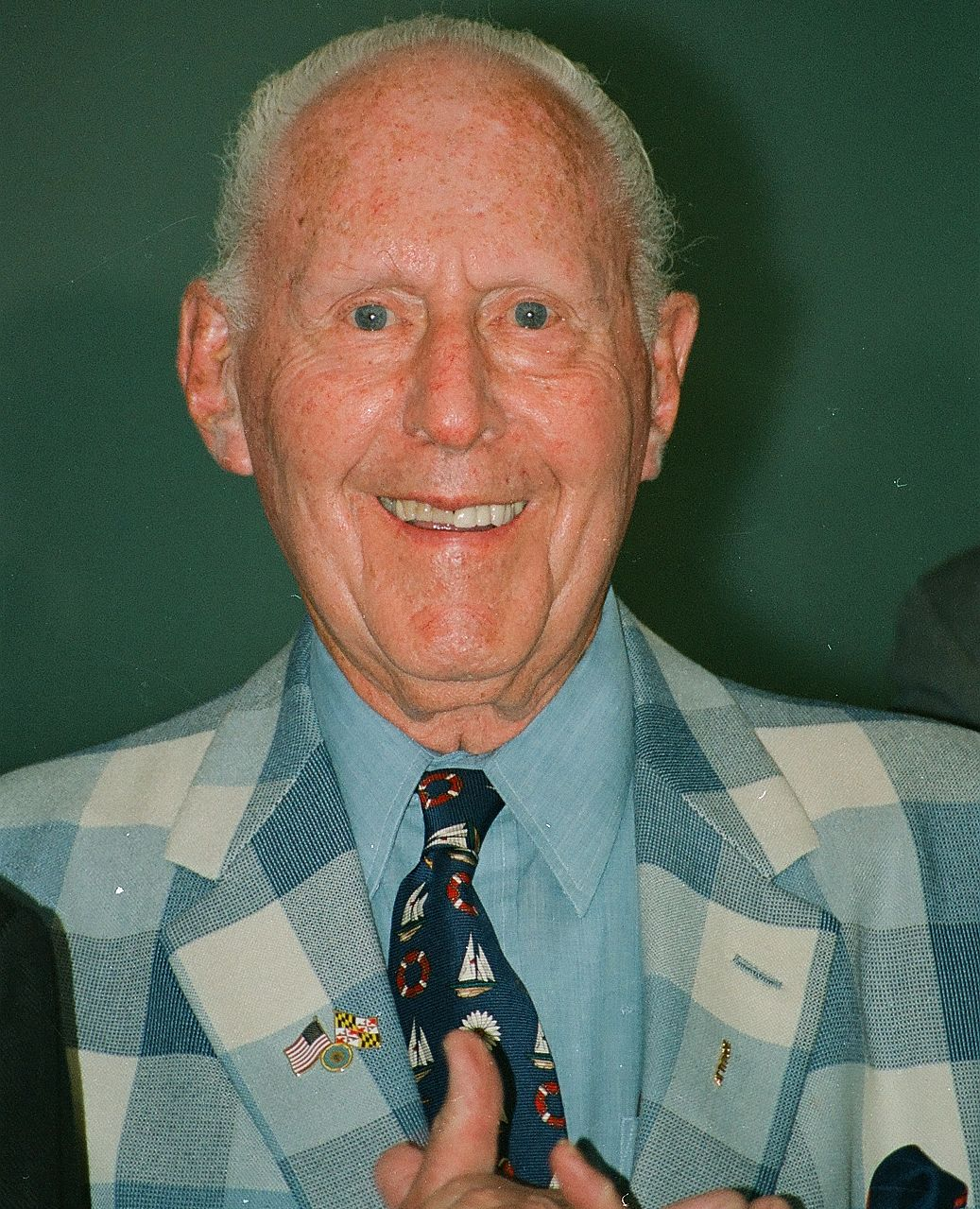
Nominee	Louis L. Goldstein
Party	Democratic
Popular vote	854,315
Percentage	100.00%
- County results Goldstein: 90–100%
Comptroller before election
Louis L. Goldstein
Democratic
Elected Comptroller
Louis L. Goldstein
Democratic

The 1986 Maryland comptroller election was held on November 4, 1986, in order to elect the comptroller of Maryland. Democratic nominee and incumbent comptroller Louis L. Goldstein won re-election as he ran unopposed.

== General election ==
On election day, November 4, 1986, Democratic nominee Louis L. Goldstein won re-election as he ran unopposed, thereby retaining Democratic control over the office of comptroller. Goldstein was sworn in for his eighth term on January 3, 1987.

=== Results ===
Maryland Comptroller election, 1986
Party	Candidate	Votes	%
Democratic	Louis L. Goldstein (incumbent)	854,315	100.00
Total votes		1,044,463	100.00
Democratic hold			
