= 1990 Maryland Comptroller election =

- November 6, 1990
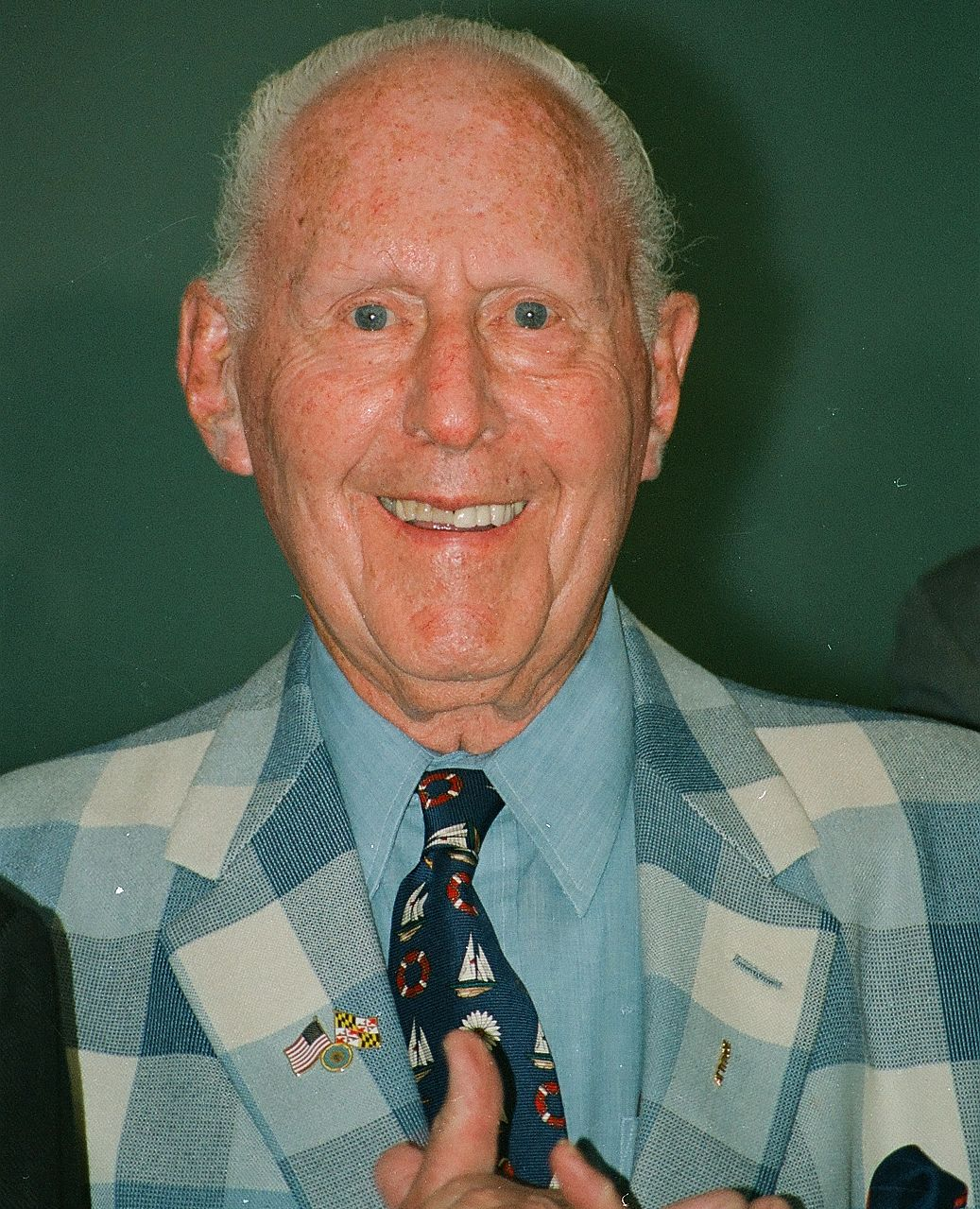

Nominee	Louis L. Goldstein	Larry Mark Epstein
Party	Democratic	Republican
Popular vote	770,232	297,661
Percentage	72.13%	27.87%
- County results Goldstein: 60–70% 70–80% 80–90%
Comptroller before election
Louis L. Goldstein
Democratic
Elected Comptroller
Louis L. Goldstein
Democratic

The 1990 Maryland comptroller election was held on November 6, 1990, in order to elect the comptroller of Maryland. Democratic nominee and incumbent comptroller Louis L. Goldstein defeated Republican nominee Larry Mark Epstein.

== General election ==
On election day, November 6, 1990, Democratic nominee Louis L. Goldstein won re-election by a margin of 472,571 votes against his opponent Republican nominee Larry Mark Epstein, thereby retaining Democratic control over the office of comptroller. Goldstein was sworn in for his ninth term on January 3, 1991.

=== Results ===
Maryland Comptroller election, 1990
Party	Candidate	Votes	%
Democratic	Louis L. Goldstein (incumbent)	770,232	72.13
Republican	Larry Mark Epstein	297,661	27.87
Write-in		25	0.00
Total votes		1,067,918	100.00
Democratic hold			
