= 1903 Maryland Comptroller election =

- November 3, 1903

Nominee	Gordon T. Atkinson	L. E. P. Dennis
Party	Democratic	Republican
Popular vote	106,292	93,101
Percentage	52.09%	45.63%
- County results Atkinson: 50–60% 60–70% Dennis: 40–50% 50–60% 60–70%
Comptroller before election
Joshua W. Hering
Democratic
Elected Comptroller
Gordon T. Atkinson
Democratic

The 1903 Maryland comptroller election was held on November 3, 1903, in order to elect the comptroller of Maryland. Democratic nominee Gordon T. Atkinson defeated Republican nominee L. E. P. Dennis, Prohibition nominee Daniel W. Miles and Socialist nominee George L. Wild.

== General election ==
On election day, November 3, 1903, Democratic nominee Gordon T. Atkinson won the election by a margin of 13,191 votes against his foremost opponent Republican nominee L. E. P. Dennis, thereby retaining Democratic control over the office of comptroller. Atkinson was sworn in as the 19th comptroller of Maryland on January 18, 1904.

=== Results ===
Maryland Comptroller election, 1903
Party	Candidate	Votes	%
Democratic	Gordon T. Atkinson	106,292	52.09
Republican	L. E. P. Dennis	93,101	45.63
Prohibition	Daniel W. Miles	3,228	1.58
Socialist	George L. Wild	1,433	0.70
Total votes		204,054	100.00
Democratic hold			
