= 1998 Maryland Comptroller election =

Maryland comptroller election in 1988

- November 3, 1998
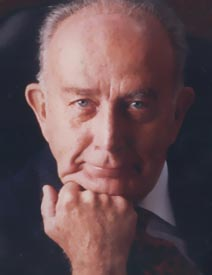

Nominee	William Donald Schaefer	Larry Mark Epstein
Party	Democratic	Republican
Popular vote	924,053	565,291
Percentage	62.01%	37.93%
- County results Schaefer: 50–60% 60–70% 70–80% 80–90% Epstein: 50–60% 60–70% 70–80%
Comptroller before election
Robert L. Swann (Acting)
Democratic
Elected Comptroller
William Donald Schaefer
Democratic

The 1998 Maryland comptroller election was held on November 3, 1998, in order to elect the comptroller of Maryland. Democratic nominee and former governor of Maryland William Donald Schaefer defeated Republican nominee Larry Mark Epstein.

== General election ==
On election day, November 3, 1998, Democratic nominee William Donald Schaefer won the election by a margin of 358,762 votes against his opponent Republican nominee Larry Mark Epstein, thereby retaining Democratic control over the office of comptroller. Schaefer was sworn in as the 32nd comptroller of Maryland on January 3, 1999.

=== Results ===
Maryland Comptroller election, 1998
Party	Candidate	Votes	%
Democratic	William Donald Schaefer	924,053	62.01
Republican	Larry Mark Epstein	565,291	37.93
Write-in		856	0.06
Total votes		1,490,200	100.00
Democratic hold			
