= 1946 Maryland Comptroller election =

- November 5, 1946

Nominee	James J. Lacy	Alexander T. Grier
Party	Democratic	Republican
Popular vote	247,686	199,201
Percentage	55.43%	44.57%
- County results Lacy: 50–60% 60–70% Grier: 50–60% 60–70%
Comptroller before election
J. Millard Tawes
Democratic
Elected Comptroller
James J. Lacy
Democratic

The 1946 Maryland comptroller election was held on November 5, 1946, in order to elect the comptroller of Maryland. Democratic nominee James J. Lacy defeated Republican nominee Alexander T. Grier.

== General election ==
On election day, November 5, 1946, Democratic nominee James J. Lacy won the election by a margin of 48,485 votes against his opponent Republican nominee Alexander T. Grier, thereby retaining Democratic control over the office of comptroller. Lacy was sworn in as the 28th comptroller of Maryland on January 3, 1947.

=== Results ===
Maryland Comptroller election, 1946
Party	Candidate	Votes	%
Democratic	James J. Lacy	247,686	55.43
Republican	Alexander T. Grier	199,201	44.57
Total votes		446,887	100.00
Democratic hold			
