= 1934 Maryland Attorney General election =

- November 6, 1934
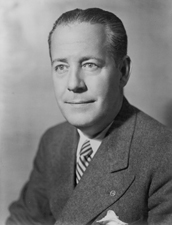

Nominee	Herbert O'Conor	George Henderson
Party	Democratic	Republican
Popular vote	280,957	177,689
Percentage	60.28%	38.12%
- County results O'Conor: 50–60% 60–70% Henderson: 40–50% 50–60% 60–70%
Attorney General before election
William Preston Lane Jr.
Democratic
Elected Attorney General
Herbert O'Conor
Democratic

The 1934 Maryland attorney general election was held on November 6, 1934, in order to elect the attorney general of Maryland. Democratic nominee Herbert O'Conor defeated Republican nominee George Henderson, Socialist nominee William A. Toole, Labor nominee Robert W. Stevens and Communist nominee Tom Pinkerton.

== General election ==
On election day, November 6, 1934, Democratic nominee Herbert O'Conor won the election by a margin of 103,268 votes against his foremost opponent Republican nominee George Henderson, thereby retaining Democratic control over the office of attorney general. O'Conor was sworn in as the 32nd attorney general of Maryland on January 3, 1935.

=== Results ===
Maryland Attorney General election, 1934
Party	Candidate	Votes	%
Democratic	Herbert O'Conor	280,957	60.28
Republican	George Henderson	177,689	38.12
Socialist	William A. Toole	4,792	1.02
Labor	Robert W. Stevens	1,770	0.38
Communist	Tom Pinkerton	916	0.20
Total votes		466,124	100.00
Democratic hold			
