= Trumbo =

Trumbo may refer to:

== Film ==
- Trumbo (2007 film), a 2007 documentary film about Dalton Trumbo
- Trumbo (2015 film), a 2015 biographical film about Dalton Trumbo

== People ==
- Andrew Trumbo (1797–1871), American politician
- Arthur C. Trumbo, original owner of the A. C. Trumbo House, built 1906
- Bill Trumbo (1939–2018), American college basketball coach
- Christopher Trumbo (1940–2011), American writer, son of Dalton Trumbo
- Dalton Trumbo (1905–1976), American screenwriter and novelist
- Isaac Trumbo (1858–1912), California businessman
- Lewis Trumbo (1802–1869), American politician
- Malfourd W. Trumbo (born 1954), American politician and jurist
- Mark Trumbo (born 1986), American baseball player
- Phil Trumbo, American art director, graphic designer, and film director
- Steve Trumbo (born 1960), American basketball player

== See also ==
- Trumbo Point, an American naval base
