= 1926 Maryland Comptroller election =

- November 2, 1926

Nominee	William S. Gordy Jr.	Charles F. Goodell
Party	Democratic	Republican
Popular vote	197,480	130,399
Percentage	59.61%	39.36%
- County results Gordy: 50–60% 60–70% Goodell: 50–60% 60–70%
Comptroller before election
William S. Gordy Jr.
Democratic
Elected Comptroller
William S. Gordy Jr.
Democratic

The 1926 Maryland comptroller election was held on November 2, 1926, in order to elect the comptroller of Maryland. Democratic nominee and incumbent comptroller William S. Gordy Jr. defeated Republican nominee Charles F. Goodell and Socialist nominee James L. Smiley.

== General election ==
On election day, November 2, 1926, Democratic nominee William S. Gordy Jr. won re-election by a margin of 67,081 votes against his foremost opponent Republican nominee Charles F. Goodell, thereby retaining Democratic control over the office of comptroller. Gordy was sworn in for his third term on January 3, 1927.

=== Results ===
Maryland Comptroller election, 1926
Party	Candidate	Votes	%
Democratic	William S. Gordy Jr. (incumbent)	197,480	59.61
Republican	Charles F. Goodell	130,399	39.36
Socialist	James L. Smiley	3,430	1.03
Total votes		331,309	100.00
Democratic hold			
