= 1915 Maryland Attorney General election =

- November 2, 1915
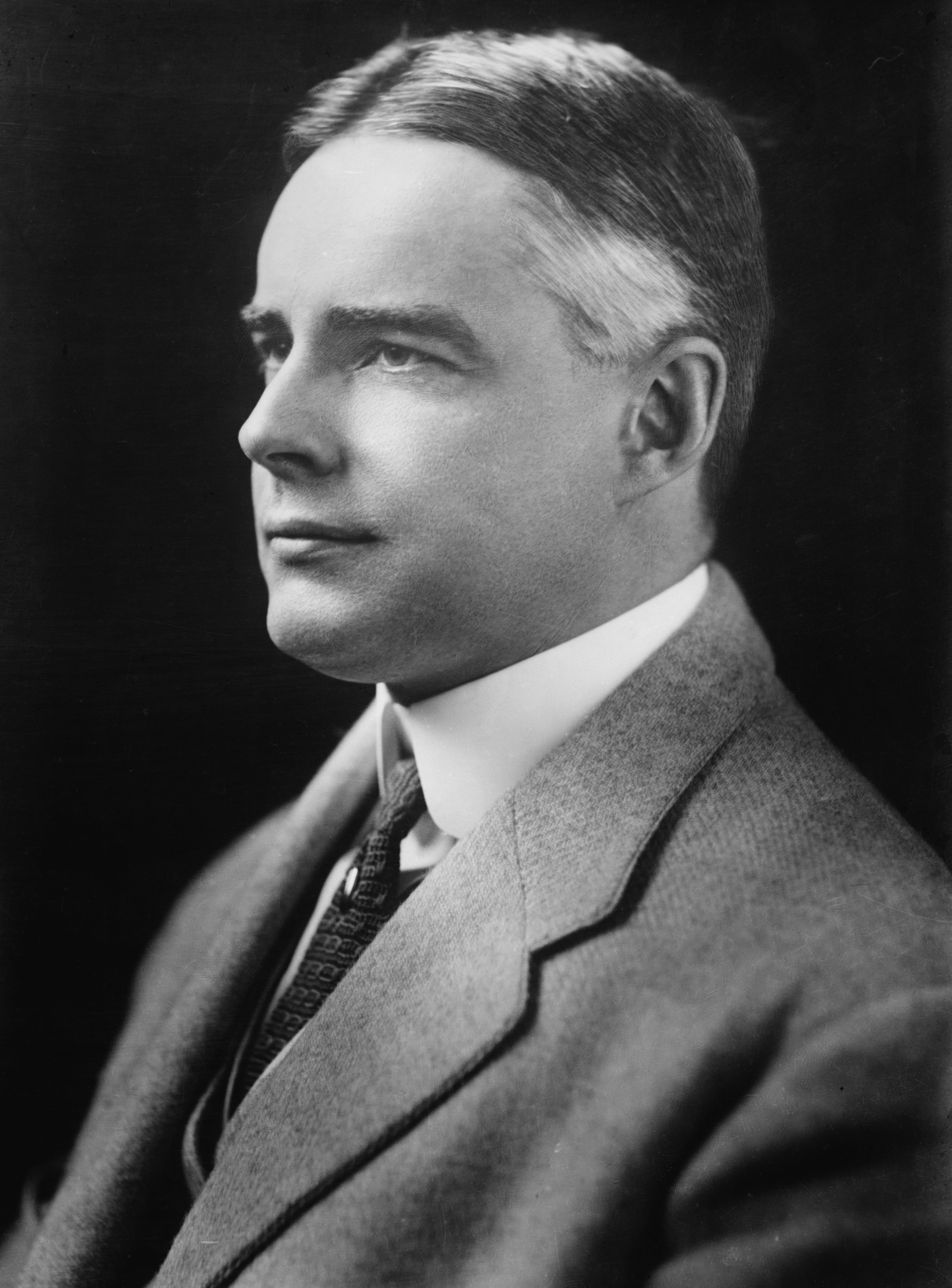

Nominee	Albert Ritchie	Albert A. Doub
Party	Democratic	Republican
Popular vote	122,836	98,154
Percentage	54.15%	43.27%
- County results Ritchie: 40–50% 50–60% Doub: 40–50% 50–60% 60–70%
Attorney General before election
Edgar Allan Poe
Democratic
Elected Attorney General
Albert Ritchie
Democratic

The 1915 Maryland attorney general election was held on November 2, 1915, in order to elect the attorney general of Maryland. Democratic nominee Albert Ritchie defeated Republican nominee Albert A. Doub, Prohibition nominee N. Irvin Gressitt, Socialist nominee Paul Braun and Labor nominee Frank N.H. Lang.

== General election ==
On election day, November 2, 1915, Democratic nominee Albert Ritchie won the election by a margin of 24,682 votes against his foremost opponent Republican nominee Albert A. Doub, thereby retaining Democratic control over the office of attorney general. Ritchie was sworn in as the 27th attorney general of Maryland on January 3, 1916.

=== Results ===
Maryland Attorney General election, 1915
Party	Candidate	Votes	%
Democratic	Albert Ritchie	122,836	54.15
Republican	Albert A. Doub	98,154	43.27
Prohibition	N. Irvin Gressitt	2,616	1.15
Socialist	Paul Braun	2,415	1.07
Labor	Frank N.H. Lang	818	0.36
Total votes		226,839	100.00
Democratic hold			
