= William Henry Purnell =

American lawyer and army officer (1826–1902)

4th Comptroller of Maryland
- In office 1856–1861

Personal details
- Born: March 4, 1826 Worcester County, Maryland, US
- Died: March 30, 1902 (aged 76) New Castle County, Delaware, US
- Party: Know Nothing; Republican
- Education: University of Delaware
- Occupation: Lawyer, educator, soldier, politician

Military service
- Allegiance: United States
- Branch/service: Maryland National Guard
- Years of service: 1861–1862
- Rank: colonel
- Battles/wars: American Civil War

William Henry Purnell (March 4, 1826 – March 30, 1902) was a Maryland lawyer who served as the Comptroller of Maryland (1856–1861), Union officer during the American Civil War and later as President of the reorganized University of Delaware and of Hood College.

== Early and family life ==
Born in Worcester County, Maryland to Moses Purnell and his wife, Maria (Bowen) Purnell, in 1826. In 1846, Purnell received a degree from Delaware College (now the University of Delaware), which he would come to lead later in his career. After graduation, he moved to Snow Hill, Maryland to read law with Judge Franklin. On June 13, 1849, still in Snow Hill, he married Margaret Neill Martin. They would have ten children, including four daughters and a son before 1860.

== Career ==
Purnell was admitted to the Maryland bar and practiced law, eventually becoming associated with the Know-Nothing Party. In 1856 Maryland voters elected Purnell to statewide office as comptroller and he moved his family to Annapolis. Re-elected in 1860, Purnell would quit that office in 1861 as newly elected President Abraham Lincoln appointed him as post master of Baltimore, a key patronage appointment.

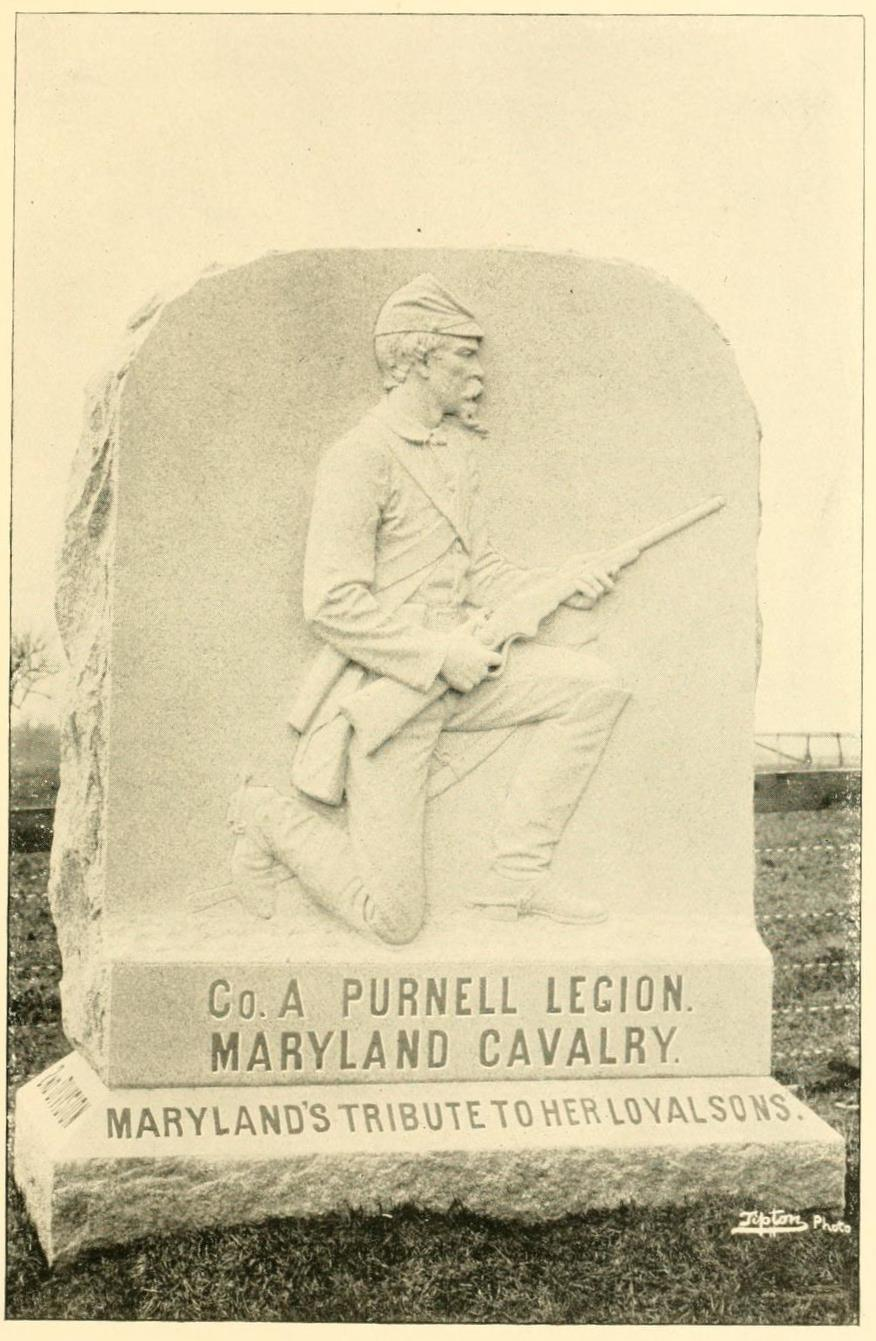
Purnell Legion MD Cavalry p98

As the United States Civil War began and after the defeat at the First Battle of Bull Run made clear that the war would not end quickly, Purnell resigned his federal position and recruited troops from Baltimore, the northern Chesapeake Bay Counties and Maryland's Eastern shore at Pikesville, Maryland under the special direction of the Secretary of War. The unit was nicknamed "Purnell's Legion", and included nine companies of infantry, two companies of cavalry, and two batteries of light artillery, all assigned to Dix's Division.

Its first assignment was on Maryland's Eastern Shore, to break up a potential Confederate encampment. Although the units would continue to serve for three years (and many til the war's end), Purnell resigned from the military, holding the rank of colonel, in February 1862 and resumed the position of post master of Baltimore. This resignation was endorsed by Major General John Adams Dix. The legion then became a regiment of infantry, two independent companies of cavalry and two independent artillery batteries. The infantry would then be assigned to Pope's Army of Virginia and later to the Army of the Potomac, and while held in reserve at the Second Battle of Bull Run, fight in the Maryland Campaign and Battle of Antietam, then the actions around Petersburg and Richmond, Virginia, before being amalgamated into the 1st Maryland Infantry at war's end. One of the cavalry units, dismounted, would earn distinction at the Battle of Gettysburg.

From 1864 to 1866, Purnell was chairman of the Union Party's Central Committee. President Andrew Johnson then appointed him assessor of internal revenue for Baltimore. He retired from politics in 1867 and resumed his legal practice in Baltimore.

In 1870, Purnell became the president of Delaware College, and moved to New Castle County, Delaware with his family. He was the institution's first president after its revival as a Land Grant College. Purnell was a strong supporter of co-education but after a fifteen-year trial, Delaware College stopped accepting female students by a vote of the board on June 24, 1885.

At the same meeting, the board accepted Purnells resignation as college president, but he continued as a trustee.

Purnell than accepted the presidency of Hood College, a female seminary in Frederick, Maryland, and later of New Windsor College in Carroll County, Maryland, only to return to his alma mater in 1897 as an instructor in oratory, which position he held until his death.

== Death and legacy ==
Purnell died in 1902. In addition to the historical markers erected on battlefields to honor Purnell's legion, in 1972, the University of Delaware dedicated a building in his honor, specifically recognizing his efforts to educate women.
