= Kitterman–Buckey Farm =

- U.S. National Register of Historic Places
- Location within Maryland Location within the United States
- Location: 12529 Molasses Road, Johnsville, Maryland
- Coordinates: 39°31′43″N 77°13′27″W
- Area: 24 acres (9.7 ha)
- Built: 1752
- Architectural style: Federal
- NRHP reference No.: 05001479
- Added to NRHP: December 28, 2005

Kitterman–Buckey Farm is a historic home and farm complex located at Johnsville, Frederick County, Maryland. It is the remnant of the farm that was established by the German immigrant Christopher Kitterman in 1752, and which remained in the Root/Buckey family from 1790 to 1919. The main house was built about 1752 and is two stories in height. It is composed of two halves, built probably 40 to 50 years apart, and united under a low-sloping slate roof with three chimneys, with additions made in the 19th century and again in the 1950s and 1980s. Also on the property are a springhouse and cabin / smokehouse both dating to about 1752, a machine shed, horse barn built about 1930, a bank barn built about 1850, and a silo from 1934.

It was listed on the National Register of Historic Places in 2005.
