= Lewis Trumbo =

American politician (1802–1869)

Member of the Maryland House of Delegates
- In office 1849

Personal details
- Born: October 15, 1802
- Died: February 14, 1869 (aged 66) Westminster, Maryland, U.S.
- Party: Whig
- Spouse: Sarah

Lewis Trumbo (October 15, 1802 – February 14, 1869) was an American politician from Maryland. He served as sheriff of Carroll County, Maryland from 1845 to 1849 and served as a member of the Maryland House of Delegates in 1849.

== Early life ==
Lewis Trumbo was born on October 15, 1802.

== Career ==
Trumbo ran as a Whig for sheriff of Carroll County, Maryland, in 1842, losing to J. Henry Hoppe. Trumbo served as sheriff of Carroll County, Maryland, from 1845 to 1848. Trumbo served as a member of the Maryland House of Delegates, representing Carroll County, in 1849.

== Personal life ==
Trumbo married Sarah. She died on February 18, 1870. His daughter Margaret Henrietta married state senator and comptroller Joshua W. Hering.

Trumbo died on February 14, 1869, at his home in Westminster, Maryland.
