= Johnsville, Maryland =

Unincorporated community in Maryland, U.S.

Coordinates: 39°32′02″N 77°13′51″W

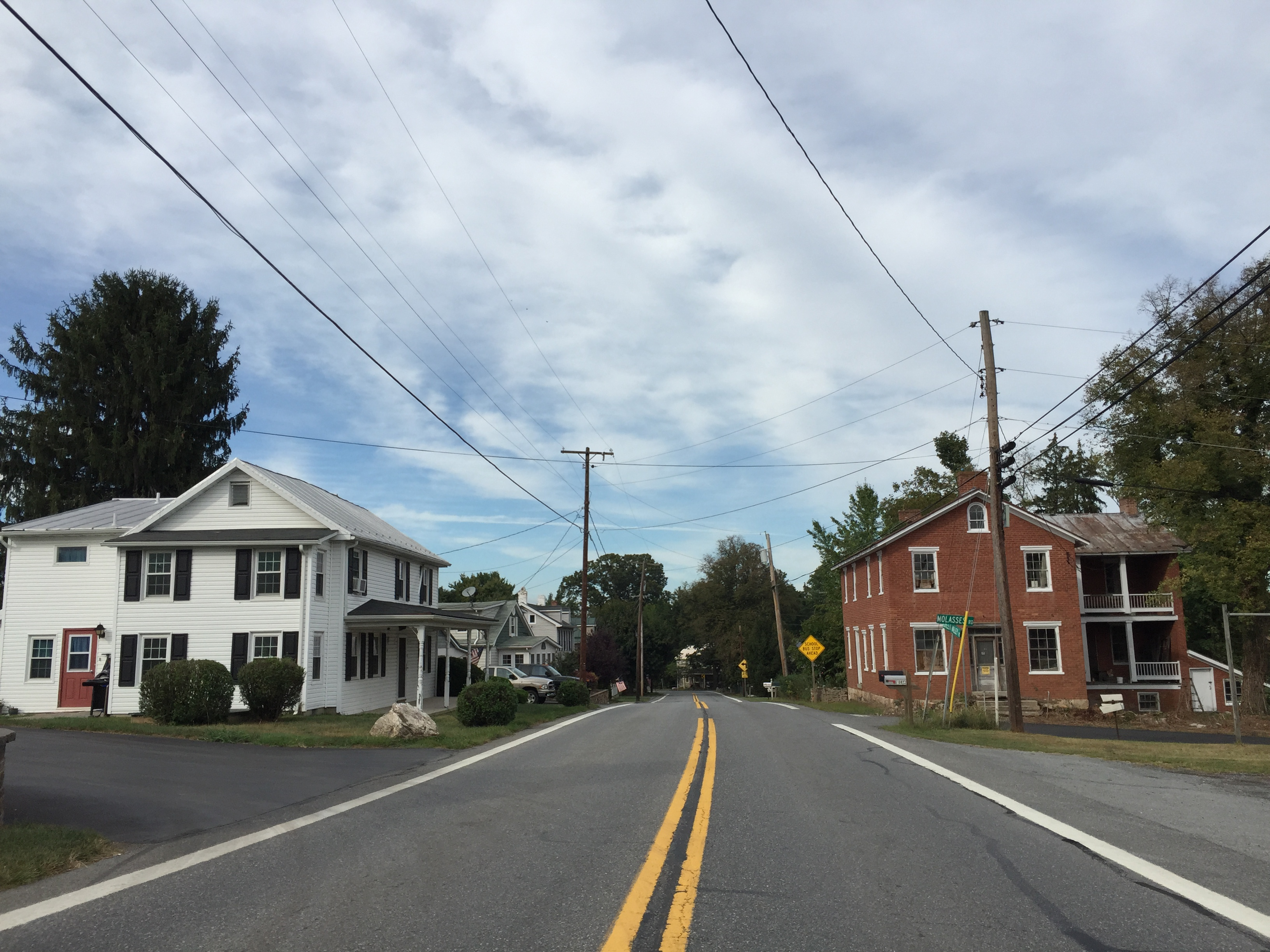
MD 75 through Johnsville

Johnsville is an unincorporated community in Frederick County, Maryland, United States. It is located approximately halfway between Libertytown and Union Bridge along Maryland Route 75 (Green Valley Rd). The Kitterman-Buckey Farm was listed on the National Register of Historic Places in 2005.

== History ==
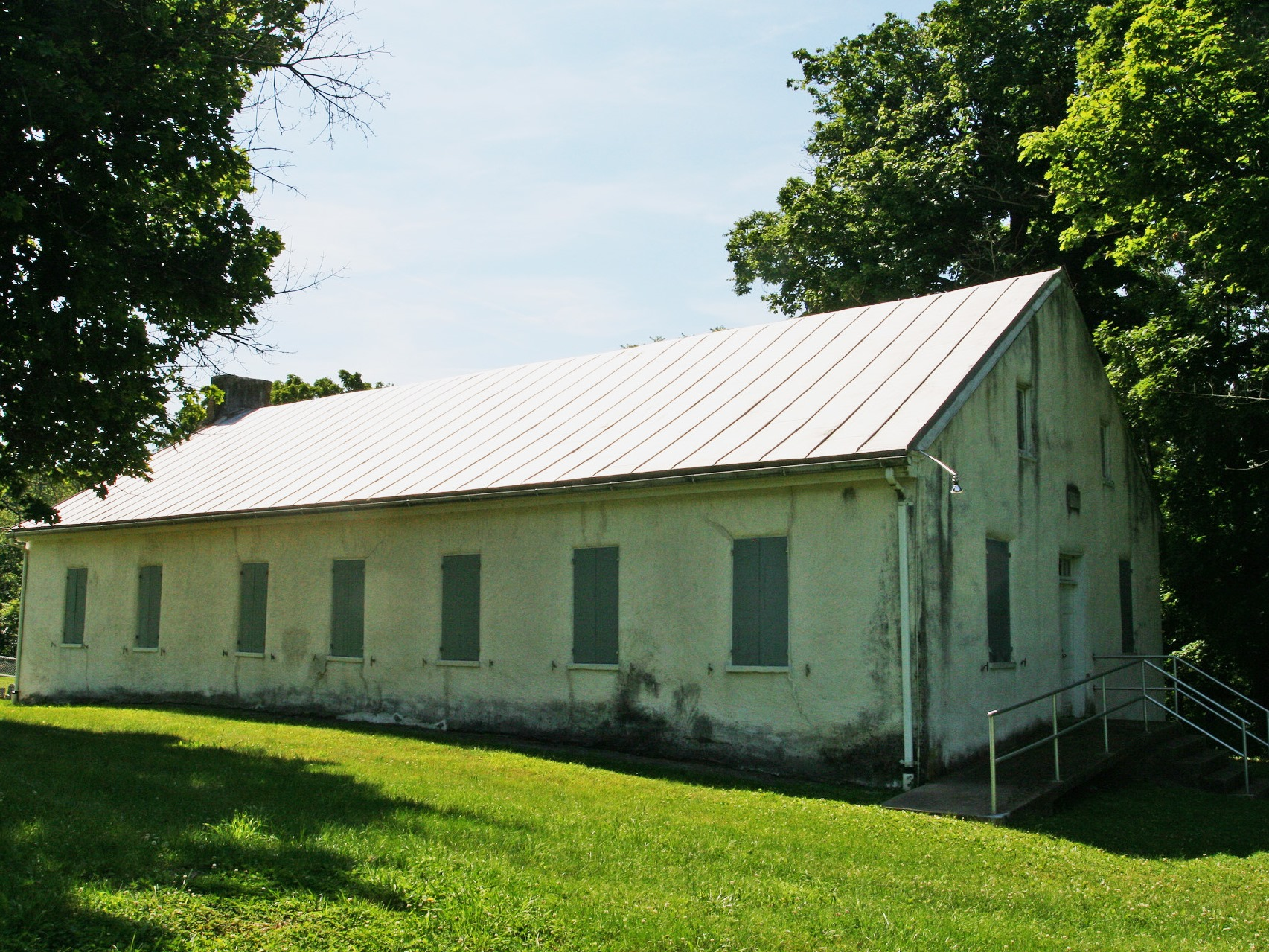
The 1832 meeting house of the Beaver Dam German Baptist Congregation (Church of the Brethren) near Johnsville, Maryland

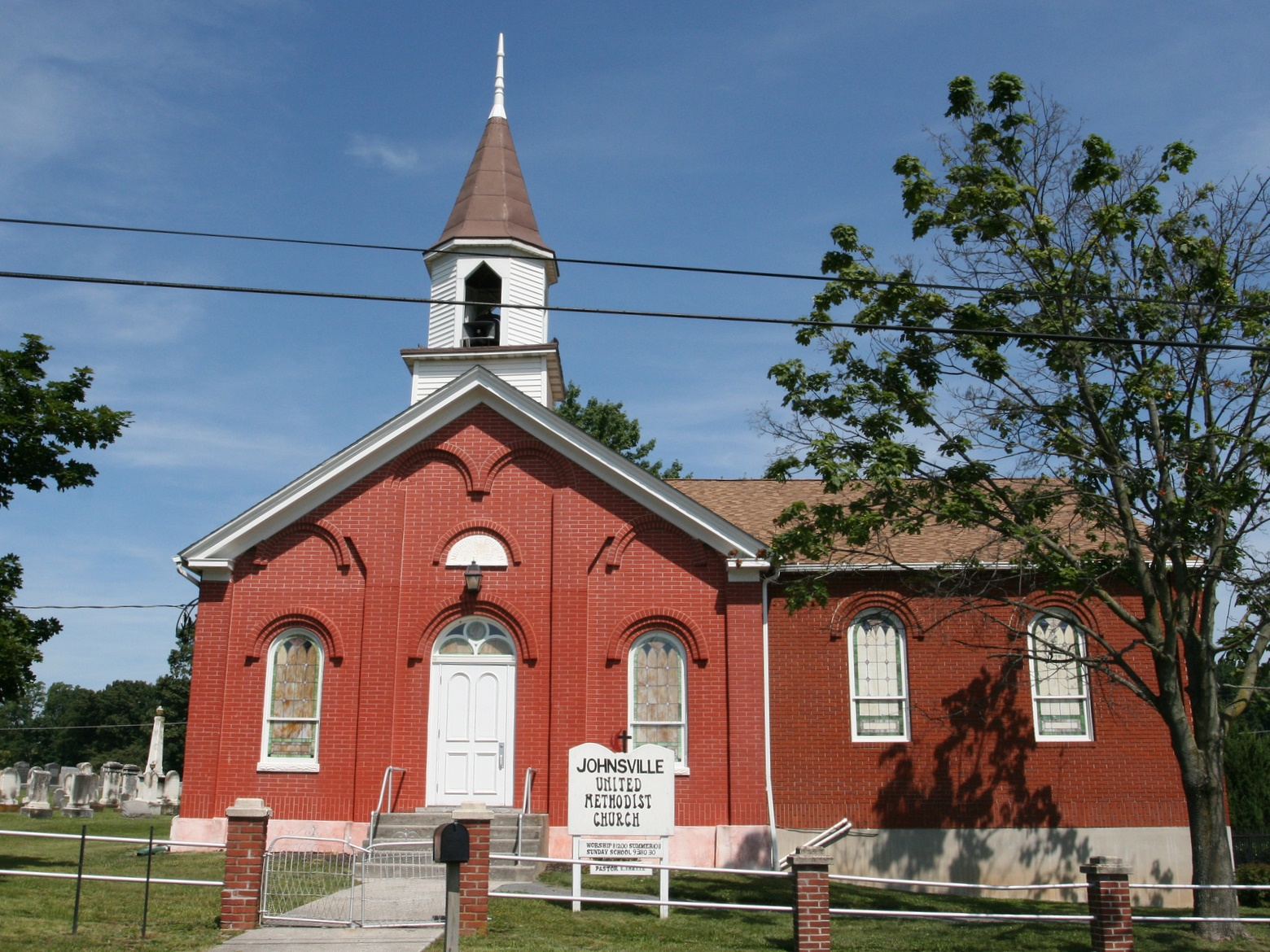
The 1842 Johnsville Methodist Protestant (United Methodist) Church in Johnsville, Maryland

The town of Johnsville was first settled by English and German immigrants in the 1740s, including the Birely and Iler families. In the 1770s, a congregation of German Baptists or "Dunkers" organized Beaver Dam Church two miles northeast of the present town, the second oldest Church of the Brethren congregation in Frederick County. In the early 19th century, the town of Johnsville developed to serve the needs of travelers on the main road leading from southern Pennsylvania to Frederick, the specific location of the town being almost halfway between Union Bridge and Libertytown. In 1854, the General Assembly of Maryland created a new election district with Johnsville at its center. A map of Frederick County, drawn by Isaac Bond in 1858, records the presence of a hotel, a wheelwright's shop, a blacksmith's shop, two stores, a post office, school, a physician, and two churches (Methodist Episcopal and Methodist Protestant) in Johnsville.

Johnsville retains much of its rural community aesthetic and historical integrity today. Historic structures along the single street through the town document its important role as a place where travelers could obtain necessary services while moving between larger population and commercial centers. A few of the historic structures in Johnsville include the Methodist Protestant Church (today Johnsville United Methodist Church), built in 1842 and displaying intricate brickwork resulting from a later renovation; the Johnsville Schoolhouse, built in 1903; the former Methodist Episcopal Church, a frame Gothic Revival structure built in 1851; the Grove Store, a large compound structure with combined commercial and residential spaces built in 1875 in Italianate style; the Wolf House, a circa 1840 Greek Revival styled house with later Italianate porch; and the Dr. Sidewell House, a compound stone and brick structure reflecting two periods of construction (circa 1810 and 1840).

Nearby, the Beaver Dam Church of the Brethren maintains two historic buildings: an 1832 meetinghouse and an 1882 brick meetinghouse.

== Geography ==
The community is in eastern Frederick County, along Maryland Route 75 (Green Valley Road), which leads east 9 miles (14 km) to New Windsor and south 19 miles (31 km) to Hyattstown.
