= Sales tax audit =

A sales tax audit is the examination of a company's financial documents by a government's tax agency to verify if the proper amount of sales tax has been remitted to the proper authority. Bob Meighan, writing for Huffington Post, stated that "only 1.1 percent of individual taxpayers receive an audit letter every year", and out of them, "75 percent of audits are conducted entirely by mail".

Businesses also conduct their own internal audits of sales tax records to see if they reflect cumulative changes to various federal, state, and local laws and regulations.
