= Robert L. Swann (comptroller of Maryland) =

American politician

Comptroller of Maryland
- In office July 9, 1998 – January 25, 1999
- Appointed by: Parris Glendening
- Governor: Parris Glendening
- Preceded by: Louis L. Goldstein
- Succeeded by: William Donald Schaefer

Personal details
- Born: December 4, 1935 (age 90)

Robert L. Swann (born December 4, 1935) served as comptroller of the State of Maryland in the United States. He was appointed to the position following the death of his long-serving predecessor, Louis L. Goldstein, in July 1998 and served until January 1999, when former Governor William Donald Schaefer took office after having won the November 1998 election. Swann retired from state service in 1999 after 39 years in the comptroller's office.

Swann went on to serve as a Calvert County commissioner from 2000 through 2002. He was a member of the Executive

Board of the Tri-County Council for Southern Maryland from 1999 through 2007 and served as interim executive director of the Council in 2000 and 2006. He has served as chairman of the Board of Governors of the Calvert Marine Museum, president of the Friends of Jefferson Patterson Park and Museum, chairman of the Board of Directors of the Asbury-Solomons Retirement Center and secretary of the Patuxent Partnership. He is a member of the Executive Board and past president of the Solomons Civic Association. He is a life member and past commodore of the Solomons Island Yacht Club. He has served on the Vestry of his church, Middleham-St.Peter's Episcopal Parish. He is a past president of the Calvert County Sportsman's Club, member of Post 88, 29th Infantry Division Association, member of Calvert Elks Lodge Post 2620 and was the first President of the Calvert County Fire and Rescue Association.

Swann was the recipient of the Patterson Prize in recognition of his support for the establishment of the Jefferson Patterson Park and Museum in Calvert County. In 1999, he was named State Employee of the year by the Maryland Chapter of the American Society for Public Administration. This award recognizes an employee's single outstanding accomplishment or sustained high quality of performance over a significant period of time in State of Maryland government service.

He resides with his wife, Dorothy DeBoy Swann in Solomons Island, Maryland.

== Notes ==
Political offices
Preceded by Louis L. Goldstein	Comptroller of Maryland; 1998–1999	Succeeded by William Donald Schaefer
