= Joshua W. Hering =

American politician and physician (1833–1913)

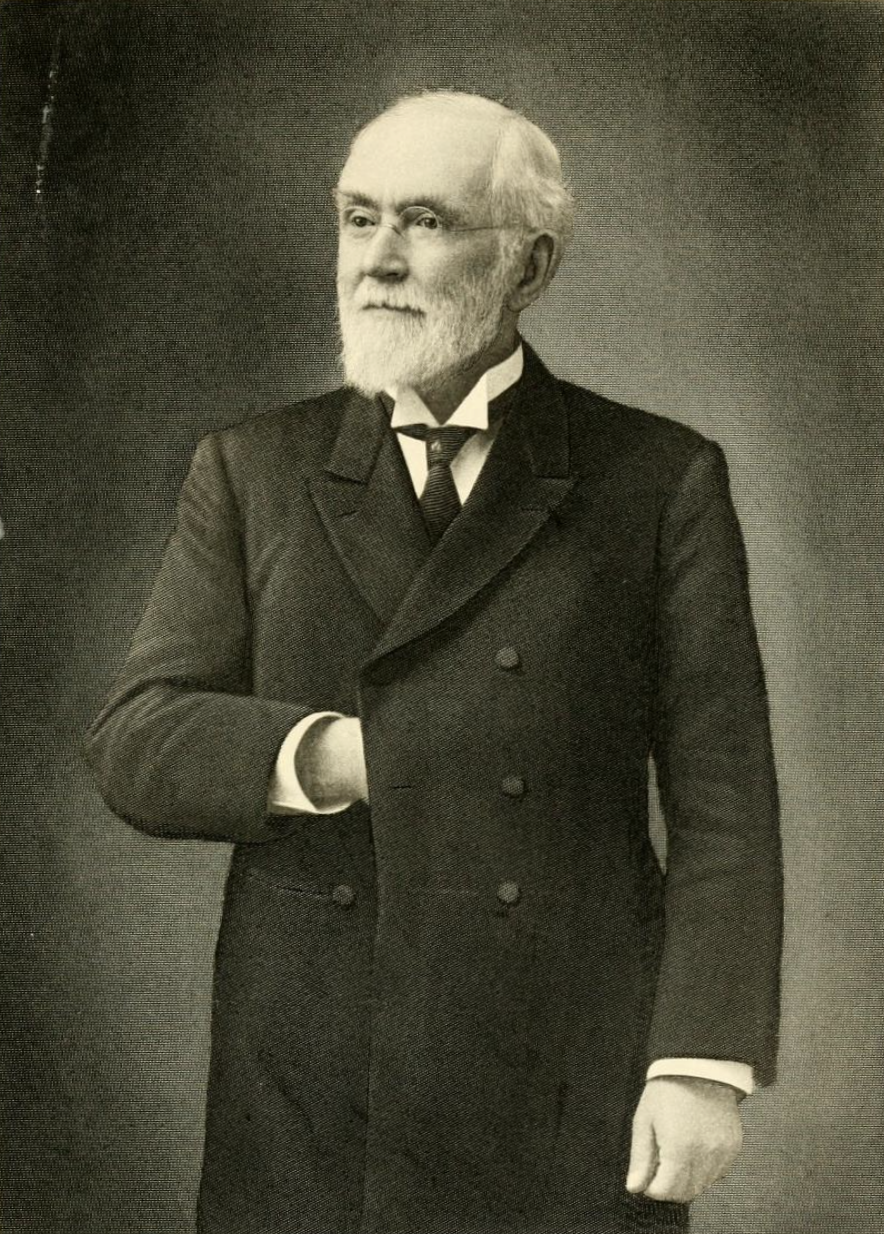
- Hering in 1910 publication

Comptroller of Maryland
- In office 1908 – June 1, 1910
- Governor: Austin Lane Crothers
- Preceded by: Gordon T. Atkinson
- Succeeded by: William B. Clagett
- In office 1900–1904
- Governor: John W. Smith
- Preceded by: Phillips Lee Goldsborough
- Succeeded by: Gordon T. Atkinson

Member of the Maryland Senate
- In office 1896–1900
- Preceded by: Pinkney J. Bennett
- Succeeded by: Johnzie E. Beasman

Personal details
- Born: Joshua Webster Hering; March 8, 1833 Johnsville, Maryland, U.S.
- Died: September 23, 1913 (aged 80) Westminster, Maryland, U.S.
- Resting place: Westminster Cemetery; Westminster, Maryland, U.S.
- Party: Democratic
- Spouse(s): Margaret Henrietta Trumbo (m. 1855; died 1883) Catherine E. Armacost (m. 1888)
- Children: 4
- Education: University of Maryland School of Medicine (MD)
- Occupation: Politician; physician; banker; financier
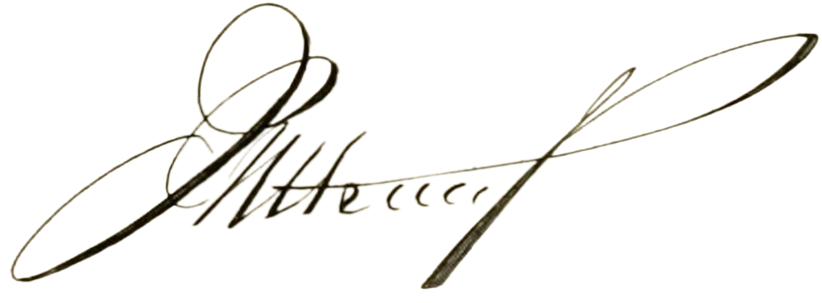
- Signature

Joshua Webster Hering (March 8, 1833 – September 23, 1913) was an American politician, physician and banker. He served as a member of the Maryland Senate from 1896 to 1900 and as Comptroller of Maryland from 1900 to 1904 and 1908 to 1910.

== Early life and education ==
Joshua Webster Hering was born on March 8, 1833, in Johnsville, Frederick County, Maryland, to Margaret (née Orr) and Daniel S. Hering. His father was an immigrant from Switzerland. His father was a farmer and miller and served as state flour inspector in Baltimore. At the age of fifteen, Hering left his father's home to work at a country store in Johnsville. He worked there from December 13, 1847, to April 7, 1851. He then moved to Westminster and worked at the Jacob Reese & Son store until April 1853. Hering was educated in public schools and graduated from the University of Maryland School of Medicine in 1855 with a Doctor of Medicine. At the school, he studied under George W. Miltenberger.

== Career ==
Hering practiced medicine in Westminster, following his graduation, from 1855 to November 1867. In 1867, worked part time as a physician due to ill health. In 1867, Hering was elected cashier of the Union National Bank of Westminster. He worked there until 1913. He also worked as a financier. In 1870, Hering became a charter member of the Mutual Fire Insurance Company of Carroll County. He served as president of that organization after 1872.

In 1895, Hering was elected as a Democrat to the Maryland Senate. He served two terms, from 1896 to 1900. He was a member of the finance committee and the corporation committee. He served as chair of the Committee on Reevaluation and Assessment and the Joint Conference Committee. In 1899, Hering was elected as Comptroller of Maryland. He served from 1900 to 1904. He was elected again in 1907. He served from 1908 to 1910. On June 1, 1910, Hering resigned as comptroller to accept an appointment by Governor Austin Lane Crothers as a member of the Public Service Commission of Maryland for a term of four years. He served in this role until his death.

In 1892, Hering was elected as president of the General Conference in Westminster of the Methodist Protestant Church. He served again as president in Kansas City in 1896. He was a member of the General Conference from 1870 to 1904. He was a co-founder and member of the board of governors of the Westminster Theological Seminary. He also served as the first treasurer of the board of governors. In 1895, Hering served as one of the original board of managers of the Home for the Aged of the Methodist Protestant Church in Westminster. He was elected as president of the Maryland Bankers' Association in 1899. He was a charter member of the Maryland Educational Endowment Society of the Methodist Protestant Church and a member of the board of managers of the Westminster Cemetery Company. He also served as director of the Baltimore and Reisterstown Turnpike Company.

In 1868, Hering was a charter member of the board of trustees of Western Maryland College. For a time, he served as treasurer and then as president of the board of trustees.

== Personal life ==
Hering married Margaret Henrietta Trumbo, daughter of Lewis Trumbo, on October 18, 1855. They had two sons and two daughters, Joseph T., Charles E., Mrs. Thomas A. Murray and Mrs. Frank Z. Miller. His wife died on September 27, 1883. Hering married Catherine E. Armacost, daughter of John Armacost, on March 7, 1888. They had no children.

Hering lived in Westminster. He died on September 23, 1913, in Westminster. He was buried at Westminster Cemetery.

== Legacy and awards ==
Hering received an honorary Master of Arts degree from Western Maryland College in 1885. He received an honorary Doctor of Laws from St. John's College in Annapolis in 1900 and an honorary Doctor of Laws from the University of Maryland School of Law in 1909.
