= Labor Party of the United States =

1919-20 labor party in the United States

- Chairman: Max S. Hayes
- Secretary: Frank J. Esper
- Editor: Robert M. Buck
- Founded: August 18, 1919
- Dissolved: July 13, 1920
- Succeeded by: Farmer-Labor Party of the United States
- Headquarters: Chicago
- Newspaper: The New Majority
- Youth wing: Young People's Labor Club
- Ideology: Left-wing populism; Social democracy
- Political position: Left-wing
- International affiliation: Berne International

The Labor Party of the United States was a short-lived political party formed by several state-level labor parties upon the encouragement of Chicago Federation of Labor leader John Fitzpatrick. It was formed in the immediate aftermath of World War I, due in large part to deterioration in the condition of the country's workers due to the imbalance between static workers' wages and rapidly escalating prices for necessities and consumer goods.

The party quickly sought to unify the forces of the country's industrial workers with the farmers' movement and cooperative movement, as the nation's farmers had also been hit hard by declining agricultural prices during the war years and the economic interests of urban workers and rural farmers fell into alignment. On July 13, 1920, the Labor Party merged with the Committee of 48 to form the Farmer-Labor Party.

== History ==
=== Background ===
The aftermath of the First World War had the effect of producing, throughout the world, the greatest revolutionary wave seen since the Revolutions of 1848. Regimes which had defined their time before the war were abruptly overthrown in Russia, Germany, Austria, Hungary and Turkey. Revolutionary nationalism spread throughout nations, such as the Poles, Finns and Irish, which had been subject to centuries of domination by the great powers. Even the greatest empire on the face of the planet was unable to escape the socioeconomic effects of the War and its aftermath, as the United Kingdom's entire political system was turned on its head when Labour superseded the Liberals as the official opposition to Conservative government in 1922, and ascended to form a government themselves by 1924.

The United States was not immune to the effects of the War or its aftermath. Upon entering the War, the prices of nearly every industrial product produced in the United States began to rapidly escalate, while workers' wages were kept static and the prices for agricultural goods paid to farmers went into decline due to overproduction. The Wilson Administration, primarily interested in waging the War, began to favor management in the event of any strikes which occurred and propaganda was disseminated labeling all who did not selflessly contribute to the war effort to be disloyal and un-American. Even worse, as the War ended, the economic bubble which it had produced burst and the United States was thrust first into the Post–World War I recession, and then into the Depression of 1920–21.

Against this backdrop, the farmers and industrial workers of America were beginning to respond to the pressures which they had been forced to shoulder. Beginning as early as 1915, the Non-Partisan League began to develop in North Dakota and by 1917 the Union Labor Party was formed in Duluth, Minnesota. In 1918, the Minnesota arm of the Farmer's Non-Partisan League merged with the Union Labor Party and the Worker's Non-Partisan League to form the Farmer-Labor Party of Minnesota. At the same time, a strike by the International Association of Machinists in Connecticut was evolving to create the American Labor Party and the Chicago Federation of Labor was leading the charge to organize the Labor Party of Cook County in Illinois.

Over the course of the next year, the Labor Party of Cook County and the Illinois Federation of Labor joined forces to help form the Labor Party of Illinois, while workers in New York City established the American Labor Party of Greater New York, which quickly evolved into the American Labor Party of New York State. By August 1919, labor parties had been established in seven states, including Minnesota, Connecticut, Illinois, New York, Kansas, Ohio, and South Dakota. By November, labor parties would exist in all 48 states.

=== Formation ===
On August 18, 1919, representatives of the seven labor parties convened the National Conference of Representatives of Labor Party Groups, where the parties agreed that they would establish a national organization of the Labor Party of the United States. They determined to issue a call to the first convention of the new party, which would be held on November 22 in Chicago. The call specified that the central bodies of the labor federations in each state would each be entitled to one delegate, the labor parties and individual labor unions would be entitled to one delegate for every five-hundred members, and the Non-Partisan League, Committee of 48, Social Democratic League and British Labour Party, among others, would each be entitled to send one fraternal delegate. The Conference elected a temporary Executive Committee with former AFL presidential contender Max S. Hayes as its chair, and adopted Robert M. Buck's The New Majority as the party's official newspaper.

The convention met, as planned, on November 22, 1919. Around one thousand delegates attended, representing the original seven labor parties, as well as labor unions and new labor parties from throughout the country. The convention quickly elected Hayes as permanent chair of the party, John H. Walker as vice-chair and Frank J. Esper as national secretary-treasurer. The keynote address was given by Chicago Federation of Labor leader John Fitzpatrick, who had been absolutely instrumental in the development of the party. The convention also adopted a declaration of principles (which was patterned heavily on the Labor Party of Cook County's earlier 14 Points of Labor) and a party constitution, both of which ultimately ended up surviving the Labor Party itself.

Among the things demanded in the declaration of principles were the complete repeal of the Espionage Act of 1917, complete equality for all sexes and races, an end to labor injunctions, cost of living reductions, the nationalization of public utilities and natural resources, the enactment of the Plumb Plan to nationalize the railroads, free public education "from kindergarten to university" and democratic education, the introduction of the powers of popular initiative, referendum and recall at the federal level, the abolition of the United States Senate, a maximum term of four years for federal judges, the introduction of a nationwide age of consent of 18 years, the abolition of the employment of all minors under the age of 16 years, the institution of minimum wages and minimum prices for agricultural goods, an end to the use of convict labor and foreign labor to undercut American workers' wages, a maximum work day of 8 hour and a maximum work week of 44 hours, and full employment.

=== Merger ===
It was, however, clear from the beginning that, at least at this particular time, the interests of urban workers and rural farmers were so intertwined that they had really become one and the same. Moreover, the Labor Party, which was formed from the labor movement (and thus had significant overlap with the industrial democratic tendencies of the Socialist Party of America), had a particular affinity for the idea of a cooperative commonwealth. All of these concerns fed into the establishment, on February 12, 1920, of the Cooperative Congress.

Composed of members representing the Labor Party, the Committee of 48, the Non-Partisan League, and other groups of the farmers' and cooperative movements, the Cooperative Congress was the first step toward the unification of the forces of labor, agriculture and cooperation. It elected, from among its quorum, a twelve-member All-American Farmer-Labor Cooperative Commission, which would concern itself with the task of paving the way for such a unification.

In July, both the Labor Party and the Committee of 48 assembled their respective conventions in Chicago. On July 13, the Committee of 48 convention joined the Labor Party convention to spectacular fanfare, and it was determined that the two would merge, retaining the Labor Party's constitution and principles, but adopting the new name of the Farmer-Labor Party of the United States. As a symbol of ultimate unity, the convention nominated a presidential ticket comprising Parley P. Christensen, the chair of the Committee of 48 convention, as the nominee for President and Max S. Hayes as the nominee for Vice President.

== Conventions ==
Convention	Location	Date	Notes and references
1st National Convention	Chicago	November 22–25, 1919	
2nd National Convention; Also 1st National Convention of the FLPUS	Chicago	July 11–14, 1920	Merged with Committee of 48 to form FLPUS.

== Officers ==
- Chairman of the National Committee: Max S. Hayes
- Vice-Chairman of the National Committee: John H. Walker
- National Secretary-Treasurer: Frank J. Esper
- Editor of The New Majority: Robert M. Buck

== See also ==
- Farmer-Labor Party (United States)
- American Federation of Labor
- Committee of 48
- Non-Partisan League
- Socialist Party of America
- Chicago Federation of Labor
- John Fitzpatrick (unionist)

=== State affiliates ===
- Minnesota Farmer-Labor Party
