= Louis L. Goldstein =

American politician (1913–1998)

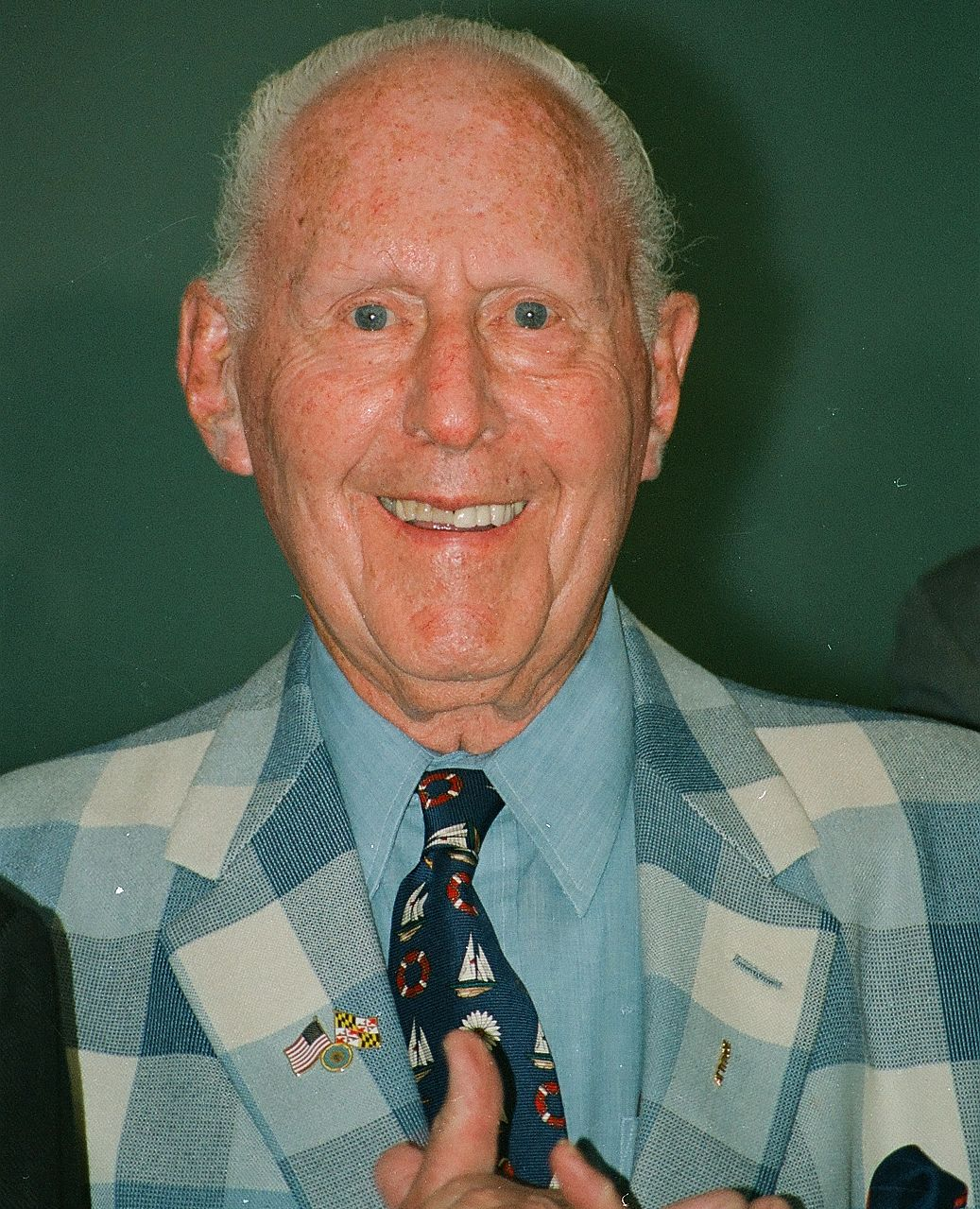
- Goldstein in 1996

Comptroller of Maryland
- In office January 3, 1959 – July 3, 1998
- Governor: See list: J. Millard Tawes Spiro Agnew Marvin Mandel Blair Lee III Harry Hughes William Donald Schaefer Parris Glendening
- Preceded by: J. Millard Tawes
- Succeeded by: Robert L. Swann

President of the Maryland State Senate
- In office 1955–1958
- Preceded by: George W. Della
- Succeeded by: George W. Della

Personal details
- Born: Louis Lazerus Goldstein; March 14, 1913 Prince Frederick, Maryland, U.S.
- Died: July 3, 1998 (aged 85) Calvert County, Maryland, U.S.
- Party: Democratic

Louis Lazerus Goldstein (March 14, 1913 – July 3, 1998) was an American politician who served as comptroller, or chief financial officer, of Maryland for ten terms from 1959 to 1998. A popular politician and lifelong Democrat, he was first elected to the Maryland House of Delegates in 1938 and served three terms in the Maryland Senate before winning election as Comptroller. He ran unsuccessfully for U.S. Senate in 1964.

== Early life ==
Goldstein was born in Prince Frederick, Maryland in Calvert County. His father Goodman Goldstein was a Jewish immigrant from Prussia who had settled in the rural area after he was assigned as a salesman to Calvert County by his first employer, a Baltimore retailer. Louis worked in his father's store in Prince Frederick until he left to attend Washington College in Chestertown, Maryland and later the University of Maryland, where he received his law degree in 1938. He was elected that year to the Maryland House of Delegates as a Democrat from Calvert County. Goldstein enlisted in the United States Marine Corps at the age of 29 following the Pearl Harbor attack and served in the Pacific. Commissioned as an officer from enlisted rank he reached 1st lieutenant. Following the surrender of Japan, he was a member of General Douglas MacArthur's staff that investigated Japanese war crimes in the Philippines.

== Political career ==
Returning to politics in 1946, Goldstein was elected to the Maryland Senate for the first of three terms. In the Senate, he was majority leader from 1951 to 1955 and President of the Senate from 1955 to 1958. In 1959 he was elected to the first of ten terms as Comptroller of Maryland. The politically powerful position entails membership on the Public Works Board with the governor and state treasurer, granting final authority over most state contracts and purchases. Goldstein ran for the United States Senate in 1964, losing in the Democratic primary to eventual Senator Joseph Tydings.

== Personal life, family, and death ==
Goldstein's father had significant landholdings in Calvert County, to which Louis added, eventually owning about 2,000 acres (810 ha). Some of this land was sold in 1967 to Baltimore Gas and Electric for the Calvert Cliffs Nuclear Power Plant at above-market prices, prompting criticism.

Goldstein married lawyer Hazel Horton in 1948, with whom he practiced law. They had two daughters and a son. Hazel died in 1996.

Goldstein died at his Calvert County home, Oakland Park, on July 3, 1998. The apparent cause of death was a heart attack.

== Political legacy ==
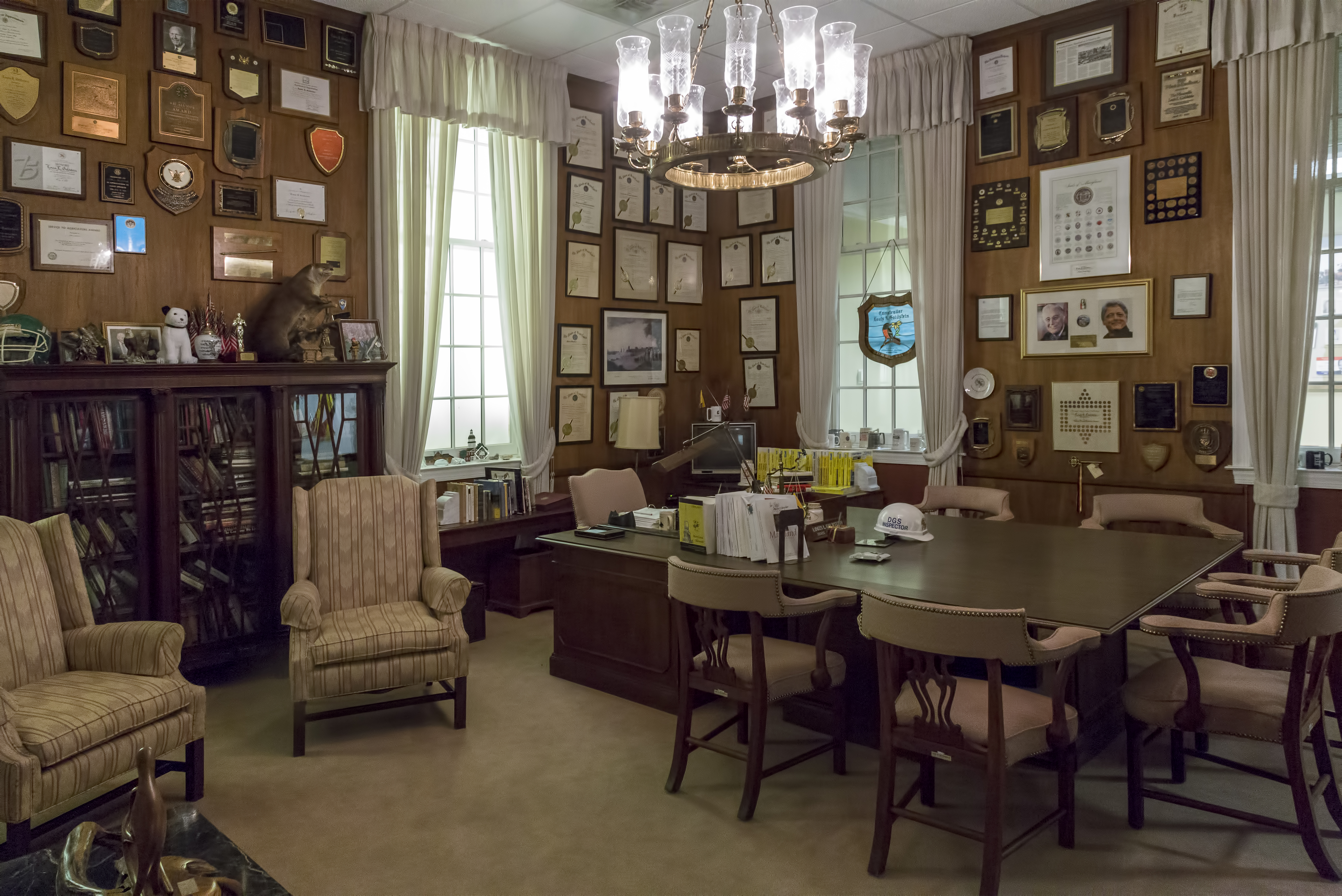
Goldstein's office at the Jefferson Patterson Museum

Goldstein served as a legislator in the General Assembly of Maryland, and allegedly also owned land in every county in the State of Maryland. He practiced law with his wife Hazel (1917–1996). The statue of Louis L. Goldstein, outside the Louis L. Goldstein Treasury Building in the state capital of Annapolis, was created by Jay Hall Carpenter and unveiled on April 3, 2002.

Goldstein Hall at his alma mater Washington College is named for him. The "Goldstein Award" at the college's annual commencement awards the graduate with the greatest potential for success in public service. All of Maryland Route 2/4 in Calvert County is named after Goldstein.

The Calvert County Democratic Party's annual dinner banquet is also named after Louis L. Goldstein. Goldstein deputy, Robert L. "Bobby" Swann was appointed Comptroller after Goldstein's death by then-governor Parris Glendening. Former four-term Mayor of Baltimore and two-term Governor William Donald Schaefer later ran for the office of Comptroller in November 1998. Goldstein had already announced he was running for another term before his death and would have almost certainly been re-elected even at age 85. Schaefer, tired of being out of public office, and still popular with a wide support among the electorate, won easily following Goldstein's death. Ironically, Schaefer and Goldstein sat on the Maryland Board of Public Works together when Goldstein was comptroller and Schaefer was governor. The two were not particularly close personally or professionally, although Goldstein was almost always gracious but tough at BPW meetings. Longtime Maryland Senate President Thomas V. (Mike) Miller, Jr., considered Goldstein one of the greatest politicians he had ever known. Goldstein rarely forgot a name or at least a face.

His Annapolis office was taken apart piece-by-piece after his death at the guidance of his longtime friend and deputy comptroller, Swann, and was replicated at the Jefferson Patterson Park and Museum located in St. Leonard, Maryland.

In addition, the Honorable Louis L. Goldstein Volunteer Police, Fire, Rescue, and Emergency Medical Services Personnel Subtraction Modification Program was enacted to honor his service.

Political offices
Preceded by George W. Della	President of the Maryland State Senate; 1955–1958	Succeeded by George W. Della
Preceded by J. Millard Tawes	Comptroller of Maryland; 1959–1998	Succeeded by Robert L. Swann
