= Comptroller of Maryland =

Chief financial officer for the U.S. state of Maryland

- Great Seal of the State of Maryland

- Flag of the State of Maryland

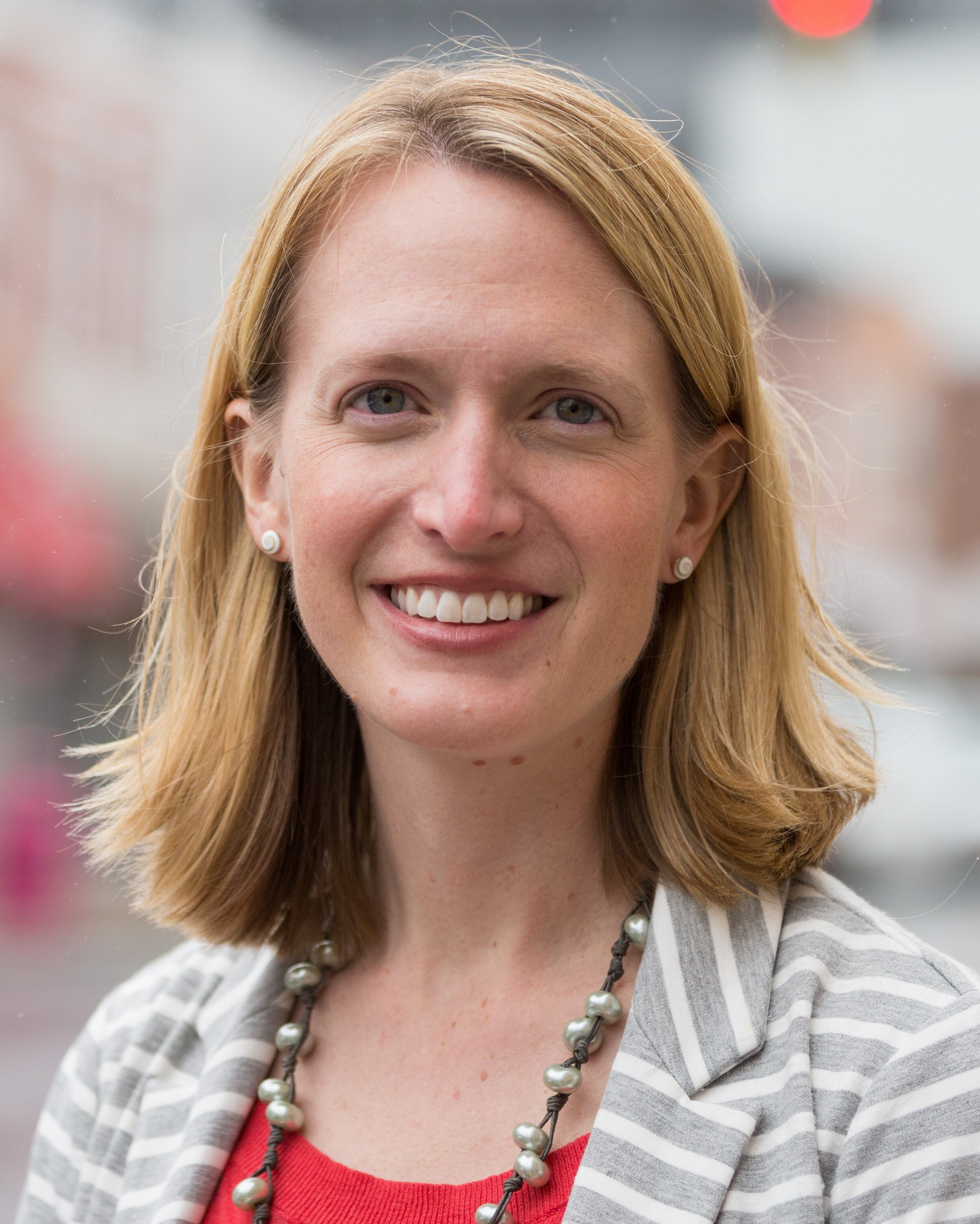
- Incumbent; Brooke Lierman since January 16, 2023
- Style: Mister or Madam Comptroller (informal); The Honorable (formal)
- Member of: Board of Public Works, among others
- Seat: Louis Goldstein Treasury Building; Annapolis, Maryland
- Appointer: General election
- Term length: Four years, no term limit
- Constituting instrument: Maryland Constitution of 1851
- Inaugural holder: Philip Francis Thomas
- Website: Official website

The comptroller of Maryland is a constitutional officer of the U.S. state of Maryland. Thirty-four individuals have held the office of comptroller since 1851, when the office was created. The incumbent is Brooke Lierman, a Democrat.

== Election and term of office ==
The comptroller is elected by the citizens of Maryland to a four-year term on Election Day in November, and takes office on the third Monday of the January next succeeding. There is no limit to the number of terms a comptroller may hold. Likewise, neither the Maryland Constitution nor the Annotated Code of Maryland prescribe any qualifications for the office, such as residency, age, or even citizenship requirements.

In the event of a vacancy in the office of comptroller, the governor may appoint a successor to serve the balance of the term. The comptroller may be removed from office by the General Assembly through impeachment. However, the comptroller cannot be recalled under Maryland law.

== Powers and duties ==
The comptroller's office was established by the second Maryland Constitution of 1851 due to concern for potential fraud and corruption in the administration of the public treasury. Pursuant to this mandate, the comptroller effectively functions as Maryland's chief financial officer. The constitutional duties of the office begin with the broad mandate to exercise "general superintendence of the fiscal affairs of the State", which includes maintaining the general ledger. To this end, the comptroller prescribes and operates the statewide accounting system, administers payroll to state employees, and prepares the state of Maryland's annual comprehensive financial report. As it concerns revenue administration, the comptroller collects taxes due to the state, conducts income and sales tax audits of taxpayers for compliance with state and local laws, processes tax returns, settles delinquent tax receipts, and enforces business licensing and unclaimed property laws. It is by virtue of the Disposition of Abandoned Property Act that the comptroller's office publicizes taxpayers' forgotten bank accounts, insurance benefits and other unclaimed assets. Likewise, the comptroller (or a deputy) draws all warrants for payment of money on the state treasury and countersigns all checks drawn by the state treasurer on state deposits. The comptroller also prescribes the formalities for transfer of evidences of state debt and countersigns such papers.

== List of comptrollers of Maryland ==
No.	Image	Name	Term	Party
1		Philip Francis Thomas	1851–1853	Democratic
2		Henry E. Bateman	1853–1854	Democratic
3		William Pinkney Whyte	1854–1856	Democratic
4		William Henry Purnell	1856–1861	Know Nothing
5		Dennis Claude	1861	Democratic
6		Abram Lingan Jarrett	1861–1862	Democratic
7		Samuel Snowden Maffit	1862–1864	National Union (previously Republican)
8		Henry Hollyday Goldsborough	1864	National Union (previously Republican)
9		Robert John Jump	1864–1867	National Union (previously Republican)
10		William James Leonard	1867–1870	Democratic
11		Levin Woolford	1870–1878	Democratic
12		Thomas James Keating	1878–1884	Democratic
13		J. Frank Turner	1884–1888	Democratic
14		L. Victor Baughman	1888–1892	Democratic
15		Marion deKalb Smith	1892–1896	Democratic
16		Robert Patterson Graham	1896–1898	Republican
17		Phillips Lee Goldsborough	1898–1900	Republican
18		Joshua W. Hering	1900–1904	Democratic
19		Gordon T. Atkinson	1904–1908	Democratic
20		Joshua W. Hering	1908–1910	Democratic
21		William B. Clagett	1910–1911	Democratic
22		Charles H. Stanley	1911–1912	Democratic
23		Emerson C. Harrington	1912–1916	Democratic
24		Hugh A. McMullen	1916–1920	Democratic
25		E. Brooke Lee	1920–1922	Democratic
26		William S. Gordy, Jr.	1922–1939	Democratic
27		J. Millard Tawes	1939–1947	Democratic
28		James J. Lacy	1947–1950	Democratic
29		J. Millard Tawes	1950–1959	Democratic
30		Louis L. Goldstein	1959–1998	Democratic
31		Robert L. Swann	1998–1999	Democratic
32		William Donald Schaefer	1999–2007	Democratic
33		Peter Franchot	2007–2023	Democratic
34		Brooke Lierman	2023–present	Democratic
