= Jesse Price (politician) =

American politician (1963–1939)

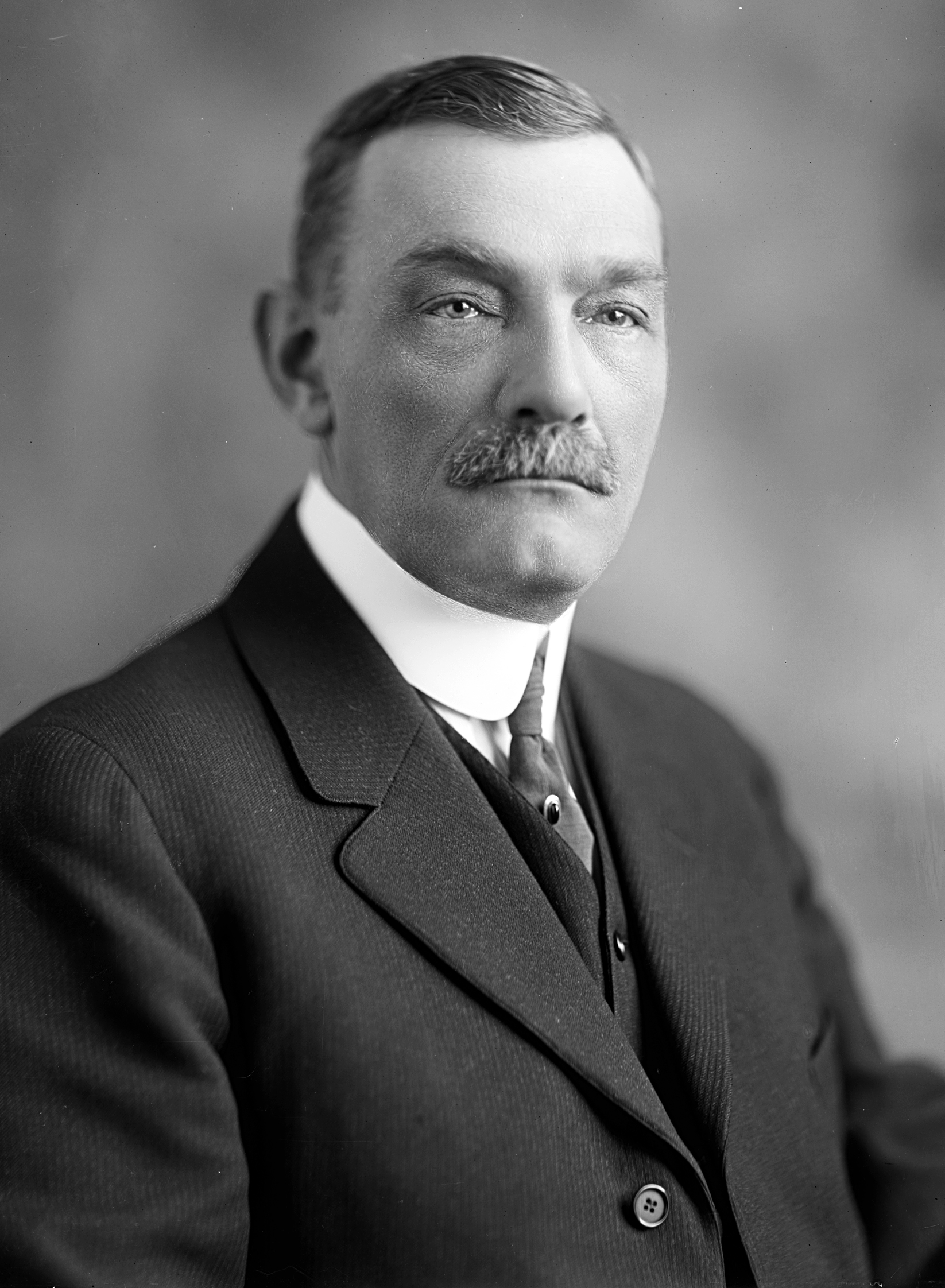
- Harris & Ewing portrait of Price, taken between 1905 and 1939

Member of the U.S. House of Representatives from Maryland's 1st district
- In office November 3, 1914 – March 3, 1919
- Preceded by: J. Harry Covington
- Succeeded by: William N. Andrews

Member of the Maryland Senate from the Wicomico County district
- In office 1908–1916

President of the Maryland Senate
- In office 1912–1916
- Preceded by: Arthur Pue Gorman Jr.
- Succeeded by: Peter J. Campbell

Personal details
- Born: Jesse Dashiell Price; August 15, 1863 Whitehaven, Maryland, US
- Died: May 14, 1939 (aged 75) Ocean City, Maryland, US
- Party: Democratic
- Occupation: Politician

Jesse Dashiell Price (August 15, 1863 – May 14, 1939) was an American politician. A Democrat, he was a member of the United States House of Representatives from Maryland.

== Early life and education ==
Price was born on August 15, 1863, in Whitehaven, Maryland, the only child born to merchant and educator Charles Wesley Price, and Martha Ann (née Dashiell) Price. Educated at local public schools and by private tutors, he later moved to Salisbury.

== Career ==
By 1887, Price owned a shoe company, later establishing an ice manufacturing company in 1900, and at some point a coal company. At times, he was president of the Wicomico Building and Loan Association, vice-president of the People's National Bank, and director of the Eastern Shore Gas & Electric Company.

Price was a Democrat. In 1903, he was a member of the Salisbury City Council, and from 1903 to 1907, was treasurer of Wicomico County. From 1908 to 1916, he represented Wicomico County in the Maryland Senate, serving as its president from 1912 to 1916, resigning to become a member of the United States House of Representatives. While in the Senate, he was a member of the committees on Contingent Expenses of the Senate, on Elections, on Federal Relations, on Finance, and on Printing.

Following the resignation of J. Harry Covington, Price was elected to the House. He was a member from either November 3, or December 7, 1914, to March 3, 1919, representing Maryland's 1st district. He lost the following election. Ideologically, he was liberal.

After serving in Congress, Price returned to working as a businessman. From 1923 to 1935, he was a member of the Maryland Tax Commission. He was vice-president of the Pine Bluff Sanitorium Commission.

== Personal life and death ==
On November 27, 1889, Price married Sallie B. Amiss, with whom he had a daughter. He was a member of the Methodist Episcopal Church, South, as well as a member of the Improved Order of Red Men, the Knights of the Maccabees, the Knights of Pythias, the Loyal Order of Moose, and the Royal Arcanum. He died on May 14, 1939, aged 75, in Ocean City, Maryland, and was buried at Parsons Cemetery, in Salisbury.

Political offices
Preceded by Arthur Pue Gorman Jr.	President of the Maryland State Senate; 1912–1914	Succeeded by Peter J. Campbell
U.S. House of Representatives
Preceded by J. Harry Covington	Member of the U.S. House of Representatives from Maryland's 1st congressional district 1914–1919	Succeeded by William N. Andrews
