= Neavitt, Maryland =

Unincorporated community in Maryland, United States

- Unincorporated community
- Location within Maryland
- Coordinates: 38°43′28″N 76°16′57″W
- Country: United States
- State: Maryland
- County: Talbot
- Elevation: 7 ft (2.1 m)
- Time zone: UTC-5 (Eastern (EST))
  - Summer (DST): UTC-4 (EDT)
- ZIP code: 21652
- Area codes: 410, 443, and 667
- GNIS feature ID: 590866

Neavitt is an unincorporated community in Talbot County, Maryland, United States. It is located on a peninsula at the southern terminus of Maryland Route 579 on the north bank of the Choptank River, southwest of St. Michaels and northeast of Tilghman Island.

Originating on land granted to Quaker colonists in the 17th century, Neavitt emerged as a small agricultural and fishing community during the mid-19th century. Following the establishment of several community institutions and services by the 1880s, many by the local Neavitt family that gave the community its name, Neavitt attracted commercial activities that had arisen throughout the Eastern Shore in the late 19th and early 20th centuries, most notably oystering and canning. Its proximity to the Baltimore, Chesapeake and Atlantic Railway (BC&A) and its steamboat network brought further investment, infrastructure, and tourism from metropolitan areas such as Washington, Baltimore, and Philadelphia.

Following the closure of BC&A rail service in 1931 and the decline of its industries after World War II, Neavitt became the focus of greater tourism and settlement by retirees from around the region, particularly after the opening of the Chesapeake Bay Bridge in 1952. Several large farms were subdivided in the 1950s and 1960s in anticipation of further development, which occurred throughout the rest of the 20th century. Today, Neavitt remains a small village that continues to attract retirees, vacationers, and local watermen that engage in crabbing, oystering, and fishing.

== History ==
=== Native American settlement and colonial era ===
Neavitt and its surrounding region has been inhabited by humans since the arrival of the Paleo-Indians over 11,000 years ago. Paw Paw Cove Site, a Paleo-Indian archaeological site on nearby Tilghman Island discovered in 1979, has produced artifacts including fluted points and tools dating between 11,500 and 10,500 years before present. The Choptank, an Algonquian-speaking people, inhabited the Choptank River system prior to the establishment of the Province of Maryland by England in 1632. The English colonial government moved all tribes, including the Choptank, onto reservations by the end of the 17th century, and by the mid-18th century most of the Eastern Shore's Native American population had left due to encroachment by colonists.

The first colonial land grant in present-day Neavitt was acquired by Ralph Elston Sr., an English Quaker, in 1661. Elston eventually expanded his "Long Point" parcel, which originally consisted of 50 acres at the end of the Neavitt peninsula between Harris and Broad Creeks, in 1673 to include 180 additional acres of Long Neck. The property, which was called Elston Point, likely contained a house built by Elston shortly after his land was surveyed.

Long Point House in Spring 1978

Elston, a widower, married widow Mary Ball in 1694; Mary's husband, John Ball, had died between 1686 and 1693. The Balls, also Quakers, were an Anglo-Irish family that had migrated to Maryland from Dungannon, County Tyrone in April 1686. While Elston Point was eventually sold out of the family in 1705, Mary's son from her first marriage, Benjamin Ball, eventually repurchased it and sold it to his brother Thomas Ball. In 1720, Thomas built a house along Balls Creek on the foundations of Ralph Elston's building, which he named Long Point. The structure, a gambrel roof brick dwelling and the oldest building in Neavitt, is still extant. A wharf off of the Long Point estate was used to transport tobacco to the nearby port of Oxford, which Thomas had helped establish in 1694.

The Ball family expanded their landholdings in Talbot County throughout the 18th century, and eventually became involved in shipbuilding, for which they used enslaved labor and indentured servants. They worshipped and participated in Talbot County's Quaker society at the Third Haven Meeting House in Easton. In 1799, Rachel Ball and her husband William Shield put Long Point up for sale, ultimately selling it to Joseph Harrison in 1803.

Other early residents during the colonial period included the Haddaways, who first received a land grant in the Neavitt area in 1678. The family built Lancashire, a 1 1/2-story brick structure, on the property around 1783. Located near the southeast corner of Bozman-Neavitt Road and Neavitt Manor Road, this house was the birthplace and boyhood home of Joseph B. Seth, a Maryland politician, businessman, and Haddaway family descendent, during the mid-19th century.

=== Early development ===
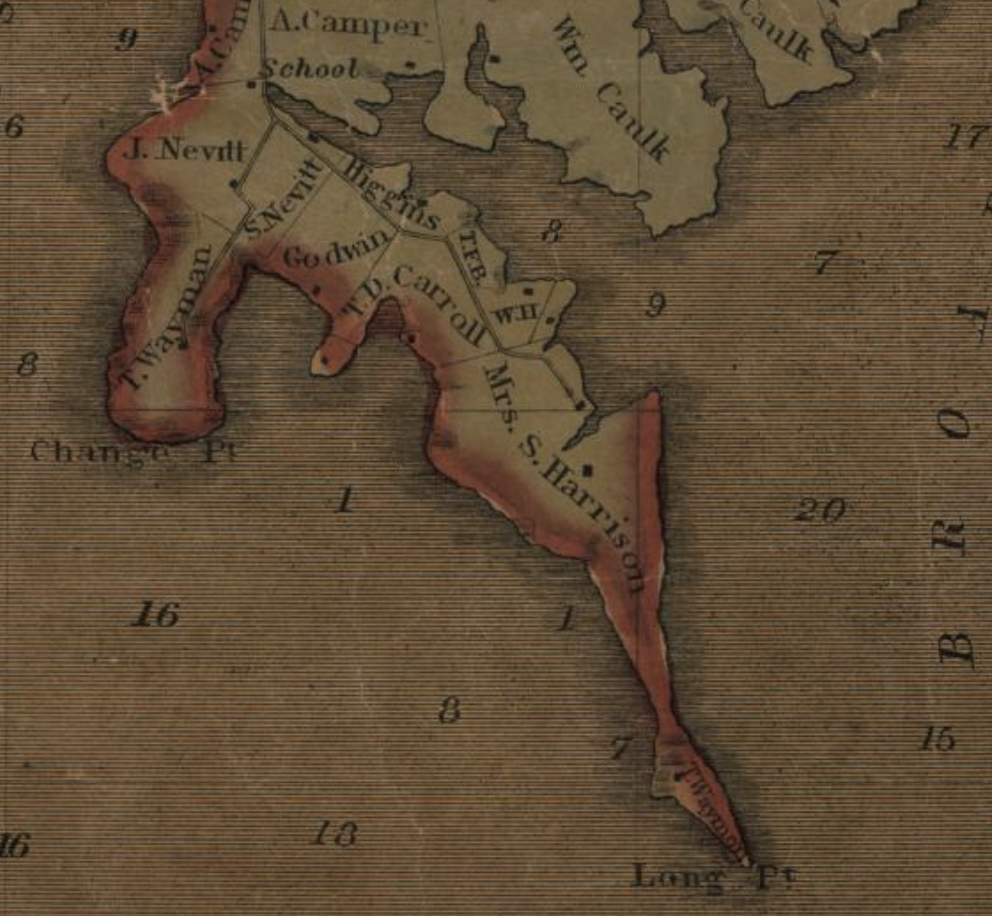
1858 map of Neavitt area. Properties of families such as the Neavitts and the community schoolhouse are visible

Inhabitants of surrounding areas began congregating in the Broad Creek Neck section of Neavitt peninsula in the early 19th century, and by 1858 a one-room schoolhouse was established. The Neavitt family participated in the establishment of the growing community's organizations and services during this period, including the Neavitt United Methodist Church, which was originally founded by Edward Neavitt in 1856 as "Chatham Chapel". The congregation later built a church building in 1868, which was enlarged in 1888. Henry C. Neavitt, who also ran a grocery store across from the church's cemetery, served as its first postmaster in 1862. The post office, originally called Broad Creek Neck, was renamed to Neavitt on May 25, 1880, and daily postal service from St. Michaels began in 1888.

Beginning in the 1880s, Neavitt's watermen began building homes in the village's southeastern section along Duck Cove. Houses originally located along the Choptank River were likely moved here during the 1890s due to erosion of the shoreline, and by the close of the 19th century Neavitt concentrated in this area, which hosted around five stores. The 1920s saw the construction of a village hall and post office by the Knights of Pythias, a fraternal organization based in Washington, the relocation of the Neavitt Methodist Church closer to Duck Cove, and the establishment of a new school building. Neavitt's school eventually burned down in 1941 and was not rebuilt. By 1938, Works Progress Administration's Rural Electrification Project brought electricity to Neavitt.

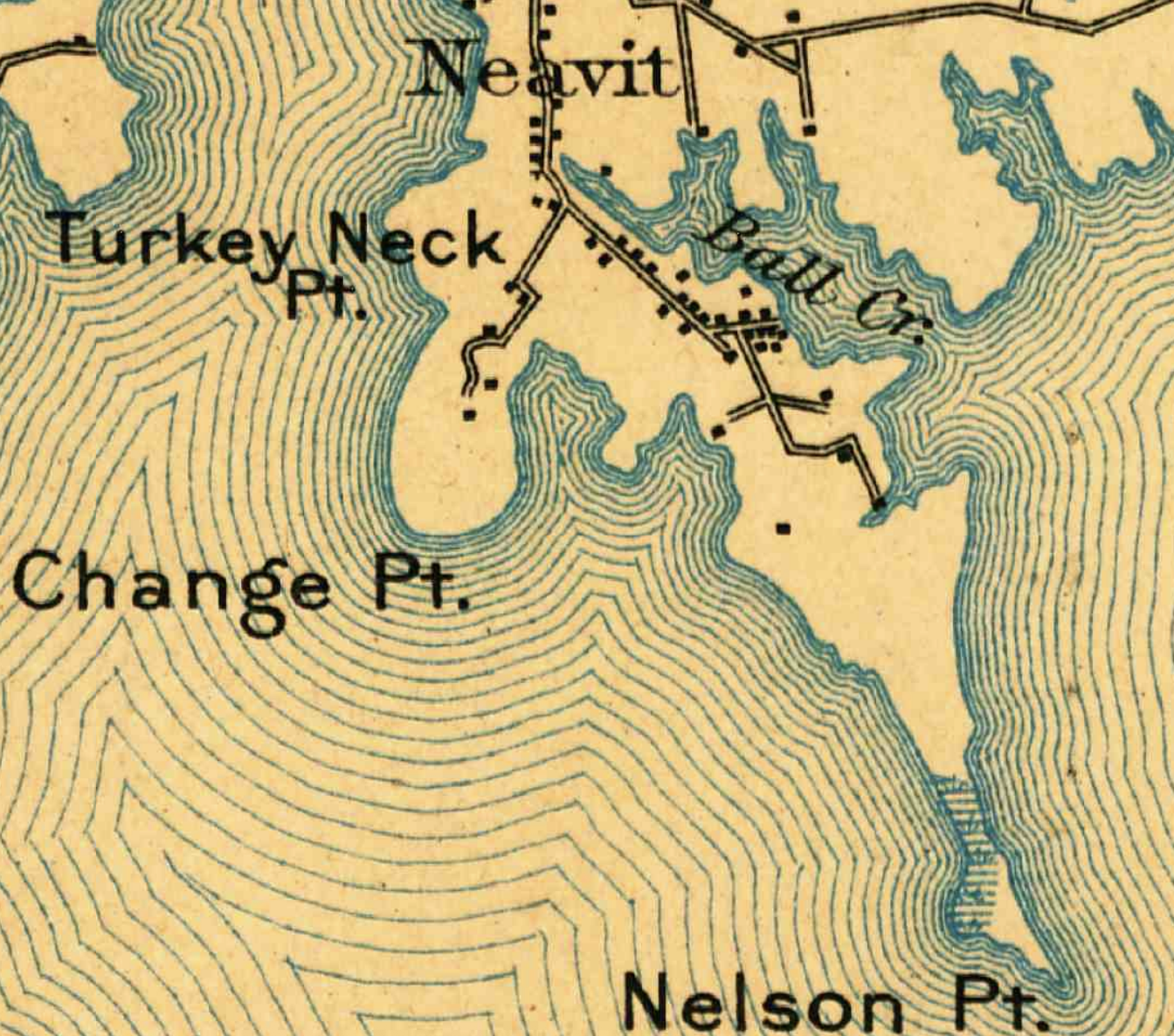
1898 map of Neavitt. Black squares represent buildings

=== Commercial growth ===
Beyond agriculture, residents of Neavitt found employment in the Eastern Shore's rising fishing and canning industries. The Ball family operated an oyster packing plant at present-day Neavitt Landing, and two canneries were located on Bozman-Neavitt Road and Broad Creek Neck. Freight boats would regularly dock at Neavitt's steamboat wharf, built in 1900 by the Baltimore, Chesapeake and Atlantic Railway (BC&A), to deliver supplies from Maryland's Western Shore and pick up Neavitt's produce, wheat, and seafood. During World War II, canneries across the Chesapeake produced rations for the armed forces, further stimulating the industry.

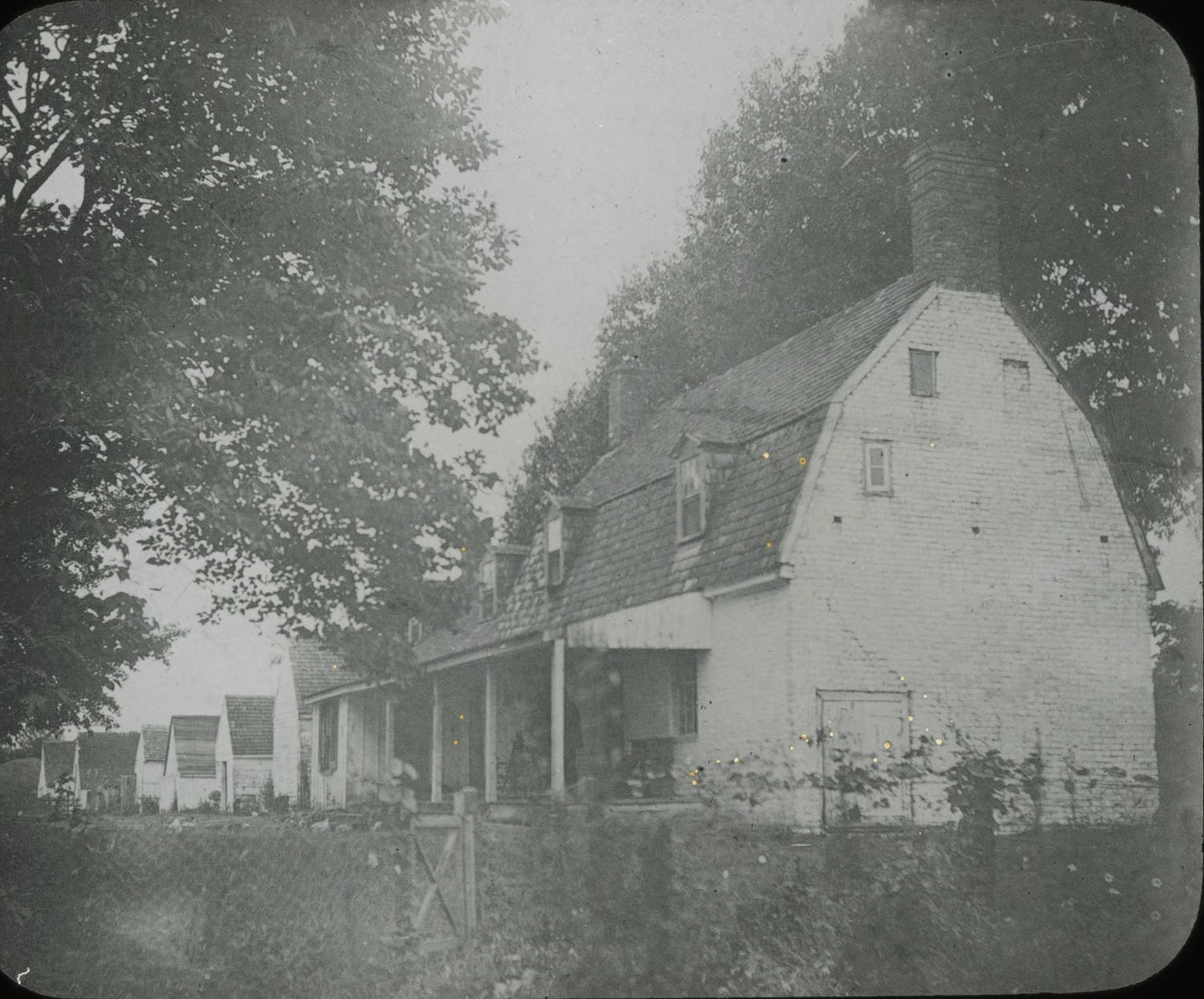
Long Point House when it served as a lodge for visiting hunters. The lodge buildings, positioned adjacent to the house, burned before 1926

From the late 19th century until 1931, the BC&A provided rail service between Claibourne and Ocean City; it also controlled a series of steamboat lines. This infrastructure enabled Neavitt and other villages in Talbot County to become popular destinations for vacationers by the early 20th century, who would travel from cities such as Baltimore via rail, ferries to Love Point in Kent Island, and horse and carriage. Local residents supplanted their income by making rooms available for boarding to tourists, who could stay for weeks or months at a time. The du Pont family of Delaware also established a presence in the vicinity of Neavitt after William du Pont Jr. purchased the 1000-acre Pleasure Point farm in 1900, which he used as a hunting range.

=== Industrial decline and recent history ===
With the broader decline in the Eastern Shore's fisheries and canneries due to decades of overexploitation, environmental degradation, loss of government contracts in the post-war era, and rising wages, Neavitt's economy began shifting towards greater residential development to attract vacationers and retirees. This was facilitated by the completion of the Chesapeake Bay Bridge in 1952, which drastically reduced commute times from the Washington and Baltimore metropolitan areas. In anticipation of this, Long Point Farm was subdivided into the Elston Shores subdivision by the Balazs in 1951, which consisted of 21 10-acre lots. Part of the Neavitt family's Middle Point Farm property was also converted into the Neavitt Manor subdivision in 1966.

Neavitt experienced significant flooding during Hurricane Isabel in September 2003 that severely damaged its old post office building, which was forced to close shortly after. The United States Postal Service considered permanently shuttering Neavitt's post office in 2006, but eventually changed course after several community organizations raised more than $125,000 to build a new post office in the Neavitt Community Park. More than half was given by Jean Ellen du Pont Shehan, daughter of William Jr., who had earlier donated a majority of the Pleasure Point property to the Audubon Society as a nature preserve. The new building was dedicated on November 23, 2007.

In 2018, the Talbot County Council approved a resolution to build a sewer line connecting Bozman and Neavitt to a water treatment plant in St. Michaels. This had instigated concern among residents regarding potential development following the completion of the sewer and any threat that would present to the area's rural character. The line was originally projected to be complete by 2021; it is currently planned to be fully operational by the end of 2025.

The community retains numerous buildings from the 19th and early 20th centuries, including homes featuring simplified Queen Anne, Greek Revival, Colonial Revival, Gothic Revival, and American Craftsman ornamentation. Many are vernacular structures built in the I-house, bungalow, and Cape Cod layouts. The c. 1858 Neavitt schoolhouse, which has been converted to a private residence, still stands on its original location along Bozman-Neavitt Road. After years of declining membership, the Neavitt United Methodist Church closed in 2023, concluding over 160 years in the community.

== Geography ==
Neavitt is located on a peninsula with around 8 miles of shoreline that extends into Broad Creek and the Choptank River. It is bordered by Harris Creek to the west and Balls Creek to the east. The community of Bozman is located directly north of Neavitt along Bozman-Neavitt Road. The closest incorporated town is St. Michaels, which is situated northeast of Neavitt along Maryland Route 33.

== Infrastructure ==
Maryland Route 579 passes directly through Neavitt, and provides access to Maryland Route 33. Neavitt Landing, which has been built on the original location of the old BC&A steamboat wharf, has slips that are used by local watermen and pleasure boaters.

== Parks and recreation ==
The Neavitt Community Park, located in the center of Neavitt on Bozman-Neavitt Road, contains a pavilion, a playground, a baseball field, and a basketball court. The park periodically hosts a flea market organized by the Neavitt Community Association. The post office building near the park hosts regular community meetings, events, lectures, and classes.

== Bibliography ==
- Bourne, Michael (April 1977). National Register of Historic Places Registration Form - Long Point or Elston (PDF). Annapolis: Maryland Historic Trust.
- Culver, Francis B. (1945). "Ball of Bayside, Talbot County, Maryland" (PDF). Maryland Historical Magazine. 40 (2): 154–164.
- Farris, Lorin; Lytle, Melanie; Whitton, Kelly (January 7, 2017). Maryland Historic Trust Maryland Inventory of Historic Properties Form - Neavitt Survey District (PDF). Talbot County Department of Planning and Zoning.
- Talbot County Department of Planning and Zoning (August 2016). Neavitt Village Plan (PDF). Easton: County of Talbot, Maryland.

== See also ==
- Bozman, Maryland
- St. Michaels, Maryland
- Easton, Maryland
