= 1911 Maryland gubernatorial election =

- November 7, 1911
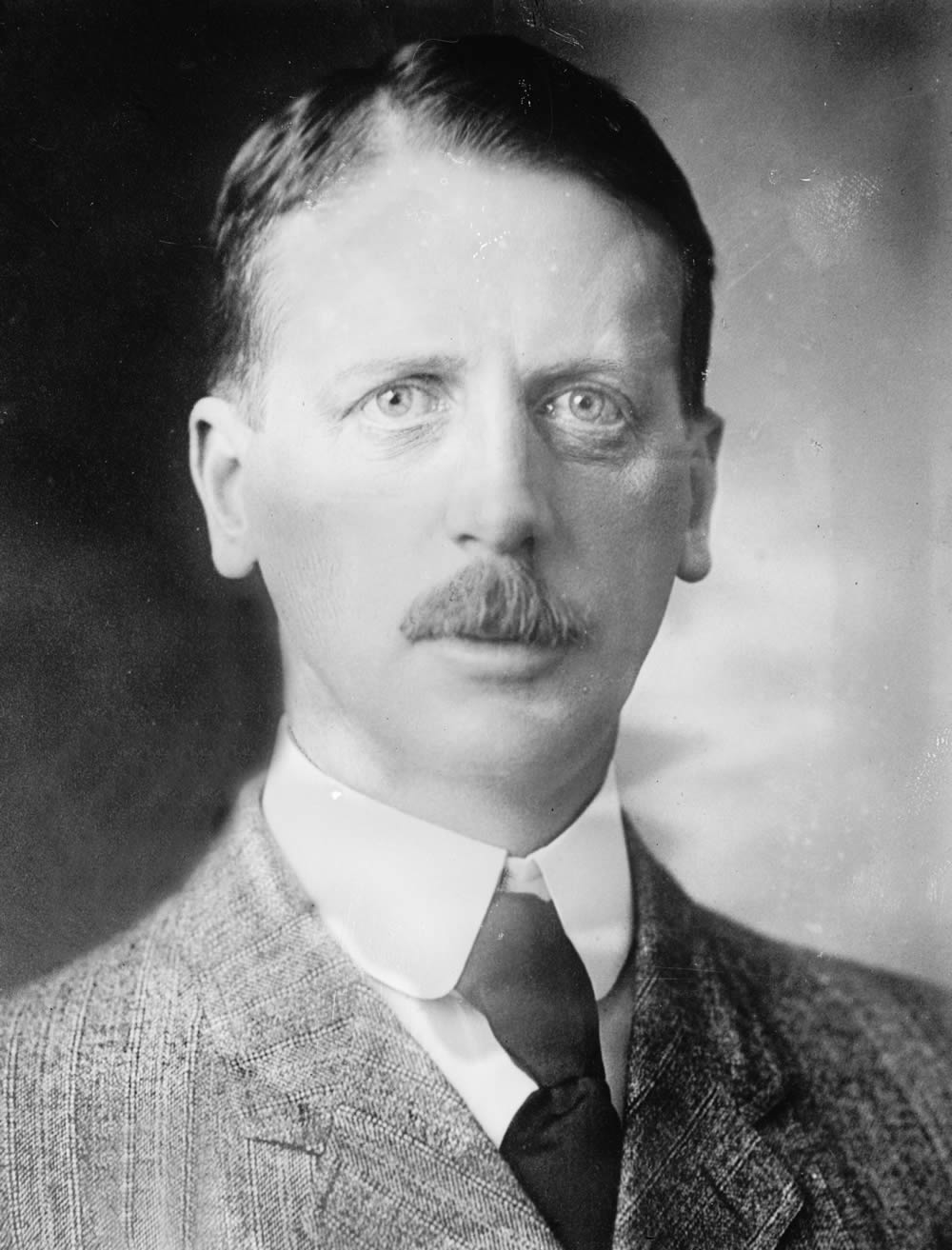

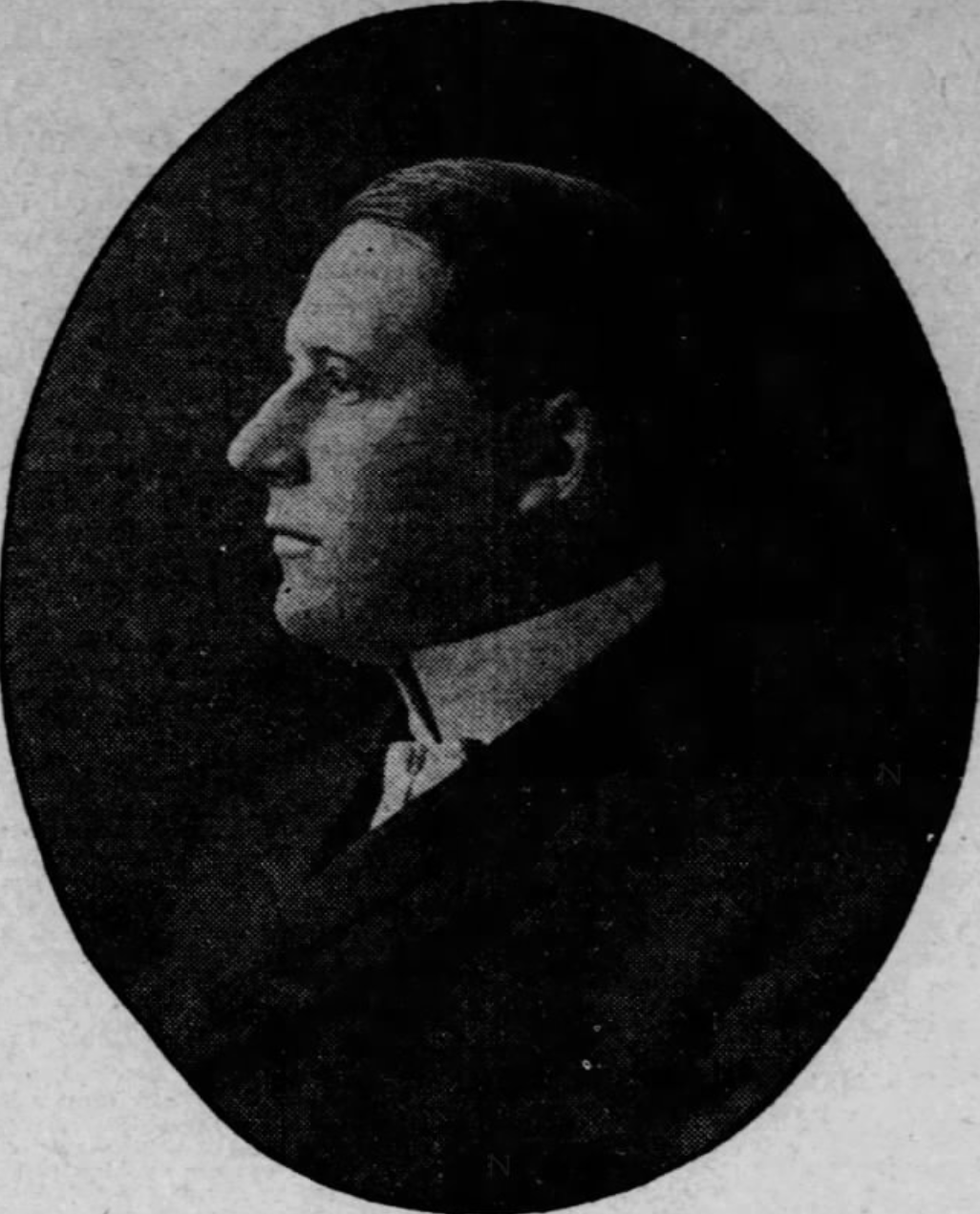
Nominee	Phillips Lee Goldsborough	Arthur Pue Gorman Jr.
Party	Republican	Democratic
Popular vote	106,392	103,395
Percentage	49.26%	47.88%
- County results Goldsborough: 40–50% 50–60% 60–70% Gorman: 40–50% 50–60%
Governor before election
Austin Lane Crothers
Democratic
Elected Governor
Phillips Lee Goldsborough
Republican

The 1911 Maryland gubernatorial election took place on November 7, 1911.

Incumbent Governor Austin Lane Crothers did not seek re-election.

Republican candidate Phillips Lee Goldsborough defeated Democratic candidate Arthur Pue Gorman Jr.; Goldsborough was the second Republican governor of Maryland since the end of Reconstruction. The Digges Amendment, which attempted to disenfranchise African Americans in Maryland, was concurrently defeated.

== General election ==
=== Candidates ===
- Phillips Lee Goldsborough, Republican, former Comptroller of Maryland
- Arthur Pue Gorman Jr., Democratic, incumbent President of the Maryland Senate
- Charles E. Devlin, Socialist
- John H. Dulany, Prohibition, farmer

=== Results ===
1911 Maryland gubernatorial election (Note: OurCampaigns omits Devlin and Dulany as candidates.)
Party	Candidate	Votes	%	±%
Republican	Phillips Lee Goldsborough	106,392	49.26%	
Democratic	Arthur Pue Gorman Jr.	103,395	47.88%	
Socialist	Charles E. Devlin	3,783	1.75%	
Prohibition	John H. Dulany	2,397	1.11%	
Majority		2,997	1.38%	
Turnout		215,967	100.00%	
Republican gain from Democratic		Swing		
