= Digges Amendment =

Failed Maryland state constitutional amendment

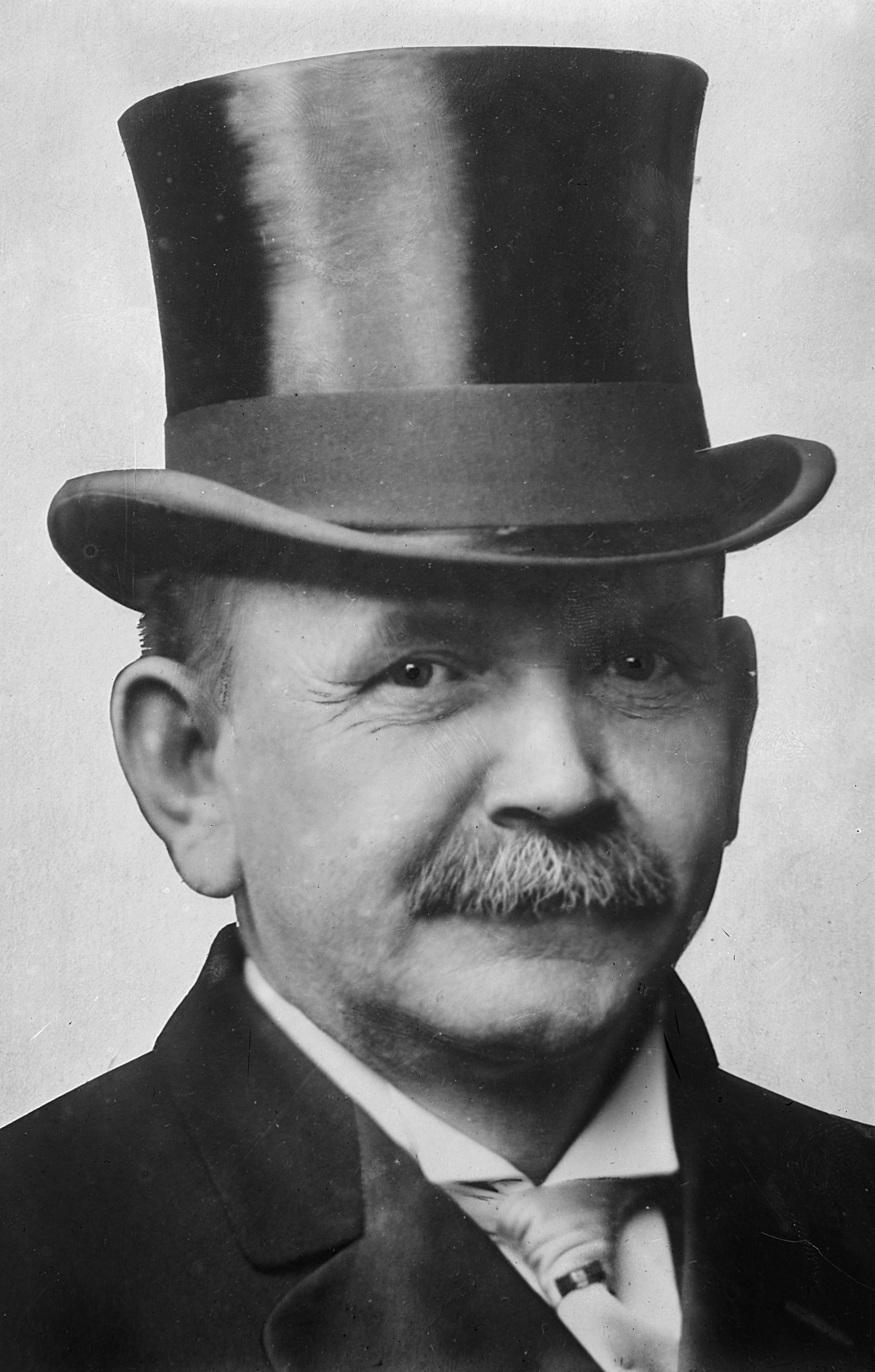
Democratic Governor Austin Lane Crothers (1908-1912) supported the Digges Amendment.

The Digges Amendment was an amendment to the Maryland Constitution, proposed in 1910, to curtail the Fifteenth Amendment of the United States Constitution and disenfranchise black voters in the state with the use of a property requirement. It was an initiative by predominately white conservative Democratic Party members in the state.

The amendment was drafted by Democratic state delegate (lower house) Walter Digges and co-sponsored by state senator (upper house) William J. Frere, both from Charles County, Maryland. The proposal was passed by the Democratic-dominated Maryland General Assembly and approved by Governor Austin Lane Crothers but was not ratified by the required general election voter referendum.

The Digges Amendment, if ratified, would have granted the right to vote for all white male citizens over the age of 21. All other men had to prove ownership and taxes on a minimum of $500 worth of property for two previous consecutive years. Along with the introduction of this amendment and before the general election referendum of 1911, the Maryland General Assembly also attempted to pass a temporary voter registration law that would limit the votes from black-majority counties. This law was vetoed by the Governor due to popular opposition, as African Americans were politically active and fought this law. All male Marylanders continued to have the chance to vote in the election.

In Maryland's unrestricted general election of 1911, the Digges Amendment was defeated with 46,220 votes for and 83,920 votes against the proposal. Nationally Maryland citizens achieved the most notable rejection of a black-disfranchising amendment. The power of black men at the ballot box and economically helped them resist this disfranchising effort.

== History ==
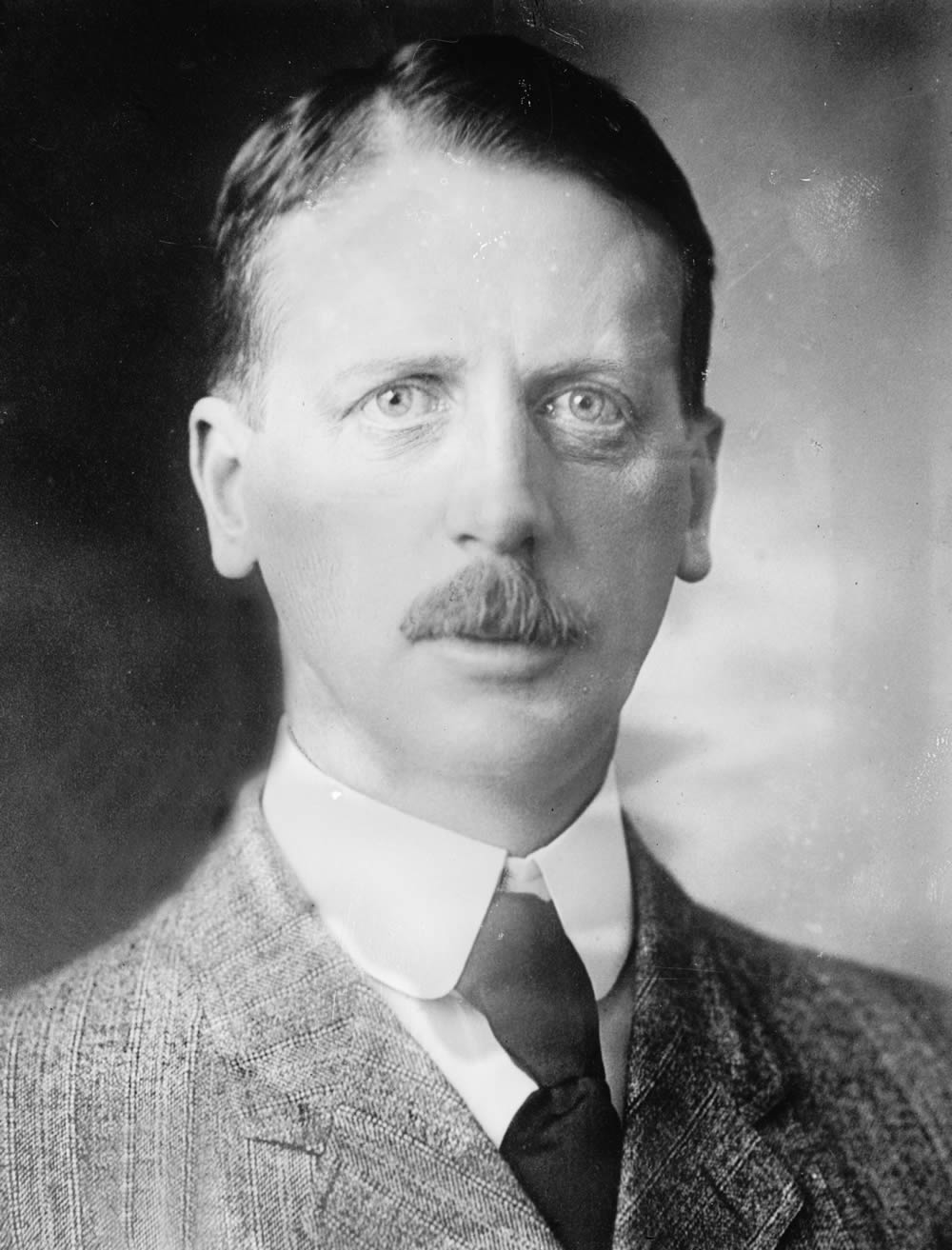
Republican Phillips Lee Goldsborough was elected governor in 1911.

After a brief period of Republican control in Maryland from 1896 to 1900 during the tenure of governor Lloyd Lowndes Jr., when the party was supported by many African Americans, Democrats regained control of the government on a white supremacist platform. They responded to the election of African-American Republican politicians in municipal and state offices. Black men comprised 20% of the electorate, while immigrant men comprised 15% of the voting population, and both opposed these measures. The legislature had difficulty devising requirements against blacks that did not also disadvantage immigrants. Because most of these poor and Catholic immigrant voters voted Democratic, Democrats were risking disenfranchising their own voters if they passed a disenfranchisement law. A grandfather clause would not have helped these immigrant voters to continue voting, because neither they nor their fathers or grandfathers had been present in the US before Reconstruction. The Democrats made three separate attempts to amend the Maryland Constitution so as to disenfranchise the black votes: the Poe Amendment of 1905, the Strauss Amendment of 1908-1909 and the Digges Amendment of 1910-1911. All three of the proposals were subsequently defeated by voter referendums. These disenfrancisement attempts may have in fact contributed to Republican victories in Maryland in 1901, since Republicans reportedly had more success in teaching illiterate black voters how to read a ballot than Democrats had in teaching illiterate immigrant voters how to read a ballot. In order to avoid disenfrachising their own immigrant voters, Democrats came up with a new idea in 1910, which was to pass a disenfranchisement law that explicitly would exempt white voters.

Maryland did not ratify the Fifteenth Amendment in 1870. Digges and Frere, both from the Republican stronghold of Charles County, argued that the amendment provisions did not apply at the state level. The Digges plan was opposed by Southern leaders, who were concerned that such extreme and blatant challenge to the Fifteen Amendment would undermine their own legal attempts underway to circumvent the enfranchisement of black votes. Beginning with Mississippi in 1890, most Southern states had passed new constitutions and other laws that made voter registration more difficult and effectively disenfranchised most blacks.

The Democratic gubernatorial nominee Arthur Pue Gorman Jr. lost to Republican Phillips Lee Goldsborough by a close 1.38% margin in the 1911 Maryland gubernatorial election. Goldsborough became the second Republican governor of Maryland since the end of Reconstruction.

== See also ==
- History of Maryland
- Solid South
- Disenfranchisement after the Reconstruction era
- List of governors of Maryland
- Redeemers
