= George W. Della =

American politician (1908–1990)

George W. Della (February 9, 1908 – August 11, 1990) was a politician and businessman from the U.S. state of Maryland. Trained as a lawyer, Della was appointed to the Maryland Senate in 1939 to represent a southern and southwestern district in Baltimore and served until his retirement from politics. He served as President of the Maryland Senate, (the upper chamber of the General Assembly of Maryland) from 1951 to 1955 and again from 1959 to 1963. Della was a member of the Democratic Party.

Following his retirement in 1963, The elder Della worked as a lobbyist for the local utility, the Baltimore Gas & Electric Company (now currently renamed part of the larger Constellation Energy, part of regional utility Exelon).

His son, George W. Della, Jr., was a member of the Baltimore City Council from 1976 to 1983 for the old 6th councilmanic district and also subsequently elected to the Maryland Senate also representing South and Southwestern Baltimore city (the same area as his father) from 1983 to 2010.

== Biography ==
George W. Della was born February 9, 1908, in Baltimore, Maryland. He attained his education locally, attending Baltimore Public Schools and the Baltimore City College, from which he graduated in 1927. He went on to earn a Bachelor of Arts degree in Business Administration from the University of Baltimore in 1932 and, three years later, earned a law degree from that institution's School of Law. By 1936, Della had passed the Maryland Bar and begun to practice law, and the same year he was wed to Agnes H. Mattare, with whom he had three children, George, Mary, and Howard.

As a lifelong resident of Baltimore, Della was active in a number of community organizations. He was a member of South Baltimore's Episcopal Church of the Advent (on South Charles Street below East Ostend Street) and of the Baltimore Country Club in Roland Park of north Baltimore.

He was also a Director of the American Bankers Life Insurance Company of Florida and the old South Baltimore General Hospital (founded 1914, then on South Light Street, relocated further south in 1968 to South Hanover Street waterfront by Broening / Middle Branch Park, and later renamed Harbor Hospital Center).

Della was also a long-time member of the Freemasons. In 1959 the Boumi Temple of the Shrine, part of the Freemason organization commonly referred to as the Shriners, made him potentate.

In 1939, then Governor of Maryland Herbert R. O'Conor appointed Della to the Maryland Senate as the Senator from then Baltimore's old 6th district. He served in a variety of leadership roles, including as Chair of the Insurance and Loans Committee and the Judicial Proceedings Committee. After 12 years, Della was elected to serve as President of the Maryland Senate in 1951, and continued in that role for four years until 1955. Four years later in 1959, he was again elected President, a position which he did not relinquish again until his retirement after this second period of four years in 1963.

Following his retirement, Della was hired as a lobbyist in 1967 by the Baltimore Gas and Electric Company, (now Constellation Energy, part of the larger regional utility conglomerate Exelon).

He continued to play a role in Maryland politics, most prominently as a delegate to the called state constitutional convention in 1967 to present a revised fifth Maryland state constitution to replace the fourth and current Constitution of Maryland of 1867 (which was defeated, but many of its provisions were enacted by the early 1970s under Governor Marvin Mandel).

Della retired in 1985, and died in 1990. His son George W. Della, Jr. followed in his father's footsteps, winning election as a Senator from Baltimore's 47th district in 1983 and remaining state Senator in a redistricted 46th district in 2003 until his Democratic Party primary defeat after 28 years in the upper chamber at the Maryland State House in September 2010.
