= Joseph B. Seth =

American politician and businessman (1845–1927)

Joseph Bruff Seth
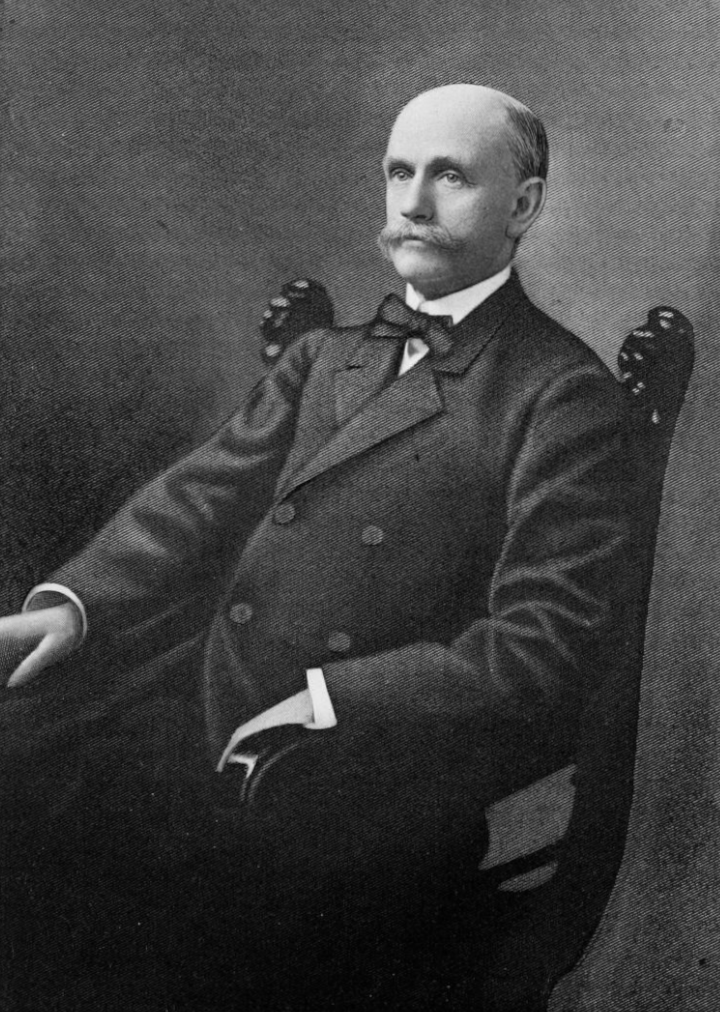

President of the Maryland Senate
- In office 1906–1908
- Preceded by: Spencer Cone Jones
- Succeeded by: Arthur Pue Gorman Jr.

Member of the Maryland Senate
- In office 1906–1908

Speaker of the Maryland House of Delegates
- In office 1886
- Preceded by: Joseph Pembroke Thom
- Succeeded by: George M. Upshur

Member of the Maryland House of Delegates
- In office 1874, 1884–1886

Personal details
- Born: November 25, 1845 Neavitt, Maryland, U.S.
- Died: November 23, 1927 (aged 81) Easton, Maryland, U.S.
- Party: Democratic
- Spouse(s): Sallie Goldsborough Barnett (m. 1878; died 1881) Mary Rhett Walker (m. 1892)
- Children: 1
- Parent: Alexander Hamilton Seth (father)
- Occupation: Politician; business executive; lawyer
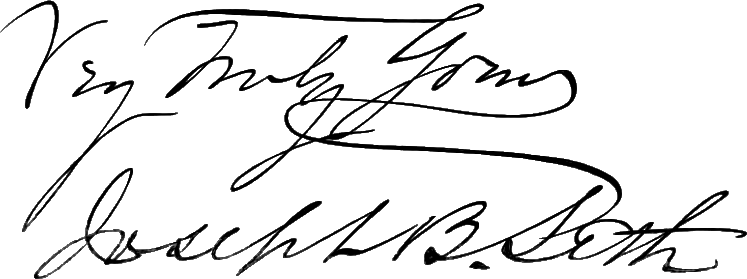
- Signature

Joseph Bruff Seth (November 25, 1845 – November 23, 1927) was an American politician, lawyer and business executive. He served in the Maryland House of Delegates in 1874 and from 1884 to 1886. In 1886, he served as Speaker of the Maryland House of Delegates. Seth served in the Maryland Senate and as President of the Maryland Senate from 1906 to 1908.

== Early life ==
Joseph Bruff Seth was born on November 25, 1845, in present-day Neavitt, Maryland, to Martha A. (née Haddaway) and Alexander Hamilton Seth. His father was a farmer and served in the Maryland House of Delegates in 1844. Seth was educated in public schools and grew up on the Lancashire farm built by the Haddaway family in the late 18th century. In 1860, Seth attended a boarding school, but returned home in 1861 due to the American Civil War and was tutored privately. In 1865, Seth worked with his uncle, Robert L. Seth, in the oyster and fruit packing business. Seth was admitted to the bar in 1867.

== Career ==
Seth joined the law firm of John M. Frazier in Baltimore. After the death of Frazier in 1870, Seth, his brother T. Alexander Seth and Harry E. Mann conducted a law firm. In 1871, Seth returned to Talbot County and practiced law in the courts there.

Seth was a Democrat. Seth served in the Maryland House of Delegates in 1874 and from 1884 to 1886. He served as Speaker of the Maryland House of Delegates in 1886. Seth served in the Maryland Senate from 1906 to 1908. He served as the President of the Maryland Senate from 1906 to 1908.

In 1884, Seth was appointed by Governor Robert M. McLane as Judge Advocate General. He was re-appointed by Governors Lloyd and Jackson. In 1890, Seth was appointed as Commander of the State Fishery Force and held that position until July 1903.

Seth organized and served as the first president of the Baltimore and Eastern Shore Railway. He served as manager of the railway for six years. He also helped obtain a charter for the emergency hospital in Easton, and served as president of the hospital's organization for seven years. In 1890, Seth joined a group that organized an electric light plant in Annapolis. He was elected as president, and also served as director of the Annapolis Short Line Railroad.

Seth served as mayor of Easton, Maryland from 1914 to 1916. Seth was in favor of Prohibition. Seth was also instrumental to the dedication of the Talbot Boys Confederate monument in 1916, and expressed sympathies for the Confederate cause and slavery.

== Personal life ==
Seth married Sallie Goldsborough Barnett on December 10, 1878. She died in August 1881. They had one son, John Barnett Seth. Seth married Mary Rhett Walker in June 1892.

In 1881, Seth purchased the Bromwell farm in Oxford Neck, Talbot County.

Seth died on November 23, 1927, at his home in Easton.
