= Bill Ferguson (politician) =

American politician (born 1983)

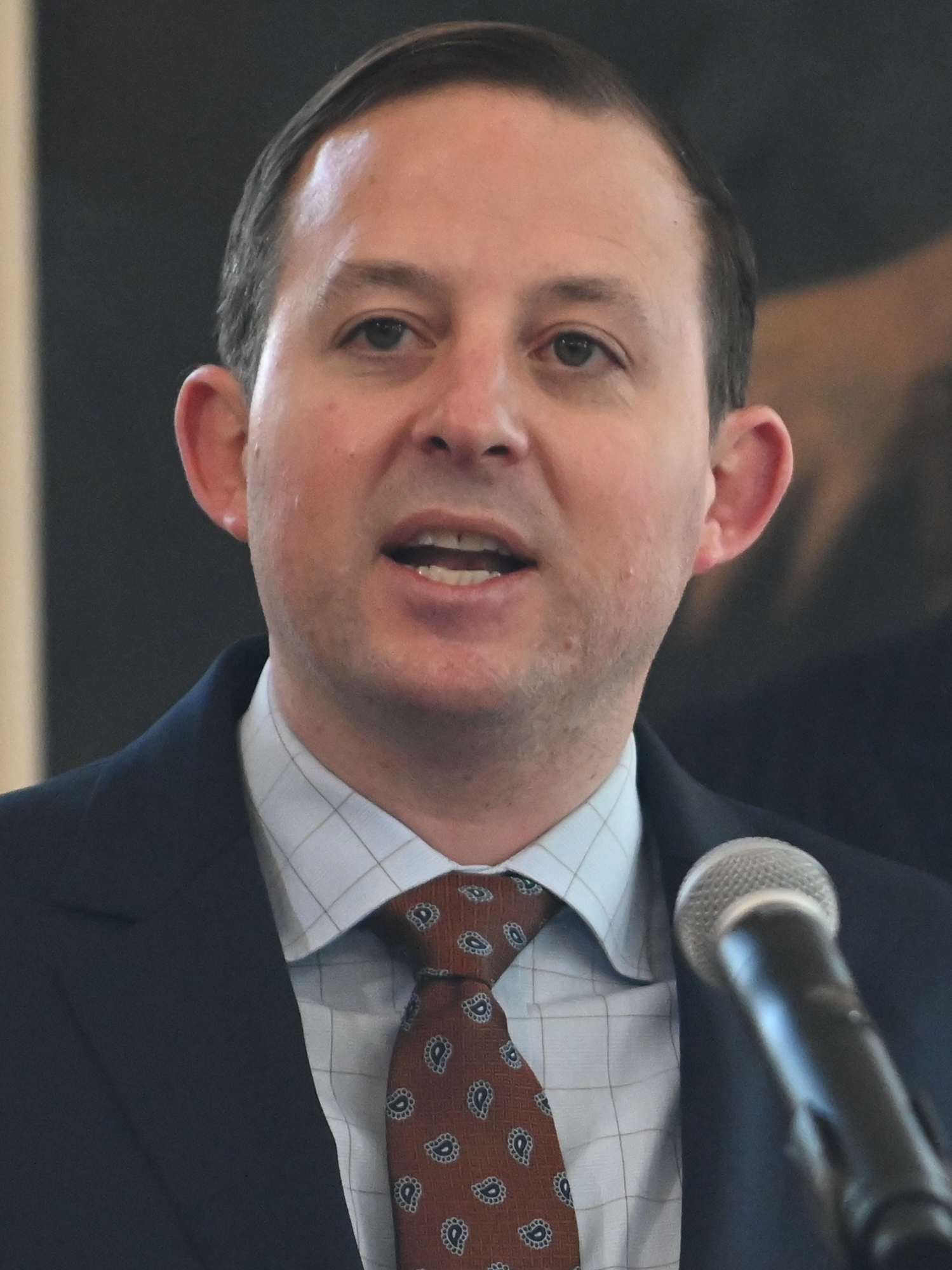

86th President of the Maryland Senate
- Incumbent
- Assumed office January 8, 2020
- Preceded by: Thomas V. Miller Jr.

Member of the Maryland Senate from the 46th district
- Incumbent
- Assumed office January 12, 2011
- Preceded by: George W. Della Jr.

Personal details
- Born: William Claiborne Ferguson IV; April 15, 1983 (age 43) Silver Spring, Maryland, U.S.
- Party: Democratic
- Spouse: Lea Ferguson (m. 2009)
- Children: 2
- Education: Davidson College (BA); Johns Hopkins University (MEd); University of Maryland, Baltimore (JD)
- Website: Campaign website
- Ferguson's voice Ferguson on bills to increase energy production in Maryland. Recorded March 21, 2025

William Claiborne Ferguson IV (born April 15, 1983) is an American politician, attorney, and former schoolteacher. He is a Democratic member of the Maryland Senate, representing the 46th legislative district since 2011, and serving as the President of the Maryland Senate since January 8, 2020. The district is composed of parts of Baltimore.

Born and raised in Silver Spring, Maryland, Ferguson graduated from Davidson College, Johns Hopkins University, and the University of Maryland, Baltimore. He began his career as a history teacher in Baltimore while attending Johns Hopkins, afterwards working in Baltimore City government. Ferguson was elected to the Maryland Senate in 2010 after defeating seven-term incumbent George W. Della Jr. in the Democratic primary for the 46th district. In October 2019, after Thomas V. Miller Jr. stepped down as president of the Maryland Senate, Ferguson was elected to succeed him.

== Education and early career ==
Ferguson was born in Silver Spring, Maryland, on April 15, 1983, to a conservative-leaning father who worked in commercial real estate and a labor union-supporting mother who supported President Bill Clinton. Ferguson graduated from Georgetown Preparatory School and Davidson College with a double major in political science and economics in 2005. He then joined Teach For America, teaching history and government to ninth and tenth graders at Southwestern High School in Baltimore for two years. In 2007, he earned a Master of Arts degree from the Johns Hopkins School of Education. Since 2012, Ferguson has served as the director of reform initiatives at the Johns Hopkins School of Education.

Ferguson served as a community liaison on educational issues for Sheila Dixon, the president of the Baltimore City Council, from 2005 to 2006. From 2009 to 2010, he was a special assistant to Andres Alonso, the chief executive officer of Baltimore City Public Schools. He graduated magna cum laude from the University of Maryland Francis King Carey School of Law with a Juris Doctor in 2010.

== In the legislature ==
In 2010, Ferguson challenged six-term incumbent George W. Della, Jr. for the Democratic nomination for the 46th district in the Maryland Senate. He won the primary election by a margin of 59–41%. Running in a heavily Democratic district, he won the general election with no formal opposition, receiving 98% of the vote. In the Senate, Ferguson gained a reputation as a mild-mannered nerd who specializes in education policy and the state budget. He is the youngest state senator ever elected in Maryland. His youth earned him the nickname of "Baby Senator".

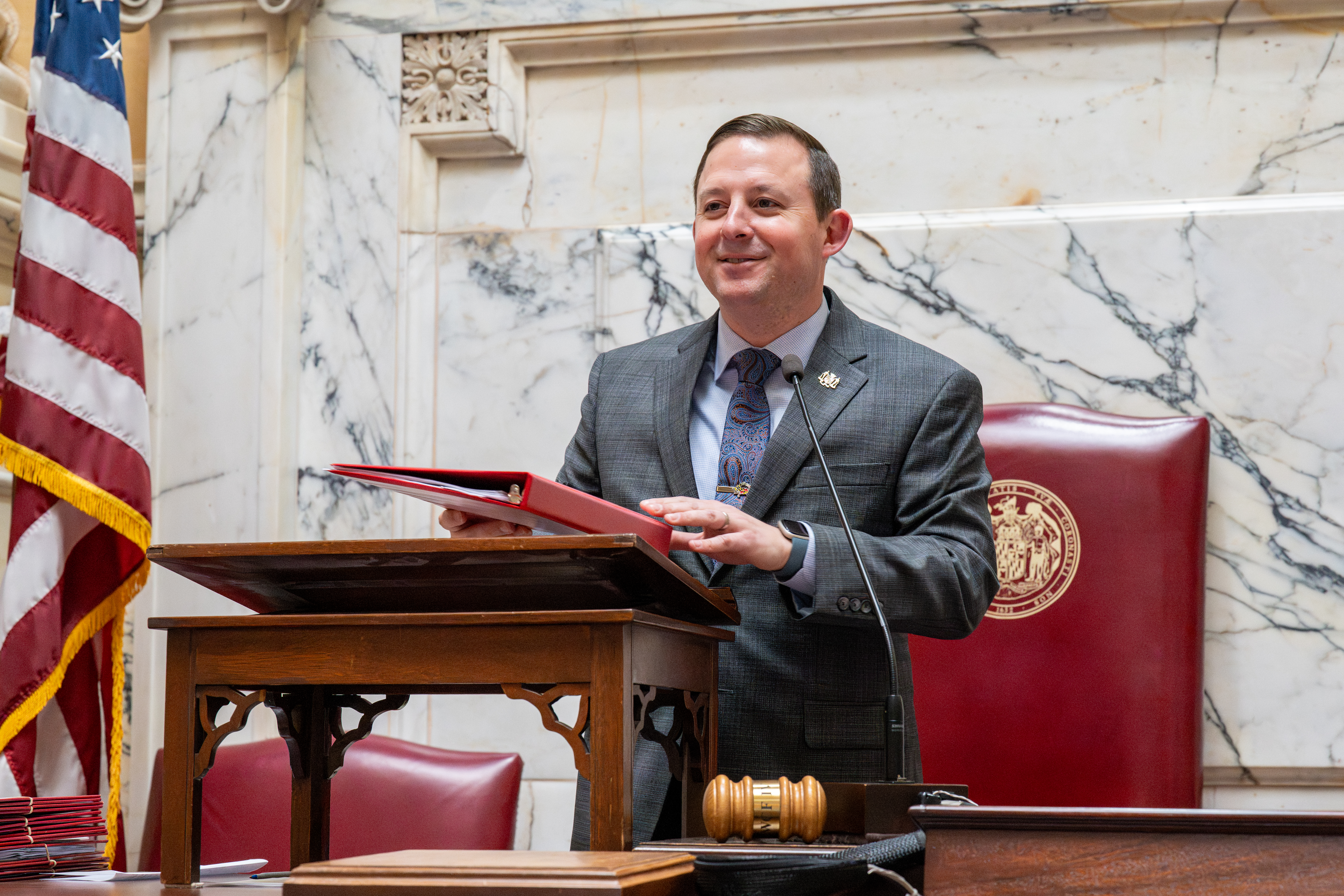
Ferguson at the rostrum of the Maryland Senate, 2026

On October 24, 2019, Senate Democrats unanimously voted to nominate Ferguson to succeed Senate President Thomas V. Mike Miller. Ferguson was perceived as more progressive than Miller. He was sworn in as Senate President on January 8, 2020. Ferguson spent much of his first few legislative sessions as Senate President trying to reel in the agenda of Republican Governor Larry Hogan, with Maryland Democrats having voted to override Hogan's vetoes more than two dozen times during the final two years of his tenure. During the tenure of Democratic Governor Wes Moore, Ferguson had a functional relationship with Moore and worked with the governor on several issues, but publicly feuded with Moore on the issue of mid-decade redistricting in Maryland and to negotiations on a new lease for Oriole Park at Camden Yards.

In June 2024, Ferguson joined CI Renewables, a Baltimore-based solar energy firm, as the company's general counsel.

Ferguson was an at-large delegate to the 2024 Democratic National Convention, pledged to Kamala Harris.

== Political positions ==
=== Education ===
Ferguson supports the Kirwan Commission recommendations, also known as the Blueprint for Maryland's Future, and served on the Commission on Innovation and Excellence in Education before becoming President of the Maryland Senate.

Ferguson opposed legislation introduced during the 2015 legislative session that would have armed school resource officers while they patrolled schools, calling it a "counterproductive strategy" and saying that counseling and other services would be more useful in enhancing school safety.

In 2018, Ferguson blamed Governor Larry Hogan after Baltimore schools closed early amid facilities problems, saying that the governor did not provide adequate funding for public schools.

=== Energy ===
In 2019, Ferguson voted in favor of an amendment to make the Wheelabrator Baltimore incinerator ineligible to receive renewable energy subsidies, which passed in a 34–12 vote. In October 2024, he announced that he would sponsor a bill to remove waste incineration from the state Renewable Portfolio Standard and end subsidies for burning waste as renewable energy. Ferguson's bill was integrated into the Next Generation Energy Act, a bill introduced by Ferguson and House Speaker Adrienne A. Jones to increase in-state power generation and battery energy storage while limiting how utilities could spend ratepayer dollars, which passed and was signed into law by Governor Wes Moore. Ferguson also added multiple provisions from Moore's ENERGIZE Act to the Next Generation Energy Act, but declined to add provisions that would've incorporated nuclear power into the state's clean energy portfolio and created a nuclear energy procurement process funded by surcharges on ratepayers' energy bills, saying that it was "not something that we were going to tolerate" because it would've increased energy costs for consumers.

In January 2026, Ferguson said he supported increasing the state's clean energy supplies to lower energy costs in Maryland. He also expressed openness to implementing short-term relief programs related to renewable energy to provide partial utility bill refunds to ratepayers funded by taking from the Strategic Energy Investment Fund, which is funded by utilities that can pay into the fund in lieu of purchasing renewable energy.

In February 2026, Ferguson objected to Baltimore Gas & Electric (BGE)'s plans to spend at least $537 million building transmission lines to prepare for the redevelopment of Baltimore Peninsula, saying that the spending "demands increased oversight to determine if it is truly needed for reliability", after which BGE announced that it would temporarily pause the underground transmission project, citing Ferguson's objections. In March 2026, he introduced a bill that would make underground power lines subject to review by the Maryland Public Service Commission.

=== Fiscal issues ===
In 2020, Ferguson stated that he would be opposed to an across-the-board increase in taxes to pay for the Blueprint for Maryland's Future, a sweeping education reform bill. During that year's legislative session, he introduced legislation that would levy a tax on digital advertising to pay for the Commission's reforms, which passed but was vetoed by Governor Hogan on May 7, 2020. The General Assembly voted to override the governor's veto on February 12, 2021.

During the 2022 legislative session, Ferguson worked with Governor Larry Hogan to pass a $1.86 billion tax cut. In May 2022, he rejected calls for an extension to Maryland's fuel tax holiday, claiming it would have "long-term consequences" for critical infrastructure in the state.

In August 2024, Ferguson stated that there was an "extremely high bar" for tax increases to resolve the state's $1 billion budget deficit, emphasizing the importance of economic growth. In November 2024, after state analysts released a report showing that the state would soon enter a revenue deficit worse than the Great Recession, he expressed openness to cutting funding for unsuccessful programs and levying new taxes "so long as those changes keep our state competitive with the surrounding region".

In January 2026, amid a $1.5 billion budget deficit, Ferguson supported proposals to limit the growth of Medicaid, behavioral health programs, and other social programs. During the 2026 legislative session, he supported bills to strengthen the Maryland Public Employee Relations Board and ban quasi-unions used to undermine collective bargaining, citing federal cuts to the National Labor Relations Board during the second Trump administration, and proposals to increase the state's investments in emerging industries such as artificial intelligence, biotechnology, aerospace, and advanced manufacturing.

In March 2026, Ferguson opposed a Republican proposal to impose a 30-day gas tax holiday following a spike in gas prices as a result of the 2026 Iran war, which he said would take away funding for the roads, bridges, and transit systems Maryland residents use to get to work, school, and other events.

=== Gun policy ===
During the 2013 legislative session, Ferguson voted for the Firearm Safety Act, a bill that placed restrictions on firearm purchases and magazine capacity in semi-automatic rifles. In November 2023, he criticized a Fourth Circuit Court of Appeals ruling that struck down a provision of the state's Firearm Safety Act that required handgun owners to obtain a "handgun qualification license" to buy a handgun.

=== Immigration ===
During the 2025 legislative session, Ferguson opted against passing legislation to prohibit counties from entering into 287(g) program agreements with U.S. Immigration and Customs Enforcement (ICE), citing fears of a retaliatory federal government and the possibility of President Donald Trump federalizing the Maryland National Guard. At the same time, he expressed sympathy toward Maryland's immigrant communities with respect to fears they may have as a result of the second Trump administration. After the Trump administration slashed federal funding to Maryland and deployed the National Guard to other blue states anyway, Ferguson endorsed a bill to ban 287(g) agreements in Maryland in November 2025, later describing ICE as a "paramilitary force" that has "gotten absolutely out of control" and criticizing how ICE engages with communities. In April 2026, after multiple county sheriffs said they would continue working with ICE despite Governor Moore signing the 287(g) ban into law, Ferguson endorsed the Community Trust Act, a bill that would require ICE to present a judicial warrant to compel state action and only allow for someone to be detained for ICE in a state or local correctional facility in certain situations.

=== Marijuana ===
Ferguson supports the legalization of recreational marijuana, saying he would support legalizing it by passing a law during the General Assembly session. In 2021, he co-sponsored legislation to legalize marijuana. In 2022, Ferguson said that a voter referendum to legalize marijuana "wouldn't be [his] first choice", but stressed that it would be unfair to put the question before the voters without letting them know the details of the state's marijuana program.

=== National politics ===
In October 2025, Ferguson blamed President Donald Trump for the 2025 United States federal government shutdown, but declined to call a special session to pass any new laws to address the shutdown.

=== Policing ===
During the 2018 legislative session, Ferguson introduced legislation that would establish a Commission to Restore Trust in Policing to investigate the Baltimore Police Department's Gun Trace Task Force, whose members' abuse of power over several years resulted in federal convictions of eight of the unit's nine officers on racketeering charges related to a robbery and extortion scheme. The bill passed both chambers unanimously and was signed into law by Governor Hogan on May 15, 2018. The Commission published its final report on December 2, 2020. In February 2021, Ferguson said that he would support repealing and replacing the state's Law Enforcement Officers' Bill of Rights.

In March 2021, Ferguson said that he would support giving Baltimore full local control of its police department, supporting a bill to include a city charter amendment to do so on the ballots of Baltimore voters as soon as 2022. The bill passed both chambers and became law on May 8, 2021.

In October 2021, Ferguson spoke out against Governor Hogan's proposal to increase funding for local law enforcement, saying in a statement that "divisive rhetoric does not make us safer" and that "improving public safety isn't about just writing a bigger check", but said that lawmakers "support investments that enhance trust and safety".

In August 2025, Ferguson condemned President Donald Trump's deployment of members of the National Guard to Washington, D.C., saying that deploying members of the military for law enforcement purposes could be "a recipe for disaster". He also condemned comments made by Trump regarding crime in Baltimore, noting that Baltimore has seen "some of the fastest declines of violent crime" compared to other major American cities.

=== Redistricting ===
In July 2021, Ferguson and House Speaker Adrienne A. Jones announced the formation of the Legislative Redistricting Advisory Commission, which would be tasked with redrawing Maryland's congressional districts for the 2020 United States redistricting cycle. The commission produced a congressional map that included seven safe Democratic districts and sought to make Maryland's 1st congressional district more friendly for Democrats. After a state court ruled in March 2022 that this map violated the Constitution of Maryland, the Maryland General Assembly passed a new map that included seven safe Democratic districts and one safe Republican seat. Ferguson later said he felt "a little bit uncomfortable" with passing the state's original congressional redistricting plan, saying that he made a misjudgment in adhering with more seasoned leaders who convinced him that a maximalist strategy would stand up to legal scrutiny.

In August 2025, amid Republican efforts to redraw Texas's congressional districts to gain five congressional seats in the 2026 United States House of Representatives elections, Ferguson declined to rule out passing legislation that would allow Maryland to redraw its congressional districts in response, saying that "at this point, nothing can be off the table". He also criticized the attempts to redraw Texas's districts as a "dangerous road for democracy". In September 2025, Ferguson reiterated that he was not yet sold on an effort to redraw Maryland's congressional districts, saying that doing so "should be the absolute last option on the table". In October 2025, Ferguson sent a letter to all Democratic members of the Maryland Senate rejecting efforts to redraw Maryland's congressional districts, expressing concerns that a new map would get overturned by the Maryland Supreme Court and redrawn into one that allows Republicans to gain another congressional seat in Maryland. In December 2025, after the Governor's Redistricting Advisory Commission (GRAC) voted to recommend mid-decade redistricting in Maryland, Ferguson released a statement criticizing the vote as "pre-ordained" and "predetermined". In January 2026, he voted against recommending a congressional redistricting map that would increase the Democratic Party's chances of winning Maryland's 1st congressional district, the only one represented by a Republican. In February 2026, after the Maryland House of Delegates voted to pass the GRAC map, Ferguson said the Senate would not hold a floor vote on the bill.

In March 2026, Ferguson opposed a compromise proposal that would amend the Constitution of Maryland to clarify that its map-drawing guidelines would only apply to state legislative districts and not to congressional districts, saying that it would violate the Maryland Constitution's single subject rule, which requires that General Assembly bills only tackle one topic at a time, since the proposal was amended onto a bill that would require special elections to fill vacancies in the General Assembly. He also said that the Maryland Senate would not deal with any redistricting-related issues again until 2032, when the state is required to redraw its congressional districts.

In April 2026, Ferguson condemned the U.S. Supreme Court's ruling in Louisiana v. Callais while applauding the enactment of the Maryland Voting Rights Act, saying that it would "fill many of the newly created gaps at the local and municipal level to protect voting rights in Maryland". He also stated that Senate Democrats would "evaluate all methods of fighting back" against the Trump administration in response to the decision. In July 2026, Ferguson and House speaker Joseline Peña-Melnyk announced that the legislature would convene for a special session on redistricting following the U.S. Supreme Court's decision in Louisiana v. Callais. During the special session, the General Assembly passed a constitutional amendment that would exempt Maryland's congressional districts from redistricting guidelines in the state constitution.

=== Social issues ===
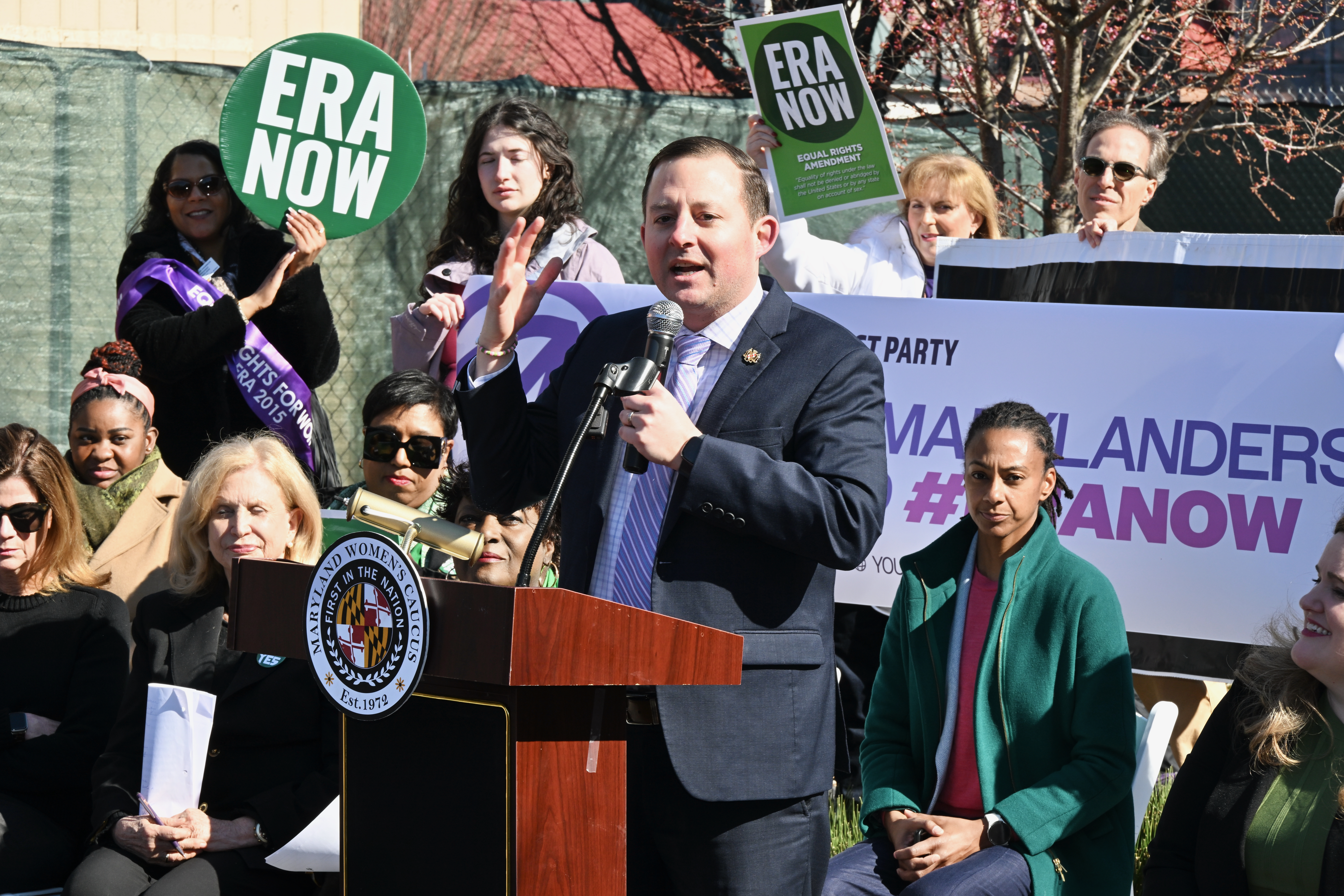
Ferguson speaks at an Equal Rights Amendment rally, 2024

Ferguson was a co-sponsor of the Civil Marriage Protection Act, which legalized same-sex marriage in Maryland.

In June 2021, Ferguson spoke out against Governor Hogan's decision to opt out of federal unemployment insurance programs provided under the American Rescue Plan Act, writing a letter to the governor urging him to rethink the decision.

During the 2022 legislative session, Ferguson introduced legislation that would require companies on The Block in Baltimore to close at 10 p.m. nightly. Following a compromise made between city politicians and venues on The Block, the bill was amended to require clubs to hire off-duty Baltimore police officers to patrol the nightlife district three nights a week and implement new security rules. The bill unanimously passed both chambers and became law on April 9, 2022.

In October 2023, Ferguson said he supported reforms to the process for filling vacancies in the Maryland General Assembly. He also endorsed ranked-choice voting in Maryland elections, but conceded that it was unlikely to pass the legislature anytime soon. In December 2024, a spokesperson for Ferguson told The Baltimore Sun that he supported proposals to replace the party central committee appointment process used to fill vacancies in the Maryland General Assembly with special elections.

In March 2026, Ferguson said he opposed a bill that would allow grocery stores to sell beer and wine, citing its potential impact on small liquor stores.

=== Transportation ===
In 2013, Ferguson called for a "rethink" of the Red Line, saying that he had "serious doubts" with the project's ability to serve as "the holy grail stimulus that transforms Baltimore City's future". In April 2013, he supported a proposal by the Right Rail Coalition to replace the eastern leg of the Red Line with a streetcar network.

In 2015, Ferguson sponsored legislation that would regulate and tax ridesharing companies in Maryland, but also allow such companies to operate under less regulations than traditional taxi companies. The bill passed and was signed into law by Governor Hogan on April 14, 2015.

Following the Francis Scott Key Bridge collapse in March 2024, Ferguson introduced an emergency bill to provide income replacement for workers impacted by the disaster.

In February 2026, Ferguson placed a hold on the confirmation of Maryland Transportation Secretary Kathryn Thomson, sending the acting secretary a letter calling for "a more robust investment and a real plan and vision for the Baltimore region" after the state's proposed transportation budget showed little additional funding for transit projects in the Baltimore region. Thomson met with Ferguson and other state lawmakers from Baltimore in March 2026, after which the Maryland Transit Administration announced plans to accelerate the development of a new bus division in Baltimore.

== Personal life ==
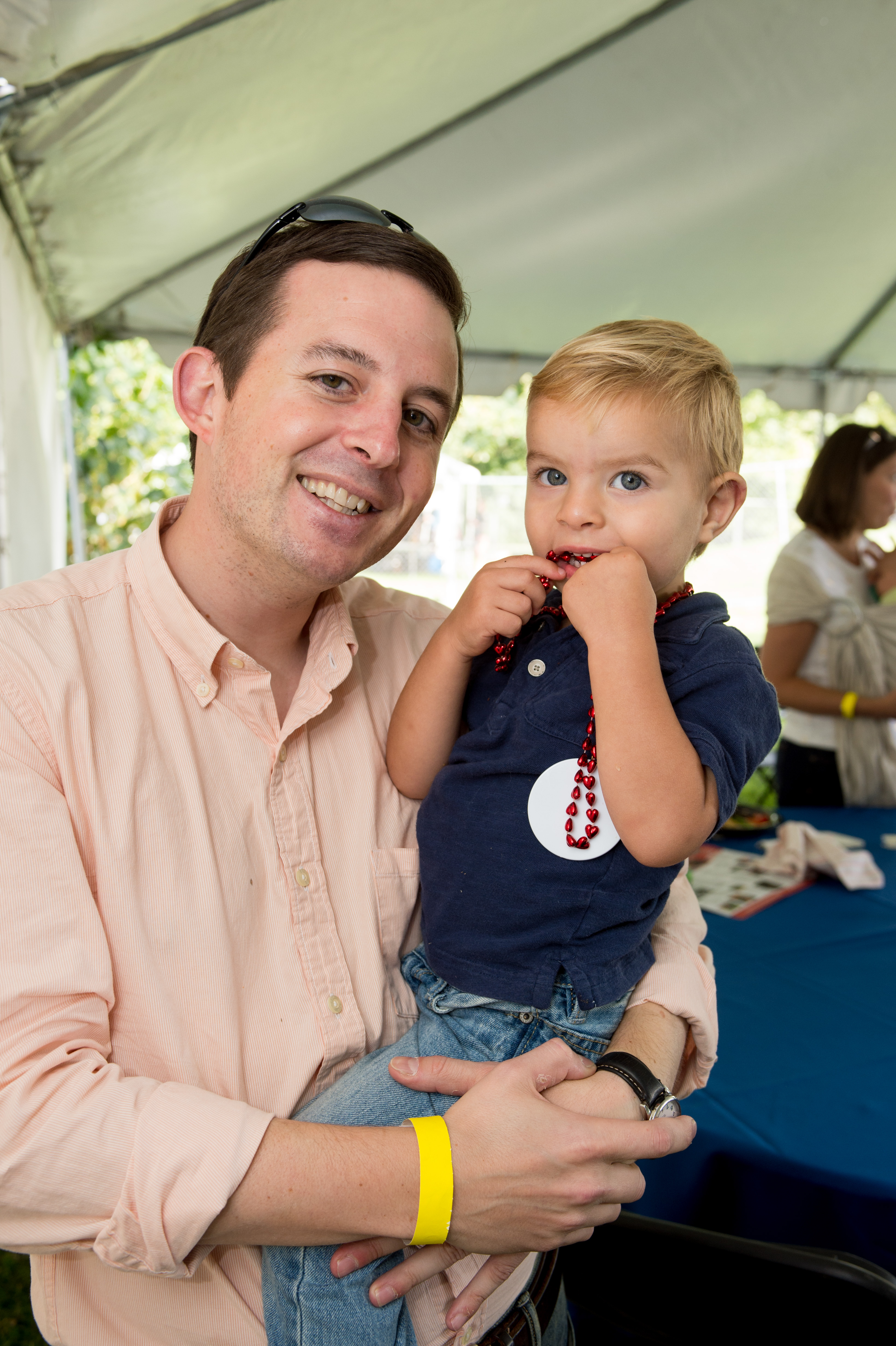
Ferguson with one of his children, 2014

Ferguson is married to Lea (née Smith), who he proposed to during the inauguration of Barack Obama in 2009. Together, they live in Patterson Park and have two children. He attends religious services at the St. Casimir Catholic Church in southeast Baltimore. Ferguson is a member of the Sons of the American Revolution.

== Electoral history ==
Maryland Senate District 46 Democratic primary election, 2010
Party	Candidate	Votes	%
Democratic	Bill Ferguson	5,248	59.0
Democratic	George W. Della Jr. (incumbent)	3,641	41.0

Maryland Senate District 46 election, 2010
Party	Candidate	Votes	%
Democratic	Bill Ferguson	19,126	97.9
Write-in		412	2.1

Maryland Senate District 46 election, 2014
Party	Candidate	Votes	%
Democratic	Bill Ferguson (incumbent)	17,320	97.3
Write-in		407	2.3
Democratic	Mateen Rasul Zar (write-in)	77	0.4

Maryland Senate District 46 election, 2018
Party	Candidate	Votes	%
Democratic	Bill Ferguson (incumbent)	26,203	78.2
Republican	Christine Digman	7,238	21.6
Write-in		60	0.2

Maryland Senate District 46 election, 2022
Party	Candidate	Votes	%
Democratic	Bill Ferguson (incumbent)	24,977	84.6
Republican	Emmanuel Digman	4,486	15.2
Write-in		50	0.2

Political offices
Preceded by Thomas V. Miller Jr.	President of the Maryland Senate; 2020–present	Incumbent
