= William N. Andrews =

American politician (1876–1937)

William Noble Andrews
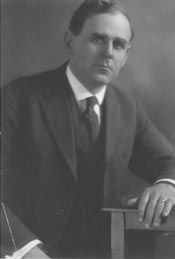

Member of the U.S. House of Representatives from Maryland's 1st district
- In office March 4, 1919 – March 3, 1921
- Preceded by: Jesse Price
- Succeeded by: Thomas Alan Goldsborough

Personal details
- Born: November 13, 1876 Hurlock, Maryland, U.S.
- Died: December 27, 1937 (aged 61) Cambridge, Maryland, U.S.
- Resting place: Washington Cemetery; Hurlock, Maryland, U.S.
- Party: Republican
- Spouses: Bessie Walworth (m. 1903; died 1919) Helen Virginia Phillips (m. 1919; div. 1924)
- Education: Wesley Collegiate Institute; University of Maryland at Baltimore (B.L.)

William Noble Andrews (November 13, 1876 – December 27, 1937) was a Congressman for the 1st congressional district of Maryland who served one term from 1919 to 1921.

== Early life ==
William Noble Andrews was born on November 13, 1876, in Hurlock, Maryland. He attended Dixon College for one year. He graduated from Wesley Collegiate Institute of Dover, Delaware in 1898 and from the law department of the University of Maryland at Baltimore in 1903 with a Bachelor of Laws. He was admitted to the bar in 1903 and commenced the practice of law in Cambridge, Maryland soon after.

== Career ==
From 1904 to 1911, Andrews served two terms as state attorney for Dorchester County, Maryland. He served as a member of the Maryland House of Delegates in 1914, and in the Maryland State Senate from 1918 until 1919, when he resigned to enter Congress. He was elected as a Republican to the sixty-sixth U.S. Congress in 1918, and served the Maryland's 1st congressional district for one full term from March 4, 1919, to March 3, 1921. He was an unsuccessful candidate for reelection in 1920, and resumed the practice of law until his death.

== Personal life ==
Andrews married Bessie Walworth on October 18, 1903. She died on January 21, 1919. Andrews married Helen Virginia Phillips of Cambridge on December 10, 1919. They divorced in 1924.

== Death ==
Andrews died on December 27, 1937, at Cambridge Hospital in Cambridge. He is interred in Washington Cemetery of Hurlock, Maryland.

U.S. House of Representatives
Preceded by Jesse Price	Member of the U.S. House of Representatives from Maryland's 1st congressional district March 4, 1919 – March 3, 1921	Succeeded by Thomas Alan Goldsborough
