= George W. Della Jr. =

American politician

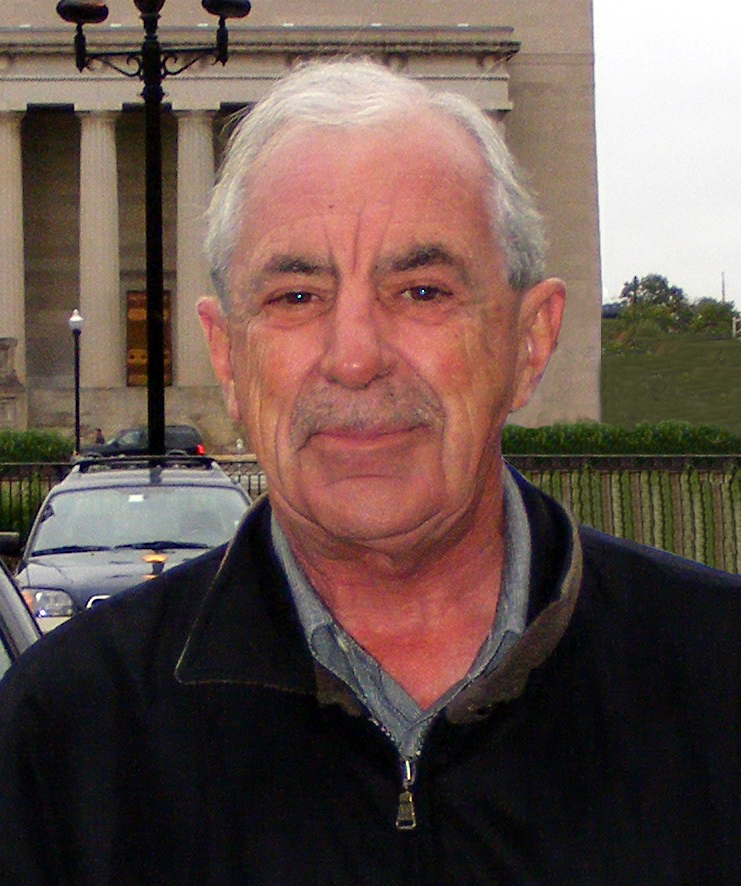
- former Maryland state senator and President of the Senate, George W. Della, Jr. of South / Southwestern Baltimore

Member of the Maryland Senate from the 46th district
- In office January 10, 1983 – January 12, 2011
- Succeeded by: Bill Ferguson

Member of the Baltimore City Council
- In office 1976–1983

Personal details
- Born: June 5, 1943 (age 83) Baltimore, Maryland, U.S.A.
- Party: Democratic
- Parent: George W. Della (Sr.)
- Education: University of Baltimore (Bachelor of Arts, B.A.); University of Baltimore School of Law, (Juris Doctor, J.D.)
- Occupation: Attorney

George W. Della Jr. is an American politician from Maryland and a member of the Democratic Party. He previously served in the General Assembly of Maryland in the upper house of the Maryland State Senate, representing District 46 in southern Baltimore City from 1983 to 2011.

== Background ==
Della was born in Baltimore, Maryland, the son of George W. Della (Sr., 1908-1990), the then also President of the Maryland Senate. He grew up in southwest Baltimore and attended the University of Baltimore and also subsequently the University of Baltimore School of Law. He still occasionally works as an attorney, following his political career.

== Political career ==
Della was first elected during the American Bicentennial year of 1976 to the Baltimore City Council, as one of the three councilmen then elected from the old 6th councilmanic district for south and southwestern Baltimore City serving six years (before the City Charter was amended in the early 2000s to create ten single-member districts currently).

In 1982, he won his seat in the Maryland Senate, representing the same area, which his father (George W. Della (Sr., 1908-1990) had also represented and serving as President of the Senate, several decades earlier.

He sat on the Finance Committee and the Executive Nominations Committee.

In January 2009, he introduced a bill (SB 233) intended to ban "Beer Pong", and would have "outlawed any games that award drinks as prizes in city taverns". Della withdrew the bill eve of its first committee hearing, stating ""We're getting inundated with so many e-mails that I don't have the time to fool with it... ...I just hope that if people continue doing it, they do it in a way that there's not excessive drinking and disrespect for the surrounding neighborhoods."

After 28 years in the body at the Maryland State House in the state capital of Annapolis, Della was defeated for reelection in the 2010 Democratic Party's primary by Bill Ferguson.

== See also ==
- Maryland State Senate
- Baltimore City Council
- George W. Della

== External sources ==
- Maryland Manual Online: George W. Della Jr.
- General Assembly of Maryland: George W. Della Jr.
- Open States: George W. Della Jr.
- Baltimore Sun: articles on George W. Della Jr.
