= Maryland Route 579 =

Highway in Maryland, United States

Maryland Route 579
- Bozman Neavitt Road
- Maryland Route 579 highlighted in red

Route information
- Maintained by MDSHA
- Length: 7.35 mi (11.83 km)
- Existed: 1935–present

Major junctions
- South end: Long Point Road in Neavitt
- North end: MD 33 near St. Michaels

Location
- Country: United States
- State: Maryland
- Counties: Talbot

Highway system
- Maryland highway system; Interstate; US; State; Scenic Byways
← MD 578	→ MD 584

Maryland Route 579 (MD 579) is a state highway in the U.S. state of Maryland. Known as Bozman Neavitt Road, the state highway runs 7.35 miles (11.83 km) from the beginning of state maintenance in Neavitt north to MD 33 near St. Michaels. MD 579 provides access to the peninsula containing Neavitt and Bozman, which lies between Harris Creek and Broad Creek in western Talbot County. The state highway was constructed from MD 33 to Bozman in the mid-1930s and extended to Neavitt in the late 1950s.

== Route description ==
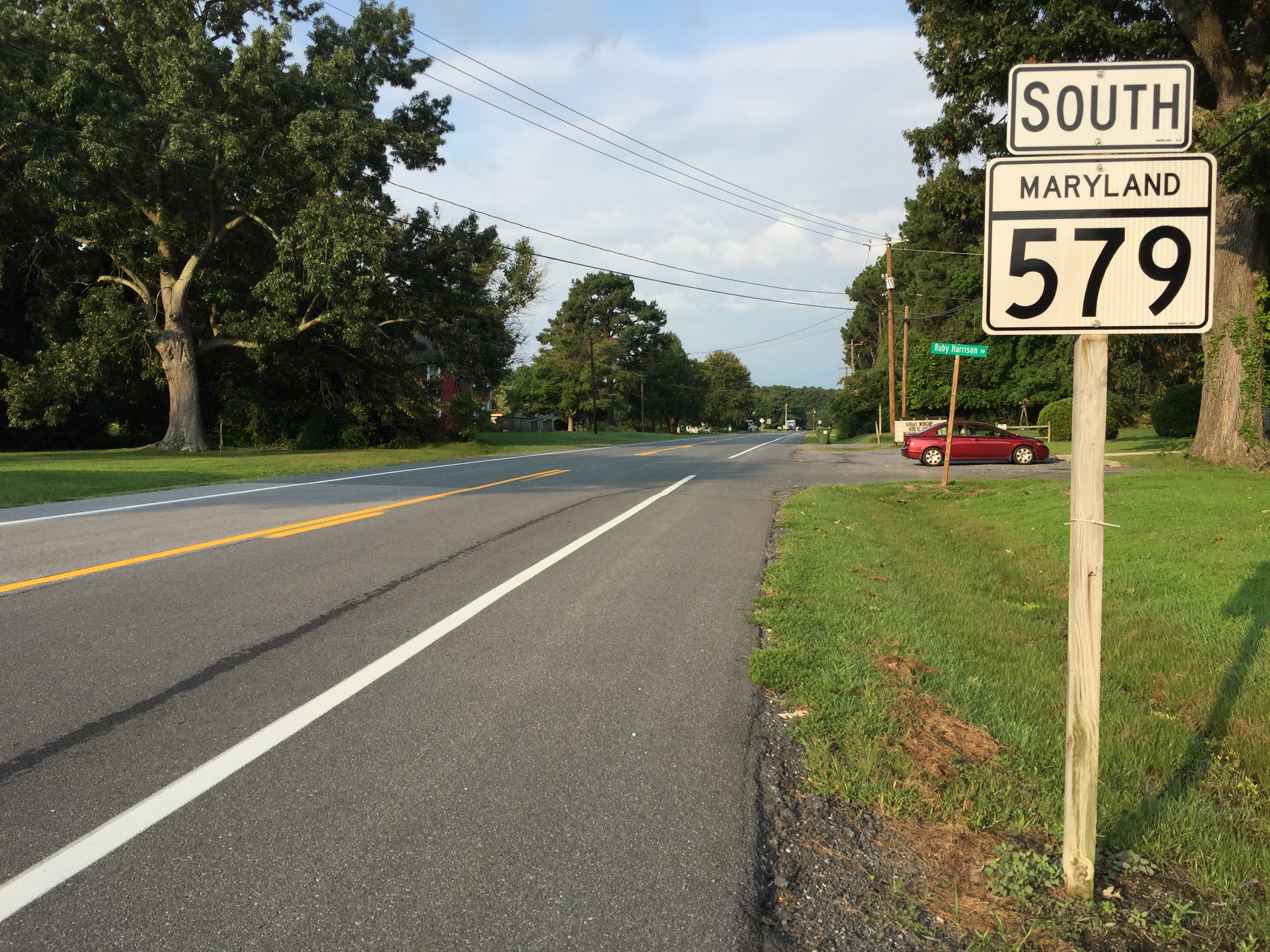
View south along MD 579 in Bozman

MD 579 begins at the beginning of state maintenance at the southern end of the village of Neavitt. Long Point Road continues south 0.49 mi (0.79 km) to its southern terminus, and another road continues south a short distance further to Long Point. MD 579 heads northwest as a two-lane undivided road through Neavitt, which sits on Balls Creek to the northeast. The state highway curves north after leaving Neavitt and passes Wells Point Lane, which leads to the Jean Ellen duPont Shehan Audubon Sanctuary. MD 579 continues north through a mix of farms and residences on large, waterfront lots, curving northeast around the head of Leadenham Creek and into the village of Bozman. Within Bozman, the state highway intersects Bush Neck Road, which leads to Bush Neck and the Cooper Point peninsula, which flank Grace Creek. MD 579 heads north out of Bozman, passing through the narrow neck of land between Harris Creek and Broad Creek before reaching the highway's northern terminus at MD 33 (St. Michaels Road) northwest of the town of St. Michaels.

== History ==
MD 579 was constructed as a modern road from MD 33 south to just north of Bozman in 1935. The state highway was extended to its present terminus in Neavitt in 1957.

== Junction list ==
The entire route is in Talbot County.

Location	mi	km	Destinations	Notes
Neavitt	0.00	0.00	Long Point Road south	Southern terminus
	7.35	11.83	MD 33 (St. Michaels Road) – Tilghman Island, Easton	Northern terminus
1.000 mi = 1.609 km; 1.000 km = 0.621 mi
