= Arthur Pue Gorman Jr. =

American politician (1873–1919)

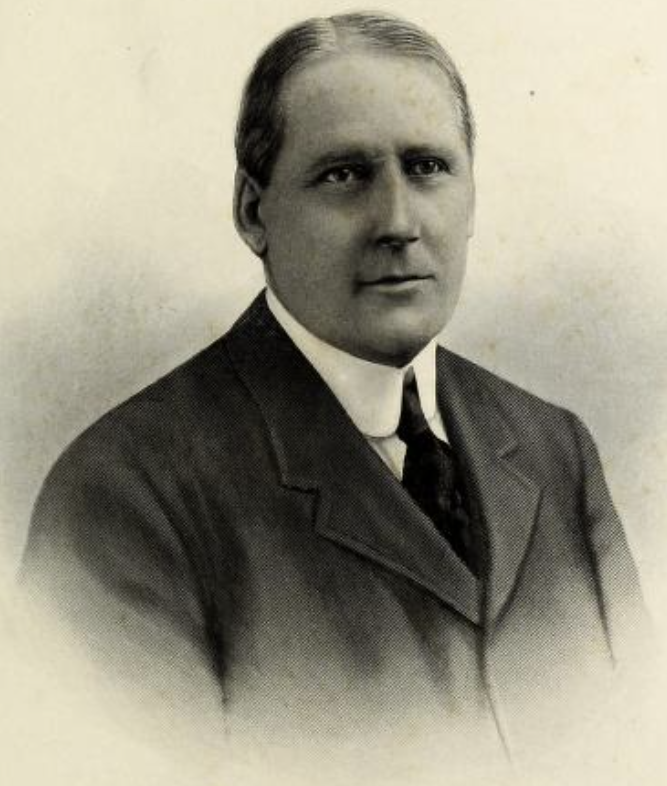
- Gorman in 1914 publication

President of the Maryland Senate
- In office 1910–1912
- Preceded by: Joseph B. Seth
- Succeeded by: Jesse D. Price

Member of the Maryland Senate
- In office 1904–1912

Personal details
- Born: March 27, 1873 Howard County, Maryland, U.S.
- Died: September 3, 1919 (aged 46) Baltimore, Maryland, U.S.
- Resting place: Oak Hill Cemetery; Washington, D.C., U.S.
- Party: Democratic
- Spouse: Grace James Norris (m. 1900)
- Parent: Arthur Pue Gorman (father)
- Education: Columbian University; University of Maryland
- Occupation: Politician; lawyer
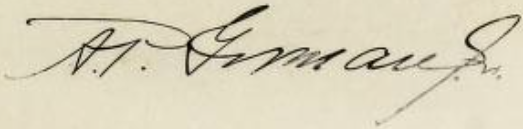
- Signature

Arthur Pue Gorman Jr. (March 27, 1873 – September 3, 1919) was an American politician. He served in the Maryland Senate from 1904 to 1912. He was an unsuccessful candidate in the 1911 Maryland gubernatorial election.

== Early life ==
Arthur Pue Gorman Jr. was born on March 27, 1873, in Howard County, Maryland to Hannah Donagan and Arthur Pue Gorman. His father was a senator. He attended private schools in Washington, D.C., Episcopal High School in Alexandria, Virginia, and Lawrenceville, New Jersey. He received a legal education at Columbian University (now George Washington University) and the University of Maryland. He also worked in the office of John P. Poe Sr.

== Career ==
Gorman formed Miles & Gorman, a law practice with Alonzo L. Miles. He was a member of the staffs of Governors John Walter Smith and Austin L. Crothers. He served as colonel with Governor Smith from 1900 to 1904. He then served as brigadier general with Governor Crothers from 1908 to 1912.

Gorman was a Democrat. He served in the Maryland Senate, representing Howard County, from 1904 to 1912. He served as President of the Maryland Senate from 1910 to 1912. While in the senate, Gorman was active in the investigation of the affairs of the Baltimore and Ohio Railroad.

In 1911, Gorman defeated Blair Lee in the Democratic primary for governor. Gorman would lose to Phillips Lee Goldsborough in the 1911 Maryland gubernatorial election. Historians attribute Gorman's loss to Goldsborough to Gorman's bitter primary fight with Lee.

In 1914, Gorman was the first chairman of the Maryland State Tax Commission. He served in this role until his death. He served as director of the Citizens National Bank in Laurel.

== Personal life ==
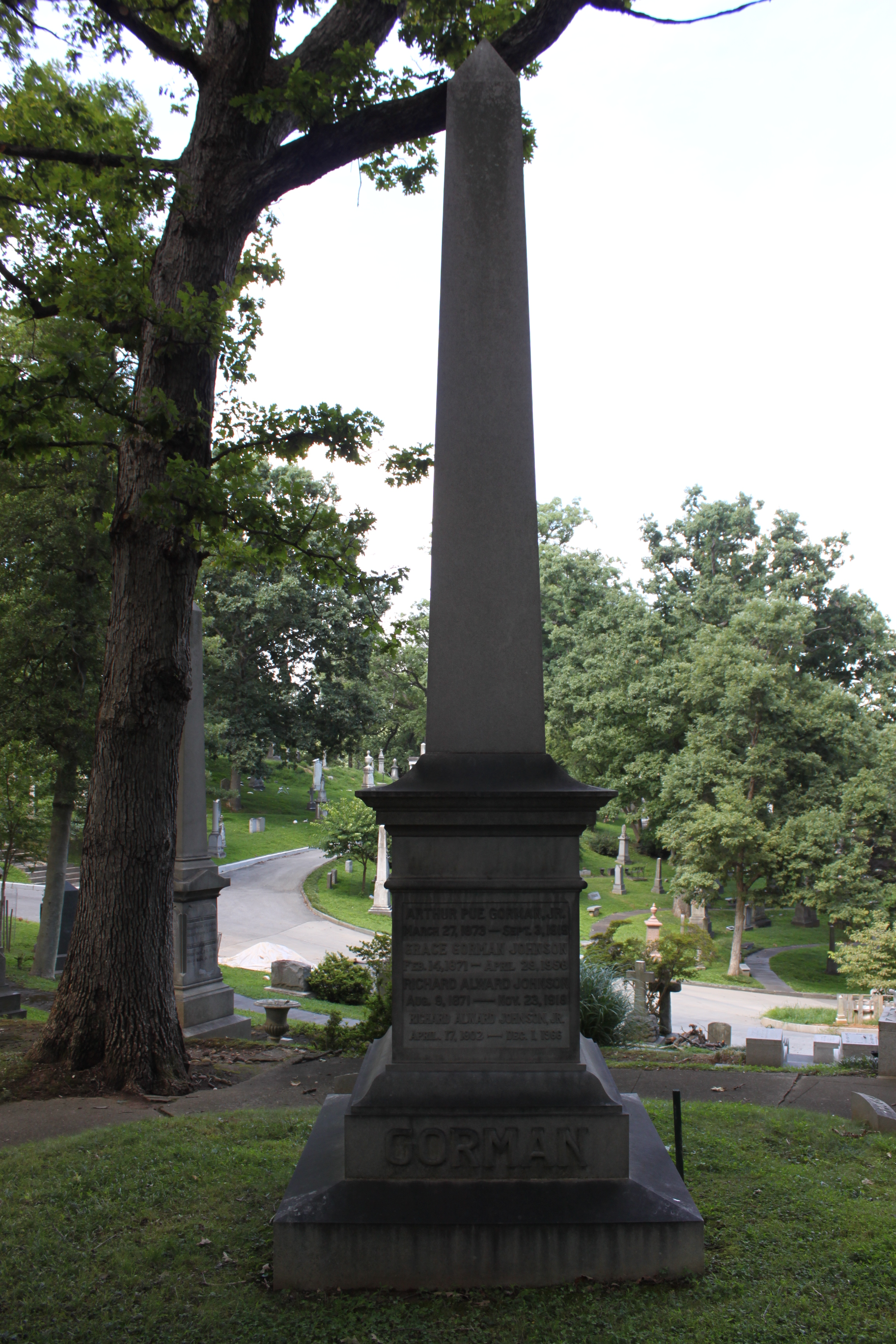
Grave of Gorman at Oak Hill Cemetery

Gorman married Grace James Norris, daughter of Annie Virginia (née Robinson) and James Lawson Norris, on November 28, 1900.

Gorman died on September 3, 1919, at a hospital in Baltimore after a long illness from diabetes. He was buried at Oak Hill Cemetery in Washington, D.C.

Party political offices
Preceded by Austin Lane Crothers	Democratic nominee for Governor of Maryland; 1911	Succeeded by Emerson Harrington
Political offices
Preceded by Joseph B. Seth	President of the Maryland State Senate; 1910–1912	Succeeded by Jesse D. Price
