= Jesse Price =

Jesse Price may refer to:

- Jesse Price (politician)
- Jesse Price (musician)
