= Bozman, Maryland =

Unincorporated community in Maryland, United States

- Unincorporated community
- Location within Maryland
- Coordinates: 38°46′12″N 76°16′16″W
- Country: United States
- State: Maryland
- County: Talbot
- Elevation: 7 ft (2.1 m)
- Time zone: UTC-5 (Eastern (EST))
  - Summer (DST): UTC-4 (EDT)
- ZIP code: 21612
- Area codes: 410, 443, and 667
- GNIS feature ID: 589793

Bozman is an unincorporated community in Talbot County, Maryland, United States. Bozman is located along Maryland Route 579, southwest of St. Michaels.
