= President of the Maryland Senate =

- Seal of Maryland

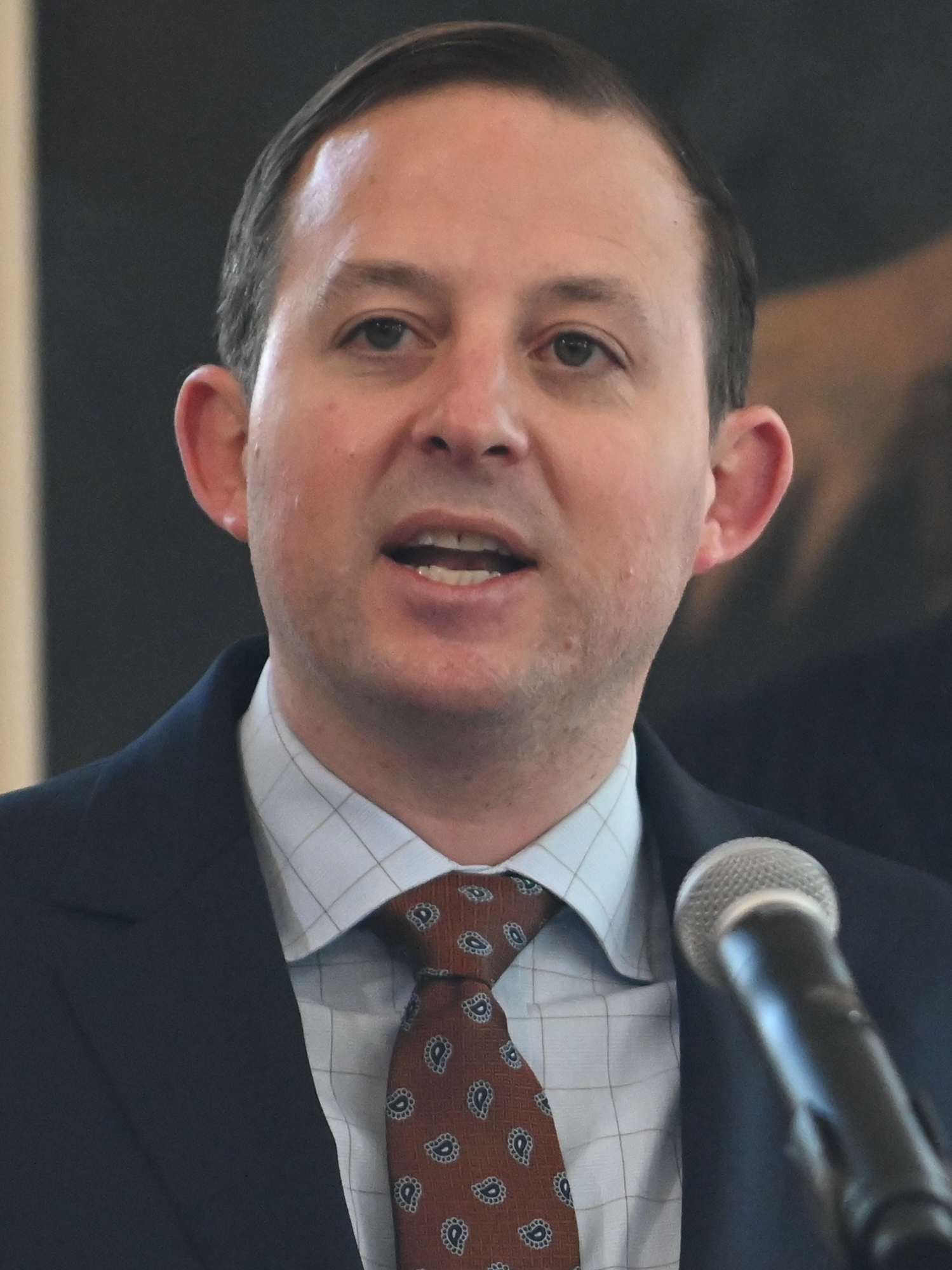
- Incumbent; Bill Ferguson since January 8, 2020
- Style: The Honorable (diplomatic); Mr. President (within the assembly)
- Inaugural holder: Daniel of St. Thomas Jenifer; 1777
- Formation: Maryland State Constitution
- Succession: Second
- Website: Maryland General Assembly

The President of the Maryland Senate is elected by a majority of the state senators. The incumbent is Bill Ferguson who has held the role since January 8, 2020.

The Maryland Constitution of 1864 created the new position of Lieutenant Governor of Maryland, elected by the voters of the state. That officer served as president of the Senate and would assume the office of governor if the incumbent should die, resign, be removed, or be disqualified. Christopher Christian Cox was the first and only lieutenant governor to preside over the Senate in that capacity; the position was abolished in the state's 1867 Constitution, which remains in effect as amended. When the lieutenant governorship was re-established by a constitutional amendment in 1970, it did not include the Senate presidency.

== List of Senate presidents ==
Order	Name (Political Party)	District	Sessions
1	Daniel of St. Thomas Jenifer		1777–1780
2	Matthew Tilghman		1780
3	Daniel of St. Thomas Jenifer		1780
4	George Plater		1780–1782
5	Matthew Tilghman		1782–1783
6	Charles Carroll of Carrollton		1783
7	Daniel Carroll		1783
8	Charles Carroll of Carrollton		1783
9	George Plater		1784
10	John Smith		1784
11	George Plater		1785
12	Daniel Carroll		1785
13	George Plater		1786
14	John Smith		1786
15	Daniel Carroll		1787
16	George Plater		1787–1788
17	Daniel Carroll		1788–1789
18	John Smith		1789
19	George Plater		1790
20	William Smallwood		1791
21	George Dent		1792
22	William Perry		1792–1798
23	John Thomas		1797–1800
24	Richard Harwood		1801–1805
25	William Thomas		1806–1807
26	Stephen Lowrey		1807
27	William Thomas		1807–1809
28	Stephen Lowrey		1809
29	William Thomas		1809–1813
30	Elijah Davis		1813–1815
31	William Spencer		1816–1820
32	William R. Stuart		1821–1825
33	Edward Lloyd		1826
34	William H. Marriott		1827–1830
35	Benjamin S. Forrest		1831–1834
36	Thomas Sappington		1834
37	John G. Chapman (Whig)		1834–1836
38	Richard Thomas	St. Mary's	1836–1843
39	William Williams	Somerset	1844–1847
40	William Lingan Gaither	Montgomery	1849
41	Edward Lloyd	Talbot	1852–1853
42	William Lingan Gaither	Montgomery	1854
43	George Wells	Anne Arundel	1856
44	Edwin H. Webster	Harford	1858
45	John B. Brooke	Prince George's	1860–1861
46	Henry Hollyday Goldsborough	Talbot	1861–1862
47	John S. Sellman	Anne Arundel	1864
48	Christopher C. Cox (National Union)*		1865–1867
49	Barnes Compton (D)	Charles	1868–1870
50	Henry Snyder (D)	Baltimore City, District 2	1872
51	John Lee Carroll (D)	Howard	1874
52	Daniel Fields (D)	Caroline	1876
53	Edward Lloyd (D)	Talbot	1878
54	Herman Stump, Jr. (D)	Harford	1880
55	George Hawkins Williams (D)	Baltimore	1882
56	Henry Lloyd (D)	Dorchester	1884
57	Edwin Warfield (D)	Howard	1886
58	George Peter (D)	Montgomery	1888
59	Robert Franklin Brattan (D)	Somerset	1890
60	Edward Lloyd VII (D)	Talbot	1892
61	John Walter Smith (D)	Worcester	1894
62	William Cabell Bruce (D)	Baltimore City, District 2	1896
63	John Wirt Randall (R)	Anne Arundel	1898
64	John Hubner (D)	Baltimore	1900–1902
65	Spencer Cone Jones (D)	Montgomery	1904
66	Joseph B. Seth (D)	Talbot	1906–1908
67	Arthur Pue Gorman Jr. (D)	Howard	1910
68	Jesse D. Price (D)	Wicomico	1912–1914
69	Peter J. Campbell (D)	Baltimore City, District 2	1916–1918
70	William I. Norris (D)	Baltimore City, District 1	1920–1922
71	David G. McIntosh Jr. (D)	Baltimore	1924–1929
72	Walter J. Mitchell (D)	Charles	1931–1933
73	Lansdale G. Sasscer (D)	Prince George's	1935–1937
74	Arthur H. Brice (D)	Kent	1939–1943
75	James J. Lindsay, Jr. (D)	Baltimore	1944–1946
76	Joseph R. Byrnes (D)	Baltimore City, District 5	1947–1950
77	L. Harold Sothoron (D)	Prince George's	1950
78	George W. Della (D)	Baltimore City, District 6	1951–1954
79	Louis L. Goldstein (D)	Calvert	1955–1958
80	George W. Della (D)	Baltimore City, District 6	1959–1962
81	William S. James (D)	Harford	1963–1974
82	Steny Hoyer (D)	District 26	1975–1978
83	James Clark, Jr. (D)	District 14	1979–1982
84	Melvin A. Steinberg (D)	District 11	1983–1986
85	Thomas V. 'Mike' Miller, Jr. (D)	District 27	1987–January 8, 2020
86	Bill Ferguson (D)	District 46	January 8, 2020 – Present

* Cox was elected Lieutenant Governor under the 1864 Constitution, which made him ex officio president of the Senate.

== See also ==
- List of Maryland General Assembly sessions
