= Peter J. Campbell =

American politician (1857–1919)

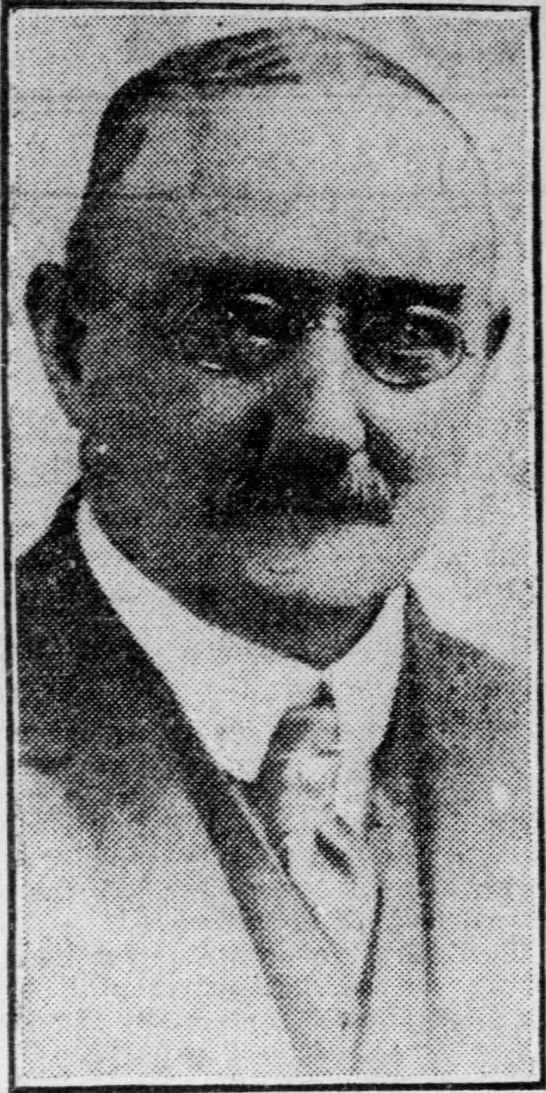

Peter J. Campbell (April 13, 1857 – December 20, 1919) was an American lawyer and politician, a member of the Maryland House of Delegates and President of the Maryland Senate.

Born at Baltimore, Maryland, Campbell attended private and public schools, including a private class taught by Woodrow Wilson, and graduated from the law school at the University of Maryland in 1884, and admitted to the bar that year. Politically, he was a Democrat. In 1885, he was elected to the Maryland House of Delegates, and twice re-elected. In 1911, he was elected to the Maryland State Senate, where he served as the chairman of the finance committee. Re-elected in 1915, he became the senate president in 1916, a post he held until his death. He was re-elected in 1919, but died before the legislature convened.
