= Political party strength in Maryland =

Politics in the US state of Maryland

The following table indicates the party of elected officials in the U.S. state of Maryland:

- Governor
- Lieutenant Governor
- Attorney General
- State Comptroller

The table also indicates the historical party composition in the:

- State Senate
- State House of Delegates
- State delegation to the United States Senate
- State delegation to the United States House of Representatives

For years in which a presidential election was held, the table indicates which party's nominees received the state's electoral votes.

== 1777–1851 ==
Year	Executive offices		General Assembly		United States Congress			Electoral votes
Year	Governor	Attorney General	State Senate	State House	U.S. Senator (Class I)	U.S. Senator (Class III)	U.S. House	Electoral votes
1777	Thomas Johnson (I)		[?]	[?]				
1777	Thomas Johnson (I)	James Tilghman (I)	[?]	[?]				
1778	Thomas Johnson (I)	Luther Martin (I)	[?]	[?]				
1779	Thomas Johnson (I)	Luther Martin (I)	[?]	[?]				
1780	Thomas Sim Lee (I)	Luther Martin (I)	[?]	[?]				
1781	Thomas Sim Lee (I)	Luther Martin (I)	[?]	[?]				
1782	Thomas Sim Lee (I)	Luther Martin (I)	[?]	[?]				
1783	William Paca (I)	Luther Martin (I)	[?]	[?]				
1784	William Paca (I)	Luther Martin (I)	[?]	[?]				
1785	William Paca (I)	Luther Martin (I)	[?]	[?]				
1786	William Smallwood (I)	Luther Martin (I)	[?]	[?]				
1787	William Smallwood (I)	Luther Martin (I)	[?]	[?]				
1788	William Smallwood (I)	Luther Martin (I)	[?]	[?]				
1789	John Eager Howard (F)	Luther Martin (AA)	[?]	[?]	Charles Carroll (PA)	John Henry (PA)	4AA, 2PA	George Washington (I) ✓
1790	John Eager Howard (F)	Luther Martin (AA)	[?]	[?]	Charles Carroll (PA)	John Henry (PA)	4AA, 2PA	George Washington (I) ✓
1791	John Eager Howard (F)	Luther Martin (AA)	[?]	[?]	Charles Carroll (PA)	John Henry (PA)	3AA, 3PA	George Washington (I) ✓
1791	George Plater (F) (Note: Died in office.)	Luther Martin (F)	[?]	[?]	Charles Carroll (PA)	John Henry (PA)	3AA, 3PA	George Washington (I) ✓
1792	George Plater (F)	Luther Martin (F)	[?]	[?]	Charles Carroll (PA)	John Henry (PA)	3AA, 3PA	George Washington (I) ✓
1792	James Brice (F) (Note: As senior member of the Governor's Council, was appointed by state legislature to fill term until replacement elected.)	Luther Martin (F)	[?]	[?]	Charles Carroll (PA)	John Henry (PA)	3AA, 3PA	George Washington (I) ✓
1792	Thomas Sim Lee (F)	Luther Martin (F)	[?]	[?]	Charles Carroll (PA)	John Henry (PA)	3AA, 3PA	George Washington (I) ✓
1793	Thomas Sim Lee (F)	Luther Martin (F)	[?]	[?]	Richard Potts (PA)	John Henry (PA)	4AA, 4PA	George Washington (I) ✓
1794	Thomas Sim Lee (F)	Luther Martin (F)	[?]	[?]	Richard Potts (PA)	John Henry (PA)	4AA, 4PA	George Washington (I) ✓
1795	John Hoskins Stone (F)	Luther Martin (F)	[?]	[?]	Richard Potts (PA)	John Henry (PA)	4DR, 4F	George Washington (I) ✓
1796	John Hoskins Stone (F)	Luther Martin (F)	[?]	[?]	Richard Potts (PA)	John Henry (PA)	4DR, 4F	John Adams (F) ✓
1797	John Hoskins Stone (F)	Luther Martin (F)	[?]	[?]	John Eager Howard (F)	John Henry (PA)	6F, 2DR	John Adams (F) ✓
1798	John Henry (DR)	Luther Martin (F)	[?]	[?]	John Eager Howard (F)	James Lloyd (F)	6F, 2DR	John Adams (F) ✓
1799	Benjamin Ogle (F)	Luther Martin (F)	[?]	[?]	John Eager Howard (F)	James Lloyd (F)	5F, 3DR	John Adams (F) ✓
1800	Benjamin Ogle (F)	Luther Martin (F)	[?]	[?]	John Eager Howard (F)	James Lloyd (F)	5F, 3DR	Thomas Jefferson (DR) ✓ and John Adams (F) ✗
1801	Benjamin Ogle (F)	Luther Martin (F)	[?]	47DR, 33F	John Eager Howard (F)	William Hindman (F)	6DR, 2F	Thomas Jefferson (DR) ✓ and John Adams (F) ✗
1802	John Francis Mercer (DR)	Luther Martin (F)	15DR	53DR, 27F	John Eager Howard (F)	Robert Wright (DR)	6DR, 2F	Thomas Jefferson (DR) ✓ and John Adams (F) ✗
1803	John Francis Mercer (DR)	Luther Martin (F)	15DR	47DR, 33F	Samuel Smith (DR)	Robert Wright (DR)	7DR, 2F	Thomas Jefferson (DR) ✓ and John Adams (F) ✗
1804	Robert Bowie (DR)	Luther Martin (F)	15DR	47DR, 33F	Samuel Smith (DR)	Robert Wright (DR)	7DR, 2F	Thomas Jefferson (DR) ✓
1805	Robert Bowie (DR)	William Pinkney (DR)	15DR	52DR, 28F	Samuel Smith (DR)	Robert Wright (DR)	7DR, 2F	Thomas Jefferson (DR) ✓
1806	Robert Bowie (DR)	William Pinkney (DR)	15DR	56DR, 24F	Samuel Smith (DR)	Robert Wright (DR)	7DR, 2F	Thomas Jefferson (DR) ✓
1806	Robert Bowie (DR)	John Thomson Mason (DR)	15DR	56DR, 24F	Samuel Smith (DR)	Robert Wright (DR)	7DR, 2F	Thomas Jefferson (DR) ✓
1806	Robert Bowie (DR)	John Johnson Sr. (DR)	15DR	56DR, 24F	Samuel Smith (DR)	Robert Wright (DR)	7DR, 2F	Thomas Jefferson (DR) ✓
1807	Robert Wright (DR)	John Johnson Sr. (DR)	15DR	54DR, 25F, 1 vac.	Samuel Smith (DR)	Philip Reed (DR)	6DR, 3F	Thomas Jefferson (DR) ✓
1808	Robert Wright (DR)	John Johnson Sr. (DR)	15DR	51DR, 29F	Samuel Smith (DR)	Philip Reed (DR)	6DR, 3F	James Madison (DR) ✓
1809	Robert Wright (DR)	John Johnson Sr. (DR)	15DR	43F, 37DR	Samuel Smith (DR)	Philip Reed (DR)	6DR, 3F	James Madison (DR) ✓
1809	Edward Lloyd (DR)	John Johnson Sr. (DR)	15DR	43F, 37DR	Samuel Smith (DR)	Philip Reed (DR)	6DR, 3F	James Madison (DR) ✓
1810	Edward Lloyd (DR)	John Johnson Sr. (DR)	15DR	44DR, 36F	Samuel Smith (DR)	Philip Reed (DR)	6DR, 3F	James Madison (DR) ✓
1811	Edward Lloyd (DR)	John Montgomery (DR)	15DR	48DR, 32F	Samuel Smith (DR)	Philip Reed (DR)	6DR, 3F	James Madison (DR) ✓
1812	Robert Bowie (DR)	John Montgomery (DR)	15DR	44DR, 36F	Samuel Smith (DR)	Philip Reed (DR)	6DR, 3F	James Madison (DR) ✓
1813	Levin Winder (F)	John Montgomery (DR)	15DR	54F, 26DR	Samuel Smith (DR)	Robert Henry; Goldsborough (F)	6DR, 3F	James Madison (DR) ✓
1814	Levin Winder (F)	John Montgomery (DR)	15DR	49F, 31DR	Samuel Smith (DR)	Robert Henry; Goldsborough (F)	6DR, 3F	James Madison (DR) ✓
1815	Levin Winder (F)	John Montgomery (DR)	15DR	59F, 21DR	vacant	Robert Henry; Goldsborough (F)	5F, 4DR	James Madison (DR) ✓
1816	Charles Carnan Ridgely (F)	John Montgomery (DR)	15DR	48F, 32DR	Robert Goodloe Harper (F)	Robert Henry; Goldsborough (F)	5F, 4DR	James Monroe (DR) ✓
1817	Charles Carnan Ridgely (F)	John Montgomery (DR)	15F	56F, 24DR	Alexander C. Hanson (F)	Robert Henry; Goldsborough (F)	5DR, 4F	James Monroe (DR) ✓
1818	Charles Carnan Ridgely (F)	Luther Martin (F)	15F	45DR, 35F	Alexander C. Hanson (F)	Robert Henry; Goldsborough (F)	5DR, 4F	James Monroe (DR) ✓
1819	Charles Goldsborough (F)	Luther Martin (F)	15F	45DR, 35F	Alexander C. Hanson (F)	Edward Lloyd (DR)	7DR, 2F	James Monroe (DR) ✓
1820	Samuel Sprigg (DR)	Luther Martin (F)	15F	50DR, 30F	William Pinkney (DR)	Edward Lloyd (DR)	7DR, 2F	James Monroe (DR) ✓
1821	Samuel Sprigg (DR)	Luther Martin (F)	15F	49DR, 31F	William Pinkney (DR)	Edward Lloyd (DR)	6DR, 3F	James Monroe (DR) ✓
1822	Samuel Sprigg (DR)	Thomas Beale Dorsey (DR)	15DR	63DR, 17F	vacant	Edward Lloyd (DR)	6DR, 3F	James Monroe (DR) ✓
1823	Samuel Stevens Jr. (DR)	Thomas Beale Dorsey (DR)	15DR	67DR, 13F	Samuel Smith (DR)	Edward Lloyd (DR)	4NR, 3F, 2DR	James Monroe (DR) ✓
1824	Samuel Stevens Jr. (DR)	Thomas Kell (DR)	15DR	63DR, 17F	Samuel Smith (DR)	Edward Lloyd (DR)	4NR, 3F, 2DR	Andrew Jackson (DR) ✗
1825	Samuel Stevens Jr. (DR)	Thomas Kell (DR)	15DR	[?]	Samuel Smith (J)	Edward Lloyd (J)	6NR, 3DR	Andrew Jackson (DR) ✗
1826	Joseph Kent (DR)	Thomas Kell (DR)	15DR	[?]	Samuel Smith (J)	Ezekiel F. Chambers (NR)	5NR, 4DR	Andrew Jackson (DR) ✗
1827	Joseph Kent (DR)	Roger B. Taney (J)	[?]	[?]	Samuel Smith (J)	Ezekiel F. Chambers (NR)	6NR, 3DR	Andrew Jackson (DR) ✗
1828	Joseph Kent (DR)	Roger B. Taney (J)	[?]	49NR, 31J	Samuel Smith (J)	Ezekiel F. Chambers (NR)	6NR, 3DR	John Quincy Adams and Richard Rush (NR) ✗
1829	Daniel Martin (NR)	Roger B. Taney (J)	[?]	48NR, 31J, 1 tie	Samuel Smith (J)	Ezekiel F. Chambers (NR)	6J, 3NR	John Quincy Adams and Richard Rush (NR) ✗
1830	Thomas King Carroll (J)	Roger B. Taney (J)	[?]	41NR, 39J	Samuel Smith (J)	Ezekiel F. Chambers (NR)	6J, 3NR	John Quincy Adams and Richard Rush (NR) ✗
1831	Daniel Martin (NR)	Josiah Bayly (J)	[?]	64NR, 16J	Samuel Smith (J)	Ezekiel F. Chambers (NR)	5NR, 4J	John Quincy Adams and Richard Rush (NR) ✗
1831	George Howard (NR)	Josiah Bayly (J)		64NR, 16J	Samuel Smith (J)	Ezekiel F. Chambers (NR)	5NR, 4J	John Quincy Adams and Richard Rush (NR) ✗
1832	George Howard (NR)	Josiah Bayly (J)	15NR	59NR, 21J	Samuel Smith (J)	Ezekiel F. Chambers (NR)	5NR, 4J	Henry Clay and John Sergeant (NR) ✗
1833	James Thomas (W)	Josiah Bayly (J)	15NR	54NR, 26J	Joseph Kent (NR)	Ezekiel F. Chambers (NR)	6J, 2NR	Henry Clay and John Sergeant (NR) ✗
1834	James Thomas (W)	Josiah Bayly (J)	15NR	42NR, 36J, 2Work	Joseph Kent (NR)	Ezekiel F. Chambers (NR)	6J, 2NR	Henry Clay and John Sergeant (NR) ✗
1835	James Thomas (W)	Josiah Bayly (J)	15NR	62W, 18D	Joseph Kent (NR)	Robert Henry; Goldsborough (NR)	4J, 4NR	Henry Clay and John Sergeant (NR) ✗
1836	Thomas Veazey (W)	Josiah Bayly (J)	15NR	55W, 25D	Joseph Kent (NR)	Robert Henry; Goldsborough (NR)	4J, 4NR	William Henry Harrison and John Tyler (W) ✗
1836	Thomas Veazey (W)	Josiah Bayly (J)	15NR	55W, 25D	Joseph Kent (NR)	John S. Spence (NR)	4J, 4NR	William Henry Harrison and John Tyler (W) ✗
1837	Thomas Veazey (W)	Josiah Bayly (D)	15W	60W, 20D	Joseph Kent (W)	John S. Spence (W)	5W, 3D	William Henry Harrison and John Tyler (W) ✗
1838	Thomas Veazey (W)	Josiah Bayly (D)	15W	51W, 35D	William Duhurst Merrick (W)	John S. Spence (W)	5W, 3D	William Henry Harrison and John Tyler (W) ✗
1839	William Grason (D)	Josiah Bayly (D)	12W, 9D	42W, 37D	William Duhurst Merrick (W)	John S. Spence (W)	5D, 3W	William Henry Harrison and John Tyler (W) ✗
1840	William Grason (D)	Josiah Bayly (D)	12W, 9D	46D, 33W	William Duhurst Merrick (W)	John S. Spence (W)	5D, 3W	William Henry Harrison and John Tyler (W) ✓
1841	William Grason (D)	Josiah Bayly (D)	15W, 6D	60W, 19D	William Duhurst Merrick (W)	John Leeds Kerr (W)	6W, 2D	William Henry Harrison and John Tyler (W) ✓
1842	Francis Thomas (D)	Josiah Bayly (D)	15W, 6D	44D, 35W	William Duhurst Merrick (W)	John Leeds Kerr (W)	6W, 2D	William Henry Harrison and John Tyler (W) ✓
1843	Francis Thomas (D)	Josiah Bayly (D)	13W, 8D	47D, 35W	William Duhurst Merrick (W)	James Pearce (W)	6W	William Henry Harrison and John Tyler (W) ✓
1844	Francis Thomas (D)	Josiah Bayly (D)	13W, 8D	47W, 35D	William Duhurst Merrick (W)	James Pearce (W)	6W	Henry Clay and Theodore Frelinghuysen (W) ✗
1845	Thomas Pratt (W)	Josiah Bayly (D)	15W, 6D	61W, 21D	Reverdy Johnson (W)	James Pearce (W)	4D, 2W	Henry Clay and Theodore Frelinghuysen (W) ✗
1846	Thomas Pratt (W)	George R. Richardson	15W, 6D	43W, 39D	Reverdy Johnson (W)	James Pearce (W)	4D, 2W	Henry Clay and Theodore Frelinghuysen (W) ✗
1847	Thomas Pratt (W)	George R. Richardson	13W, 8D	53W, 29D	Reverdy Johnson (W)	James Pearce (W)	4W, 2R	Henry Clay and Theodore Frelinghuysen (W) ✗
1848	Philip Francis Thomas (D)	George R. Richardson	13W, 8D	54W, 28D	Reverdy Johnson (W)	James Pearce (W)	4W, 2R	Zachary Taylor and Millard Fillmore (W) ✓
1849	Philip Francis Thomas (D)	George R. Richardson	14W, 7D	54W, 28D	vacant	James Pearce (W)	3W, 3D	Zachary Taylor and Millard Fillmore (W) ✓
1849	Philip Francis Thomas (D)	George R. Richardson	14W, 7D	54W, 28D	David Stewart (W) (Note: Appointed to fill position and served until a successor was elected.)	James Pearce (W)	3W, 3D	Zachary Taylor and Millard Fillmore (W) ✓
1850	Philip Francis Thomas (D)	George R. Richardson	14W, 7D	46W, 36D	Thomas Pratt (W)	James Pearce (W)	3W, 3D	Zachary Taylor and Millard Fillmore (W) ✓
1851	Enoch Louis Lowe (D)	Robert J. Brent (W)	12W, 9D	46W, 36D	Thomas Pratt (W)	James Pearce (W)	4W, 2D	Zachary Taylor and Millard Fillmore (W) ✓

== 1851–present ==
Year	Executive offices				General Assembly		United States Congress			Electoral votes
Year	Governor	Lieutenant Governor	Attorney General	Comptroller	State Senate	State House	U.S. Senator (Class I)	U.S. Senator (Class III)	U.S. House	Electoral votes
1851	Enoch Louis Lowe (D)	(Note: The office of Lieutenant Governor was created originally by the Constitution of 1864.)	(Note: The office of attorney general was abolished by the Constitution of 1851 but was reestablished by the Constitution of 1864 (Art. 5, sec. 1).)	Philip Francis Thomas (D)	12W, 9D	46W, 36D	Thomas Pratt (W)	James Pearce (W)	4W, 2D	
1852	Enoch Louis Lowe (D)	(Note: The office of Lieutenant Governor was created originally by the Constitution of 1864.)	(Note: The office of attorney general was abolished by the Constitution of 1851 but was reestablished by the Constitution of 1864 (Art. 5, sec. 1).)	Philip Francis Thomas (D)	11W, 11D	44D, 30W	Thomas Pratt (W)	James Pearce (W)	4W, 2D	Pierce/ King (D) ✓
1853	Enoch Louis Lowe (D)	(Note: The office of Lieutenant Governor was created originally by the Constitution of 1864.)	(Note: The office of attorney general was abolished by the Constitution of 1851 but was reestablished by the Constitution of 1864 (Art. 5, sec. 1).)	Philip Francis Thomas (D)	11W, 11D	44D, 30W	Thomas Pratt (W)	James Pearce (W)	4D, 2W	Pierce/ King (D) ✓
1853	Enoch Louis Lowe (D)	(Note: The office of Lieutenant Governor was created originally by the Constitution of 1864.)	(Note: The office of attorney general was abolished by the Constitution of 1851 but was reestablished by the Constitution of 1864 (Art. 5, sec. 1).)	Henry E. Bateman (D)	11W, 11D	44D, 30W	Thomas Pratt (W)	James Pearce (W)	4D, 2W	Pierce/ King (D) ✓
1854	Thomas Watkins Ligon (D)	(Note: The office of Lieutenant Governor was created originally by the Constitution of 1864.)	(Note: The office of attorney general was abolished by the Constitution of 1851 but was reestablished by the Constitution of 1864 (Art. 5, sec. 1).)	William Pinkney Whyte (D)	14W, 8D	34W, 30D, 10Temp	Thomas Pratt (W)	James Pearce (W)	4D, 2W	Pierce/ King (D) ✓
1855	Thomas Watkins Ligon (D)	(Note: The office of Lieutenant Governor was created originally by the Constitution of 1864.)	(Note: The office of attorney general was abolished by the Constitution of 1851 but was reestablished by the Constitution of 1864 (Art. 5, sec. 1).)	William Pinkney Whyte (D)	14W, 8D	34W, 30D, 10Temp	Thomas Pratt (W)	James Pearce (W)	4KN, 2D	Pierce/ King (D) ✓
1856	Thomas Watkins Ligon (D)	(Note: The office of Lieutenant Governor was created originally by the Constitution of 1864.)	(Note: The office of attorney general was abolished by the Constitution of 1851 but was reestablished by the Constitution of 1864 (Art. 5, sec. 1).)	William Henry Purnell (KN)	9W, 8KN, 5D	54KN, 14D, 6W	Thomas Pratt (W)	James Pearce (W)	4KN, 2D	Fillmore/ Donelson (KN) ✗
1857	Thomas Watkins Ligon (D)	(Note: The office of Lieutenant Governor was created originally by the Constitution of 1864.)	(Note: The office of attorney general was abolished by the Constitution of 1851 but was reestablished by the Constitution of 1864 (Art. 5, sec. 1).)	William Henry Purnell (KN)	9W, 8KN, 5D	54KN, 14D, 6W	Anthony Kennedy (KN)	James Pearce (D)	3KN, 3D	Fillmore/ Donelson (KN) ✗
1858	Thomas Holliday Hicks (KN)	(Note: The office of Lieutenant Governor was created originally by the Constitution of 1864.)	(Note: The office of attorney general was abolished by the Constitution of 1851 but was reestablished by the Constitution of 1864 (Art. 5, sec. 1).)	William Henry Purnell (KN)	15KN, 7D	44KN, 30D	Anthony Kennedy (KN)	James Pearce (D)	3KN, 3D	Fillmore/ Donelson (KN) ✗
1859	Thomas Holliday Hicks (KN)	(Note: The office of Lieutenant Governor was created originally by the Constitution of 1864.)	(Note: The office of attorney general was abolished by the Constitution of 1851 but was reestablished by the Constitution of 1864 (Art. 5, sec. 1).)	William Henry Purnell (KN)	15KN, 7D	44KN, 30D	Anthony Kennedy (KN)	James Pearce (D)	3KN, 3D	Fillmore/ Donelson (KN) ✗
1860	Thomas Holliday Hicks (KN)	(Note: The office of Lieutenant Governor was created originally by the Constitution of 1864.)	(Note: The office of attorney general was abolished by the Constitution of 1851 but was reestablished by the Constitution of 1864 (Art. 5, sec. 1).)	William Henry Purnell (KN)	12D, 10KN	45D, 29KN	Anthony Kennedy (KN)	James Pearce (D)	3KN, 3D	Breckinridge/ Lane (SD) ✗
1861	Thomas Holliday Hicks (KN)	(Note: The office of Lieutenant Governor was created originally by the Constitution of 1864.)	(Note: The office of attorney general was abolished by the Constitution of 1851 but was reestablished by the Constitution of 1864 (Art. 5, sec. 1).)	William Henry Purnell (KN)	12D, 10KN	45D, 29KN	Anthony Kennedy (KN)	James Pearce (D)	6NU	Breckinridge/ Lane (SD) ✗
1861	Thomas Holliday Hicks (KN)	(Note: The office of Lieutenant Governor was created originally by the Constitution of 1864.)	(Note: The office of attorney general was abolished by the Constitution of 1851 but was reestablished by the Constitution of 1864 (Art. 5, sec. 1).)	Dennis Claude (D)	12D, 10KN	45D, 29KN	Anthony Kennedy (KN)	James Pearce (D)	6NU	Breckinridge/ Lane (SD) ✗
1861	Thomas Holliday Hicks (KN)	(Note: The office of Lieutenant Governor was created originally by the Constitution of 1864.)	(Note: The office of attorney general was abolished by the Constitution of 1851 but was reestablished by the Constitution of 1864 (Art. 5, sec. 1).)	Abram Lingan Jarrett (D)	12D, 10KN	45D, 29KN	Anthony Kennedy (U)	James Pearce (D)	6NU	Breckinridge/ Lane (SD) ✗
1862	Augustus Bradford (NU)	(Note: The office of Lieutenant Governor was created originally by the Constitution of 1864.)	(Note: The office of attorney general was abolished by the Constitution of 1851 but was reestablished by the Constitution of 1864 (Art. 5, sec. 1).)	Samuel Snowden Maffit (NU)	13NU, 9D	68NU, 6D	Anthony Kennedy (U)	James Pearce (D)	6NU	Breckinridge/ Lane (SD) ✗
1863	Augustus Bradford (NU)	(Note: The office of Lieutenant Governor was created originally by the Constitution of 1864.)	(Note: The office of attorney general was abolished by the Constitution of 1851 but was reestablished by the Constitution of 1864 (Art. 5, sec. 1).)	Samuel Snowden Maffit (NU)	13NU, 9D	68NU, 6D	Reverdy Johnson (U)	Thomas Holliday Hicks (UU)	3NU, 1D, 1R	Breckinridge/ Lane (SD) ✗
1864	Augustus Bradford (NU)	(Note: The office of Lieutenant Governor was created originally by the Constitution of 1864.)	Alexander Randall (NU)	Henry H. Goldsborough (NU)	19NU, 3D	56NU, 18D	Reverdy Johnson (U)	Thomas Holliday Hicks (UU)	3NU, 1D, 1R	Lincoln/ Johnson (NU) ✓
1865	Augustus Bradford (NU)	Christopher Christian Cox (NU)	Alexander Randall (NU)	Robert John Jump (NU)	12D, 12NU	54NU, 26D	Reverdy Johnson (D)	John Creswell (UU)	3NU, 2D	Lincoln/ Johnson (NU) ✓
1866	Thomas Swann (D)	Christopher Christian Cox (NU)	Alexander Randall (NU)	Robert John Jump (NU)	12D, 12NU	54NU, 26D	Reverdy Johnson (D)	John Creswell (UU)	3NU, 2D	Lincoln/ Johnson (NU) ✓
1867	Thomas Swann (D)	Christopher Christian Cox (NU)	Isaac D. Jones (R)	William James Leonard (D)	16D, 8R	59D, 21R	Reverdy Johnson (D)	vacant	3D, 1C, 1R	Lincoln/ Johnson (NU) ✓
1868	Thomas Swann (D)	(Note: The state's present constitution, adopted in 1867, abolished the lieutenant governorship. However, the position was re-established by a constitutional amendment ratified on November 4, 1970.)	Isaac D. Jones (R)	William James Leonard (D)	25D	86D	Reverdy Johnson (D)	George Vickers (D)	3D, 1C, 1R	Seymour/ Blair (D) ✗
1868	Thomas Swann (D)	(Note: The state's present constitution, adopted in 1867, abolished the lieutenant governorship. However, the position was re-established by a constitutional amendment ratified on November 4, 1970.)	Isaac D. Jones (R)	William James Leonard (D)	25D	86D	William Pinkney Whyte (D)	George Vickers (D)	3D, 1C, 1R	Seymour/ Blair (D) ✗
1869	Oden Bowie (D)	(Note: The state's present constitution, adopted in 1867, abolished the lieutenant governorship. However, the position was re-established by a constitutional amendment ratified on November 4, 1970.)	Isaac D. Jones (R)	William James Leonard (D)	25D	86D	William T. Hamilton (D)	George Vickers (D)	5D	Seymour/ Blair (D) ✗
1870	Oden Bowie (D)	(Note: The state's present constitution, adopted in 1867, abolished the lieutenant governorship. However, the position was re-established by a constitutional amendment ratified on November 4, 1970.)	Isaac D. Jones (R)	Levin Woolford (D)	25D	86D	William T. Hamilton (D)	George Vickers (D)	5D	Seymour/ Blair (D) ✗
1871	Oden Bowie (D)	(Note: The state's present constitution, adopted in 1867, abolished the lieutenant governorship. However, the position was re-established by a constitutional amendment ratified on November 4, 1970.)	Andrew K. Syester (D)	Levin Woolford (D)	25D	86D	William T. Hamilton (D)	George Vickers (D)	5D	Seymour/ Blair (D) ✗
1872	William Pinkney Whyte (D)	(Note: The state's present constitution, adopted in 1867, abolished the lieutenant governorship. However, the position was re-established by a constitutional amendment ratified on November 4, 1970.)	Andrew K. Syester (D)	Levin Woolford (D)	24D, 1R	70D, 12R	William T. Hamilton (D)	George Vickers (D)	5D	Hendricks/ Brown (D) ✗
1873	William Pinkney Whyte (D)	(Note: The state's present constitution, adopted in 1867, abolished the lieutenant governorship. However, the position was re-established by a constitutional amendment ratified on November 4, 1970.)	Andrew K. Syester (D)	Levin Woolford (D)	24D, 1R	70D, 12R	William T. Hamilton (D)	George R. Dennis (D)	4D, 2R	Hendricks/ Brown (D) ✗
1874	James Black Groome (D)	(Note: The state's present constitution, adopted in 1867, abolished the lieutenant governorship. However, the position was re-established by a constitutional amendment ratified on November 4, 1970.)	Andrew K. Syester (D)	Levin Woolford (D)	23D, 3R	64D, 20R	William T. Hamilton (D)	George R. Dennis (D)	4D, 2R	Hendricks/ Brown (D) ✗
1875	James Black Groome (D)	(Note: The state's present constitution, adopted in 1867, abolished the lieutenant governorship. However, the position was re-established by a constitutional amendment ratified on November 4, 1970.)	Charles J. M. Gwinn (D)	Levin Woolford (D)	23D, 3R	64D, 20R	William Pinkney Whyte (D)	George R. Dennis (D)	6D	Hendricks/ Brown (D) ✗
1876	John Lee Carroll (D)	(Note: The state's present constitution, adopted in 1867, abolished the lieutenant governorship. However, the position was re-established by a constitutional amendment ratified on November 4, 1970.)	Charles J. M. Gwinn (D)	Levin Woolford (D)	19D, 7R	58D, 26R	William Pinkney Whyte (D)	George R. Dennis (D)	6D	Tilden/ Hendricks (D) ✗
1877	John Lee Carroll (D)	(Note: The state's present constitution, adopted in 1867, abolished the lieutenant governorship. However, the position was re-established by a constitutional amendment ratified on November 4, 1970.)	Charles J. M. Gwinn (D)	Levin Woolford (D)	19D, 7R	58D, 26R	William Pinkney Whyte (D)	George R. Dennis (D)	6D	Tilden/ Hendricks (D) ✗
1878	John Lee Carroll (D)	(Note: The state's present constitution, adopted in 1867, abolished the lieutenant governorship. However, the position was re-established by a constitutional amendment ratified on November 4, 1970.)	Charles J. M. Gwinn (D)	Thomas James Keating (D)	18D, 5R, 2ID, 1Ref	65D, 19R	William Pinkney Whyte (D)	George R. Dennis (D)	6D	Tilden/ Hendricks (D) ✗
1879	John Lee Carroll (D)	(Note: The state's present constitution, adopted in 1867, abolished the lieutenant governorship. However, the position was re-established by a constitutional amendment ratified on November 4, 1970.)	Charles J. M. Gwinn (D)	Thomas James Keating (D)	18D, 5R, 2ID, 1Ref	65D, 19R	William Pinkney Whyte (D)	James Black Groome (D)	5D, 1R	Tilden/ Hendricks (D) ✗
1880	William T. Hamilton (D)	(Note: The state's present constitution, adopted in 1867, abolished the lieutenant governorship. However, the position was re-established by a constitutional amendment ratified on November 4, 1970.)	Charles J. M. Gwinn (D)	Thomas James Keating (D)	19D, 7R	63D, 21R	William Pinkney Whyte (D)	James Black Groome (D)	5D, 1R	Hancock/ English (D) ✗
1881	William T. Hamilton (D)	(Note: The state's present constitution, adopted in 1867, abolished the lieutenant governorship. However, the position was re-established by a constitutional amendment ratified on November 4, 1970.)	Charles J. M. Gwinn (D)	Thomas James Keating (D)	19D, 7R	63D, 21R	Arthur P. Gorman (D)	James Black Groome (D)	5D, 1R	Hancock/ English (D) ✗
1882	William T. Hamilton (D)	(Note: The state's present constitution, adopted in 1867, abolished the lieutenant governorship. However, the position was re-established by a constitutional amendment ratified on November 4, 1970.)	Charles J. M. Gwinn (D)	Thomas James Keating (D)	16D, 10R	60D, 31R	Arthur P. Gorman (D)	James Black Groome (D)	5D, 1R	Hancock/ English (D) ✗
1883	William T. Hamilton (D)	(Note: The state's present constitution, adopted in 1867, abolished the lieutenant governorship. However, the position was re-established by a constitutional amendment ratified on November 4, 1970.)	Charles B. Roberts (D)	Thomas James Keating (D)	16D, 10R	60D, 31R	Arthur P. Gorman (D)	James Black Groome (D)	4D, 1R	Hancock/ English (D) ✗
1884	Robert Milligan McLane (D) (Note: Resigned to take post as Minister to France.)	(Note: The state's present constitution, adopted in 1867, abolished the lieutenant governorship. However, the position was re-established by a constitutional amendment ratified on November 4, 1970.)	Charles B. Roberts (D)	J. Frank Turner (D)	14D, 12R	63D, 28R	Arthur P. Gorman (D)	James Black Groome (D)	4D, 1R	Cleveland/ Hendricks (D) ✓
1885	Henry Lloyd (D) (Note: Appointed by the legislature to fill unexpired term; was later elected in his own right.)	(Note: The state's present constitution, adopted in 1867, abolished the lieutenant governorship. However, the position was re-established by a constitutional amendment ratified on November 4, 1970.)	Charles B. Roberts (D)	J. Frank Turner (D)	14D, 12R	63D, 28R	Arthur P. Gorman (D)	Ephraim K. Wilson II (D)	5D, 1R	Cleveland/ Hendricks (D) ✓
1886	Henry Lloyd (D)	(Note: The state's present constitution, adopted in 1867, abolished the lieutenant governorship. However, the position was re-established by a constitutional amendment ratified on November 4, 1970.)	Charles B. Roberts (D)	J. Frank Turner (D)	22D, 4R	80D, 10R, 1Fus	Arthur P. Gorman (D)	Ephraim K. Wilson II (D)	5D, 1R	Cleveland/ Hendricks (D) ✓
1887	Henry Lloyd (D)	(Note: The state's present constitution, adopted in 1867, abolished the lieutenant governorship. However, the position was re-established by a constitutional amendment ratified on November 4, 1970.)	William Pinkney Whyte (D)	J. Frank Turner (D)	22D, 4R	80D, 10R, 1Fus	Arthur P. Gorman (D)	Ephraim K. Wilson II (D)	5D, 1R	Cleveland/ Hendricks (D) ✓
1888	Elihu Emory Jackson (D)	(Note: The state's present constitution, adopted in 1867, abolished the lieutenant governorship. However, the position was re-established by a constitutional amendment ratified on November 4, 1970.)	William Pinkney Whyte (D)	L. Victor Baughman (D)	22D, 4R	71D, 20R	Arthur P. Gorman (D)	Ephraim K. Wilson II (D)	5D, 1R	Cleveland/ Thurman (D) ✗
1889	Elihu Emory Jackson (D)	(Note: The state's present constitution, adopted in 1867, abolished the lieutenant governorship. However, the position was re-established by a constitutional amendment ratified on November 4, 1970.)	William Pinkney Whyte (D)	L. Victor Baughman (D)	22D, 4R	71D, 20R	Arthur P. Gorman (D)	Ephraim K. Wilson II (D)	4D, 2R	Cleveland/ Thurman (D) ✗
1890	Elihu Emory Jackson (D)	(Note: The state's present constitution, adopted in 1867, abolished the lieutenant governorship. However, the position was re-established by a constitutional amendment ratified on November 4, 1970.)	William Pinkney Whyte (D)	L. Victor Baughman (D)	18D, 8R	59D, 32R	Arthur P. Gorman (D)	Ephraim K. Wilson II (D)	3D, 3R	Cleveland/ Thurman (D) ✗
1891	Elihu Emory Jackson (D)	(Note: The state's present constitution, adopted in 1867, abolished the lieutenant governorship. However, the position was re-established by a constitutional amendment ratified on November 4, 1970.)	John Prentiss Poe (D)	L. Victor Baughman (D)	18D, 8R	59D, 32R	Arthur P. Gorman (D)	vacant	6D	Cleveland/ Thurman (D) ✗
1892	Frank Brown (D)	(Note: The state's present constitution, adopted in 1867, abolished the lieutenant governorship. However, the position was re-established by a constitutional amendment ratified on November 4, 1970.)	John Prentiss Poe (D)	Marion deKalb Smith (D)	22D, 4R	81D, 7R, 3Fus	Arthur P. Gorman (D)	Charles H. Gibson (D)	6D	Cleveland/ Stevenson (D) ✓
1893	Frank Brown (D)	(Note: The state's present constitution, adopted in 1867, abolished the lieutenant governorship. However, the position was re-established by a constitutional amendment ratified on November 4, 1970.)	John Prentiss Poe (D)	Marion deKalb Smith (D)	22D, 4R	81D, 7R, 3Fus	Arthur P. Gorman (D)	Charles H. Gibson (D)	6D	Cleveland/ Stevenson (D) ✓
1894	Frank Brown (D)	(Note: The state's present constitution, adopted in 1867, abolished the lieutenant governorship. However, the position was re-established by a constitutional amendment ratified on November 4, 1970.)	John Prentiss Poe (D)	Marion deKalb Smith (D)	21D, 5R	68D, 23R	Arthur P. Gorman (D)	Charles H. Gibson (D)	5D, 1R	Cleveland/ Stevenson (D) ✓
1895	Frank Brown (D)	(Note: The state's present constitution, adopted in 1867, abolished the lieutenant governorship. However, the position was re-established by a constitutional amendment ratified on November 4, 1970.)	Harry M. Clabaugh (R)	Marion deKalb Smith (D)	21D, 5R	68D, 23R	Arthur P. Gorman (D)	Charles H. Gibson (D)	3D, 3R	Cleveland/ Stevenson (D) ✓
1896	Lloyd Lowndes Jr. (R)	(Note: The state's present constitution, adopted in 1867, abolished the lieutenant governorship. However, the position was re-established by a constitutional amendment ratified on November 4, 1970.)	Harry M. Clabaugh (R)	Robert Patterson Graham (R)	13D, 13R	70R, 21D	Arthur P. Gorman (D)	Charles H. Gibson (D)	3D, 3R	McKinley/ Hobart (R) ✓
1897	Lloyd Lowndes Jr. (R)	(Note: The state's present constitution, adopted in 1867, abolished the lieutenant governorship. However, the position was re-established by a constitutional amendment ratified on November 4, 1970.)	Harry M. Clabaugh (R)	Robert Patterson Graham (R)	14D, 12R	70R, 21D	Arthur P. Gorman (D)	George L. Wellington (R)	6R	McKinley/ Hobart (R) ✓
1898	Lloyd Lowndes Jr. (R)	(Note: The state's present constitution, adopted in 1867, abolished the lieutenant governorship. However, the position was re-established by a constitutional amendment ratified on November 4, 1970.)	Harry M. Clabaugh (R)	Phillips Lee Goldsborough (R)	18R, 8D	49R, 42D	Arthur P. Gorman (D)	George L. Wellington (R)	6R	McKinley/ Hobart (R) ✓
1899	Lloyd Lowndes Jr. (R)	(Note: The state's present constitution, adopted in 1867, abolished the lieutenant governorship. However, the position was re-established by a constitutional amendment ratified on November 4, 1970.)	George R. Gaither (R)	Phillips Lee Goldsborough (R)	18R, 8D	49R, 42D	Louis E. McComas (R)	George L. Wellington (R)	4R, 2D	McKinley/ Hobart (R) ✓
1899	Lloyd Lowndes Jr. (R)	(Note: The state's present constitution, adopted in 1867, abolished the lieutenant governorship. However, the position was re-established by a constitutional amendment ratified on November 4, 1970.)	Isidor Rayner (D)	Phillips Lee Goldsborough (R)	18R, 8D	49R, 42D	Louis E. McComas (R)	George L. Wellington (R)	4R, 2D	McKinley/ Hobart (R) ✓
1900	John Walter Smith (D)	(Note: The state's present constitution, adopted in 1867, abolished the lieutenant governorship. However, the position was re-established by a constitutional amendment ratified on November 4, 1970.)	Isidor Rayner (D)	Joshua W. Hering (D)	15D, 11R	65D, 26R	Louis E. McComas (R)	George L. Wellington (R)	5R, 1D (Note: Josiah Kerr elected to fill vacancy upon Smith's resignation upon election as governor.)	McKinley/ Roosevelt (R) ✓
1901	John Walter Smith (D)	(Note: The state's present constitution, adopted in 1867, abolished the lieutenant governorship. However, the position was re-established by a constitutional amendment ratified on November 4, 1970.)	Isidor Rayner (D)	Joshua W. Hering (D)	15D, 11R	65D, 26R	Louis E. McComas (R)	George L. Wellington (R)	6R	McKinley/ Roosevelt (R) ✓
1902	John Walter Smith (D)	(Note: The state's present constitution, adopted in 1867, abolished the lieutenant governorship. However, the position was re-established by a constitutional amendment ratified on November 4, 1970.)	Isidor Rayner (D)	Joshua W. Hering (D)	17D, 9R	51D, 44R	Louis E. McComas (R)	George L. Wellington (R)	6R	McKinley/ Roosevelt (R) ✓
1903	John Walter Smith (D)	(Note: The state's present constitution, adopted in 1867, abolished the lieutenant governorship. However, the position was re-established by a constitutional amendment ratified on November 4, 1970.)	William S. Bryan (D)	Joshua W. Hering (D)	17D, 9R	51D, 44R	Louis E. McComas (R)	Arthur P. Gorman (D)	4R, 2D	McKinley/ Roosevelt (R) ✓
1904	Edwin Warfield (D)	(Note: The state's present constitution, adopted in 1867, abolished the lieutenant governorship. However, the position was re-established by a constitutional amendment ratified on November 4, 1970.)	William S. Bryan (D)	Gordon T. Atkinson (D)	19D, 8R	71D, 30R	Louis E. McComas (R)	Arthur P. Gorman (D)	4R, 2D	Roosevelt/ Fairbanks (R) ✓
1905	Edwin Warfield (D)	(Note: The state's present constitution, adopted in 1867, abolished the lieutenant governorship. However, the position was re-established by a constitutional amendment ratified on November 4, 1970.)	William S. Bryan (D)	Gordon T. Atkinson (D)	19D, 8R	71D, 30R	Isidor Rayner (D)	Arthur P. Gorman (D)	3R, 3D	Roosevelt/ Fairbanks (R) ✓
1906	Edwin Warfield (D)	(Note: The state's present constitution, adopted in 1867, abolished the lieutenant governorship. However, the position was re-established by a constitutional amendment ratified on November 4, 1970.)	William S. Bryan (D)	Gordon T. Atkinson (D)	18D, 8R, 1I	51D, 46R, 3I, 1Fus	Isidor Rayner (D)	Arthur P. Gorman (D)	3R, 3D	Roosevelt/ Fairbanks (R) ✓
1906	Edwin Warfield (D)	(Note: The state's present constitution, adopted in 1867, abolished the lieutenant governorship. However, the position was re-established by a constitutional amendment ratified on November 4, 1970.)	William S. Bryan (D)	Gordon T. Atkinson (D)	18D, 8R, 1I	51D, 46R, 3I, 1Fus	Isidor Rayner (D)	William Pinkney Whyte (D)	3R, 3D	Roosevelt/ Fairbanks (R) ✓
1907	Edwin Warfield (D)	(Note: The state's present constitution, adopted in 1867, abolished the lieutenant governorship. However, the position was re-established by a constitutional amendment ratified on November 4, 1970.)	Isaac Lobe Straus (D)	Gordon T. Atkinson (D)	18D, 8R, 1I	51D, 46R, 3I, 1Fus	Isidor Rayner (D)	William Pinkney Whyte (D)	3R, 3D	Roosevelt/ Fairbanks (R) ✓
1908	Austin Lane Crothers (D)	(Note: The state's present constitution, adopted in 1867, abolished the lieutenant governorship. However, the position was re-established by a constitutional amendment ratified on November 4, 1970.)	Isaac Lobe Straus (D)	Joshua W. Hering (D)	17D, 9R, 1I	71D, 30R	Isidor Rayner (D)	John Walter Smith (D)	3R, 3D	Bryan/ Kern (D) ✗
1909	Austin Lane Crothers (D)	(Note: The state's present constitution, adopted in 1867, abolished the lieutenant governorship. However, the position was re-established by a constitutional amendment ratified on November 4, 1970.)	Isaac Lobe Straus (D)	Joshua W. Hering (D)	17D, 9R, 1I	71D, 30R	Isidor Rayner (D)	John Walter Smith (D)	3R, 3D	Bryan/ Kern (D) ✗
1910	Austin Lane Crothers (D)	(Note: The state's present constitution, adopted in 1867, abolished the lieutenant governorship. However, the position was re-established by a constitutional amendment ratified on November 4, 1970.)	Isaac Lobe Straus (D)	Joshua W. Hering (D)	21D, 6R	70D, 31R	Isidor Rayner (D)	John Walter Smith (D)	3R, 3D	Bryan/ Kern (D) ✗
1910	Austin Lane Crothers (D)	(Note: The state's present constitution, adopted in 1867, abolished the lieutenant governorship. However, the position was re-established by a constitutional amendment ratified on November 4, 1970.)	Isaac Lobe Straus (D)	William B. Clagett (D) (Note: Appointed by Gov. Crothers; died in office.)	21D, 6R	70D, 31R	Isidor Rayner (D)	John Walter Smith (D)	3R, 3D	Bryan/ Kern (D) ✗
1911	Austin Lane Crothers (D)	(Note: The state's present constitution, adopted in 1867, abolished the lieutenant governorship. However, the position was re-established by a constitutional amendment ratified on November 4, 1970.)	Edgar Allan Poe (D)	William B. Clagett (D)	21D, 6R	70D, 31R	Isidor Rayner (D)	John Walter Smith (D)	5D, 1R	Bryan/ Kern (D) ✗
1911	Austin Lane Crothers (D)	(Note: The state's present constitution, adopted in 1867, abolished the lieutenant governorship. However, the position was re-established by a constitutional amendment ratified on November 4, 1970.)	Edgar Allan Poe (D)	Charles H. Stanley (D) (Note: Appointed by Gov. Crothers.)	21D, 6R	70D, 31R	Isidor Rayner (D)	John Walter Smith (D)	5D, 1R	Bryan/ Kern (D) ✗
1912	Phillips Lee Goldsborough (R)	(Note: The state's present constitution, adopted in 1867, abolished the lieutenant governorship. However, the position was re-established by a constitutional amendment ratified on November 4, 1970.)	Edgar Allan Poe (D)	Emerson Harrington (D)	19D, 8R	60D, 41R	Isidor Rayner (D)	John Walter Smith (D)	5D, 1R	Wilson/ Marshall (D) ✓
1913	Phillips Lee Goldsborough (R)	(Note: The state's present constitution, adopted in 1867, abolished the lieutenant governorship. However, the position was re-established by a constitutional amendment ratified on November 4, 1970.)	Edgar Allan Poe (D)	Emerson Harrington (D)	19D, 8R	60D, 41R	William P. Jackson (R)	John Walter Smith (D)	6D	Wilson/ Marshall (D) ✓
1914	Phillips Lee Goldsborough (R)	(Note: The state's present constitution, adopted in 1867, abolished the lieutenant governorship. However, the position was re-established by a constitutional amendment ratified on November 4, 1970.)	Edgar Allan Poe (D)	Emerson Harrington (D)	18D, 9R	79D, 23R	Blair Lee I (D)	John Walter Smith (D)	6D	Wilson/ Marshall (D) ✓
1915	Phillips Lee Goldsborough (R)	(Note: The state's present constitution, adopted in 1867, abolished the lieutenant governorship. However, the position was re-established by a constitutional amendment ratified on November 4, 1970.)	Albert Ritchie (D)	Emerson Harrington (D)	18D, 9R	79D, 23R	Blair Lee I (D)	John Walter Smith (D)	5D, 1R	Wilson/ Marshall (D) ✓
1916	Emerson Harrington (D)	(Note: The state's present constitution, adopted in 1867, abolished the lieutenant governorship. However, the position was re-established by a constitutional amendment ratified on November 4, 1970.)	Albert Ritchie (D)	Hugh A. McMullen (D)	16D, 11R	56D, 44R, 2Pop	Blair Lee I (D)	John Walter Smith (D)	5D, 1R	Wilson/ Marshall (D) ✓
1917	Emerson Harrington (D)	(Note: The state's present constitution, adopted in 1867, abolished the lieutenant governorship. However, the position was re-established by a constitutional amendment ratified on November 4, 1970.)	Albert Ritchie (D)	Hugh A. McMullen (D)	16D, 11R	56D, 44R, 2Pop	Joseph I. France (R)	John Walter Smith (D)	4D, 2R	Wilson/ Marshall (D) ✓
1918	Emerson Harrington (D)	(Note: The state's present constitution, adopted in 1867, abolished the lieutenant governorship. However, the position was re-established by a constitutional amendment ratified on November 4, 1970.)	Albert Ritchie (D)	Hugh A. McMullen (D)	14D, 13R	55R, 47D	Joseph I. France (R)	John Walter Smith (D)	4D, 2R	Wilson/ Marshall (D) ✓
1919	Emerson Harrington (D)	(Note: The state's present constitution, adopted in 1867, abolished the lieutenant governorship. However, the position was re-established by a constitutional amendment ratified on November 4, 1970.)	Alexander Armstrong (R)	Hugh A. McMullen (D)	14D, 13R	55R, 47D	Joseph I. France (R)	John Walter Smith (D)	3D, 3R	Wilson/ Marshall (D) ✓
1920	Albert Ritchie (D)	(Note: The state's present constitution, adopted in 1867, abolished the lieutenant governorship. However, the position was re-established by a constitutional amendment ratified on November 4, 1970.)	Alexander Armstrong (R)	E. Brooke Lee (D)	15D, 12R	56D, 46R	Joseph I. France (R)	John Walter Smith (D)	3D, 3R	Harding/ Coolidge (R) ✓
1921	Albert Ritchie (D)	(Note: The state's present constitution, adopted in 1867, abolished the lieutenant governorship. However, the position was re-established by a constitutional amendment ratified on November 4, 1970.)	Alexander Armstrong (R)	E. Brooke Lee (D)	15D, 12R	56D, 46R	Joseph I. France (R)	Ovington Weller (R)	4R, 2D	Harding/ Coolidge (R) ✓
1922	Albert Ritchie (D)	(Note: The state's present constitution, adopted in 1867, abolished the lieutenant governorship. However, the position was re-established by a constitutional amendment ratified on November 4, 1970.)	Alexander Armstrong (R)	William Gordy (D)	21D, 6R	73D, 33R	Joseph I. France (R)	Ovington Weller (R)	4R, 2D	Harding/ Coolidge (R) ✓
1923	Albert Ritchie (D)	(Note: The state's present constitution, adopted in 1867, abolished the lieutenant governorship. However, the position was re-established by a constitutional amendment ratified on November 4, 1970.)	Thomas H. Robinson (D)	William Gordy (D)	21D, 6R	73D, 33R	William Cabell Bruce (D)	Ovington Weller (R)	3R, 3D	Harding/ Coolidge (R) ✓
1924	Albert Ritchie (D)	(Note: The state's present constitution, adopted in 1867, abolished the lieutenant governorship. However, the position was re-established by a constitutional amendment ratified on November 4, 1970.)	Thomas H. Robinson (D)	William Gordy (D)	22D, 7R	93D, 25R	William Cabell Bruce (D)	Ovington Weller (R)	3R, 3D	Coolidge/ Dawes (R) ✓
1925	Albert Ritchie (D)	(Note: The state's present constitution, adopted in 1867, abolished the lieutenant governorship. However, the position was re-established by a constitutional amendment ratified on November 4, 1970.)	Thomas H. Robinson (D)	William Gordy (D)	22D, 7R	93D, 25R	William Cabell Bruce (D)	Ovington Weller (R)	4D, 2R	Coolidge/ Dawes (R) ✓
1926	Albert Ritchie (D)	(Note: The state's present constitution, adopted in 1867, abolished the lieutenant governorship. However, the position was re-established by a constitutional amendment ratified on November 4, 1970.)	Thomas H. Robinson (D)	William Gordy (D)	22D, 7R	93D, 25R	William Cabell Bruce (D)	Ovington Weller (R)	4D, 2R	Coolidge/ Dawes (R) ✓
1927	Albert Ritchie (D)	(Note: The state's present constitution, adopted in 1867, abolished the lieutenant governorship. However, the position was re-established by a constitutional amendment ratified on November 4, 1970.)	Thomas H. Robinson (D)	William Gordy (D)	21D, 8R (Note: After 3-year terms in 1923, every seat in both chambers of the General Assembly has been elected to 4-year terms, starting with the 1926 elections.)	82D, 36R	William Cabell Bruce (D)	Millard Tydings (D)	5D, 1R	Coolidge/ Dawes (R) ✓
1928	Albert Ritchie (D)	(Note: The state's present constitution, adopted in 1867, abolished the lieutenant governorship. However, the position was re-established by a constitutional amendment ratified on November 4, 1970.)	Thomas H. Robinson (D)	William Gordy (D)	21D, 8R	82D, 36R	William Cabell Bruce (D)	Millard Tydings (D)	5D, 1R	Hoover/ Curtis (R) ✓
1929	Albert Ritchie (D)	(Note: The state's present constitution, adopted in 1867, abolished the lieutenant governorship. However, the position was re-established by a constitutional amendment ratified on November 4, 1970.)	Thomas H. Robinson (D)	William Gordy (D)	21D, 8R	82D, 36R	Phillips Lee Goldsborough (R)	Millard Tydings (D)	4D, 2R	Hoover/ Curtis (R) ✓
1930	Albert Ritchie (D)	(Note: The state's present constitution, adopted in 1867, abolished the lieutenant governorship. However, the position was re-established by a constitutional amendment ratified on November 4, 1970.)	William Preston Lane Jr. (D)	William Gordy (D)	21D, 8R	82D, 36R	Phillips Lee Goldsborough (R)	Millard Tydings (D)	4D, 2R	Hoover/ Curtis (R) ✓
1931	Albert Ritchie (D)	(Note: The state's present constitution, adopted in 1867, abolished the lieutenant governorship. However, the position was re-established by a constitutional amendment ratified on November 4, 1970.)	William Preston Lane Jr. (D)	William Gordy (D)	23D, 6R	91D, 27R	Phillips Lee Goldsborough (R)	Millard Tydings (D)	6D	Hoover/ Curtis (R) ✓
1932	Albert Ritchie (D)	(Note: The state's present constitution, adopted in 1867, abolished the lieutenant governorship. However, the position was re-established by a constitutional amendment ratified on November 4, 1970.)	William Preston Lane Jr. (D)	William Gordy (D)	23D, 6R	91D, 27R	Phillips Lee Goldsborough (R)	Millard Tydings (D)	6D	Roosevelt/ Garner (D) ✓
1933	Albert Ritchie (D)	(Note: The state's present constitution, adopted in 1867, abolished the lieutenant governorship. However, the position was re-established by a constitutional amendment ratified on November 4, 1970.)	William Preston Lane Jr. (D)	William Gordy (D)	23D, 6R	91D, 27R	Phillips Lee Goldsborough (R)	Millard Tydings (D)	6D	Roosevelt/ Garner (D) ✓
1934	Albert Ritchie (D)	(Note: The state's present constitution, adopted in 1867, abolished the lieutenant governorship. However, the position was re-established by a constitutional amendment ratified on November 4, 1970.)	Herbert O'Conor (D)	William Gordy (D)	23D, 6R	91D, 27R	Phillips Lee Goldsborough (R)	Millard Tydings (D)	6D	Roosevelt/ Garner (D) ✓
1935	Harry Nice (R)	(Note: The state's present constitution, adopted in 1867, abolished the lieutenant governorship. However, the position was re-established by a constitutional amendment ratified on November 4, 1970.)	Herbert O'Conor (D)	William Gordy (D)	18D, 11R	94D, 34R, 2Fus	George L. P. Radcliffe (D)	Millard Tydings (D)	6D	Roosevelt/ Garner (D) ✓
1936	Harry Nice (R)	(Note: The state's present constitution, adopted in 1867, abolished the lieutenant governorship. However, the position was re-established by a constitutional amendment ratified on November 4, 1970.)	Herbert O'Conor (D)	William Gordy (D)	18D, 11R	94D, 34R, 2Fus	George L. P. Radcliffe (D)	Millard Tydings (D)	6D	Roosevelt/ Garner (D) ✓
1937	Harry Nice (R)	(Note: The state's present constitution, adopted in 1867, abolished the lieutenant governorship. However, the position was re-established by a constitutional amendment ratified on November 4, 1970.)	Herbert O'Conor (D)	William Gordy (D)	18D, 11R	94D, 34R, 2Fus	George L. P. Radcliffe (D)	Millard Tydings (D)	6D	Roosevelt/ Garner (D) ✓
1938	Harry Nice (R)	(Note: The state's present constitution, adopted in 1867, abolished the lieutenant governorship. However, the position was re-established by a constitutional amendment ratified on November 4, 1970.)	William C. Walsh (D)	William Gordy (D)	18D, 11R	94D, 34R, 2Fus	George L. P. Radcliffe (D)	Millard Tydings (D)	6D	Roosevelt/ Garner (D) ✓
1939	Herbert O'Conor (D)	(Note: The state's present constitution, adopted in 1867, abolished the lieutenant governorship. However, the position was re-established by a constitutional amendment ratified on November 4, 1970.)	William C. Walsh (D)	J. Millard Tawes (D)	23D, 6R	104D, 16R	George L. P. Radcliffe (D)	Millard Tydings (D)	6D	Roosevelt/ Garner (D) ✓
1940	Herbert O'Conor (D)	(Note: The state's present constitution, adopted in 1867, abolished the lieutenant governorship. However, the position was re-established by a constitutional amendment ratified on November 4, 1970.)	William C. Walsh (D)	J. Millard Tawes (D)	23D, 6R	104D, 16R	George L. P. Radcliffe (D)	Millard Tydings (D)	6D	Roosevelt/ Wallace (D) ✓
1941	Herbert O'Conor (D)	(Note: The state's present constitution, adopted in 1867, abolished the lieutenant governorship. However, the position was re-established by a constitutional amendment ratified on November 4, 1970.)	William C. Walsh (D)	J. Millard Tawes (D)	23D, 6R	104D, 16R	George L. P. Radcliffe (D)	Millard Tydings (D)	6D	Roosevelt/ Wallace (D) ✓
1942	Herbert O'Conor (D)	(Note: The state's present constitution, adopted in 1867, abolished the lieutenant governorship. However, the position was re-established by a constitutional amendment ratified on November 4, 1970.)	William C. Walsh (D)	J. Millard Tawes (D)	23D, 6R	104D, 16R	George L. P. Radcliffe (D)	Millard Tydings (D)	6D	Roosevelt/ Wallace (D) ✓
1943	Herbert O'Conor (D)	(Note: The state's present constitution, adopted in 1867, abolished the lieutenant governorship. However, the position was re-established by a constitutional amendment ratified on November 4, 1970.)	William C. Walsh (D)	J. Millard Tawes (D)	20D, 9R	101D, 22R	George L. P. Radcliffe (D)	Millard Tydings (D)	4D, 2R	Roosevelt/ Wallace (D) ✓
1944	Herbert O'Conor (D)	(Note: The state's present constitution, adopted in 1867, abolished the lieutenant governorship. However, the position was re-established by a constitutional amendment ratified on November 4, 1970.)	William C. Walsh (D)	J. Millard Tawes (D)	20D, 9R	101D, 22R	George L. P. Radcliffe (D)	Millard Tydings (D)	4D, 2R	Roosevelt/ Truman (D) ✓
1945	Herbert O'Conor (D)	(Note: The state's present constitution, adopted in 1867, abolished the lieutenant governorship. However, the position was re-established by a constitutional amendment ratified on November 4, 1970.)	William Curran (D)	J. Millard Tawes (D)	20D, 9R	101D, 22R	George L. P. Radcliffe (D)	Millard Tydings (D)	5D, 1R	Roosevelt/ Truman (D) ✓
1946	Herbert O'Conor (D)	(Note: The state's present constitution, adopted in 1867, abolished the lieutenant governorship. However, the position was re-established by a constitutional amendment ratified on November 4, 1970.)	Hall Hammond (D)	J. Millard Tawes (D)	20D, 9R	101D, 22R	George L. P. Radcliffe (D)	Millard Tydings (D)	5D, 1R	Roosevelt/ Truman (D) ✓
1947	William Preston Lane Jr. (D)	(Note: The state's present constitution, adopted in 1867, abolished the lieutenant governorship. However, the position was re-established by a constitutional amendment ratified on November 4, 1970.)	Hall Hammond (D)	James J. Lacy (D)	18D, 11R	87D, 36R	Herbert O'Conor (D)	Millard Tydings (D)	4D, 2R	Roosevelt/ Truman (D) ✓
1948	William Preston Lane Jr. (D)	(Note: The state's present constitution, adopted in 1867, abolished the lieutenant governorship. However, the position was re-established by a constitutional amendment ratified on November 4, 1970.)	Hall Hammond (D)	James J. Lacy (D)	18D, 11R	87D, 36R	Herbert O'Conor (D)	Millard Tydings (D)	4D, 2R	Dewey/ Warren (R) ✗
1949	William Preston Lane Jr. (D)	(Note: The state's present constitution, adopted in 1867, abolished the lieutenant governorship. However, the position was re-established by a constitutional amendment ratified on November 4, 1970.)	Hall Hammond (D)	James J. Lacy (D)	18D, 11R	87D, 36R	Herbert O'Conor (D)	Millard Tydings (D)	4D, 2R	Dewey/ Warren (R) ✗
1950	William Preston Lane Jr. (D)	(Note: The state's present constitution, adopted in 1867, abolished the lieutenant governorship. However, the position was re-established by a constitutional amendment ratified on November 4, 1970.)	Hall Hammond (D)	James J. Lacy (D)	18D, 11R	87D, 36R	Herbert O'Conor (D)	Millard Tydings (D)	4D, 2R	Dewey/ Warren (R) ✗
1950	William Preston Lane Jr. (D)	(Note: The state's present constitution, adopted in 1867, abolished the lieutenant governorship. However, the position was re-established by a constitutional amendment ratified on November 4, 1970.)	Hall Hammond (D)	J. Millard Tawes (D) (Note: Appointed to fill position initially, then elected.)	18D, 11R	87D, 36R	Herbert O'Conor (D)	Millard Tydings (D)	4D, 2R	Dewey/ Warren (R) ✗
1951	Theodore McKeldin (R)	(Note: The state's present constitution, adopted in 1867, abolished the lieutenant governorship. However, the position was re-established by a constitutional amendment ratified on November 4, 1970.)	Hall Hammond (D)	J. Millard Tawes (D)	18D, 11R	88D, 35R	Herbert O'Conor (D)	John Marshall Butler (R)	3D, 3R	Dewey/ Warren (R) ✗
1952	Theodore McKeldin (R)	(Note: The state's present constitution, adopted in 1867, abolished the lieutenant governorship. However, the position was re-established by a constitutional amendment ratified on November 4, 1970.)	Edward D. E. Rollins (R)	J. Millard Tawes (D)	18D, 11R	88D, 35R	Herbert O'Conor (D)	John Marshall Butler (R)	3D, 3R	Eisenhower/ Nixon (R) ✓
1953	Theodore McKeldin (R)	(Note: The state's present constitution, adopted in 1867, abolished the lieutenant governorship. However, the position was re-established by a constitutional amendment ratified on November 4, 1970.)	Edward D. E. Rollins (R)	J. Millard Tawes (D)	18D, 11R	88D, 35R	J. Glenn Beall (R)	John Marshall Butler (R)	4R, 3D	Eisenhower/ Nixon (R) ✓
1954	Theodore McKeldin (R)	(Note: The state's present constitution, adopted in 1867, abolished the lieutenant governorship. However, the position was re-established by a constitutional amendment ratified on November 4, 1970.)	C. Ferdinand Sybert (D)	J. Millard Tawes (D)	18D, 11R	88D, 35R	J. Glenn Beall (R)	John Marshall Butler (R)	4R, 3D	Eisenhower/ Nixon (R) ✓
1955	Theodore McKeldin (R)	(Note: The state's present constitution, adopted in 1867, abolished the lieutenant governorship. However, the position was re-established by a constitutional amendment ratified on November 4, 1970.)	C. Ferdinand Sybert (D)	J. Millard Tawes (D)	21D, 8R	98D, 25R	J. Glenn Beall (R)	John Marshall Butler (R)	4D, 3R	Eisenhower/ Nixon (R) ✓
1956	Theodore McKeldin (R)	(Note: The state's present constitution, adopted in 1867, abolished the lieutenant governorship. However, the position was re-established by a constitutional amendment ratified on November 4, 1970.)	C. Ferdinand Sybert (D)	J. Millard Tawes (D)	21D, 8R	98D, 25R	J. Glenn Beall (R)	John Marshall Butler (R)	4D, 3R	Eisenhower/ Nixon (R) ✓
1957	Theodore McKeldin (R)	(Note: The state's present constitution, adopted in 1867, abolished the lieutenant governorship. However, the position was re-established by a constitutional amendment ratified on November 4, 1970.)	C. Ferdinand Sybert (D)	J. Millard Tawes (D)	21D, 8R	98D, 25R	J. Glenn Beall (R)	John Marshall Butler (R)	4D, 3R	Eisenhower/ Nixon (R) ✓
1958	Theodore McKeldin (R)	(Note: The state's present constitution, adopted in 1867, abolished the lieutenant governorship. However, the position was re-established by a constitutional amendment ratified on November 4, 1970.)	C. Ferdinand Sybert (D)	J. Millard Tawes (D)	21D, 8R	98D, 25R	J. Glenn Beall (R)	John Marshall Butler (R)	4D, 3R	Eisenhower/ Nixon (R) ✓
1959	J. Millard Tawes (D)	(Note: The state's present constitution, adopted in 1867, abolished the lieutenant governorship. However, the position was re-established by a constitutional amendment ratified on November 4, 1970.)	C. Ferdinand Sybert (D)	Louis L. Goldstein (D)	26D, 3R	116D, 7R	J. Glenn Beall (R)	John Marshall Butler (R)	7D	Eisenhower/ Nixon (R) ✓
1960	J. Millard Tawes (D)	(Note: The state's present constitution, adopted in 1867, abolished the lieutenant governorship. However, the position was re-established by a constitutional amendment ratified on November 4, 1970.)	C. Ferdinand Sybert (D)	Louis L. Goldstein (D)	26D, 3R	116D, 7R	J. Glenn Beall (R)	John Marshall Butler (R)	7D	Kennedy/ Johnson (D) ✓
1961	J. Millard Tawes (D)	(Note: The state's present constitution, adopted in 1867, abolished the lieutenant governorship. However, the position was re-established by a constitutional amendment ratified on November 4, 1970.)	Thomas B. Finan (D)	Louis L. Goldstein (D)	26D, 3R	116D, 7R	J. Glenn Beall (R)	John Marshall Butler (R)	6D, 1R	Kennedy/ Johnson (D) ✓
1962	J. Millard Tawes (D)	(Note: The state's present constitution, adopted in 1867, abolished the lieutenant governorship. However, the position was re-established by a constitutional amendment ratified on November 4, 1970.)	Thomas B. Finan (D)	Louis L. Goldstein (D)	26D, 3R	116D, 7R	J. Glenn Beall (R)	John Marshall Butler (R)	6D, 1R	Kennedy/ Johnson (D) ✓
1963	J. Millard Tawes (D)	(Note: The state's present constitution, adopted in 1867, abolished the lieutenant governorship. However, the position was re-established by a constitutional amendment ratified on November 4, 1970.)	Thomas B. Finan (D)	Louis L. Goldstein (D)	22D, 7R	117D, 25R	J. Glenn Beall (R)	Daniel Brewster (D)	6D, 2R	Kennedy/ Johnson (D) ✓
1964	J. Millard Tawes (D)	(Note: The state's present constitution, adopted in 1867, abolished the lieutenant governorship. However, the position was re-established by a constitutional amendment ratified on November 4, 1970.)	Thomas B. Finan (D)	Louis L. Goldstein (D)	22D, 7R	117D, 25R	J. Glenn Beall (R)	Daniel Brewster (D)	6D, 2R	Johnson/ Humphrey (D) ✓
1965	J. Millard Tawes (D)	(Note: The state's present constitution, adopted in 1867, abolished the lieutenant governorship. However, the position was re-established by a constitutional amendment ratified on November 4, 1970.)	Thomas B. Finan (D)	Louis L. Goldstein (D)	22D, 7R	117D, 25R	Joseph Tydings (D)	Daniel Brewster (D)	5D, 3R	Johnson/ Humphrey (D) ✓
1966	J. Millard Tawes (D)	(Note: The state's present constitution, adopted in 1867, abolished the lieutenant governorship. However, the position was re-established by a constitutional amendment ratified on November 4, 1970.)	Robert C. Murphy (D)	Louis L. Goldstein (D)	22D, 7R	117D, 25R	Joseph Tydings (D)	Daniel Brewster (D)	5D, 3R	Johnson/ Humphrey (D) ✓
1967	Spiro Agnew (R)	(Note: The state's present constitution, adopted in 1867, abolished the lieutenant governorship. However, the position was re-established by a constitutional amendment ratified on November 4, 1970.)	Francis B. Burch (D)	Louis L. Goldstein (D)	35D, 8R	117D, 25R	Joseph Tydings (D)	Daniel Brewster (D)	5D, 3R	Johnson/ Humphrey (D) ✓
1968	Spiro Agnew (R)	(Note: The state's present constitution, adopted in 1867, abolished the lieutenant governorship. However, the position was re-established by a constitutional amendment ratified on November 4, 1970.)	Francis B. Burch (D)	Louis L. Goldstein (D)	35D, 8R	117D, 25R	Joseph Tydings (D)	Daniel Brewster (D)	5D, 3R	Humphrey/ Muskie (D) ✗
1969	Marvin Mandel (D)	(Note: The state's present constitution, adopted in 1867, abolished the lieutenant governorship. However, the position was re-established by a constitutional amendment ratified on November 4, 1970.)	Francis B. Burch (D)	Louis L. Goldstein (D)	35D, 8R	117D, 25R	Joseph Tydings (D)	Charles Mathias (R)	4D, 4R	Humphrey/ Muskie (D) ✗
1970	Marvin Mandel (D)	(Note: The state's present constitution, adopted in 1867, abolished the lieutenant governorship. However, the position was re-established by a constitutional amendment ratified on November 4, 1970.)	Francis B. Burch (D)	Louis L. Goldstein (D)	35D, 8R	117D, 25R	Joseph Tydings (D)	Charles Mathias (R)	4D, 4R	Humphrey/ Muskie (D) ✗
1971	Marvin Mandel (D)	Blair Lee III (D) (Note: Lt. Gov. position created in 1970.)	Francis B. Burch (D)	Louis L. Goldstein (D)	33D, 10R	121D, 21R	J. Glenn Beall Jr. (R)	Charles Mathias (R)	5D, 3R	Humphrey/ Muskie (D) ✗
1972	Marvin Mandel (D)	Blair Lee III (D)	Francis B. Burch (D)	Louis L. Goldstein (D)	33D, 10R	121D, 21R	J. Glenn Beall Jr. (R)	Charles Mathias (R)	5D, 3R	Nixon/ Agnew (R) ✓
1973	Marvin Mandel (D)	Blair Lee III (D)	Francis B. Burch (D)	Louis L. Goldstein (D)	33D, 10R	121D, 21R	J. Glenn Beall Jr. (R)	Charles Mathias (R)	4D, 4R	Nixon/ Agnew (R) ✓
1974	Marvin Mandel (D)	Blair Lee III (D)	Francis B. Burch (D)	Louis L. Goldstein (D)	33D, 10R	121D, 21R	J. Glenn Beall Jr. (R)	Charles Mathias (R)	4D, 4R	Nixon/ Agnew (R) ✓
1975	Marvin Mandel (D)	Blair Lee III (D)	Francis B. Burch (D)	Louis L. Goldstein (D)	39D, 8R	126D, 15R	J. Glenn Beall Jr. (R)	Charles Mathias (R)	5D, 3R	Nixon/ Agnew (R) ✓
1976	Marvin Mandel (D)	Blair Lee III (D)	Francis B. Burch (D)	Louis L. Goldstein (D)	39D, 8R	126D, 15R	J. Glenn Beall Jr. (R)	Charles Mathias (R)	5D, 3R	Carter/ Mondale (D) ✓
1977	Marvin Mandel (D)	Blair Lee III (D)	Francis B. Burch (D)	Louis L. Goldstein (D)	39D, 8R	126D, 15R	Paul Sarbanes (D)	Charles Mathias (R)	5D, 3R	Carter/ Mondale (D) ✓
1978	Marvin Mandel (D)	Blair Lee III (D)	Francis B. Burch (D)	Louis L. Goldstein (D)	39D, 8R	126D, 15R	Paul Sarbanes (D)	Charles Mathias (R)	5D, 3R	Carter/ Mondale (D) ✓
1979	Harry Hughes (D)	Samuel Bogley (D)	Stephen H. Sachs (D) (Note: Jon F. Oster and George A. Nilson each served for one day as Attorney General on January 1 and January 2, 1979, respectively.)	Louis L. Goldstein (D)	40D, 7R	125D, 16R	Paul Sarbanes (D)	Charles Mathias (R)	6D, 2R	Carter/ Mondale (D) ✓
1980	Harry Hughes (D)	Samuel Bogley (D)	Stephen H. Sachs (D)	Louis L. Goldstein (D)	40D, 7R	125D, 16R	Paul Sarbanes (D)	Charles Mathias (R)	6D, 2R	Carter/ Mondale (D) ✗
1981	Harry Hughes (D)	Samuel Bogley (D)	Stephen H. Sachs (D)	Louis L. Goldstein (D)	40D, 7R	125D, 16R	Paul Sarbanes (D)	Charles Mathias (R)	7D, 1R	Carter/ Mondale (D) ✗
1982	Harry Hughes (D)	Samuel Bogley (D)	Stephen H. Sachs (D)	Louis L. Goldstein (D)	40D, 7R	125D, 16R	Paul Sarbanes (D)	Charles Mathias (R)	7D, 1R	Carter/ Mondale (D) ✗
1983	Harry Hughes (D)	J. Joseph Curran Jr. (D)	Stephen H. Sachs (D)	Louis L. Goldstein (D)	41D, 6R	124D, 17R	Paul Sarbanes (D)	Charles Mathias (R)	7D, 1R	Carter/ Mondale (D) ✗
1984	Harry Hughes (D)	J. Joseph Curran Jr. (D)	Stephen H. Sachs (D)	Louis L. Goldstein (D)	41D, 6R	124D, 17R	Paul Sarbanes (D)	Charles Mathias (R)	7D, 1R	Reagan/ Bush (R) ✓
1985	Harry Hughes (D)	J. Joseph Curran Jr. (D)	Stephen H. Sachs (D)	Louis L. Goldstein (D)	41D, 6R	124D, 17R	Paul Sarbanes (D)	Charles Mathias (R)	6D, 2R	Reagan/ Bush (R) ✓
1986	Harry Hughes (D)	J. Joseph Curran Jr. (D)	Stephen H. Sachs (D)	Louis L. Goldstein (D)	41D, 6R	124D, 17R	Paul Sarbanes (D)	Charles Mathias (R)	6D, 2R	Reagan/ Bush (R) ✓
1987	William Donald Schaefer (D)	Melvin Steinberg (D)	J. Joseph Curran Jr. (D)	Louis L. Goldstein (D)	40D, 7R	124D, 17R	Paul Sarbanes (D)	Barbara Mikulski (D)	6D, 2R	Reagan/ Bush (R) ✓
1988	William Donald Schaefer (D)	Melvin Steinberg (D)	J. Joseph Curran Jr. (D)	Louis L. Goldstein (D)	40D, 7R	124D, 17R	Paul Sarbanes (D)	Barbara Mikulski (D)	6D, 2R	Bush/ Quayle (R) ✓
1989	William Donald Schaefer (D)	Melvin Steinberg (D)	J. Joseph Curran Jr. (D)	Louis L. Goldstein (D)	40D, 7R	124D, 17R	Paul Sarbanes (D)	Barbara Mikulski (D)	6D, 2R	Bush/ Quayle (R) ✓
1990	William Donald Schaefer (D)	Melvin Steinberg (D)	J. Joseph Curran Jr. (D)	Louis L. Goldstein (D)	40D, 7R	124D, 17R	Paul Sarbanes (D)	Barbara Mikulski (D)	6D, 2R	Bush/ Quayle (R) ✓
1991	William Donald Schaefer (D)	Melvin Steinberg (D)	J. Joseph Curran Jr. (D)	Louis L. Goldstein (D)	40D, 7R	117D, 24R	Paul Sarbanes (D)	Barbara Mikulski (D)	5D, 3R	Bush/ Quayle (R) ✓
1992	William Donald Schaefer (D)	Melvin Steinberg (D)	J. Joseph Curran Jr. (D)	Louis L. Goldstein (D)	40D, 7R	117D, 24R	Paul Sarbanes (D)	Barbara Mikulski (D)	5D, 3R	Clinton/ Gore (D) ✓
1993	William Donald Schaefer (D)	Melvin Steinberg (D)	J. Joseph Curran Jr. (D)	Louis L. Goldstein (D)	40D, 7R	117D, 24R	Paul Sarbanes (D)	Barbara Mikulski (D)	4D, 4R	Clinton/ Gore (D) ✓
1994	William Donald Schaefer (D)	Melvin Steinberg (D)	J. Joseph Curran Jr. (D)	Louis L. Goldstein (D)	40D, 7R	117D, 24R	Paul Sarbanes (D)	Barbara Mikulski (D)	4D, 4R	Clinton/ Gore (D) ✓
1995	Parris Glendening (D)	Kathleen Kennedy Townsend (D)	J. Joseph Curran Jr. (D)	Louis L. Goldstein (D)	32D, 15R	100D, 41R	Paul Sarbanes (D)	Barbara Mikulski (D)	4D, 4R	Clinton/ Gore (D) ✓
1996	Parris Glendening (D)	Kathleen Kennedy Townsend (D)	J. Joseph Curran Jr. (D)	Louis L. Goldstein (D)	32D, 15R	100D, 41R	Paul Sarbanes (D)	Barbara Mikulski (D)	4D, 4R	Clinton/ Gore (D) ✓
1997	Parris Glendening (D)	Kathleen Kennedy Townsend (D)	J. Joseph Curran Jr. (D)	Louis L. Goldstein (D)	32D, 15R	100D, 41R	Paul Sarbanes (D)	Barbara Mikulski (D)	4D, 4R	Clinton/ Gore (D) ✓
1998	Parris Glendening (D)	Kathleen Kennedy Townsend (D)	J. Joseph Curran Jr. (D)	Robert L. Swann (D)	32D, 15R	100D, 41R	Paul Sarbanes (D)	Barbara Mikulski (D)	4D, 4R	Clinton/ Gore (D) ✓
1999	Parris Glendening (D)	Kathleen Kennedy Townsend (D)	J. Joseph Curran Jr. (D)	William Donald Schaefer (D)	32D, 15R	106D, 35R	Paul Sarbanes (D)	Barbara Mikulski (D)	4D, 4R	Clinton/ Gore (D) ✓
2000	Parris Glendening (D)	Kathleen Kennedy Townsend (D)	J. Joseph Curran Jr. (D)	William Donald Schaefer (D)	33D, 14R (Note: Sen. Robert R. Neall switched parties from Republican to Democratic.)	106D, 35R	Paul Sarbanes (D)	Barbara Mikulski (D)	4D, 4R	Gore/ Lieberman (D) ✗
2001	Parris Glendening (D)	Kathleen Kennedy Townsend (D)	J. Joseph Curran Jr. (D)	William Donald Schaefer (D)	33D, 14R	106D, 35R	Paul Sarbanes (D)	Barbara Mikulski (D)	4D, 4R	Gore/ Lieberman (D) ✗
2002	Parris Glendening (D)	Kathleen Kennedy Townsend (D)	J. Joseph Curran Jr. (D)	William Donald Schaefer (D)	33D, 14R	106D, 35R	Paul Sarbanes (D)	Barbara Mikulski (D)	4D, 4R	Gore/ Lieberman (D) ✗
2003	Bob Ehrlich (R)	Michael Steele (R)	J. Joseph Curran Jr. (D)	William Donald Schaefer (D)	33D, 14R	98D, 43R	Paul Sarbanes (D)	Barbara Mikulski (D)	6D, 2R	Gore/ Lieberman (D) ✗
2004	Bob Ehrlich (R)	Michael Steele (R)	J. Joseph Curran Jr. (D)	William Donald Schaefer (D)	33D, 14R	98D, 43R	Paul Sarbanes (D)	Barbara Mikulski (D)	6D, 2R	Kerry/ Edwards (D) ✗
2005	Bob Ehrlich (R)	Michael Steele (R)	J. Joseph Curran Jr. (D)	William Donald Schaefer (D)	33D, 14R	98D, 43R	Paul Sarbanes (D)	Barbara Mikulski (D)	6D, 2R	Kerry/ Edwards (D) ✗
2006	Bob Ehrlich (R)	Michael Steele (R)	J. Joseph Curran Jr. (D)	William Donald Schaefer (D)	33D, 14R	98D, 43R	Paul Sarbanes (D)	Barbara Mikulski (D)	6D, 2R	Kerry/ Edwards (D) ✗
2007	Martin O'Malley (D)	Anthony Brown (D)	Doug Gansler (D)	Peter Franchot (D)	33D, 14R	104D, 37R	Ben Cardin (D)	Barbara Mikulski (D)	6D, 2R	Kerry/ Edwards (D) ✗
2008	Martin O'Malley (D)	Anthony Brown (D)	Doug Gansler (D)	Peter Franchot (D)	33D, 14R	104D, 37R	Ben Cardin (D)	Barbara Mikulski (D)	6D, 2R	Obama/ Biden (D) ✓
2008	Martin O'Malley (D)	Anthony Brown (D)	Doug Gansler (D)	Peter Franchot (D)	33D, 14R	104D, 36R, 1I (Note: In September 2008, incumbent Republican Rep. Richard B. Weldon Jr. switched his party affiliation to unaffiliated.)	Ben Cardin (D)	Barbara Mikulski (D)	6D, 2R	Obama/ Biden (D) ✓
2009	Martin O'Malley (D)	Anthony Brown (D)	Doug Gansler (D)	Peter Franchot (D)	33D, 14R	104D, 36R, 1I	Ben Cardin (D)	Barbara Mikulski (D)	7D, 1R	Obama/ Biden (D) ✓
2010	Martin O'Malley (D)	Anthony Brown (D)	Doug Gansler (D)	Peter Franchot (D)	33D, 14R	104D, 36R, 1I	Ben Cardin (D)	Barbara Mikulski (D)	7D, 1R	Obama/ Biden (D) ✓
2011	Martin O'Malley (D)	Anthony Brown (D)	Doug Gansler (D)	Peter Franchot (D)	35D, 12R	98D, 43R	Ben Cardin (D)	Barbara Mikulski (D)	6D, 2R	Obama/ Biden (D) ✓
2012	Martin O'Malley (D)	Anthony Brown (D)	Doug Gansler (D)	Peter Franchot (D)	35D, 12R	98D, 43R	Ben Cardin (D)	Barbara Mikulski (D)	6D, 2R	Obama/ Biden (D) ✓
2013	Martin O'Malley (D)	Anthony Brown (D)	Doug Gansler (D)	Peter Franchot (D)	35D, 12R	98D, 43R	Ben Cardin (D)	Barbara Mikulski (D)	7D, 1R	Obama/ Biden (D) ✓
2014	Martin O'Malley (D)	Anthony Brown (D)	Doug Gansler (D)	Peter Franchot (D)	35D, 12R	98D, 43R	Ben Cardin (D)	Barbara Mikulski (D)	7D, 1R	Obama/ Biden (D) ✓
2015	Larry Hogan (R)	Boyd Rutherford (R)	Brian Frosh (D)	Peter Franchot (D)	33D, 14R	91D, 50R	Ben Cardin (D)	Barbara Mikulski (D)	7D, 1R	Obama/ Biden (D) ✓
2016	Larry Hogan (R)	Boyd Rutherford (R)	Brian Frosh (D)	Peter Franchot (D)	33D, 14R	91D, 50R	Ben Cardin (D)	Barbara Mikulski (D)	7D, 1R	Clinton/ Kaine (D) ✗
2017	Larry Hogan (R)	Boyd Rutherford (R)	Brian Frosh (D)	Peter Franchot (D)	33D, 14R	91D, 50R	Ben Cardin (D)	Chris Van Hollen (D)	7D, 1R	Clinton/ Kaine (D) ✗
2018	Larry Hogan (R)	Boyd Rutherford (R)	Brian Frosh (D)	Peter Franchot (D)	33D, 14R	91D, 50R	Ben Cardin (D)	Chris Van Hollen (D)	7D, 1R	Clinton/ Kaine (D) ✗
2018	Larry Hogan (R)	Boyd Rutherford (R)	Brian Frosh (D)	Peter Franchot (D)	33D, 14R	91D, 49R, 1G (Note: In October 2018, Republican Rep. Meagan Simonaire switched her party affiliation to Democratic, and In November 2018, Democratic Rep. Shane Robinson switched his party affiliation to Green.)	Ben Cardin (D)	Chris Van Hollen (D)	7D, 1R	Clinton/ Kaine (D) ✗
2019	Larry Hogan (R)	Boyd Rutherford (R)	Brian Frosh (D)	Peter Franchot (D)	32D, 15R	99D, 42R	Ben Cardin (D)	Chris Van Hollen (D)	7D, 1R	Clinton/ Kaine (D) ✗
2020	Larry Hogan (R)	Boyd Rutherford (R)	Brian Frosh (D)	Peter Franchot (D)	32D, 15R	99D, 42R	Ben Cardin (D)	Chris Van Hollen (D)	7D, 1R	Biden/ Harris (D) ✓
2021	Larry Hogan (R)	Boyd Rutherford (R)	Brian Frosh (D)	Peter Franchot (D)	32D, 15R	99D, 42R	Ben Cardin (D)	Chris Van Hollen (D)	7D, 1R	Biden/ Harris (D) ✓
2022	Larry Hogan (R)	Boyd Rutherford (R)	Brian Frosh (D)	Peter Franchot (D)	32D, 15R	99D, 42R	Ben Cardin (D)	Chris Van Hollen (D)	7D, 1R	Biden/ Harris (D) ✓
2023	Wes Moore (D)	Aruna Miller (D)	Anthony Brown (D)	Brooke Lierman (D)	34D, 13R	102D, 39R	Ben Cardin (D)	Chris Van Hollen (D)	7D, 1R	Biden/ Harris (D) ✓
2024	Wes Moore (D)	Aruna Miller (D)	Anthony Brown (D)	Brooke Lierman (D)	34D, 13R	102D, 39R	Ben Cardin (D)	Chris Van Hollen (D)	7D, 1R	Harris/ Walz (D) ✗
2025	Wes Moore (D)	Aruna Miller (D)	Anthony Brown (D)	Brooke Lierman (D)	34D, 13R	102D, 39R	Angela Alsobrooks (D)	Chris Van Hollen (D)	7D, 1R	Harris/ Walz (D) ✗
2026	Wes Moore (D)	Aruna Miller (D)	Anthony Brown (D)	Brooke Lierman (D)	34D, 13R	102D, 39R	Angela Alsobrooks (D)	Chris Van Hollen (D)	7D, 1R	Harris/ Walz (D) ✗
2027	Wes Moore (D)	Aruna Miller (D)	Anthony Brown (D)	Brooke Lierman (D)	35D, 12R	106D, 35R	Angela Alsobrooks (D)	Chris Van Hollen (D)	7D, 1R	Harris/ Walz (D) ✗

Key to party colors and abbreviations for members of the U.S. Congress and other politicians or officials
Alaskan Independence (AKIP) Know Nothing (KN) American Labor (AL) Anti-Jacksonian (Anti-J); National Republican (NR) Anti-Administration (AA) Anti-Masonic (Anti-M) Conservative (Con) Covenant (Cov)	Democratic (D) Democratic–Farmer–Labor (DFL) Democratic–NPL (D-NPL) Dixiecrat (Dix), States' Rights (SR) Democratic-Republican (DR) Farmer–Labor (FL) Federalist (F); Pro-Administration (PA)	Free Soil (FS) Fusion (Fus) Greenback (GB) Independence (IPM) Jacksonian (J) Liberal (Lib) Libertarian (L) National Union (NU)	Nonpartisan League (NPL) Nullifier (N) Opposition Northern (O); Opposition Southern (O) Populist (Pop) Progressive (Prog) Prohibition (Proh) Readjuster (Rea)	Republican (R) Silver (Sv) Silver Republican (SvR) Socialist (Soc) Union (U) Unconditional Union (UU) Vermont Progressive (VP) Whig (W)	Independent (I) Nonpartisan (NP)

== See also ==
- Politics in Maryland
- Government of Maryland
