= 1899 Maryland Attorney General election =

- November 7, 1899
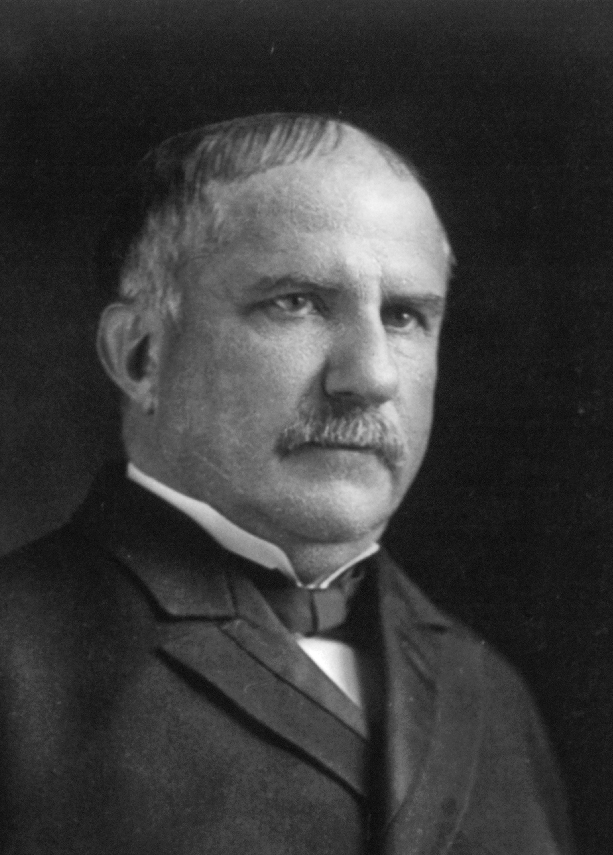

Nominee	Isidor Rayner	John Van Lear Findlay
Party	Democratic	Republican
Popular vote	126,593	116,273
Percentage	50.75%	46.61%
- County results Rayner: 40–50% 50–60% Findlay: 40–50% 50–60% 60–70%
Attorney General before election
George Riggs Gaither Jr.
Republican
Elected Attorney General
Isidor Rayner
Democratic

The 1899 Maryland attorney general election was held on November 7, 1899, in order to elect the attorney general of Maryland. Democratic nominee and former member of the U.S. House of Representatives from Maryland's 4th district Isidor Rayner defeated Republican nominee and former member of the U.S. House of Representatives from Maryland's 4th district John Van Lear Findlay, Prohibition nominee Finley C. Hendrickson, Social Democratic nominee Charles B. Backman and Union Reform nominee Robert B. Walling.

== General election ==
On election day, November 7, 1899, Democratic nominee Isidor Rayner won the election by a margin of 10,320 votes against his foremost opponent Republican nominee John Van Lear Findlay, thereby gaining Democratic control over the office of attorney general. Rayner was sworn in as the 23rd attorney general of Maryland on January 3, 1900.

=== Results ===
Maryland Attorney General election, 1899
Party	Candidate	Votes	%
Democratic	Isidor Rayner	126,593	50.75
Republican	John Van Lear Findlay	116,273	46.61
Prohibition	Finley C. Hendrickson	5,649	2.26
Social Democratic	Charles B. Backman	496	0.20
Union Reform Party	Robert B. Walling	454	0.18
Total votes		249,465	100.00
Democratic gain from Republican			
