= 1903 Maryland Attorney General election =

- November 3, 1903
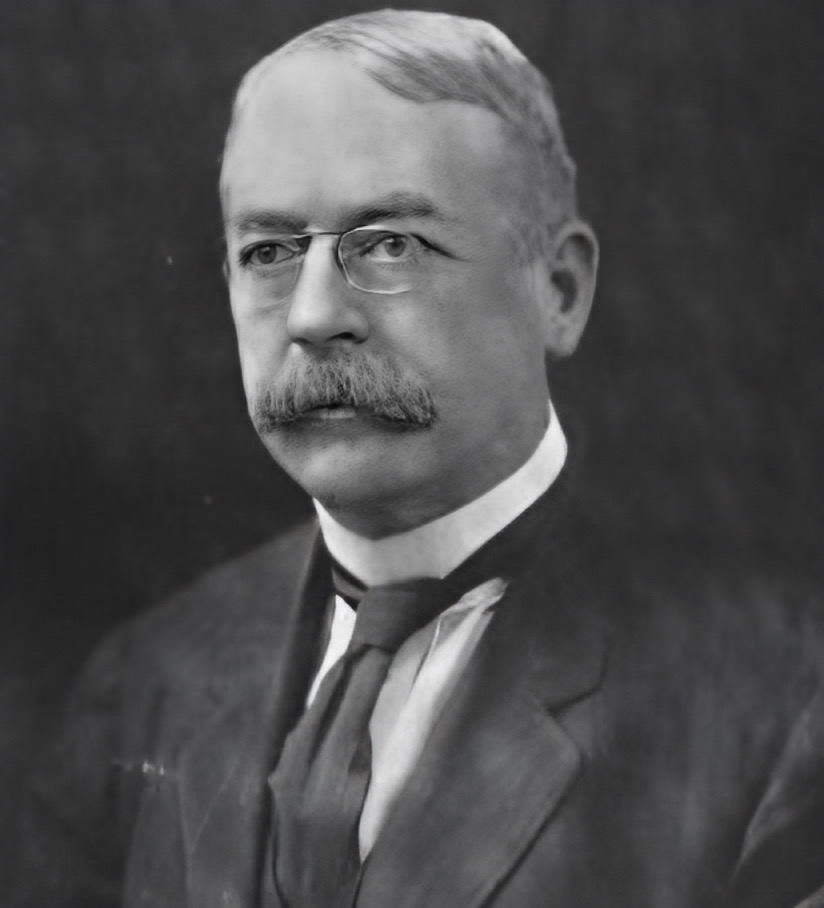

Nominee	William Shepard Bryan Jr.	George Whitelock
Party	Democratic	Republican
Popular vote	105,110	92,587
Percentage	51.81%	45.63%
- County results Bryan: 50–60% 60–70% Whitelock: 40–50% 50–60% 60–70%
Attorney General before election
Isidor Rayner
Democratic
Elected Attorney General
William Shepard Bryan Jr.
Democratic

The 1903 Maryland attorney general election was held on November 3, 1903, in order to elect the attorney general of Maryland. Democratic nominee William Shepard Bryan Jr. defeated Republican nominee George Whitelock, Socialist nominee Charles B. Backman and Prohibition nominee Frank Higgins.

== General election ==
On election day, November 3, 1903, Democratic nominee William Shepard Bryan Jr. won the election by a margin of 12,523 votes against his foremost opponent Republican nominee George Whitelock, thereby retaining Democratic control over the office of attorney general. Bryan was sworn in as the 24th attorney general of Maryland on January 3, 1904.

=== Results ===
Maryland Attorney General election, 1903
Party	Candidate	Votes	%
Democratic	William Shepard Bryan Jr.	105,110	51.81
Republican	George Whitelock	92,587	45.63
Socialist	Charles B. Backman	3,640	1.79
Prohibition	Frank Higgins	1,560	0.77
Total votes		202,897	100.00
Democratic hold			
