= 1911 Maryland Comptroller election =

- November 7, 1911
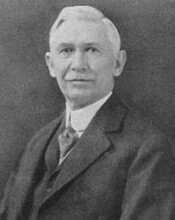
Nominee	Emerson Harrington
Party	Democratic
Popular vote	Unknown
Percentage	100.00%
- County results Harrington: 90–100%
Comptroller before election
Charles H. Stanley (Acting)
Democratic
Elected Comptroller
Emerson Harrington
Democratic

The 1911 Maryland comptroller election was held on November 7, 1911, in order to elect the comptroller of Maryland. Democratic nominee Emerson Harrington won the election as he ran unopposed. The exact results of the election are unknown.

== General election ==
On election day, November 7, 1911, Democratic nominee Emerson Harrington won the election as he ran unopposed, thereby retaining Democratic control over the office of comptroller. Harrington was sworn in as the 23rd comptroller of Maryland on January 15, 1912.

=== Results ===
Maryland Comptroller election, 1911
Party	Candidate	Votes	%
Democratic	Emerson Harrington	Unknown	100.00
Total votes		Unknown	100.00
Democratic hold			
