= John A. Cunningham =

John A. Cunningham may refer to:

- John Anderson Cunningham (born 1939), British Labour Party politician
- John A. Cunningham, Republican candidate for Comptroller of Maryland in 1911, defeated by Emerson Harrington
