= Edward Bingham (disambiguation) =

Edward Bingham (1881–1939) was a British Rear Admiral and Victoria Cross recipient.

Edward Bingham may also refer to:

- Edward Franklin Bingham (1828–1907), Chief Justice of the Supreme Court of the District of Columbia
- Edward W. Bingham (1901–1993), British polar explorer
