= 1913 Maryland Comptroller election =

- November 4, 1913
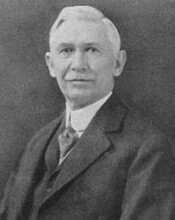

Nominee	Emerson Harrington	Oliver Metzerott
Party	Democratic	Republican
Popular vote	105,976	68,824
Percentage	56.10%	36.43%
- County results Harrington: 40–50% 50–60% 60–70% 70–80% Metzerott: 40–50% 50–60%
Comptroller before election
Emerson Harrington
Democratic
Elected Comptroller
Emerson Harrington
Democratic

The 1913 Maryland comptroller election was held on November 4, 1913, in order to elect the comptroller of Maryland. Democratic nominee and incumbent comptroller Emerson Harrington defeated Republican nominee Oliver Metzerott, Progressive nominee Joseph B. Baldwin, Socialist nominee Charles B. Backman and Prohibition nominee Richard Henry Holme.

== General election ==
On election day, November 4, 1913, Democratic nominee Emerson Harrington won re-election by a margin of 37,152 votes against his foremost opponent Republican nominee Oliver Metzerott, thereby retaining Democratic control over the office of comptroller. Harrington was sworn in for his second term on January 19, 1914.

=== Results ===
Maryland Comptroller election, 1913
Party	Candidate	Votes	%
Democratic	Emerson Harrington (incumbent)	105,976	56.10
Republican	Oliver Metzerott	68,824	36.43
Progressive	Joseph B. Baldwin	7,496	3.97
Socialist	Charles B. Backman	3,589	1.90
Prohibition	Richard Henry Holme	3,022	1.60
Total votes		188,907	100.00
Democratic hold			
