= William Shepard Bryan =

American judge (1827–1906)

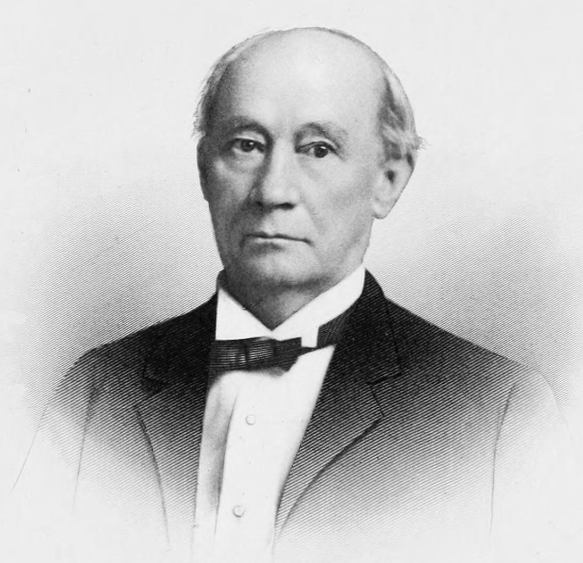

Justice of the Maryland Court of Appeals
- In office 1883–1898

Personal details
- Born: November 20, 1827 New Bern, North Carolina
- Died: December 9, 1906 (aged 79) Baltimore, Maryland
- Resting place: Green Mount Cemetery
- Party: Democratic
- Spouse: Elizabeth Edmondson Hayward (m. 1857; died 1898)
- Children: 4, including William Shepard Jr.
- Parent: John Heritage Bryan (father)
- Education: University of North Carolina
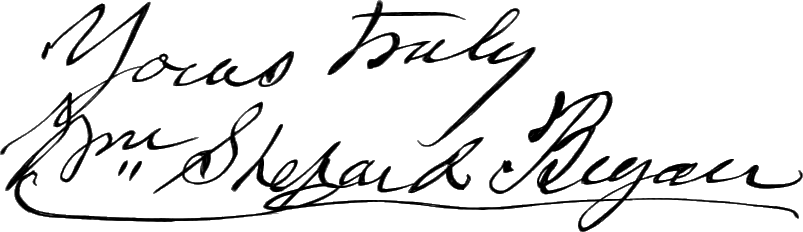
- Signature

William Shepard Bryan (November 20, 1827 – December 9, 1906) was a Maryland lawyer who served as a justice of the Maryland Court of Appeals from 1883 to 1898.

== Early life, education, and career ==
Born in New Bern, North Carolina, he was the son of Congressman John Heritage Bryan. Bryan "received his early general and education in the South". He graduated from the University of North Carolina and read law under the supervision of his father. He moved to Baltimore in 1850, and read law to gain admission to the bar in Maryland in 1851, thereafter entering the practice of law. He was a southern sympathizer during the American Civil War, and was a presidential elector in the 1876 United States presidential election.

== Judicial service ==
In 1883, Bryan was elected as a Democrat to the Baltimore seat on the Court of Appeals vacated by the resignation of Judge James Lawrence Bartol. As the only judge with no circuit duties to perform, he "delivered the opinion of the court in a large number of cases, many of them being of great importance and public interest". He retired from the court in 1898.

== Personal life and death ==
On October 1, 1857, Bryan married Elizabeth "Lizzie" Edmondson Hayward of Talbot County, Maryland, with whom he had a daughter and three sons. Bryan's wife died in 1898. Bryan himself died of liver cancer eight years later, at the age of 79, at the home of his son, William Shepard Jr., who was then attorney general of the state. He was interred in Baltimore's Green Mount Cemetery.

Political offices
Preceded by James Lawrence Bartol	Judge of the Maryland Court of Appeals; 1883–1898	Succeeded by Samuel D. Schmucker
