= 1907 Maryland gubernatorial election =

- November 5, 1907
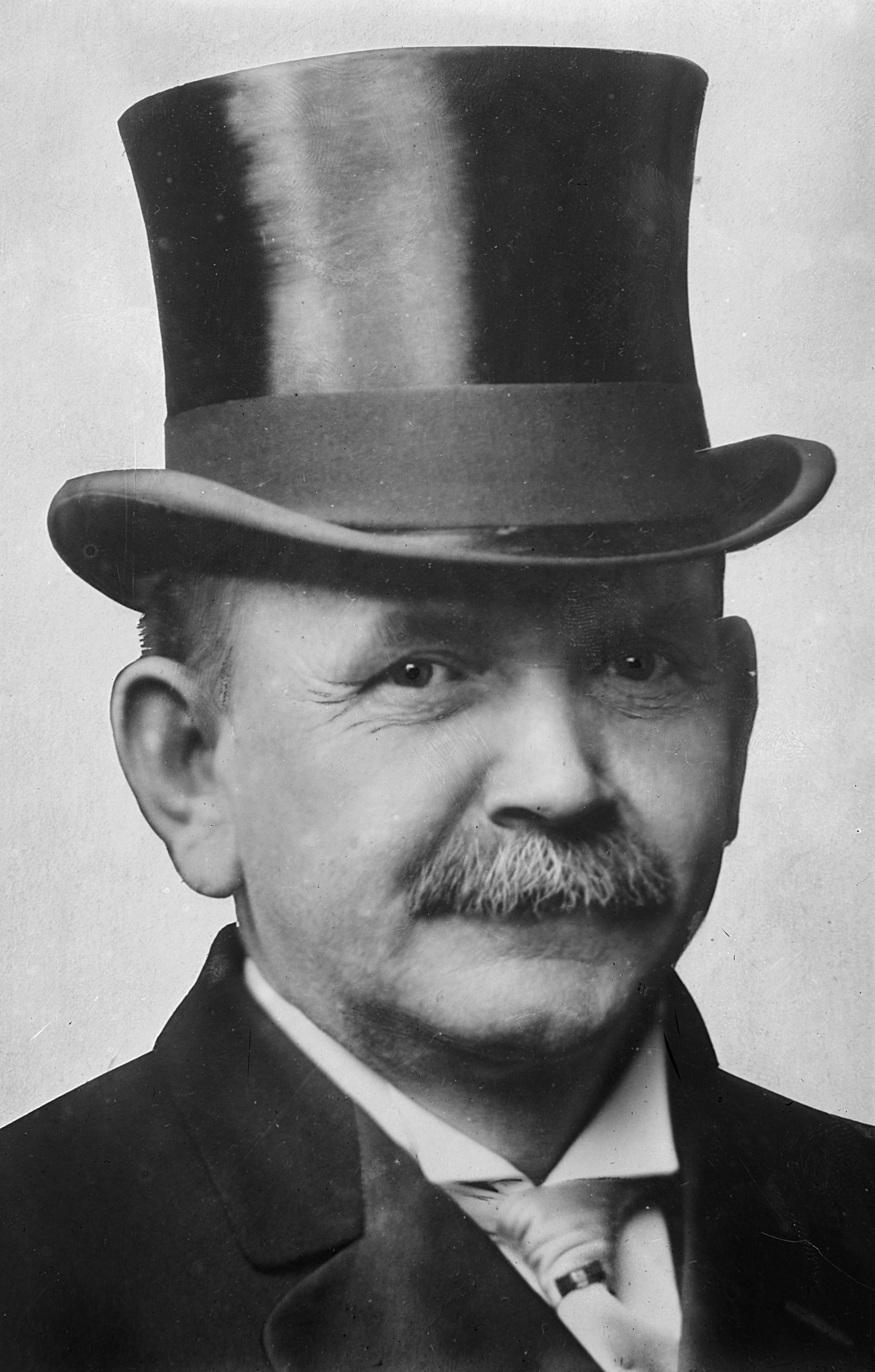

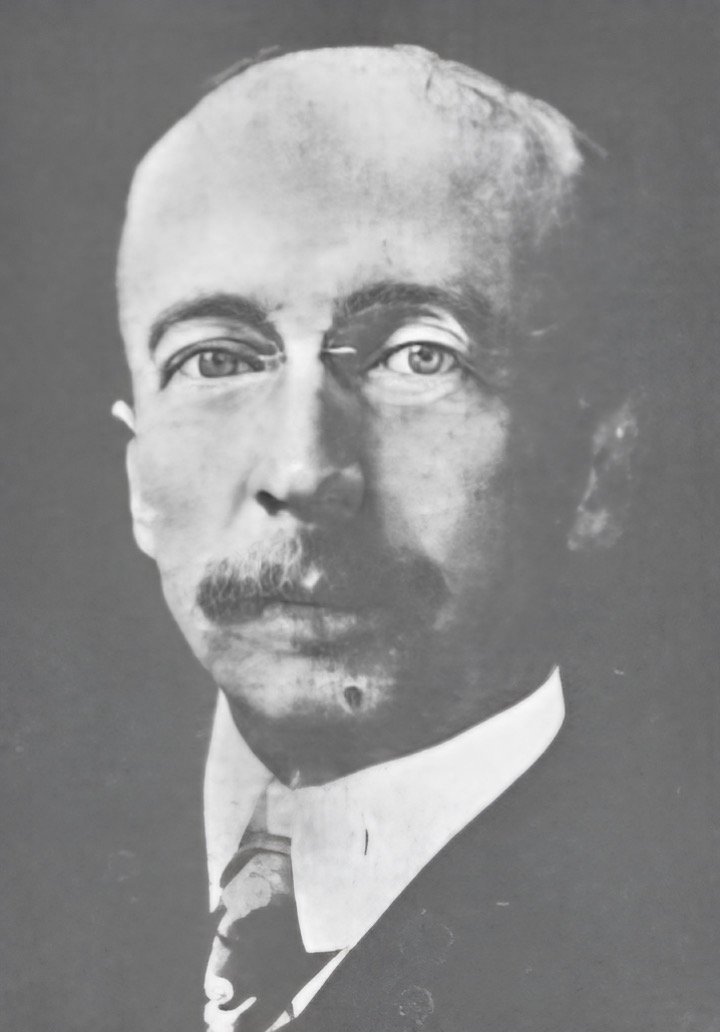
Nominee	Austin Lane Crothers	George Riggs Gaither Jr.
Party	Democratic	Republican
Popular vote	102,051	94,300
Percentage	50.66%	46.81%
- County results Crothers: 40–50% 50–60% 60–70% Gaither: 40–50% 50–60% 60–70%
Governor before election
Edwin Warfield
Democratic
Elected Governor
Austin Lane Crothers
Democratic

The 1907 Maryland gubernatorial election took place on November 5, 1907.

Incumbent Governor Edwin Warfield did not seek re-election.

Democratic candidate Austin Lane Crothers defeated Republican candidate George R. Gaither Jr.

== General election ==
=== Candidates ===
- Austin Lane Crothers, Democratic, associate judge for the Second Judicial Circuit
- George Riggs Gaither Jr., Republican, former Attorney General of Maryland
- Ira Culp, Socialist, school principal
- James W. Frizzell, Prohibition

=== Results ===
1907 Maryland gubernatorial election
Party	Candidate	Votes	%	±%
Democratic	Austin Lane Crothers	102,051	50.66%	
Republican	George R. Gaither Jr.	94,300	46.81%	
Prohibition	James W. Frizzell	3,776	1.87%	
Socialist	Ira Culp	1,310	0.65%	
Majority		7,751	3.85%	
Turnout		201,437	100.00%	
Democratic hold		Swing		
