= 1915 Maryland gubernatorial election =

- November, 1915
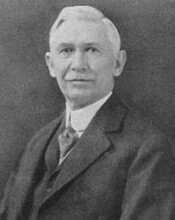

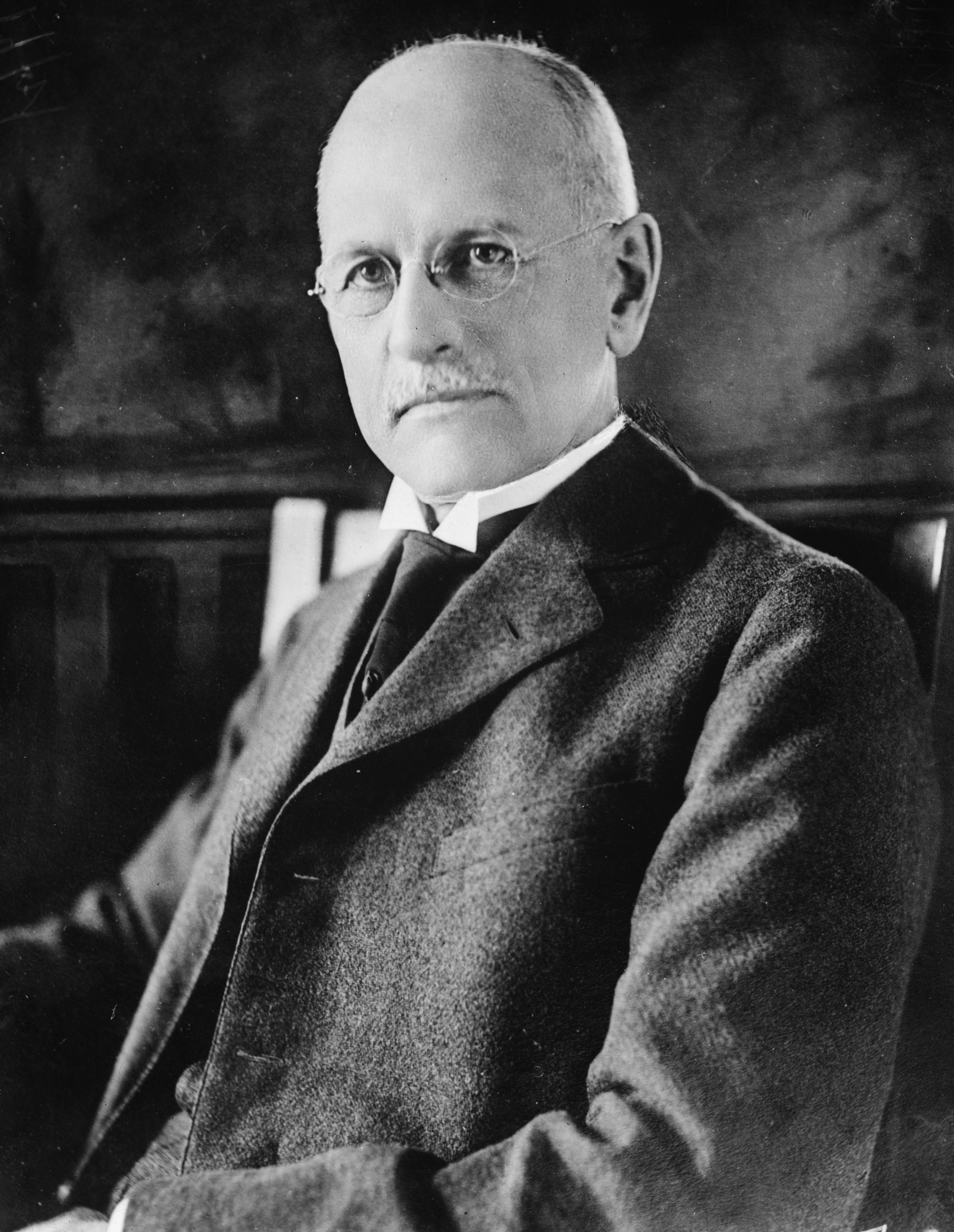
Nominee	Emerson Harrington	Ovington Weller
Party	Democratic	Republican
Popular vote	119,317	116,136
Percentage	49.16%	48.67%
- County results Harrington: 40–50% 50–60% Weller: 40–50% 50–60% 60–70%
Governor before election
Phillips L. Goldsborough
Republican
Elected Governor
Emerson Harrington
Democratic

The 1915 Maryland gubernatorial election occurred on the month of November, 1915. The race pitted Democratic Comptroller Emerson Harrington against future Republican United States Senator Ovington Weller. Harrington won the governor's office in a very narrow race.

== Election results ==
Maryland gubernatorial election, 1915
Party	Candidate	Votes	%	±%
Democratic	Emerson C. Harrington	119,317	49.16%	
Republican	Ovington Weller	116,136	48.67%	
Prohibition	George Gorsuch	2,335	0.96%	
Socialist	Charles Devlin	2,082	0.86%	
Labor	Robert Stevens	853	0.35%	
Majority		1,181	0.49%	
Democratic gain from Republican		Swing		
