= Henry Stockbridge Jr. =

American judge

Member of the U.S. House of Representatives from Maryland's 4th district
- In office March 4, 1889 – March 3, 1891
- Preceded by: Isidor Rayner
- Succeeded by: Isidor Rayner

Personal details
- Born: September 18, 1856 Baltimore, Maryland, U.S.
- Died: March 22, 1924 (aged 67) Baltimore, Maryland, U.S.
- Resting place: Loudon Park National Cemetery, Baltimore, Maryland, U.S.
- Party: Republican
- Education: Williston Academy; Amherst College; University of Maryland, Baltimore
- Profession: Politician, lawyer, judge

Henry Stockbridge Jr. (September 18, 1856 – March 22, 1924) was a U.S. Representative from Maryland.

Born in Baltimore, Maryland, Stockbridge attended public and private schools and Williston Academy of Easthampton, Massachusetts. He graduated from Amherst College in 1877, where he was a member of Chi Phi fraternity. He attended law school at the University of Maryland at Baltimore and graduated in 1878. He was admitted to the bar in the latter year and commenced practice in Baltimore. He was also employed on the editorial staff of the Baltimore Herald and later with the Baltimore American. He was appointed as an examiner in equity by the supreme bench of Baltimore in December 1882.

Stockbridge was elected as a Republican to the Fifty-first Congress (March 4, 1889 – March 3, 1891), but declined to be a candidate for renomination in 1890. Afterwards, he served as United States commissioner of immigration for the port of Baltimore from 1891 to 1893.

He was a member of the General Society of Colonial Wars and served as the 14th President General of the National Society of Sons of the American Revolution.

Stockbridge was elected judge of the supreme bench of Baltimore in November 1896 and served until 1911, and was a Regent of the University of Maryland from 1907 to 1920. He was appointed judge of the Maryland Court of Appeals on April 13, 1911, and was elected in November 1911 for a term of fifteen years. He died in Baltimore, and is interred in Loudon Park National Cemetery.

U.S. House of Representatives
Preceded by Isidor Rayner	Member of the U.S. House of Representatives from Maryland's 4th congressional district 1889–1891	Succeeded by Isidor Rayner
