= Edward Franklin Bingham =

American politician and judge (1828–1907)

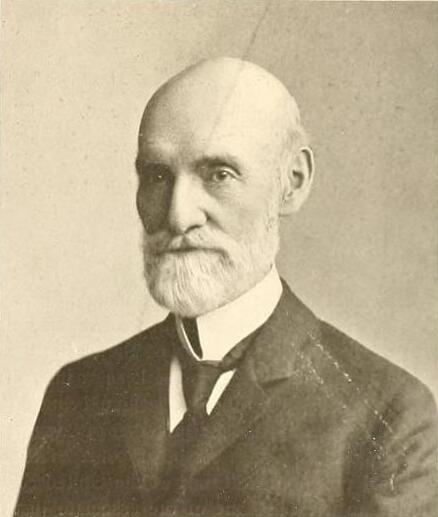
- Bingham in a 1903 publication

Chief Justice of the Supreme Court of the District of Columbia
- In office April 22, 1887 – April 30, 1903
- Appointed by: Grover Cleveland
- Preceded by: David Kellogg Cartter
- Succeeded by: Harry M. Clabaugh

Member of the Ohio House of Representatives
- In office 1856-1857

Personal details
- Born: Edward Franklin Bingham; August 13, 1828 Concord, Vermont, U.S.
- Died: September 5, 1907 (aged 79) Union, West Virginia, U.S.
- Resting place: Green Lawn Cemetery; Columbus, Ohio, U.S.
- Party: Democratic
- Spouse(s): Susannah F. Gunning (m. 1850; died 1886) Lin Caperton Patton (m. 1888)
- Children: 4
- Education: Marietta College

Edward Franklin Bingham (August 13, 1828 – September 5, 1907) was an American politician, lawyer and judge. He served as chief justice of the Supreme Court of the District of Columbia.

== Early life ==
Edward Franklin Bingham was born on August 13, 1828, in West Concord (now Concord), Vermont, to Lucy (née Wheeler) and Warner Bingham. His father was a judge. Bingham attended public schools in Vermont and an academy in Peacham, Vermont. He attended Marietta College, but didn't graduate, and read law with his brother Harry Bingham in Littleton, New Hampshire, in 1850. He studied law under Joseph Miller of Chillicothe, Ohio. He was admitted to the bar in Ohio in May 1850.

== Law career ==
Bingham was in private practice in McArthur, Ohio, from June 1, 1850, to 1861, and in Columbus, Ohio, from 1861 to 1867, also working as prosecuting attorney of Vinton County, Ohio, from November 1850 to 1855 and serving in the Ohio House of Representatives from 1856 to 1857. He was city solicitor for Columbus, thereafter returning to private practice in Columbus until 1873. In 1858, he was the Democratic nominee for the Court of Common Pleas, but lost to W. W. Johnson. In 1868, he was chairman of Ohio's Democratic executive committee. From 1867 to 1871, he was election solicitor of Columbus. From 1863 to 1868, he was a member of the board of education in Columbus and was re-elected to the board again in 1872. He was a judge of the Court of Common Pleas for the Fifth Judicial District in Columbus from 1873 to 1888. He was a delegate from Ohio to the 1860 and 1876 Democratic National Conventions.

Bingham was an unsuccessful Democratic nominee for judge of the Supreme Court of Ohio in 1881. He received a recess appointment from President Grover Cleveland on April 22, 1887, to the chief justice seat on the Supreme Court of the District of Columbia (now the United States District Court for the District of Columbia) vacated by Chief Justice David Kellogg Cartter. He was nominated to the same position by President Cleveland on December 20, 1887. He was confirmed by the United States Senate on January 23, 1888, and received his commission the same day. His service terminated on April 30, 1903, due to his retirement due to age limit.

Following his retirement from the federal bench, Bingham resumed private practice in Columbus from 1903 to 1907.

== Personal life ==
Bingham married Susannah F. Gunning of Fayette County, Ohio, on November 21, 1850. They had two sons and two daughters, including Harry, E. T. and Mrs. William H. Mitchel. His wife died in 1886. He married Lin Caperton Patton, daughter of Allen T. Caperton on August 8, 1888. As of 1903, he lived on H Street NW in Washington, D.C. After retiring, he lived at the Grafton Hotel on Connecticut Avenue in Washington, D.C. He had a country home in Union, West Virginia.

Bingham died on September 5, 1907, at his summer home in Union, West Virginia. He was buried in Green Lawn Cemetery in Columbus.

== Sources ==
Ohio House of Representatives
Preceded by William J. Evans	Representative from Jackson County; 1856–1858	Succeeded by R. B. Stevenson
Legal offices
Preceded by David Kellogg Cartter	Chief Justice of the Supreme Court of the District of Columbia; 1887–1903	Succeeded by Harry M. Clabaugh
