= Harry M. Clabaugh =

American judge

Harry Morris Clabaugh
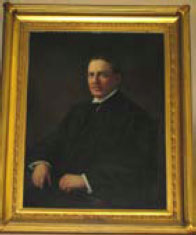

Chief Justice of the Supreme Court of the District of Columbia
- In office April 1, 1903 – March 6, 1914
- Appointed by: Theodore Roosevelt
- Preceded by: Edward Franklin Bingham
- Succeeded by: J. Harry Covington

Associate Justice of the Supreme Court of the District of Columbia
- In office March 2, 1899 – May 1, 1903
- Appointed by: William McKinley
- Preceded by: Louis E. McComas
- Succeeded by: Jeter Connelly Pritchard

21st Attorney General of Maryland
- In office 1895–1899
- Governor: Frank Brown; Lloyd Lowndes Jr.
- Preceded by: John P. Poe Sr.
- Succeeded by: George Riggs Gaither Jr.

Personal details
- Born: Harry M. Clabaugh; July 16, 1856 Cumberland, Maryland, U.S.
- Died: March 6, 1914 (aged 57) Washington, D.C., U.S.
- Party: Republican
- Education: University of Maryland School of Law (LL.B.)

Harry M. Clabaugh (July 16, 1856 – March 6, 1914) was an Associate Justice and Chief Justice of the Supreme Court of the District of Columbia.

== Education and career ==
Born in Cumberland, Maryland, Clabaugh received a Bachelor of Laws from the University of Maryland School of Law in 1878. He was in private practice in Baltimore, Maryland, from 1878 to 1880, and in Carroll County, Maryland, from 1880 to 1904. He was Chairman of the Republican State Central Committee from 1891 to 1899. He was Attorney General of Maryland from 1895 to 1904.

== Federal judicial service ==
Clabaugh was nominated by President William McKinley on February 21, 1899, to an Associate Justice seat on the Supreme Court of the District of Columbia (now the United States District Court for the District of Columbia) vacated by Associate Justice Louis E. McComas. He was confirmed by the United States Senate on March 2, 1899, and received his commission the same day. His service terminated on May 1, 1903, due to his elevation to be Chief Justice of the same court.

Clabaugh received a recess appointment from President Theodore Roosevelt on April 1, 1903, to the Chief Justice seat on the Supreme Court of the District of Columbia (now the United States District Court for the District of Columbia) vacated by Chief Justice Edward Franklin Bingham. He was nominated to the same position by President Roosevelt on November 10, 1903. He was confirmed by the Senate on November 16, 1903, and received his commission the same day. His service terminated on March 6, 1914, due to his death in Washington, D.C.

== Sources ==
Legal offices
Preceded by John P. Poe Sr.	Attorney General of Maryland; 1895–1899	Succeeded by George Riggs Gaither Jr.
Preceded by Louis E. McComas	Associate Justice of the Supreme Court of the District of Columbia; 1899–1903	Succeeded by Jeter Connelly Pritchard
Preceded by Edward Franklin Bingham	Chief Justice of the Supreme Court of the District of Columbia; 1903–1914	Succeeded by J. Harry Covington
