= John Van Lear Findlay =

American politician

Member of the U.S. House of Representatives from Maryland's 4th district
- In office March 4, 1883 – March 3, 1887
- Preceded by: Robert Milligan McLane
- Succeeded by: Isidor Rayner

Personal details
- Born: December 23, 1839 Williamsport, Maryland, U.S.
- Died: April 19, 1907 (aged 67) Baltimore, Maryland, U.S.
- Resting place: Green Mount Cemetery
- Party: Democratic
- Education: Princeton University

John Van Lear Findlay (December 21, 1839 – April 19, 1907) was a U.S. representative from Maryland.

== Biography ==
Born at Mount Tammany, near Williamsport, Maryland, Findlay was privately tutored, pursued classical studies, and graduated from Princeton College in 1858. He served as member of the Maryland House of Delegates in 1861 and 1862. He studied law, was admitted to the bar, and commenced practice in Baltimore, Maryland, in 1869. He served as collector of internal revenue for the third district of Maryland at Baltimore in 1865 and 1866, and was appointed city solicitor for Baltimore in 1876 and served two years. He was orator for Maryland on "Maryland Day" at the United States Centennial Exhibition of 1876.

Findlay was elected as a Democrat to the Forty-eighth and Forty-ninth Congresses (March 4, 1883 – March 3, 1887). He resumed the practice of law, and was appointed a member of the Venezuelan Claims Commission in 1889, and nominated as arbitrator on the Chilean Claims Commission in 1893, but the Senate rejected the nomination. He died in Baltimore, Maryland, April 19, 1907, and was interred in Green Mount Cemetery.

== Family ==
Findlay was a nephew of U.S. Senator William Findlay's son John King Findlay.

U.S. House of Representatives
Preceded by Robert Milligan McLane	Member of the U.S. House of Representatives from Maryland's 4th congressional district 1883–1887	Succeeded by Isidor Rayner
