= Hugh A. McMullen =

American businessman, politician (1859–1937)

Hugh Aloysius McMullen (1859 – 1937) was an American businessman and politician who served as the Comptroller of Maryland from 1916 to 1920. A Democrat from Allegany County, he was previously active in mining, mercantile trade, and banking.

McMullen was born in Franklin, Maryland on December 9, 1859. He worked in Colorado as a contractor and prospector in the early 1880s before returning to Maryland to operate McMullen Brothers & Company, a mercantile firm. He later helped found the Citizens National Bank of Cumberland and was involved in coal mining enterprises in West Virginia and Kentucky.

McMullen was elected Comptroller in 1915 and re-elected in 1917. During his tenure, he oversaw the state’s fiscal administration and served on the Maryland State Council of Defense during World War I. His term ended in 1920.

He married Anna M. Mulledy in 1889 and had eight children. McMullen died in Cumberland, Maryland, November 6, 1937.

A segment of U.S. Route 220 in Allegany County is named McMullen Highway in his honor.
