= George Riggs Gaither Jr. =

American lawyer and politician (1858–1921)

George R. Gaither
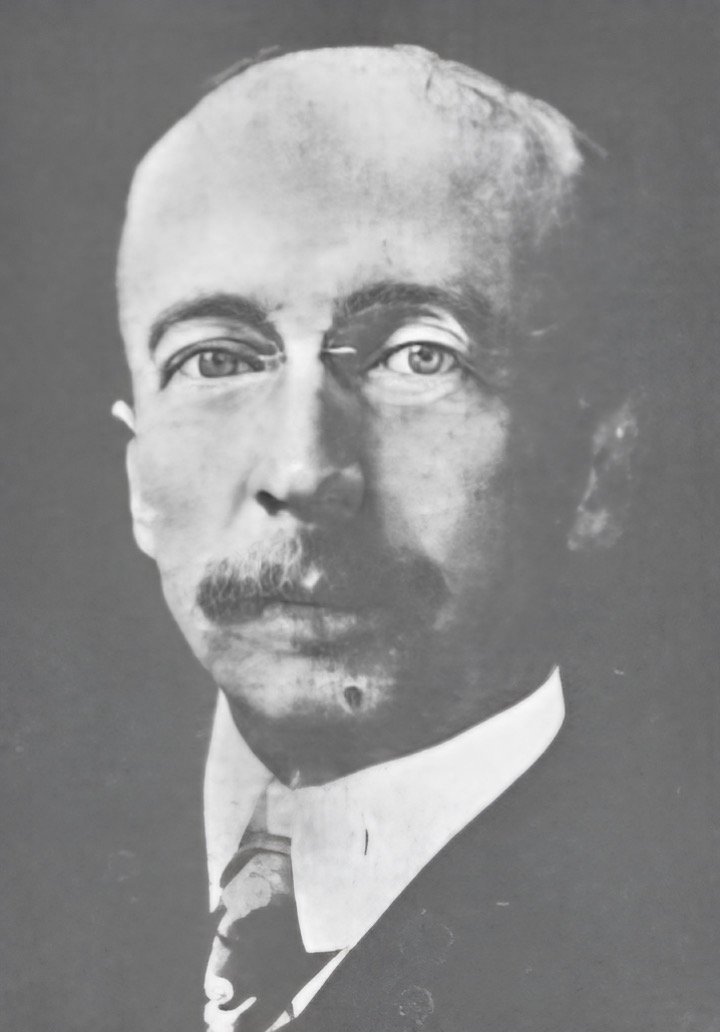

Attorney General of Maryland
- In office March 25, 1899 – November 2, 1899
- Governor: Lloyd Lowndes Jr.
- Preceded by: Harry M. Clabaugh
- Succeeded by: Isidor Rayner

Personal details
- Born: February 28, 1858 Howard County, Maryland, U.S.
- Died: October 17, 1921 (aged 63) Catonsville, Maryland, U.S.
- Resting place: Green Mount Cemetery
- Party: Republican
- Other political affiliations: Democrat (before 1892); Republican (after 1892)
- Spouse: Fannie Imogen Granger
- Children: 3
- Education: Princeton College

George R. Gaither (February 28, 1858 – October 17, 1921) was a lawyer and politician in Maryland. His career spanned several roles, including serving as the Attorney General of Maryland and engaging in politics in Baltimore.

== Early life and education ==
George R. Gaither was born on February 28, 1858, in Howard County, Maryland, to Rebecca Harrison (née Dorsey) and Col. George Riggs Gaither Jr. He was educated in Howard County schools before attending Princeton College, where he graduated in 1878. Gaither then pursued legal studies in Baltimore, completing his law degree in 1880.

== Career ==
Gaither's professional life was primarily in law and public service. After becoming a lawyer, he practiced in Baltimore and was a partner with William Shepard Bryan Jr. In the political realm, he switched from the Democratic to the Republican party in 1892. Gaither's tenure as Attorney General of Maryland began in 1899, and around 1900, he served as a Baltimore City Commissioner. He also held a position as a member and president of the Second Branch City Council in Baltimore. In the 1907 Maryland gubernatorial election, Gaither ran as the Republican candidate for governor of Maryland but was not elected.

== Personal life ==
An Episcopalian, Gaither married Fannie Imogen Granger. The couple had three children, George R. Gaither III, H. Granger, and Mrs. W. L. Van Schiak. The family was based in Baltimore where Gaither was involved with Grace and St. Peter's Church.

Gaither died of pneumonia on October 17, 1921, in Catonsville, Baltimore County. He was interred in Green Mount Cemetery in Baltimore.
