= William Shepard Bryan Jr. =

American politician (1859 – 1914)

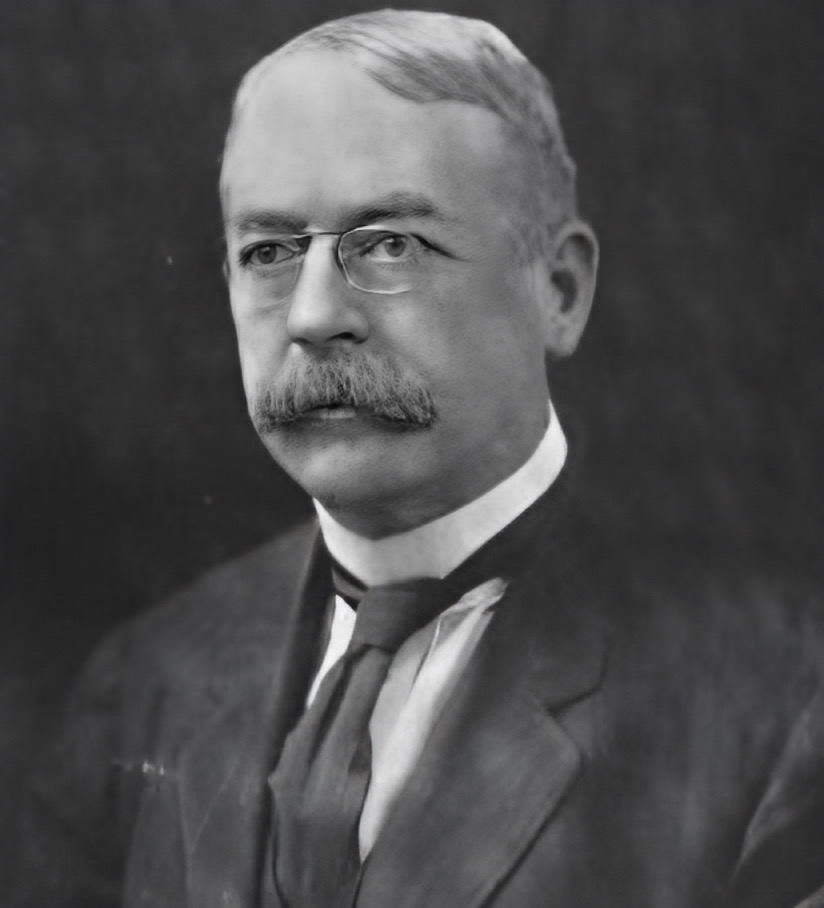

Attorney General of Maryland
- In office 1903–1907
- Governor: John Walter Smith; Edwin Warfield
- Preceded by: Isidor Rayner
- Succeeded by: Isaac Straus

Personal details
- Born: December 23, 1859 Baltimore, Maryland, U.S.
- Died: April 3, 1914 (aged 54) Baltimore, Maryland, U.S.
- Resting place: Green Mount Cemetery
- Party: Democratic
- Parent: William Shepard Bryan (father)
- Education: University of Virginia Law School

William Shepard Bryan Jr. (December 23, 1859 – April 3, 1914) was an American attorney and political figure, recognized for his service in various legal capacities within the city of Baltimore and the state of Maryland. His career included terms as Baltimore City Attorney, City Solicitor, and the Attorney General of Maryland.

== Early life and education ==
William Shepard Bryan, Jr. was born in Baltimore, Maryland, to Elizabeth (née Edmondson) and William S. Bryan. He was the great-great-grandson of William Hayward, a member of the Maryland Court of Delegates. He attended St. Michael's School in Reistertown. He later attended Bethel Military Academy from 1876 to 1879 and graduated from the University of Virginia Law School in 1880 and read law in the office of his father. His nickname was Billy.

== Legal career ==
Bryan's legal career began after he was admitted to the bar in Maryland in 1882. He practiced law in Baltimore and was law partners with George Riggs Gaither Jr. In 1891, he became law partners with Edward N. Rich. He was counsel to the board of supervisors of elections from 1890 to 1892. He served as the Baltimore city attorney in 1892 and was later appointed city solicitor, a position he held from 1892 to 1896.

Bryan was a Democrat. In 1903, he was appointed as the Attorney General of Maryland, a role in which he served until 1907. He was in favor of an independent Maryland Court of Appeals that was elected by the state and not aligned to circuit court duty. He was opposed to the fee system of paying sheriffs, court clerks, and the registers of wills. He disagreed with William Jennings Bryan's desire for railroads to be owned by the government and opposed William Jennings Bryan's bid for president. He was an advisor of Isaac Freeman Rasin. He was a U.S. presidential elector in 1913.

Bryan's law partner at the time of his death was A. deR. Sappington. They were law partners for about 11 years. In 1913, he considered running for the United States Senate, but ultimately decided not to run.

== Personal life ==
Bryan did not marry. In 1911, The Baltimore Sun described him as a club man and a "cloistered student". The paper further quoted Bryan as describing himself as one who "rides a little, drives a little and loafs around his clubs". He was a member of the Maryland and University clubs, the Baltimore Country Club, the old Athenaeum, and the Baltimore Club. He was a fan of baseball and delivered a congratulations speech to the Baltimore Orioles following their championship in the 1894 season.

Bryan died of a cerebral hemorrhage on April 3, 1914, at Mount Royal Apartment House in Baltimore. He was interred at Green Mount Cemetery in Baltimore.
