= Emerson Harrington =

American politician (1864-1945)

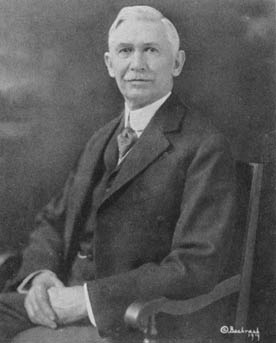

Chair of the National Governors Association
- In office 1918–1919
- Preceded by: Arthur Capper
- Succeeded by: Henry Justin Allen

48th Governor of Maryland
- In office January 12, 1916 – January 14, 1920
- Preceded by: Phillips Goldsborough
- Succeeded by: Albert Ritchie

23rd Comptroller of Maryland
- In office January 10, 1912 – January 12, 1916
- Governor: Phillips Goldsborough
- Preceded by: Charles H. Stanley
- Succeeded by: Hugh A. McMullen

Personal details
- Born: Emerson Columbus Harrington; March 26, 1864 Madison, Maryland, U.S.
- Died: December 15, 1945 (aged 81) Cambridge, Maryland, U.S.
- Party: Democratic
- Spouse: Gertrude Johnson
- Children: 3
- Education: St. John's College, Maryland (BA, MA)

Emerson Columbus Harrington (March 26, 1864 – December 15, 1945) was an American politician who served as the 48th governor of Maryland from 1916 to 1920. He also served as Comptroller of the Maryland Treasury from 1912 to 1916.

== Early life, career, and family ==
Emerson Harrington was born to John E. Harrington and Elizabeth Thompson Harrington in the town of Madison in Dorchester County, Maryland. He attended the public schools of Madison until he turned 16, at which point he went on to attend St. John's College in Annapolis, Maryland. He received a bachelor's degree in 1884 and a master's degree two years later. He became a tutor at the college after graduation, and, as a result of an instructor falling ill, was elected to be an assistant professor. Before assuming his new position, he accepted a position as principal at the Cambridge Academy, a position he served in for 12 years. He married Gertrude Johnson on June 27, 1893, and with her had three children, Emerson C. Jr., Mary Virginia, and William Johnson.

== State political career ==
After studying law, Harrington was admitted to the bar in 1898 and commenced practice soon thereafter. He worked with Frederick Douglass St. Clair Sr., an African American. In 1899, he was elected as the State's Attorney for Dorchester County, and served in that position until his election defeat in 1903. As state's attorney, Harrington gained a reputation as a hard-liner, and was an aggressive prosecutor. This, along with party conflict, contributed to his defeat.

Harrington resumed the practice of law in Cambridge, Maryland in 1903. In 1910, he was appointed as Insurance Commissioner, a position he served in until he was elected Comptroller of Maryland in 1911. During the election, he defeated Republican challenger John A. Cunningham by 7,800 votes. Harrington was re-elected two years later, defeating challenger Oliver Metzerott by a comfortable margin.

== Governor of Maryland ==
In 1915, Harrington chose to run for Governor of Maryland. During the heated Democratic primary, Harrington's opponent Blair Lee I accused him of poorly managing the state's finances during his tenure as Comptroller, and Baltimore Mayor James H. Preston spoke ill of Harrington regarding his handling of a dispute between Baltimore City and Pennsylvania Railroad. The disputes were settled, however, and Harrington won the Democratic primary. During the general election, Harrington defeated Republican Ovington E. Weller by 3,181 votes and was sworn in as governor on January 12, 1916.

As governor, one of Harrington's primary initiatives was to establish a ferry service between the Eastern Shore and Annapolis. The Claiborne-Annapolis Ferry Company began service in June 1919, and the first ferry was named after the governor. During World War I, Harrington established the Council of Defense, which assisted in the establishment of armories throughout the state, including at the Maryland Agricultural College. The council also lobbied for the creation of a military base, which later became Fort George G. Meade.

Regarding social issues of his era, Harrington's views on women's suffrage and prohibition caused surprise to many Marylanders. In a state that was widely considered to be "wet", or in favor of legal alcohol, Harrington caused a great deal of upheaval when he announced his support of prohibition, citing concerns for the common welfare. He also surprised his constituents with his support of the proposal to grant voting rights to women, even though he was believed to be against such an initiative. He allowed the execution of John Snowden to proceed despite controversy. Snowden was pardoned posthumously due to inconsistencies in the case. Harrington met with a "colored" girl and her mother during a debate over the death penalty imposed on her alleged attacker.

Harrington was a believer in positive state action, once expressing his belief to the General Assembly of Maryland that “The time has come when the State ought to endeavor to get at the causes of existing misfortunes and evils: and remove, if possible, the causes. The causes of insanity, the cause of tuberculosis, and the causes of poverty should receive careful consideration. Only by removing these causes will these evils he finally lessened, and the cost to the State reduced.”

Harrington's term as governor ended on January 14, 1920, and afterwards he returned to his law practice. He remained active in politics, but was unsuccessful in an election for judge of the First Judicial Circuit in 1926, and was again unsuccessful in an election for the First Congressional District of Maryland.

Harrington served as President of the People's Loan, Savings and Deposit Bank of Cambridge, Maryland, and also as the President of the President of the Annapolis-Claiborne Ferry Company he had helped establish as governor. He held the position until operations were taken over by the state.

He died at his home in December 1945 from a short illness and was buried in the cemetery of the Christ Episcopal Church in Cambridge, Maryland.

Political offices
Preceded by Charles H. Stanley	Comptroller of Maryland; 1912–1916	Succeeded by Hugh A. McMullen
Preceded by Phillips Goldsborough	Governor of Maryland; 1916–1920	Succeeded by Albert Ritchie
Preceded by Arthur Capper	Chair of the National Governors Association; 1918–1919	Succeeded by Henry Justin Allen
Party political offices
Preceded by Arthur Pue Gorman Jr.	Democratic nominee for Governor of Maryland; 1915	Succeeded by Albert Ritchie
