= Isidor Rayner =

American politician (1850-1912)

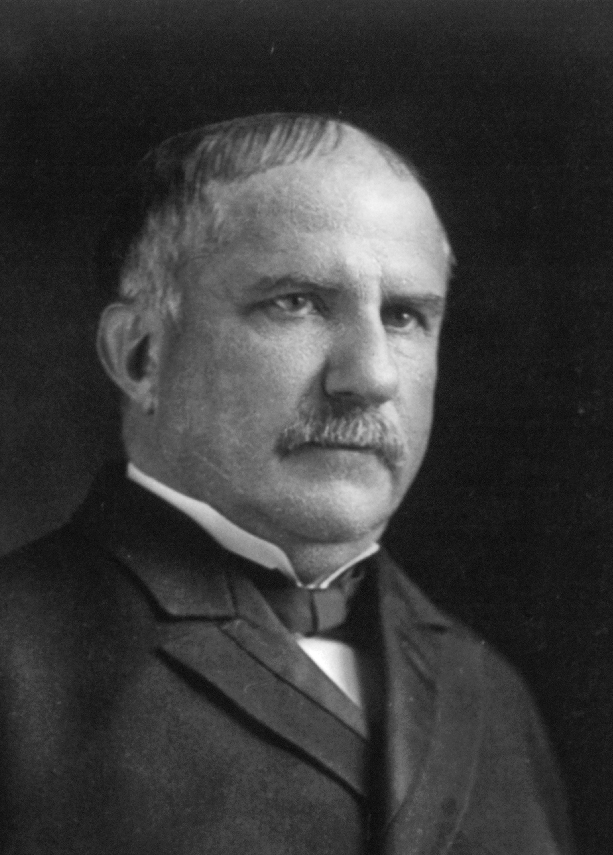

United States Senator from Maryland
- In office March 4, 1905 – November 25, 1912
- Preceded by: Louis E. McComas
- Succeeded by: William P. Jackson

Member of the U.S. House of Representatives from Maryland's 4th district
- In office March 4, 1887 – March 3, 1889
- Preceded by: John Van Lear Findlay
- Succeeded by: Henry Stockbridge, Jr.
- In office March 4, 1891 – March 3, 1895
- Preceded by: Henry Stockbridge, Jr.
- Succeeded by: John K. Cowen

Attorney General of Maryland
- In office 1899–1903
- Governor: Lloyd Lowndes Jr. John W. Smith
- Preceded by: George Riggs Gaither Jr.
- Succeeded by: William Shepard Bryan Jr.

Member of the Maryland Senate
- In office 1885-1886

Member of the Maryland House of Delegates
- In office 1878-1884

Personal details
- Born: April 11, 1850 Baltimore, Maryland, U.S.
- Died: November 25, 1912 (aged 62) Washington, D.C., U.S.
- Resting place: Rock Creek Cemetery; Washington, D.C., U.S.
- Party: Democratic

Isidor Rayner (April 11, 1850 – November 25, 1912) was a Democratic member of the United States Senate, representing the State of Maryland from 1905 to 1912. He also represented the Fourth Congressional District of Maryland from 1887 to 1889, and 1891 to 1895.

Rayner was born into a German-Jewish family in Baltimore, Maryland, and attended local private schools. He later attended the University of Maryland, Baltimore, and the University of Virginia. He began to study law and was admitted to the Maryland bar in 1871.

Rayner was elected to the Maryland House of Delegates and served from 1878 to 1884. In 1885, he was elected to the Maryland State Senate, serving one year until 1886.

Rayner was elected the same year to the 50th United States Congress. He was an unsuccessful candidate for reelection in 1888 to the 51st Congress, but was victorious in the next two elections to the 52nd and 53rd Congresses. He declined to be a candidate for renomination in 1894.

Five years later in 1899, Rayner was chosen to be the Attorney General of Maryland, serving until 1903. He was elected as a Democrat in 1905 to the U.S. Senate, and was reelected again in 1911. While senator, he served as chairman of the Committee on Indian Depredations (Sixty-second Congress).

In 1912, Rayner died in Washington, D.C., while serving as senator, causing a by-election in which Blair Lee I became the first directly elected senator. He is buried at Rock Creek Cemetery.

== See also ==
- List of Jewish American jurists
- List of Jewish members of the United States Congress
- List of members of the United States Congress who died in office (1900–1949)

U.S. House of Representatives
Preceded by John Van Lear Findlay	Member of the U.S. House of Representatives from Maryland's 4th congressional district 1887–1889	Succeeded by Henry Stockbridge, Jr.
Preceded by Henry Stockbridge, Jr.	Member of the U.S. House of Representatives from Maryland's 4th congressional district 1891–1895	Succeeded by John Kissig Cowen
Legal offices
Preceded by George Riggs Gaither Jr.	Attorney General of Maryland; 1899–1903	Succeeded by William Shepard Bryan Jr.
U.S. Senate
Preceded by Louis E. McComas	U.S. senator (Class 1) from Maryland; 1905–1912; Served alongside: Arthur Pue Gorman, William Pinkney Whyte, John Walter Smith	Succeeded by William P. Jackson
