= Poe (surname) =

Poe is a surname commonly found in the United States. The most famous bearer of the name was American writer Edgar Allan Poe (1809–1849), the grandson of an immigrant from County Cavan, Ireland. The name has also been used as an Anglicization of the German surname Pfau and of the Catalan surname Pou.

Poe or Poé may refer to:

== People ==
- Adam Poe (born 1747/1749, Revolutionary War soldier and frontiersman
- Alexander Poe (born 1974), United States Virgin Islands bobsledder
- Amos Poe (1949–2025), American film director and screenwriter
- Andrew Jackson Poe (1851–1920), American painter
- Andy Poe (1943–1995), Filipino actor
- Art Poe (1879–1951), American football player and businessman
- Billy Poe (born 1964), American football player
- Bob Poe (born 1954), American politician and businessman
- Bobby Poe (a.k.a. The Poe Kat; 1933–2011), American vocalist and guitarist
- Bonnie Poe (1912–1993), American actor and voice artist
- Brian Poe (born 1992), American journalist
- Bryce Poe II (1924–2000), American air force general
- Clarence Hamilton Poe (1881–1964), American editor, author, and Progressive-Era reformer
- Conrad Poe (1948–2010), Filipino actor
- David Poe Jr. (1784–1811), American actor; father of writer Edgar Allan Poe
- Dontari Poe (born 1980), American football player
- Ebenezer W. Poe (1846–1898), American politician
- Edgar Allan Poe (1809–1849), American writer, poet, editor, and literary critic
- Edgar Allan Poe (attorney general) (1871–1961), attorney general
- Edgar Allen Poe Newcomb (1846–1923), Architect and music composer
- Eliza Poe (née Arnold, 1787–1811), British actress; mother of writer Edgar Allan Poe
- Fernando Poe Jr. (1939–2004), Filipino actor, film director, and politician
- Fernando Poe Sr. (1916–1951), Filipino actor
- George Poe (1846–1914), American chemist
- Gertrude Poe (1915–2017), American journalist and lawyer
- Gina R. Poe (born ?), American neuroscientist and sleep researcher
- Grace Poe (born 1968), Filipina politician
- Gresham Poe (1880–1956), American football player and coach
- Harry Lee Poe (born ?), American author and Edgar Allan Poe scholar
- Heather Poe (born ?), wife of Mary Cheney, one of the daughters of Dick Cheney
- James Poe (1921–1980), American film and television screenwriter
- Jean Morel Poé (born 1996), Ivorian footballer
- Jesse Poe (born 1975), American singer and songwriter
- John Poe (disambiguation), several people
- Jonathon M. Poe (1989), American Author- Reverend
- Kay Poe (born 1982), American taekwondo practitioner and Olympics competitor
- Lauren Poe (born 1970/71), American politician
- Lavinia Marian Fleming Poe (1890–1974), American lawyer; first African-American female lawyer in Virginia
- Leonard Poe (1590–1631), English physician
- Lovi Poe (born 1989), Filipino actor, model, and recording artist
- Lugné-Poe (1869–1940), French actor and director
- Marshall Poe (born 1961), American historian, educator, writer, and editor
- Michelle Poe (born ?), American guitarist, member of the band Burns & Poe
- Neilson Poe (1809–1884), American judge
- Neilson Poe (American football) (1876–1963), American football player and WWI soldier
- Orlando Metcalfe Poe (1832–1895), American Civil War army officer and engineer
- Raymond Poe (born 1944), American politician
- Richard Poe (born 1946), American actor
- Ron Poe (born 1942), American football coach
- Samuel Poe (fl.1882–1884), American football player
- Ted Poe (born 1948), American politician, lawyer, and judge
- Tef Poe (a.k.a. Kareem Jackson; born 1983), American rapper
- Tony Poe (a.k.a. Anthony Poshepny; 1924–2003), American paramilitary operations officer
- Virginia Eliza Clemm Poe (1822–1847), wife and first cousin of Edgar Allan Poe
- Washington Poe (1800–1876), American politician and lawyer
- Wilford B. Poe (born 1937), American academic
- William F. Poe (1931–2014), American politician and businessman
- William Henry Leonard Poe (1807–1831), American sailor and poet

== In fiction ==
- Albert Poe, character in Daniel Handler's A Series of Unfortunate Events novels
- Arthur Poe, main character in Daniel Handler's A Series of Unfortunate Events novels
- Cameron Poe, lead role in the 1998 American film Con Air
- Edgar Poe, character in Daniel Handler's A Series of Unfortunate Events novels
- Eleanora Poe, character in Daniel Handler's A Series of Unfortunate Events novels
- Eleanore Poe, character in Daniel Handler's A Series of Unfortunate Events novels
- Everett Poe, role in eponymously titled 2007 episode of the television show Nip/Tuck
- Phineas Poe, lead character in the Phineas Poe (2005) novella collection by Will Christopher Baer
- Poe Dameron, from the Star Wars film franchise

== See also ==
- Hoe-poe-kaw (a.k.a. Glory of the Morning; died c.1832), Ho-Chunk Chief
- Percy Poe Bishop (1877–1967), American major general
- Poe Ballantine (a.k.a. Edwin Hughes; born 1955), American novelist and essayist
- Poe brothers, six American football players who played at Princeton University
- Poe Ei Ei Khant (born 1993), Burmese actress and singer
- Poe Kyar Phyu Khin (born 1992), Burmese actor and model
- Poe Mi (born 1988), Burmese singer-songwriter
- Poe (singer) (a.k.a. Anne Decatur Danielewski; born 1967), American singer, songwriter, and record producer
- Poe Toasters, people who anonymously pay tribute to Edgar Allan Poe on the anniversary of Poe's birthday
- Saw Mutu Say Poe (born ?), Karen army general
