= 1911 Maryland Attorney General election =

- November 7, 1911
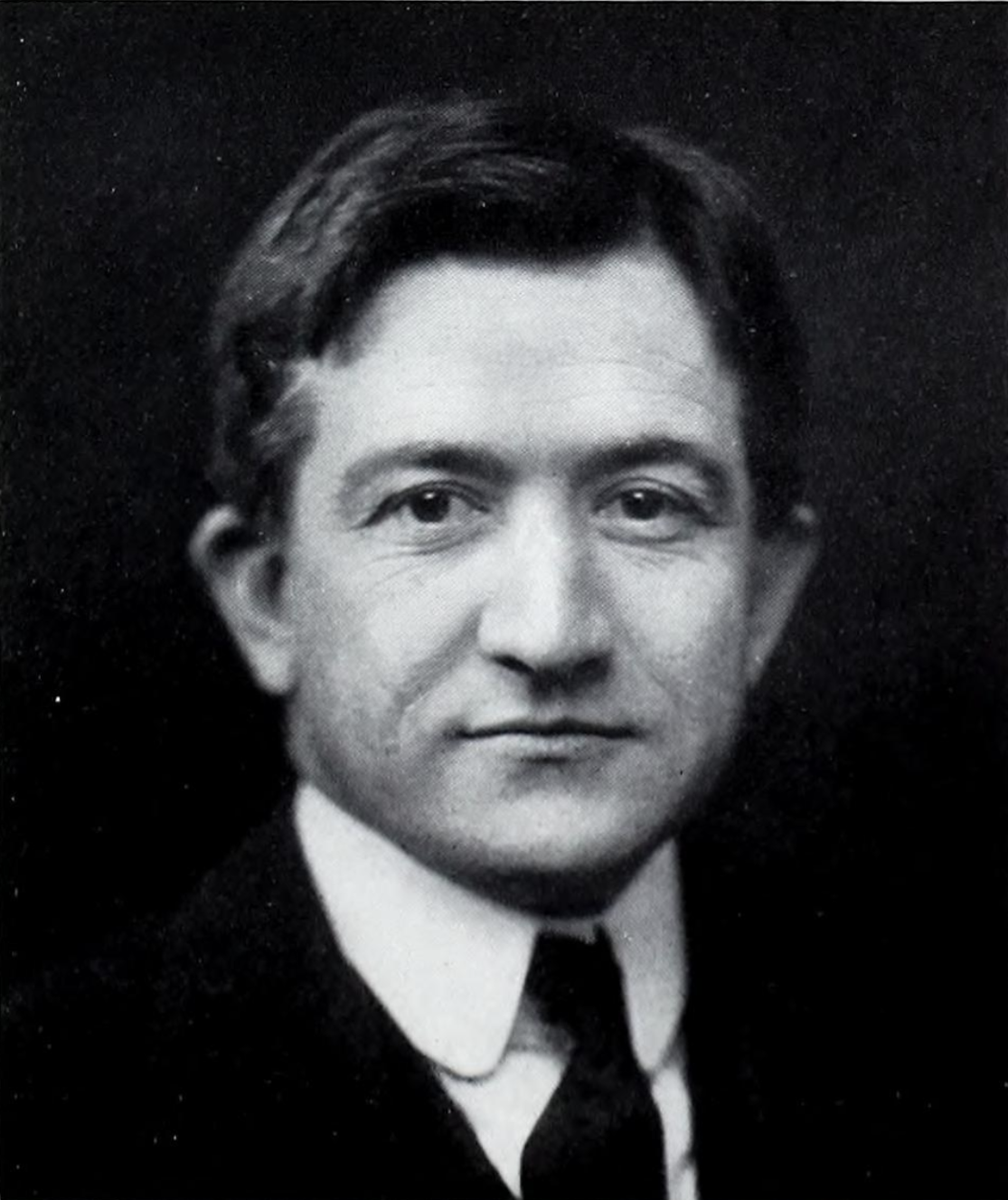
Nominee	Edgar Allan Poe
Party	Democratic
Popular vote	Unknown
Percentage	100.00%
- County results Poe: 90–100%
Attorney General before election
Isaac Lobe Straus
Democratic
Elected Attorney General
Edgar Allan Poe
Democratic

The 1911 Maryland attorney general election was held on November 7, 1911, in order to elect the attorney general of Maryland. Democratic nominee Edgar Allan Poe won the election as he ran unopposed. The exact results of this election are unknown.

== General election ==
On election day, November 7, 1911, Democratic nominee Edgar Allan Poe won the election as he ran unopposed, thereby retaining Democratic control over the office of attorney general. Poe was sworn in as the 26th attorney general of Maryland on January 3, 1912.

=== Results ===
Maryland Attorney General election, 1911
Party	Candidate	Votes	%
Democratic	Edgar Allan Poe	Unknown	100.00
Total votes		Unknown	100.00
Democratic hold			
