= Attorney General Poe =

Attorney General Poe may refer to:

- Edgar Allan Poe (Maryland attorney general) (1871–1961), Attorney General of Maryland
- John P. Poe Sr. (1836–1909), Attorney General of Maryland
