= 1907 Maryland Attorney General election =

- November 5, 1907
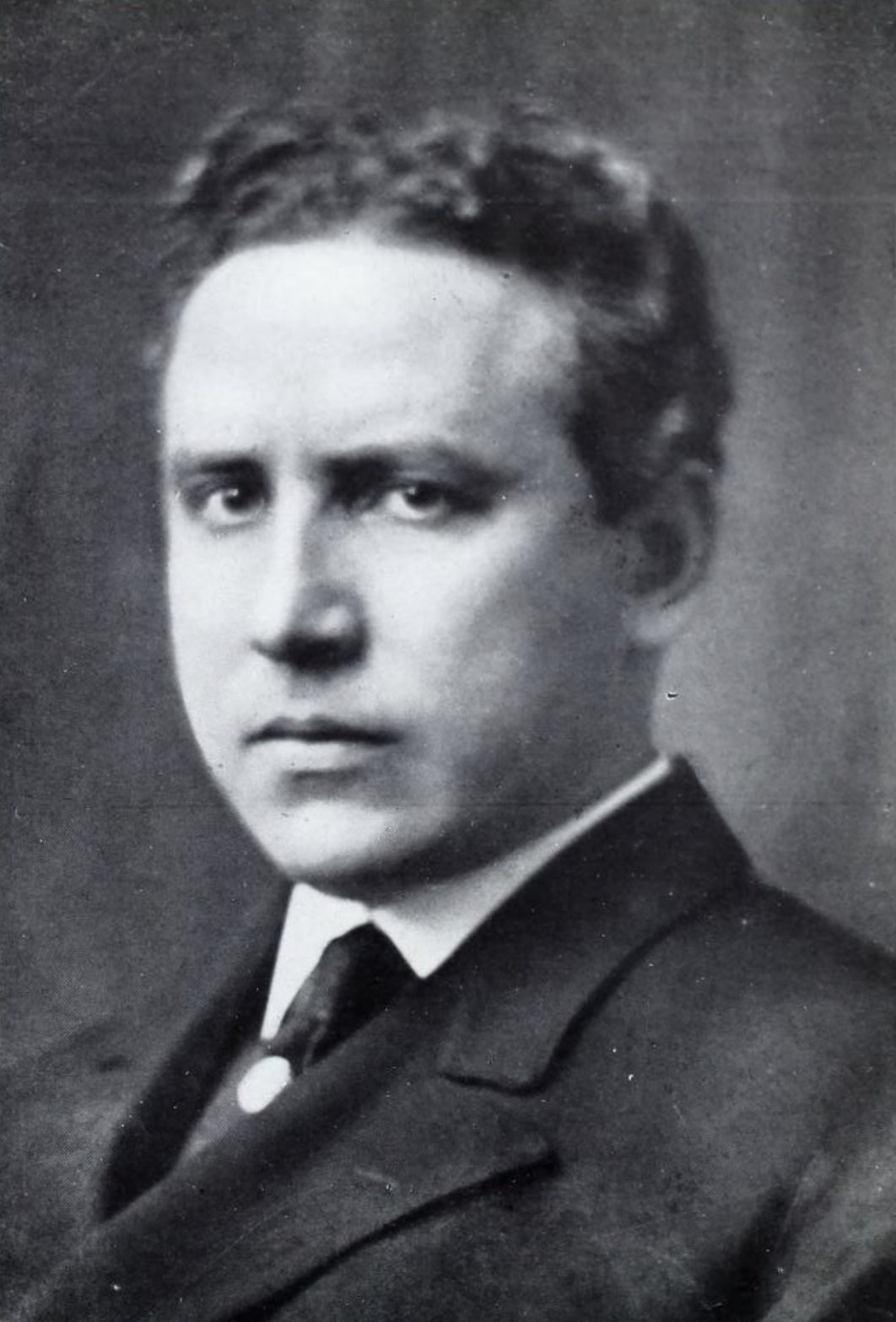

Nominee	Isaac Lobe Straus	Hammond Urner
Party	Democratic	Republican
Popular vote	97,628	85,188
Percentage	51.70%	45.11%
- County results Straus: 50–60% 60–70% Urner: 40–50% 50–60% 60–70%
Attorney General before election
William Shepard Bryan Jr.
Democratic
Elected Attorney General
Isaac Lobe Straus
Democratic

The 1907 Maryland attorney general election was held on November 5, 1907, in order to elect the attorney general of Maryland. Democratic nominee and former member of the Maryland House of Delegates Isaac Lobe Straus defeated Republican nominee Hammond Urner, Socialist nominee Charles B. Backman and Prohibition nominee Harry E. Gillbert.

== General election ==
On election day, November 5, 1907, Democratic nominee Isaac Lobe Straus won the election by a margin of 12,440 votes against his foremost opponent Republican nominee Hammond Urner, thereby retaining Democratic control over the office of attorney general. Straus was sworn in as the 25th attorney general of Maryland on January 3, 1908.

=== Results ===
Maryland Attorney General election, 1907
Party	Candidate	Votes	%
Democratic	Isaac Lobe Straus	97,628	51.70
Republican	Hammond Urner	85,188	45.11
Socialist	Charles B. Backman	4,303	2.28
Prohibition	Harry E. Gillbert	1,722	0.91
Total votes		188,841	100.00
Democratic hold			
