= John Poe =

John Poe may refer to:

- Johnnie Poe (born 1959), American football player
- Johnny Poe (1874–1915), American football player, coach, US Marine, and soldier of fortune
- John Poe (fl.1980s–1990s), American drummer for Guadalcanal Diary (band)
- John Poe (fl.c.1862–1870s), American promoter and gold prospector; namesake of Poeville, Nevada
- John P. Poe Sr. (1836–1909), American jurist and politician
  - SS John P. Poe, a Liberty ship
