= Johnny Poe =

American football player and coach, soldier, Marine, and soldier of fortune (1874-1915)

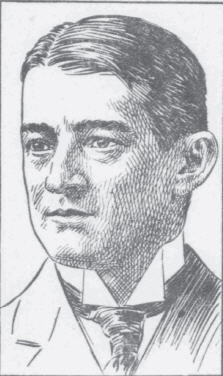
- Poe pictured in The Official National Collegiate Athletic Association football guide, 1893

Profile
- Positions: Halfback, Quarterback

Personal information
- Born: February 26, 1874; Baltimore, Maryland, U.S.
- Died: September 25, 1915 (aged 41) near Loos, France

Career information
- College: Princeton

Career history

Playing
- 1891–1892: Princeton

Coaching
- 1893–1894: Virginia
- 1896–1896: Navy
- 1897: Princeton (assistant)
- 1902–1903: Princeton (assistant)
- 1906: Princeton (assistant)
- 1908–1909: Princeton (assistant)

Awards and highlights
- Head coaching record: 21–8

Other information
- Military career
- Relatives: Edgar Allan Poe (cousin); John P. Poe, Sr. (father); Edgar A. Poe (brother); Art Poe (brother); Gresham Poe (brother); Bradley T. Johnson (cousin)
- Allegiance: United States; Honduras (United Kingdom) Great Britain
- Branch: U.S. Army; U.S. Marine Corps; Honduran Army; British Army
- Service years: 1898; 1898–1899; 1903; 1907–1908; 1914-1915
- Rank: Corporal (USA); Captain (Honduras); Private (Great Britain)
- Units: 5th Maryland Infantry; 23rd U. S. Infantry; Kentucky National Guard; Royal Garrison Artillery the Black Watch
- Conflicts: Spanish–American War; Philippine–American War; Black Patch Wars; Banana Wars; World War I
- Other work: cowboy, miner

John Prentiss Poe Jr. (February 26, 1874 – September 25, 1915) was an American college football player and coach, soldier, Marine, and soldier of fortune, whose exploits on the gridiron and the battlefield contributed to the lore and traditions of the Princeton Tigers football program.

== Biography ==
=== Family ===
Prentiss, known as "Johnny", was born February 26, 1874, in Baltimore, Maryland, to John Prentiss Poe Sr., and Anne Johnson Hough. He was the third of six sons in a family that also included three daughters. John Sr. was a prominent attorney, and relative of the American writer and poet, Edgar Allan Poe. John Sr. was an 1856 graduate of Princeton University and would later serve as Attorney General of Maryland. Anne Hough was from a Maryland family who supported the Confederacy during the American Civil War. Her nephew, Bradley T. Johnson served as a Confederate general, and her brother, Gresham Hough, fought with Mosby's raiders.

All six Poe brothers attended The Carey School for Boys which later became the Boys' Latin School of Baltimore and all wound up playing football for Princeton. The oldest, S. Johnson Poe, played halfback and also played on Princeton's national champion lacrosse team. The second son, Edgar A. Poe, was captain of the football team, and later served as Attorney General of Maryland, like his father. The fourth son, Neilson Poe, also played halfback. Fifth son, Arthur Poe, was voted into the College Football Hall of Fame in 1969. Finally, the sixth son, Gresham Poe, played quarterback, and followed Johnny as head coach at Virginia.

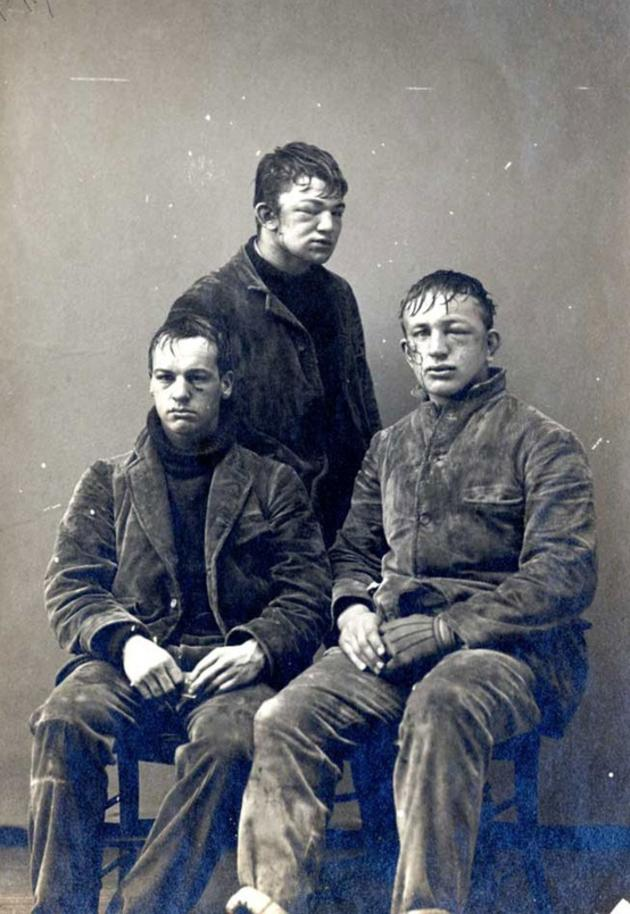
Three students after a snowball fight in 1893; Poe pictured top center, Art Wheeler on right

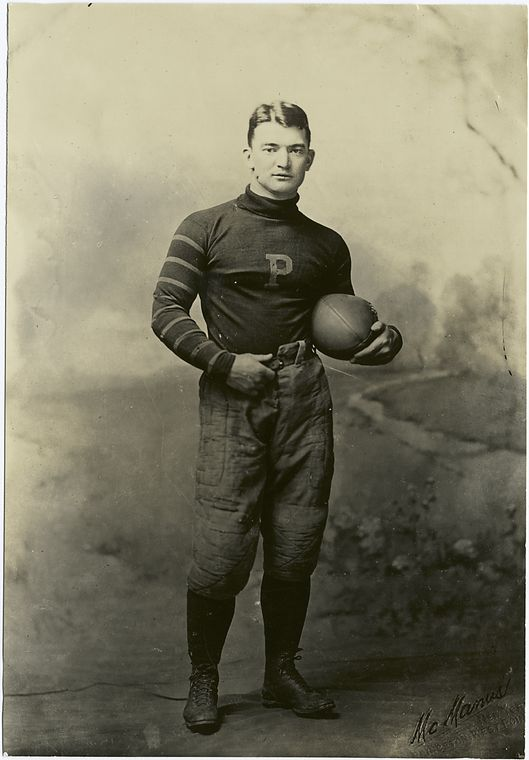
Princeton, circa 1892

=== College football career ===
Poe enrolled at Princeton University in the fall of 1891, and was elected president of the freshman class. In spite of his small size, he made the varsity football team at halfback, and finished the season tied for third in touchdowns scored for the team. However, he struggled academically, and was asked to leave in the Spring. When he left for home, the entire freshman class escorted him to the train station.

He re-enrolled the following Fall, and started at quarterback, moving to halfback midway through the season. Poe played even better than in his freshman year, finishing second on the team for touchdowns scored. However, he was once again forced to leave the university for scholastic reasons.

After leaving Princeton, Poe bounced around, coaching two seasons at Virginia, working for a steamboat operator, selling real estate, coaching the Navy football team, and serving as an assistant coach at Princeton. Poe would often return to Princeton as an assistant coach, including the National Championship season of 1903. It was while serving as an assistant coach that Poe is credited with saying "If you won't be beat, you can't be beat," which became the team motto for many seasons.

=== Soldier, adventurer ===
Poe enlisted in the Fifth Maryland Infantry Regiment, and after over three years had risen to the rank of corporal, when the United States declared war on Spain on April 25, 1898. His regiment was mustered into Federal service on May 14, and sent to Tampa, Florida, on June 3, in preparation for an invasion of Cuba. However, the regiment was unable to obtain transport to Cuba, and spent the war in Tampa, and later in Huntsville, Alabama, before being mustered out of service on October 22. Poe worked as a cowpuncher in New Mexico, but longed for action and enlisted in the Regular Army's 23rd Infantry. He was sent to the island of Sulu in the Philippines, where he served in Company F and as an orderly on General Bates' staff, seeing none of the action he had been hoping for. Declining to apply for a commission, Poe instead asked his father to buy out his enlistment, and worked as a surveyor in Baltimore for a few months before returning to New Mexico.

In 1903, Poe joined the Kentucky National Guard, his detachment of which was sent to Princeton, Kentucky, to suppress uprisings which led to the "Black Patch Wars". Later that year, he wrote to the Commandant of the Marine Corps, volunteering his services in the looming Panamanian revolution. He was enlisted and sailed for Panama aboard the USS Dixie, but saw no action, and he returned to the United States. There, he engaged briefly in the coal-mining business in Charleston, West Virginia, before moving to Tonopah, Nevada, to engage in silver mining there.

Hearing that war was breaking out between Honduras and Nicaragua, Poe left Nevada in 1907, intending to join the Nicaraguan Army. However, when his ship reached Honduras, anxious that the war was ending, he joined the Honduran Army. He was made a captain and put in charge of a gun in the siege of Amapala. The war ended with the defeat of Honduran forces, and Poe returned to Nevada and mining. The following year found him with General Rafael de Nogales Méndez on a filibustering expedition in Venezuela against the dictator, Cipriano Castro. Méndez eventually ran afoul of the new president, Juan Vicente Gómez, and went into exile. Poe returned once again to his mining interest, taking a two-year break, however, to join an expedition to survey the boundary between Alaska and Canada.

=== Death ===
Within days of Britain's entry into World War I, Poe volunteered for the British Army and was assigned to the Royal Garrison Artillery, where he served in France for the remainder of 1914 and the first part of 1915. By then he had decided that artillery was too far behind the lines, and had himself transferred to the Black Watch, a famous Scottish infantry regiment, known to the Germans as the "Ladies from Hell" for the kilts they wore and their ferocity.

In the opening hours of the Battle of Loos, on the morning of September 25, 1915, Poe was with a detachment carrying bombs to another regiment and was part way across an open field, when he was struck in the stomach by a bullet and killed. He was later buried there, between the German and British lines. However, his friends and relatives were never able to locate his grave.

== Legacy ==
Poe's name was entered into the Black Watch roll of honor at Edinburgh Castle. At Princeton, Poe field was named in his honor. Given annually and established by Poe's mother, the "John Prentiss Poe, Jr. Memorial Football Cup" (presently known as the Poe-Kazmaier Trophy) is the highest award given to a Princeton football player.

== Head coaching record ==
Year	Team	Overall	Conference	Standing	Bowl/playoffs
Virginia Orange and Blue (Independent) (1893–1894)
1893	Virginia	8–3			
1894	Virginia	8–2			
Virginia:		16–5			
Navy Midshipmen (Independent) (1896)
1896	Navy	5–3			
Navy:		5–3			
Total:		21–8			
