= Pfau =

Pfau is a German surname meaning "peacock".

Pfau may refer to:

== People ==
- Sister Edith Pfau (1915–2001), American painter, sculptor and art educator
- Ludwig Pfau (1821–1894), German poet, journalist, and revolutionary
- Ruth Pfau (1929–2017), German nun and medical doctor dedicated to fighting leprosy in Pakistan
- Werner Pfau, German astronomer, former director of the Jena University Observatory, and namesake of asteroid 9962 Pfau
- Horst-Rüdiger Schlöske (born 1946), German sprinter born Horst-Rüdiger Pfau

== Other uses ==
- 9962 Pfau, an asteroid

== See also ==
- Poe (surname), an Anglicized form of Pfau adopted by some German-Americans
