= Adam Poe =

American frontier scout (born 1747/1749)

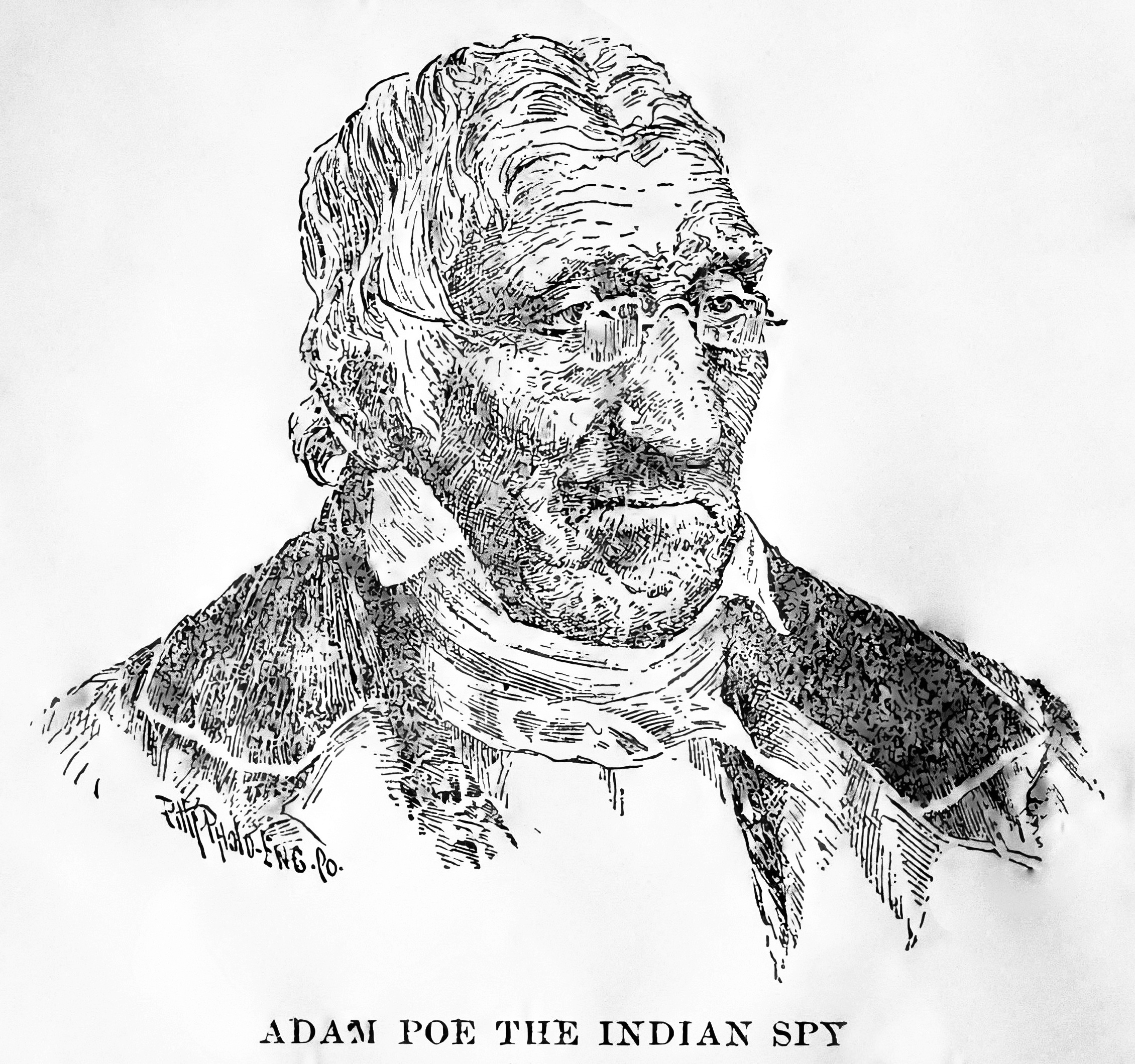
Adam Poe circa 1830

Adam Poe (born Summer 1747/1749 (Note: In family records Adam's birth is often recorded as being "at sea". In such a case his place of birth would have been recorded as where the family landed in America or first settled. This at sea birth may have been his elder brother. The year of his parent's arrival in Maryland is between 1740-1749, possibly 1742. Adam's birth year is not conclusively proven, though Summer of 1747 or in 1749 are most likely.) – died September 23, 1838) was an American frontier scout, militia officer, and Indian spy active along the upper Ohio River during the American Revolutionary War and the War of 1812. Together with his older brother Andrew Poe, he gained widespread fame on the Pennsylvania and Virginia frontier for his military service and his role in a celebrated hand-to-hand engagement with a Wyandot raiding party in September 1781, an encounter that became one of the most-retold episodes of frontier combat in early American history.

Poe was born in Frederick County, Maryland, the son of George Jacob Poe (anglicized from the German Pfau), a Palatine German immigrant who arrived in America around 1742–1746 and established flour mills on the Antietam Creek. In 1772 Adam followed his brother Andrew west to the Pennsylvania frontier, settling near Harmon's Creek in present-day Washington County. He volunteered for frontier militia service in 1776 and served in a succession of Pennsylvania militia companies through 1783, operating primarily as a scout and Indian spy warning isolated settler communities of Native American raids along the upper Ohio Valley.

The engagement for which Poe is best remembered occurred on September 30, 1781, near the mouth of Tomlinson's Run on the upper Ohio River, when Adam and Andrew, pursuing a Wyandot raiding party that had killed a settler and taken a prisoner, became embroiled in a desperate hand-to-hand fight; Adam is credited with killing the war party's imposing leader, known as Bigfoot, after his brother Andrew was severely wounded. Six of the raiding party's seven warriors were killed in the engagement, which was reported up the chain of command to General William Irvine and, ultimately, George Washington.

After further militia service, including a tradition of renewed service in the War of 1812, Poe moved successively through Beaver, Washington, Columbiana, Wayne, and Medina counties before settling in Stark County, Ohio, where he died in 1838. He was the great-grandfather of both Orlando Metcalfe Poe, a U.S. Army engineer who served as Sherman's chief engineer during the March to the Sea and later designed the Poe Lock at the Soo Locks, and the painter Andrew Jackson Poe. Theodore Roosevelt recounted Adam and Andrew's exploits in volume II of The Winning of the West (1889–1896), cementing the episode's place in frontier historiography.

== Early life ==
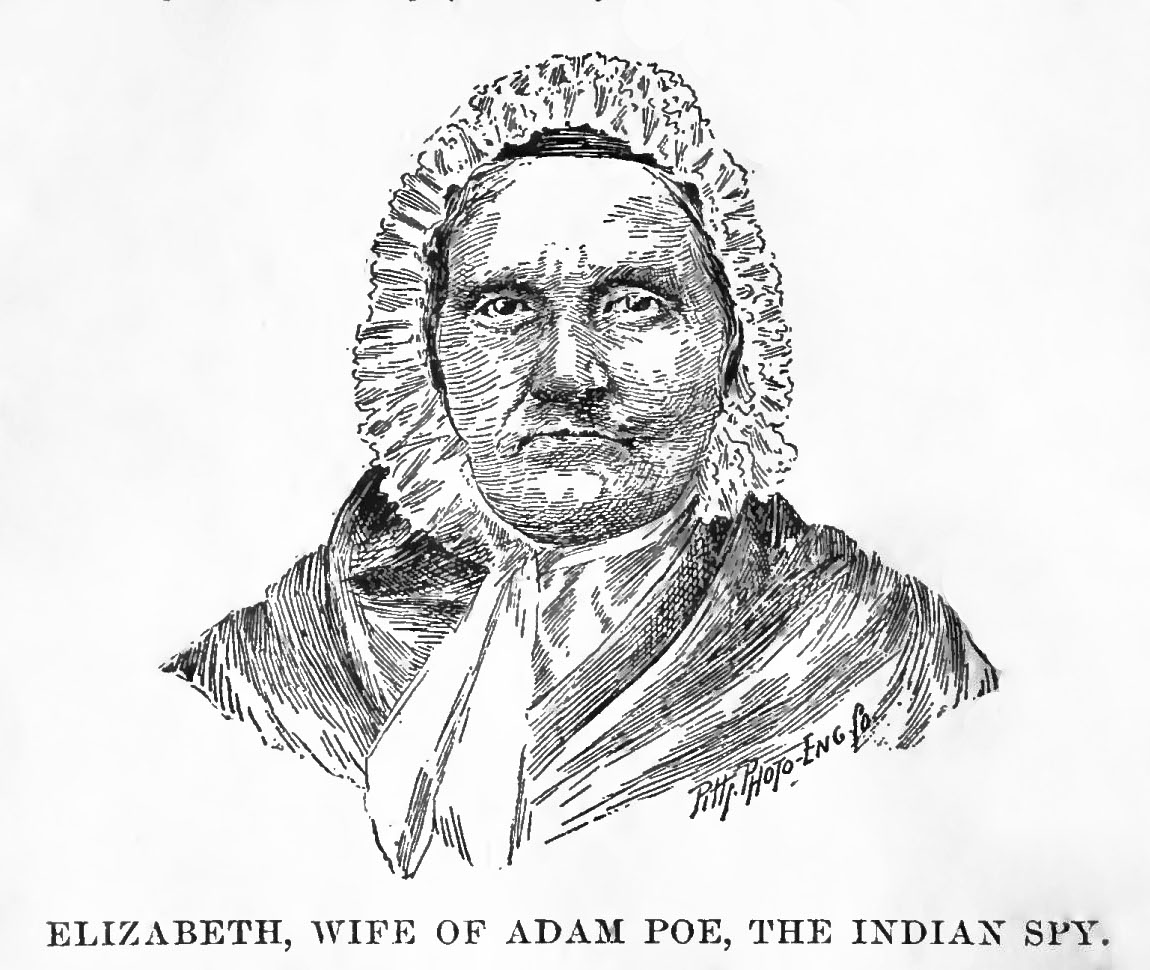
Elizabeth Matthews Poe

Adam Poe was born 1749 in Frederick County, Maryland, the son of George Jacob Poe (anglicized from the German Pfau, which means peacock), an immigrant from the Palatinate region of the Rhine River who arrived in America around 1742–1746 with his wife, Maria Catharina Memminger, (Note: Some sources say his wife was Catherine Elizabeth Mueller.) and at least one child, and subsequently purchased land on the Antietam River where he established flour mills.

George Jacob Pfau was born October 13, 1715 in Billigheim-Ingenheim, Germersheim, Lower Palatinate, Germany, (Note: George Jacob Pfau's parents were Hans Bernhardt Pfau and Maria Eva Werner) and was murdered by an indentured servant, Michael Peck, one of his teamsters, on July 26, 1762 in Lewiston, Frederick County, Maryland. George Jacob Poe's surname was an anglicization of the German Pfau, a naming pattern that is also reflected in the very distantly related Poe family line that produced the writer Edgar Allan Poe.

In accordance with the English custom of primogeniture, the eldest son George Jacob Poe Jr. inherited the family estate. Andrew Poe, the eldest of the younger sons, departed Maryland for the frontier around 1764, settling near Harmon's Creek in what is now Washington County, Pennsylvania, after honing his skills as a woodsman near Fort Pitt at the close of the French and Indian War.

In 1772 Andrew persuaded Adam, then approximately 26, to follow him westward. Adam and a sister, Catherine, traveled with the Wetzel family and initially lived with the John Crist family before settling at Andrew's Harmon's Creek property in 1775. On October 12, 1777, Adam married Elizabeth Matthews, who was the widow of a man named Cochran who apparently had been killed by Indians.

== Military service ==
=== Revolutionary War (1776–1783) ===
Adam Poe volunteered for frontier militia service in the summer of 1776. He served successively as a private in Captain G. McCormick's Company, in Colonel Cannon's Pennsylvania Regiment, in Captain T. Bass's (Bay's) Company, and ultimately in the 7th Company, 4th Battalion, Pennsylvania Militia (Captain Kidd's Company) from 1781 to 1783. He was elected captain under Colonel Marshall to defend the frontier and also served under Colonels Baird and Williamson. Rather than serving in the major pitched battles of the Revolution, Adam and Andrew operated primarily as scouts and Indian spies—a frontier term for intelligence gatherers tasked with observing Native American movements and warning isolated settler communities of impending raids along the upper Ohio River valley. In 1781 Adam and Andrew participated in the Battle of Sheepsgate, where Andrew sustained a wound. Adam applied for a pension on August 31, 1832, under the provisions for Revolutionary War veterans. By 1781 his brother Andrew had become a Lieutenant.

==== Bigfoot Engagement ====
The episode for which Adam Poe is best remembered occurred on September 30, 1781, along the upper Ohio River near the mouth of Tomlinson's Run, on the Virginia side approximately three miles above the head of Brown's Island.

===== Background =====
The Wyandot people—an Iroquoian nation also known as the Huron—had allied with the British during the Revolution and conducted extensive raids into Pennsylvania, northwestern Virginia, and Kentucky, often alongside their Shawnee allies. By 1781, at the climax of the Revolution, such raids were nearly constant. In the fall of 1781, a Wyandot war party of seven warriors crossed the Ohio River, killed an elderly settler, and took a carpenter named William Jackson prisoner, prompting local militia to organize a pursuit.

===== Pursuit and battle =====
Adam and Andrew Poe, along with a posseman named John Cherry and several others, assembled and pursued the raiding party. Adam, suspecting ambush, separated from the main group and approached the river under cover of tall grass. He discovered the Wyandot war party sheltering beneath the river bank beside their raft. The war party included a warrior of exceptional size known as Bigfoot (Marmaduke), described in accounts as a prominent Wyandot chieftain of imposing physical stature. Adam opened fire on the group and attacked; in the close-quarters struggle that followed he is recorded to have dropped his rifle and engaged the warriors with his fists. Andrew arrived and became embroiled in his own desperate hand-to-hand fight with Bigfoot in and along the river, sustaining severe injuries including a tomahawk blow that cut through his wrist and permanently disabled most of the fingers on his right hand, as well as a gunshot wound. Adam, who had run upstream upon hearing Andrew's cries, completed reloading his rifle before Bigfoot could do the same and shot the chieftain through the chest; Bigfoot fell back into the river and his body was swept away by the current. Adam was himself struck by a ball fired by his own comrades, who in the confusion mistook him in the river for an enemy; the wound passed through his right trapezius muscle across his back ribs but was not fatal. (Note: Accounts of the fight vary considerably in detail and in which brother is credited with the fatal shot on Bigfoot, a discrepancy noted by multiple historians and attributable to the episode's long oral transmission within the Poe family before being formally recorded in the mid-19th century. Most detailed narrative reconstructions, including Eckert's, credit Adam with the fatal shot after Andrew was disabled in hand-to-hand combat; some shorter genealogical summaries instead attribute the kill to Andrew.)

===== Outcome =====
Six of the seven Wyandot warriors were killed; one escaped with a wounded hand. Adam is credited with shooting four members of the raiding party including Bigfoot; Andrew killed one and John Cherry killed one before Cherry himself was mortally wounded. The captive Jackson was also struck by a tomahawk during the melee but survived. General William Irvine reported the engagement to George Washington; his dispatch noted that six Wyandots had been killed at Tomlinson's Run. A contemporary witness, Adam Link, who served on the frontier near Wheeling and survived to age 102, later described the Bigfoot episode as the most memorable story of his frontier service.

=== Interim period and moves ===
In 1785 Adam was elected Captain of a company under Colonel Marshall with the mission of defending the frontier. He subsequently served under Colonels Baird and David Williamson until 1794. He then moved to Little Beaver, Beaver County, Pennsylvania, where he stayed until 1801. He then lived in Washington County, Pennsylvania from 1801-1803 and then moved to Columbiana County, Ohio, where he lived until 1813-1814. He then moved to Wayne County, Ohio, living there until 1831, when he moved to Harrisville Township, Medina County, Ohio.

=== War of 1812 ===
Family and local history accounts state that Adam Poe served again during the War of 1812 and was elected Captain, by then in late middle age. (Note: This claim rests primarily on local Beaver County historical tradition rather than surviving service records, and should be treated with appropriate caution pending verification against military pension files. There was another member of this family named Adam, born 1791, for whom pension records prove served in the War of 1812. It is uncertain if these two Adams' history have been confused or if both of these Adams served in that war, or just the one born 1791.)

== Later life and death ==
Adam applied for a pension based on his service in the Revolution on August 31, 1832. He eventually settled in Tuscarawas Township, Stark County, Ohio. He died there in his brother Andrew's home on September 23, 1838. (Note: Family and local histories are not entirely consistent on Adam Poe's exact birth year and age at death; sources generally place his birth around 1747-1749 and his death in 1838, making him roughly 91 at death, though variant traditions exist.)

== Legacy ==
Adam Poe was the great-grandfather of Orlando Metcalfe Poe (1832-1895), a United States Army officer and engineer who served as chief engineer to General William Tecumseh Sherman during the March to the Sea, oversaw the destruction of military infrastructure in Atlanta and Savannah in 1864, and later directed lighthouse construction on the Great Lakes and designed the Poe Lock at the Soo Locks between Lakes Superior and Huron.

Adam Poe was also the great-grandfather of the painter Andrew Jackson Poe (1851 – 1920), making Orlando M. Poe and Andrew Jackson Poe second cousins descended from a common great-grandfather.

Theodore Roosevelt recounted the exploits of Adam and Andrew Poe in volume II of The Winning of the West (1889-1896).
