= Poe brothers =

1882–1901 American football players

The Poe brothers
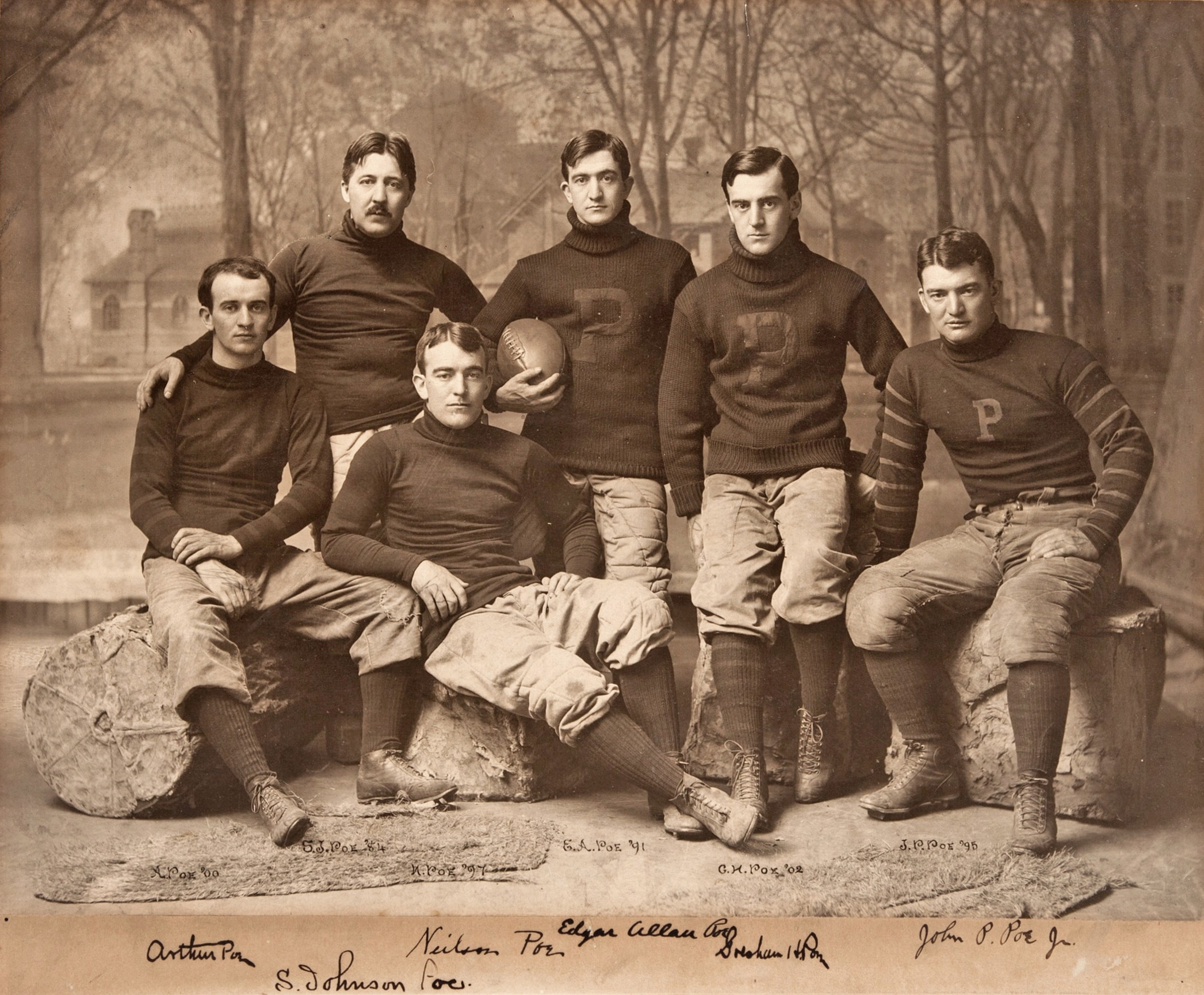
- L to R: Arthur Poe, Samuel Johnson Poe, Neilson (Net) Poe, Edgar Allan Poe, Gresham Poe and John Prentiss Poe Jr.

Career information
- College: Princeton University

Career history
- 1882–1901: Princeton Tigers

The Poe brothers were six American football players who played football at Princeton University from 1882 until 1901. They were sons of John Prentiss Poe, an 1854 Princeton graduate and the Attorney General of Maryland from 1891 until 1895. They were also second cousins, twice removed (see below), of the poet and short story writer Edgar Allan Poe, who died in 1849.

== Brothers ==
- Samuel Johnson Poe, class of 1884, who played halfback from 1882 to 1883
- Edgar Allan Poe, class of 1891, who was an All-American quarterback from 1887 to 1890 and captained the team in his junior and senior years
- John Prentiss Poe Jr., class of 1895, who played halfback from 1891 to 1992, left school for academic reasons, and returned afterwards to coach
- Neilson "Net" Poe, class of 1897, who played in the backfield from 1895 to 1896 and later returned to coach.
- Arthur Poe, class of 1900, who as an All-American end who made the decisive scores that beat rival Yale in two successive years
- Gresham Poe, class of 1902, who played as a substitute on the varsity in 1901

== Accomplishments at Princeton ==
Edgar Allan was the quarterback of the 1889 team, which finished with a perfect 10-0 record. After that season, Poe was named the quarterback of the 1889 College Football All-America Team—the first such team selected. After Princeton beat Harvard, 41-15, a Harvard man reportedly asked a Princeton alumnus whether Poe was related to the great Edgar Allan Poe. According to the story, "the alumnus looked at him in astonishment and replied, 'He is the great Edgar Allan Poe.'"

John Prentiss Poe, Jr. made the varsity football team at halfback as a freshman, and finished the season tied for third in touchdowns scored for the team. However, he struggled academically and was asked to leave in the spring term. He re-enrolled the following fall and started at quarterback, moving to halfback midway through the season. Poe played better in his sophomore year than in the previous season, finishing second on the team for touchdowns scored. However, he was once again forced to leave the university for academic reasons, this time permanently. Poe Field at Princeton was provided in his memory by classmates and friends.

Arthur was selected retroactively by the Helms Athletic Foundation as the national college football player of the year for 1899, and was elected to the College Football Hall of Fame in 1969. He was also named to Walter Camp's All-American football second team in 1898 and first team in 1899. He made the plays that led to victories over Yale in both years. In 1898 he took the ball from a Yale runner's grasp and raced 100 yards for the game's only score. In 1899, with only 30 seconds to play Poe volunteered to attempt a game-winning field goal, despite never having before kicked in a game, because both of Princeton's kickers had been injured and left the game. His kick was good and delivered an 11–10 Princeton victory. Arthur's heroics in the biggest college football games of 1898 and 1899 inspired a book of comic heroic poetry entitled "Poe's Run and Other Poems." In 1914, a Pittsburgh Press article declared the last-minute winning field goal "Football's Greatest Moment".

Gresham Poe almost rallied Princeton back from a 12–0 deficit against Yale in 1901.

== World War I ==
Three of the Poe Brothers fought for the Allied Powers during World War I. Neilson served in the United States Army infantry as a lieutenant. He was wounded in 1918 in a battle, in which his commanding officer was killed. As a result, Neilson safely entrenched his men for 24 hours, while suffering a bullet wound to the stomach and several shrapnel wounds. He was later awarded the French War Cross and the Distinguished Service Cross. Meanwhile, Gresham also served in the U.S. Army in a field artillery unit. Johnny entered the war before America became involved. In 1914 he volunteered for the British Army and was assigned to the Royal Garrison Artillery, in which he served in France for the remainder of 1914 and the first part of 1915. He then decided that artillery was too far behind the lines, and had himself transferred to the Black Watch, a famous Scottish infantry regiment, known to the Germans as the "Ladies from Hell" for the kilts they wore and their ferocity. He was killed in the opening hours of the Battle of Loos, on the morning of September 25, 1915. Meanwhile, Edgar Allen's son, who was also a recent Princeton graduate, Edgar Allan Poe, Jr., was severely wounded in the war while serving as a U.S. Marine Corps second lieutenant in France; however, according to an October 13, 1918, New York Times story, he fully recovered from his wounds within six days.

== Relationship to author Edgar Allan Poe ==
Various sources report that the Poe Brothers of Princeton football fame were either first or second cousins or grand-nephews of the elder Edgar Allan Poe. Due to a bizarrely convoluted family tree, any or all of these descriptions may be said to be true. Through much of his adulthood, the author lived in close contact with his second cousin Neilson, the Poe brothers' grandfather. Edgar Allan and Neilson were born in the same year, and their family connections were so close that they would have been perceived by many outside the family as brothers. The elder Edgar Allan married his own first cousin Virginia Clemm, and the elder Neilson married Virginia's half-sister Josephine Emily Clemm. The six brothers' relationship to the author, through their grandfather Neilson, would be second cousins twice removed (though to one who had perceived the elder Neilson to be the elder Edgar Allan's brother, the assumption may have been made that the six Poe brothers were the author's grand-nephews). But if calculated though the relations of the brothers' grandmother, the brothers would be the grand-half-nephews of the author, since their grandmother was the half-sister of the author's wife. Finally, if calculated through the relationship of their grandmother to Virginia Clemm as the author's first cousin rather than as the author's wife, the six brothers could be said to be first half-cousins, twice removed, to the author.
