= Samuel Poe =

American college football player (1864–1933)

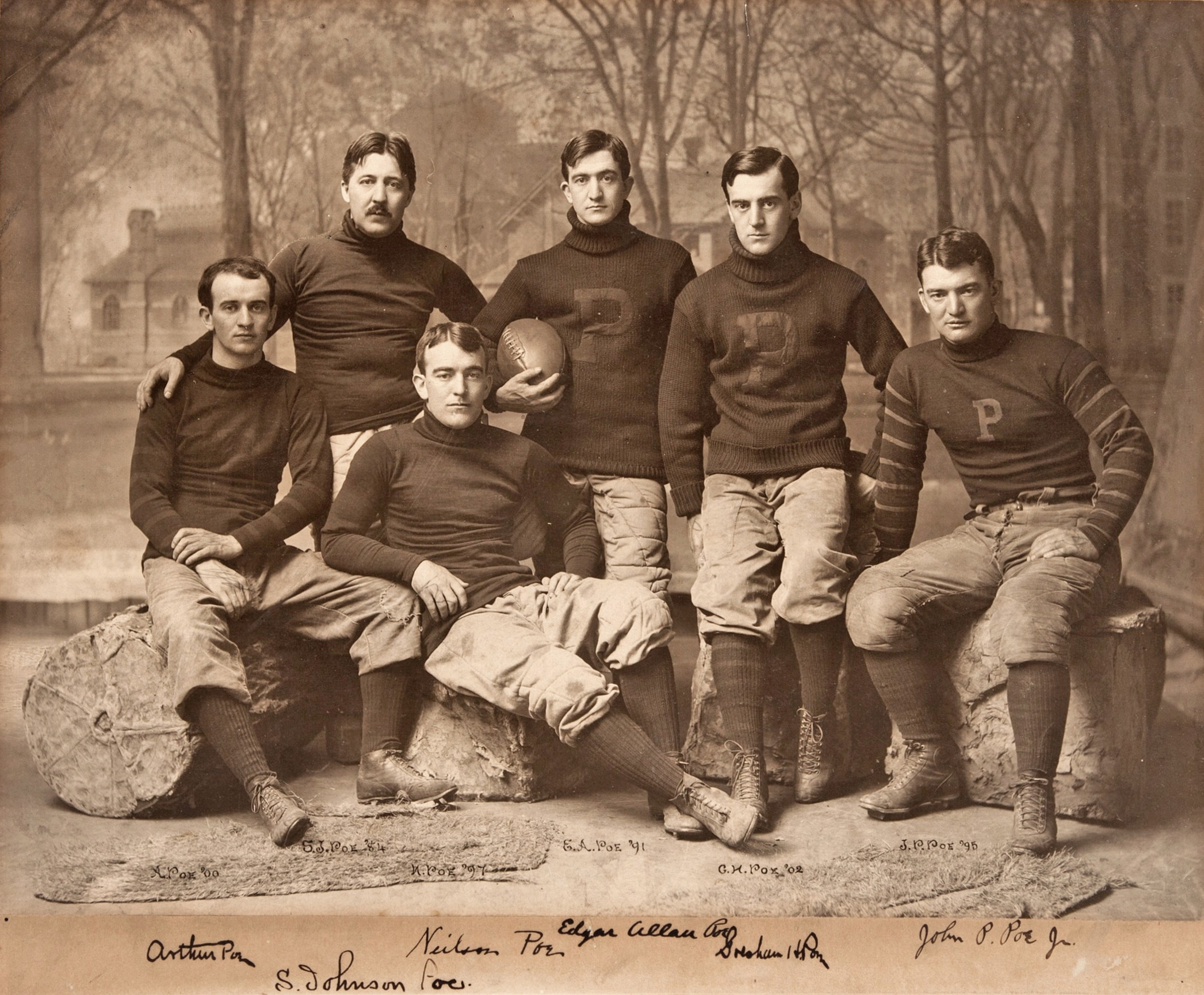
Samuel Poe (leftmost standing figure) with the rest of the football-playing Poe brothers of Princeton

Samuel Johnson Poe (August 27, 1864 – April 10, 1933) was an American college football halfback for the Princeton Tigers in 1882 and 1883. He graduated from Princeton University in 1884, he was also earned All-American honors as a lacrosse player. Samuel was the eldest member of the Poe brothers, six football players at Princeton University from 1882 until 1901. They were sons of John Prentiss Poe, an 1854 Princeton graduate himself and the Attorney General of Maryland from 1891 until 1895. They were also second cousins, twice removed, of the poet Edgar Allan Poe, who died in 1849.
