= Andrew Jackson Poe =

American painter (1851–1920)

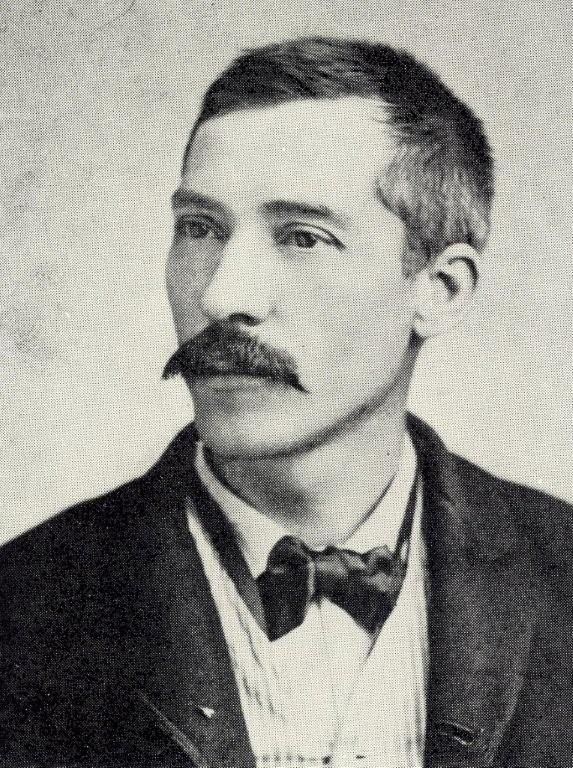
Andrew Jackson Poe

Andrew Jackson Poe (March 2, 1851 – November 11, 1920) was an American landscape artist. His work is representative of a type of folk art known as almshouse or poorhouse painting.

== Early life ==
Andrew Jackson Poe was born on March 2, 1851, in Georgetown, Beaver County, Pennsylvania. He was the sixth of eleven children born to Adam W. Poe, a steamboat captain, and Lucy Todd Poe. He was a great-grandson of Adam Poe, who along with his brother Andrew was well known for fighting Native American raiders. He was also the second cousin, through Adam Poe, of general Orlando Metcalfe Poe.

== Career ==
Poe was not known to have married or had children. He traveled fairly extensively, paying for food and lodgings with his paintings. From 1892 to 1893, he lived in St. Louis, Missouri. Family lore held that his decorative painting adorns portions of the Union Station in St. Louis.

Little is known of his adult life other than the fact that around the turn of the century, when he was in his early 50s, he entered the Beaver County Home, a poorhouse for the destitute, alcoholics and other indigents. There he was befriended by the home's administrator, John Wesley Nippert. Nippert used his own money to buy Poe paints, canvases and other art supplies.

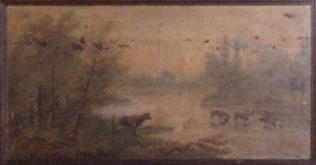
A mural of this painting is/was in the St. Louis, MO train station.

Although Poe painted the occasional still life, his primary focus was on landscapes. His work usually depicted scenes of Beaver County, Pennsylvania, and the adjoining Columbiana County, Ohio. He occasionally noted his artistic debt to other, better-known painters by signing his own name and date in addition to the name of the artist he was copying. Several of his pieces bear the names of German-born western Pennsylvania artist Emil Bott and H. Fisher, who may have been either calendar artist Hugh Fisher or his son, famed illustrator Harrison Fisher. All of his existing pieces are dated between 1905 and 1907.

== Death and legacy ==
Poe died November 11, 1920, in Beaver County while residing at the poorhouse. He was mentally ill when he died. He is buried in the Georgetown, Pennsylvania, cemetery.

By or upon Poe's death on November 11, 1920, about forty Poe paintings, mostly oils, were in Nippert's possession.
