= Orlando Metcalfe Poe =

American general and civil engineer (1832–1895)

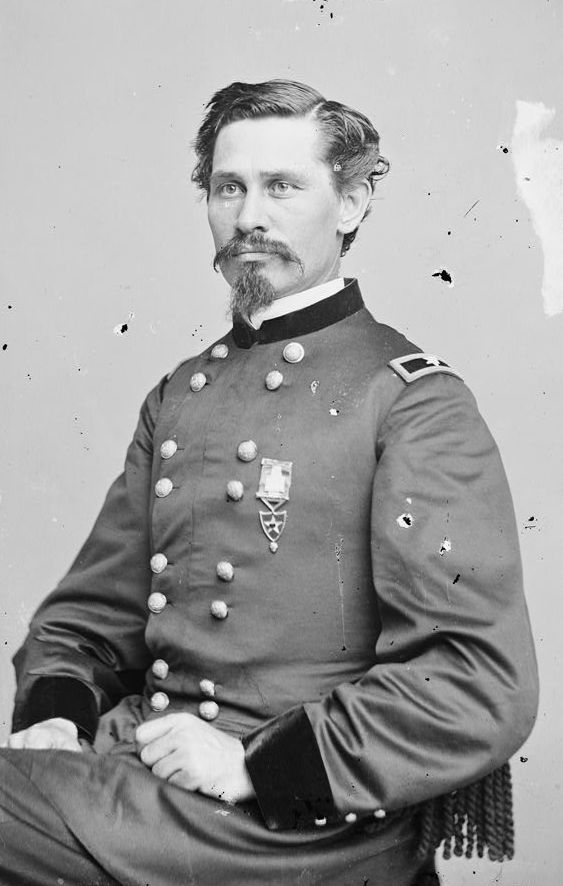
- Orlando M. Poe, taken at the end of the Civil War.
- Born: March 7, 1832; Navarre, Ohio, U.S.
- Died: October 2, 1895 (aged 63); Detroit, Michigan, U.S.
- Burial place: Arlington National Cemetery
- Military career
- Allegiance: United States of America; Union
- Branch: United States Army; Union Army
- Service years: 1856 - 1895
- Rank: Brigadier General
- Commands: 2nd Michigan Infantry Regiment
- Conflicts: American Civil War

Orlando Metcalfe Poe (March 7, 1832 – October 2, 1895) was a United States Army officer and engineer in the American Civil War. After helping General William Tecumseh Sherman's March to the Sea, he was responsible for much of the early lighthouse construction on the Great Lakes and design of the Poe Lock at Soo Locks between lakes Superior and Huron.

== Early life and ancestry ==
Poe was born in Navarre, Ohio. His parents were Charles Poe and Susannah Warner, and he was the first of their five children. He attended the United States Military Academy, graduating sixth in his class in 1856. From then until 1861 he served as an assistant topographical engineer on the survey of the northern Great Lakes; during this time he was promoted to first lieutenant.

Poe's great-great-grandparents were Catherine and George Jacob Pfau. They were of Palatine German descent, and their sons were the first to Anglicize their surname to Poe following the American Revolutionary War. The Pfau family migrated to Ohio from Maryland near modern-day Camp David, where George and Catherine Pfau had originally settled. Pfau's sons Adam and Andrew were noted for their skirmishes with Native Americans in southern Beaver County, Ohio. Both men were known as fearless fighters. The first Adam Poe is reputed to have slain the Wyandot Indian Chief Bigfoot in 1781. The brothers’ exploits were detailed in volume II of Theodore Roosevelt’s book, The Winning of the West.

Poe was a second cousin of the painter Andrew Jackson Poe. He also had English heritage from Metcalfe ancestors.

== Civil War service ==
At the start of the American Civil War, Poe assisted in organizing the volunteers from Ohio; later, he was made a member of Major General George B. McClellan's staff in western Virginia and took part in the Battle of Rich Mountain. He went with McClellan to Washington and assisted by organizing the defense of the capital. Promoted to colonel of volunteers that September, he was placed in command of the 2nd Michigan Infantry Regiment. He commanded them successfully from Yorktown through the Battle of Seven Pines during the Peninsula campaign; he next was given field command of a brigade prior to the Northern Virginia campaign of 1862. His brigade anchored the far right of the Union line at the Second Battle of Bull Run but was only lightly engaged. Several days later on September 1, Poe and his men participated in the Battle of Chantilly. His brigade was present but not active during the December 1862 Battle of Fredericksburg.

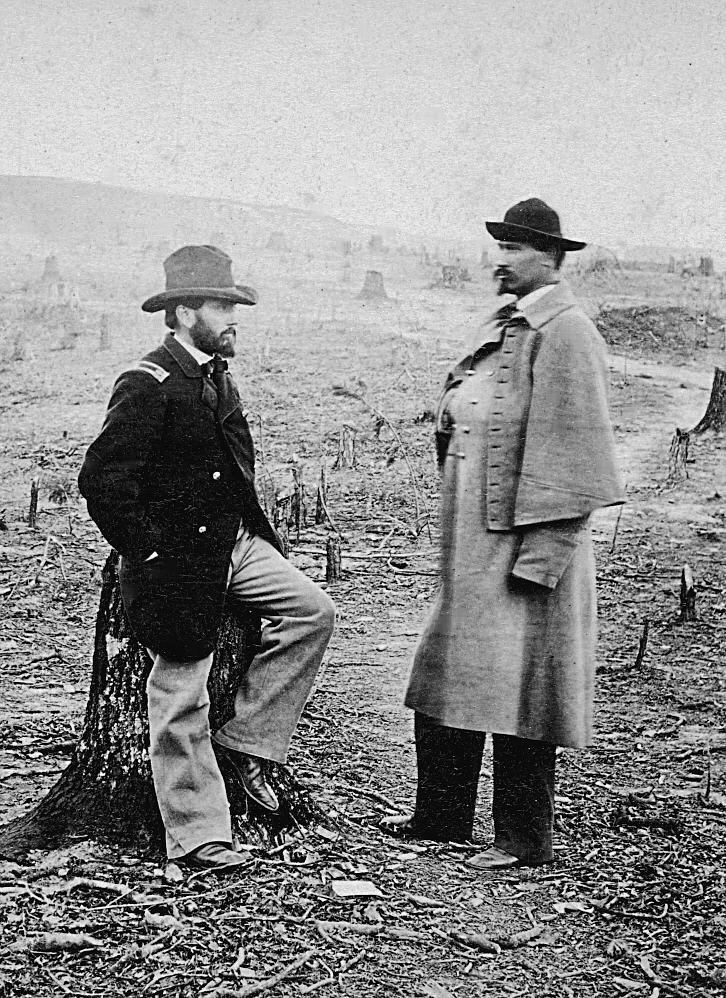
Orville E. Babcock and Poe at Fort Sanders in Knoxville, Tennessee

Poe was appointed brigadier general of volunteers effective November 29, 1862; however, the appointment was rejected by Congress in the spring of 1863. Poe reverted to his old rank of lieutenant in the regular army but was soon promoted to captain and then transferred to the Western theater. In his capacity as chief engineer of the XXIII Corps, he was a key factor in the defense of a siege on Knoxville, Tennessee, led by General James Longstreet, which culminated in the November 29, 1863, Battle of Fort Sanders. Because of Poe's contributions, Major General William T. Sherman selected Poe as his chief engineer in 1864.

=== Sherman's chief engineer ===
As chief engineer, Poe oversaw the burning of Atlanta, for which action he was honored by Sherman. Poe directly supervised the dismantling of all buildings and structures in Atlanta that could have provided any military value to the Rebels once Sherman abandoned the city; rail depots, roundhouses, arsenals and storage areas were manually disassembled and the combustible materials then destroyed by controlled fires (however, Poe was incensed at the level of uncontrolled unsanctioned arson by marauding soldiers not of his unit which resulted in heavy damage to civilian homes.)

Poe continued to serve as chief engineer during Sherman's March to the Sea. Poe was indispensable (by the commanding general's own words) during the march, when Sherman cut loose from his supply lines headed southeast across the body of Georgia to Savannah, living off the land, to bring fire and pillage to the center of the Confederacy. Dozens of river crossings, poor or non-existent roads and the extensive swamps of southern Georgia would have fatally slowed Sherman's force had not Poe's skills as leader of the bridge, road and pontoon building units kept the army moving. He also continued to supervise destruction of Confederate infrastructure.

Breveted to colonel after the fall of Savannah, Poe continued as Sherman's chief engineer in the war's concluding Carolinas campaign as Sherman headed northwards from Savannah to link up with Grant and the Army of the Potomac in Virginia and to cut another swath through South and North Carolina. When the war ended Poe was breveted to brigadier general in the regular army.

== Postbellum career ==
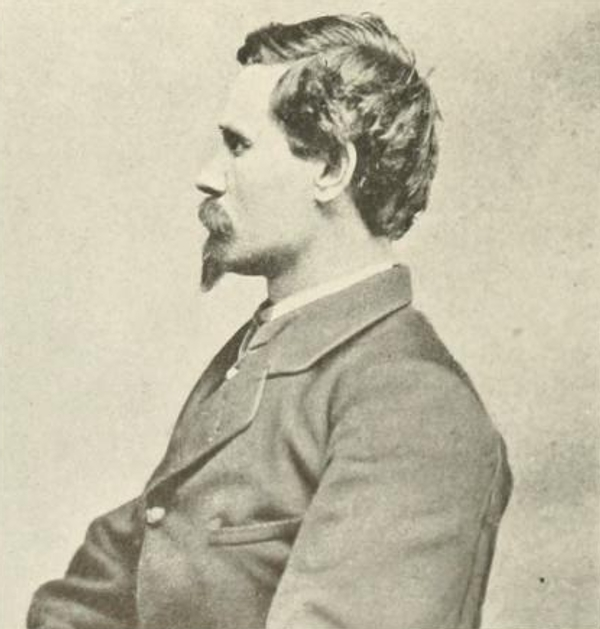
Orlando Poe

In summer 1865 Poe became the Lighthouse Board's chief engineer; in 1870 he was promoted to the position of Chief Engineer of the Upper Great Lakes 11th Lighthouse District. In this capacity, he designed eight "Poe style lighthouses" and oversaw construction of several. Those lights are New Presque Isle Light (1870) on Lake Huron; Lake Michigan's South Manitou Island Light (1872); Grosse Point Light (1873) in Evanston, Illinois; Lake Superior's Au Sable Light (1874); Racine, Wisconsin's Wind Point Light (1880); Outer Island Light (1874) in the Apostle Islands; Little Sable Point Light (1874) on Lake Michigan; Seul Choix Light (1895) in Manistique, Michigan; and Spectacle Reef Light on Lake Huron.

As superintending engineer, he designed a unique lighthouse—in terms of location, construction materials, methods, hardships and costs—at the Spectacle Reef Light on Lake Huron. That light has been described as "the best specimen of monolithic stone masonry in the United States", and "one of the greatest engineering feats on the Great Lakes." Poe solved the logistics problem of building a lighthouse on the remote Stannard Rock in Lake Superior with the proposal to use all the costly apparatus and machinery used to build the Spectacle Reef Light. The exposed crib of the Stannard Rock Light is rated in the top ten engineering feats in the United States. Many of these lights were of Italianate architecture.

From 1873 through 1883 Poe served as engineering aide-de-camp on the staff of Sherman, who had been promoted to commanding general of the U.S. Army. In 1883 he was made superintending engineer of improvement of rivers and harbors on Lake Superior and Lake Huron, where he helped to develop the St. Marys Falls Canal. Many consider his crowning achievement to be the design and implementation of the first Poe Lock in the American Soo Locks in Sault Ste. Marie, as it was instrumental in making possible the shipping industry, including steel craft freighters, in the upper Great Lakes. Consequently, it was pivotal to the creation of the steel industry in the United States. Poe's creation was dismantled in the early 1960s with a larger, more modern lock being built on the same site. This new passageway was renamed the Poe Lock and serves the largest of the Great Lakes freighters to this day.

== Death and legacy ==
Poe died in Detroit on October 2, 1895, of an infection following an on-duty accident at the "Soo Locks," and was buried at Arlington National Cemetery. Poe Reef and the Poe Reef Light in Lake Huron bear his name.

== See also ==
- History of the modern steel industry
- List of American Civil War generals (Union)
