= Wilford B. Poe =

American engineer

Wilford Poe
- Born: 1937 (age 88–89)
- Education: University of Florida
- Known for: Serving as Vice-President for the Space Systems Group

Wilford B. Poe (born 1937) was the vice-president of operations for Honeywell's Space Systems Group. He focuses on attitude control systems for Space Station Freedom, flight control systems for the Space Shuttle and guidance systems for the Atlas Centaur and Titan 4 launch vehicles.
