= Gina R. Poe =

American neuroscientist

- Education: Stanford University; University of California, Los Angeles; University of Arizona
- Known for: Role of REM sleep in memory
- Scientific career
- Fields: Neuroscience
- Workplaces: University of California, Los Angeles
- Thesis: Imaged hippocampal activity during sleep/waking states and spontaneous respiratory events in the freely behaving cat (1995)

Gina R. Poe is an American neuroscientist specializing in the study of sleep and its effect on memory and learning. Her findings have shown that the absence of noradrenaline and low levels of serotonin during sleep spindles allow the brain to form new memories during REM, as well as restructure old memory circuits to allow for more learning during later waking periods. She currently works as a professor at the University of California, Los Angeles (UCLA).

== Early life and education ==
Poe grew up in southern California and received her undergraduate degree in Human Biology at Stanford University. After graduating in 1987, Poe spent two years at the Department of Veterans Affairs studying the brain waves of pilots during high-G maneuvers.

Poe began working on her PhD in neuroscience at UCLA under the guidance of Ronald Harper. Her thesis concerned the neural mechanisms underlying sleep state in cats.

Poe completed her graduate training in 1995. She then pursued her postdoctoral work at the University of Arizona (UA), under the mentorship of Carol Barnes. Studying the importance of sleep in memory consolidation through recording the firing of neurons during familiar experiences, novel experiences, and during sleep, she concluded that circuits encoding recent memories are likely restructured during REM sleep to selectively strengthen new memories and weaken older ones. She also helped pioneer novel approaches to recording brain activity using coherent fiber optic imaging systems.

At UA, Poe collaborated with Bruce McNaughton and Jim Knierim to research the effects of weightlessness in space on hippocampal maps of the environment. In 1998, they recorded ensembles of place cells in rats using multielectrode arrays and assessed whether weightlessness disrupted the ability of place cells to create cortical maps.

== Career and research ==
In 1998, Poe was recruited to Washington State University, joining the faculty as an assistant professor of Veterinary and Comparative Anatomy and an assistant professor of Pharmacology and Physiology. In 2001, Poe was recruited to the University of Michigan Anesthesiology Department. She became an assistant professor of Molecular and Integrative Physiology, as well as an assistant professor of anesthesiology.

While at the University of Michigan, Poe taught both graduate and undergraduate courses and served on the Sleep Research Society's board of directors. In 2016, Poe returned to UCLA to become a Full Professor in the Department of Integrative Biology and Physiology.

Poe is the principal investigator of the Poe Lab, and her research program has been focused on exploring the mechanisms by which the neural mechanisms of sleep support learning and memory. They research how neural patterns underlying learning are reactivated during sleep, to determine how sleep influences the encoding of memories. Her work has shown that sleep is critical for the synaptic-weakening component of memory consolidation, in which memories of lower importance are pruned. Her lab currently researches the importance of sleep-dependent memory consolidation in the memory effects of diseases (such as Alzheimer's disease, schizophrenia, and post traumatic stress disorder).

=== Study of sleep and memory consolidation ===
In 2005, Poe found that rapid eye movement (REM) sleep is important for complex associative learning in rats. After depriving rats of REM sleep for four hours, their improvement at a given task was delayed. Poe then examined the biological underpinnings of the observed theta peaks and troughs during REM sleep. She found that a shift in theta rhythms might occur due to potentiation of distal dendritic synapses and depotentiation of proximal dendritic synapses over learning.

Continuing to research the effects of decreased REM sleep on memory and cognitive performance, Poe assessed how rats' performance in water mazes was affected when non-REM sleep was left intact, but REM sleep was disrupted. They found that REM sleep is not essential for spatial learning, and that when REM sleep was disrupted during initial learning, reversal learning—the ability to disregard old information due to a change in the maze—was enhanced. This suggests that REM may help consolidate incompletely learned items.

Since it is known that antidepressants affect learning and memory, and also inhibit REM sleep, Poe and her colleagues researched the biological underpinnings of how antidepressant-caused inhibition of REM sleep impacts maze learning in rats. Norepinephrine reuptake inhibition, an effect of SNRIs (a class of antidepressant), reduced the length of the transition to REM sleep. This led to worsened re-consolidation of maze memory, as well as an impairment of novel maze learning. Overall, their findings suggested a new model for the purpose of each phase of REM sleep: re-consolidation occurs during REM, novel information is incorporated and consolidated during the transition to REM, and procedural learning is augmented during slow-wave sleep.

During her PhD studies at UCLA, Poe and her colleagues were the first to measure the reflective properties of subcortical neurons in freely moving animals using fiber optic probes, which can be used as an indirect measurement of neural activity with high temporal resolution. Using this tool, they measured the activity of the hippocampus during sleep and wake states in cats. They found that the dorsal hippocampus increased activity during REM sleep, whereas neocortical brain regions decreased their activity.

=== Advocacy ===
Poe serves as the Director of Diversity in Outreach and Education Programs at UCLA. She is also the co-faculty director of the Maximizing Access to Research Careers (MARC) Program. In this role, she helps underrepresented students use STEM resources on campus and increase their academic retention, while encouraging them to pursue graduate school.

Poe is a member of the Society for Neuroscience Professional Development Committee, which aims to "further the professional development of neuroscientists" with an emphasis on diversity. Poe also co-directs the Neuroscience Scholars Program through the Society for Neuroscience; admission to the program is restricted to underrepresented students. Poe organizes and teaches the Summer Program in Neuroscience Excellence and Success (SPINES) courses, which aims to help underrepresented students.

== Select publications ==
- Swift, KM; Keus, K; Echeverria, CG; Cabrera, Y; Jimenez, J; Holloway, J; Clawson, BC; Poe, GR (2020). "Sex differences within sleep in gonadally intact rats". Sleep. 43 (5) zsz289. doi:10.1093/sleep/zsz289. PMC 7215272. PMID 31784755.
- Swift, KM; Gross, BA; Frazer, MA; Bauer, DS; Clark, KJD; Vazey, EM; Aston-Jones, G; Li, Y; Pickering, AE; Sara, SJ; Poe, GR (2018). "Abnormal Locus Coeruleus Sleep Activity Alters Sleep Signatures of Memory Consolidation and Impairs Place Cell Stability and Spatial Memory". Curr Biol. 28 (22): 3599–3609.e4. Bibcode:2018CBio...28E3599S. doi:10.1016/j.cub.2018.09.054. PMC 7556718. PMID 30393040.
- Emrick, JJ; Gross, BA; Riley, BT; Poe, GR (2016). "Different Simultaneous Sleep States in the Hippocampus and Neocortex". Sleep. 39 (12): 2201–2209. doi:10.5665/sleep.6326. PMC 5103808. PMID 27748240.
- Watts, A; Gritton, HJ; Sweigart, J; Poe, GR (2012). "Antidepressant suppression of non-REM sleep spindles and REM sleep impairs hippocampus-dependent learning while augmenting striatum-dependent learning". J Neurosci. 32 (39): 13411–20. doi:10.1523/JNEUROSCI.0170-12.2012. PMC 3712834. PMID 23015432.
