= Neilson Poe =

American politician

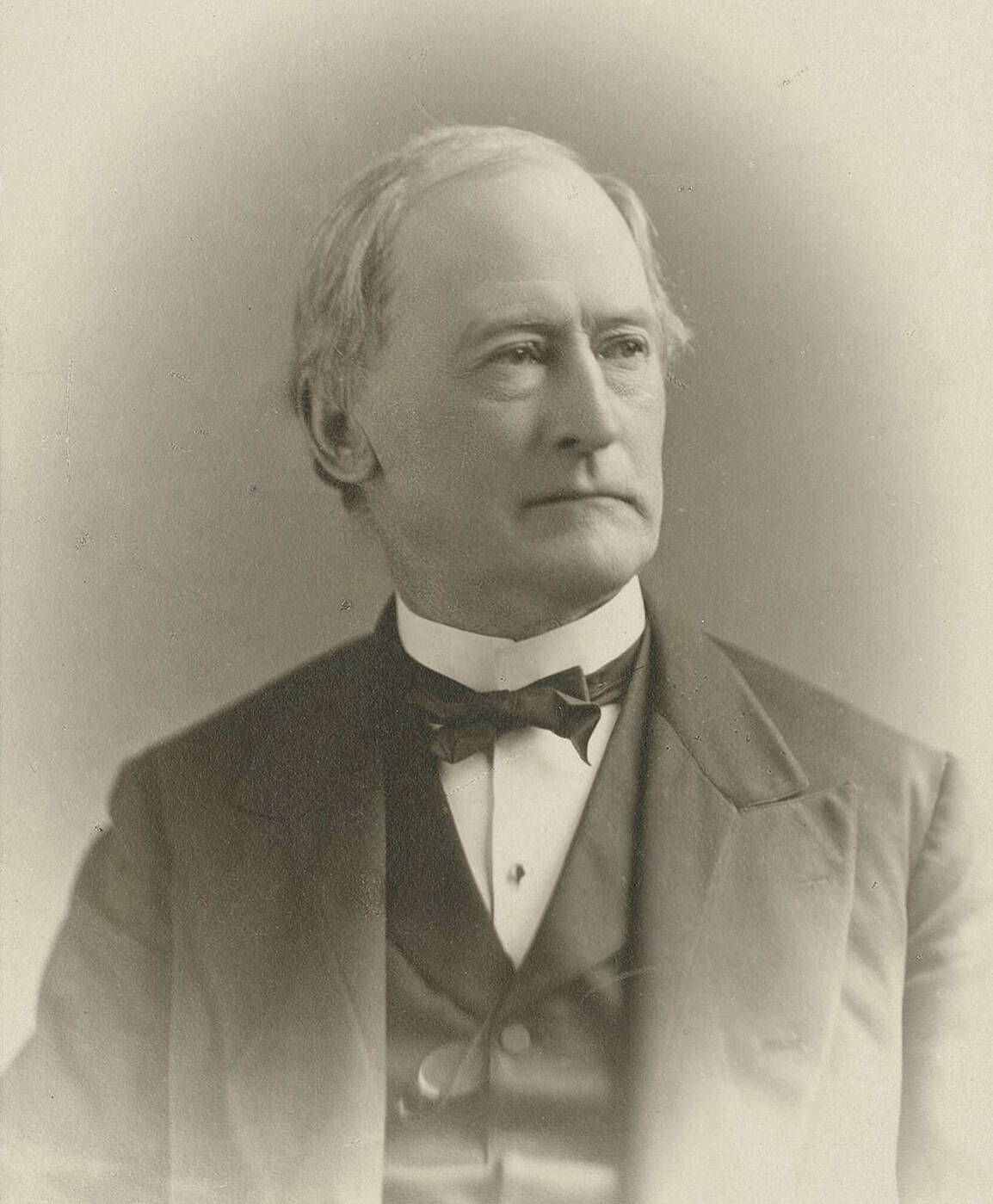
- Born: 11 August 1809; Baltimore
- Died: 4 January 1884 (aged 74); Baltimore
- Children: John Prentiss Poe
- Parent(s): Jacob Poe

Neilson Poe (August 11, 1809 – January 4, 1884) was an American judge for the City of Baltimore's orphan's court, (now referred to as a probate court). He was initially appointed to the court by Maryland Governor John Lee Carroll in 1878 and elected to the position in November 1879. He had the job until 1883.

He also worked as the director of the Chesapeake and Ohio Canal, as well as a state director for the Baltimore and Ohio Railroad. He was also an editor for several newspapers, such as the Frederick Examiner, the Federal Gazette and the Baltimore Chronicle, for which he was also the proprietor.

Neilson was a cousin of the poet, Edgar Allan Poe. His wife, Josephine E. Clemm was a half-sister of the poet's wife, Virginia Eliza Clemm Poe. In a letter to mutual acquaintance Joseph Snodgrass, Edgar referred to his cousin Neilson: "I believe him to be the bitterest enemy I have in the world. He is the more despicable in this, since he makes loud professions of friendship."

On October 3, 1849, Edgar Allan Poe was found semiconscious at Ryan's Inn and Tavern. Neilson attempted to visit Edgar in the hospital and subsequently wrote several letters containing information about his cousin's death. Soon afterwards Edgar died. Edgar's hearse and headstone of white Italian marble were paid for by Neilson.

Poe was the father of John Prentiss Poe, the Attorney General of Maryland from 1891 until 1895. His grandsons included the six Poe brothers, who played college football at Princeton University between 1882 and 1901. Poe died on January 3, 1884, in Baltimore.

== See also ==
- Death of Edgar Allan Poe
