= Neilson Poe (American football) =

American football player and coach (1876–1963)

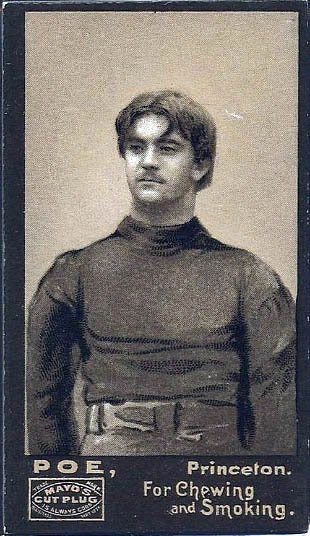
- Poe displayed on a 1894 Mayo's Cut Plug American football card

Biographical details
- Born: October 1, 1876; Baltimore, Maryland, U.S.
- Died: September 22, 1963 (aged 86); Baltimore, Maryland, U.S.

Playing career
- 1895–1896: Princeton
- Position: Halfback

Coaching career (HC unless noted)
- 1897: Wesleyan
- 1898: Princeton
- 1899: Illinois (assistant)
- 1901–1902: Navy (assistant)
- 1904–1942: Princeton (freshmen)
- Military career
- Allegiance: United States
- Branch: U.S. Army
- Service years: 1917–1918
- Rank: Lieutenant
- Unit: 93rd Infantry Division
- Conflicts: World War I Second Battle of the Marne
- Awards: Distinguished Service Cross; French War Cross

Neilson "Net" Poe (October 1, 1876 – September 22, 1963) was an American college football player and coach. He played as a falfback at Princeton University 1895 and 1896, and later returned to coach at the school. He was one of the Poe brothers, six siblings who were celebrated players for the Princeton Tigers between 1882 and 1901. Neilson graduated from Princeton in 1897.

Poe coached football at Wesleyan University in 1897, leading his team to a Little Three championship. The next year, returned to Princeton to coach the football team. In 1899, Poe assisted George Huff in coaching the football team at University of Illinois. From 1901 to 1902, he was an assistant football coach the United States Naval Academy. Poe returned to his alma mater once more in 1904 to coach the freshmen football team. He remained Princeton's freshmen football coach through 1942.

During World War I, Neilson served in the United States Army infantry as a lieutenant. In 1917, at the age of 41, he reported for officers training, located in Plattsburgh, New York. In 1918, Neilson took part in the Second Battle of the Marne, during which his commanding officer was killed. During the battle he was wounded, but still took command of his fellow soldiers and safely entrenched them for 24 hours. He suffered a bullet wound to the stomach and several shrapnel wounds. He spent the rest of the war hospitalized and was later awarded the French War Cross and the Distinguished Service Cross.

After the war, he returned to Princeton to serve as an assistant coach from 1919 until his death in 1963. He resided during those years in the Nassau Inn, room 24.

Poe died on September 22, 1963, at the Loch Raven Veterans Administration Hospital in Baltimore.
