= Leonard Poe =

English physician

- Born: 1590
- Died: 4 April 1631 (aged 40–41)
- Occupation: Physician

Leonard Poe (1590 – 4 April 1631) was an English physician.

== Biography ==
Poe whose family came originally, it is said, from the Rhenish Palatinate, was in 1590 in the service of the Earl of Essex. Essex, after many vain appeals to the College of Physicians, secured from that body on 13 July 1596 a license enabling Poe to practise medicine (Hist. MSS. Comm. 8th Rep. pt. i. p. 228). Although he was thereby permitted to treat venereal, cutaneous, and calculous diseases, gout and simple tertian ague, in all other fevers and in all severe diseases he was required to call to his assistance a member of the college (Munk, College of Physicians, i. 149). On 30 June 1598 he was ordered to be imprisoned and deprived of his license, but soon made terms with the college. Despite the suspicion with which the profession regarded him, his practice was large in fashionable society, and his reputation stood fairly high. On 11 December 1606, at the suggestion of the Earls of Southampton, Northampton, and Salisbury, all restrictions on his license were removed. On 12 January 1609 he was made ordinary physician of the king's household (State Papers, Dom. index to warrant book, p. 77), and on 7 July the persistent influence of his aristocratic patrons led to his election as fellow of the College of Physicians (Hist. MS. Comm. ubi supra). He had a mandate on 22 July 1615 to be created M.D., and apparently obtained the degree at Cambridge.

In April 1612 he was one of the three physicians in attendance on Lord-treasurer Salisbury (State Papers, Dom. James I, lxviii. 104), and was present at his death on 24 May following (Hist. MSS. Comm. 10th Rep. part iv. p. 16). On 6 June 1625 he attended the death of Orlando Gibbons, the musical composer, and made the post-mortem (ib. Car. I, iii. 37). He died on 4 April 1631, when Sir Edward Alston was elected a fellow in his place. His son Theophilus matriculated from Broadgate Hall, Oxford, 1623–4, 6 Feb., æt. 15.
