= John Prentiss Poe =

Attorney General of the State of Maryland from 1891 to 1895

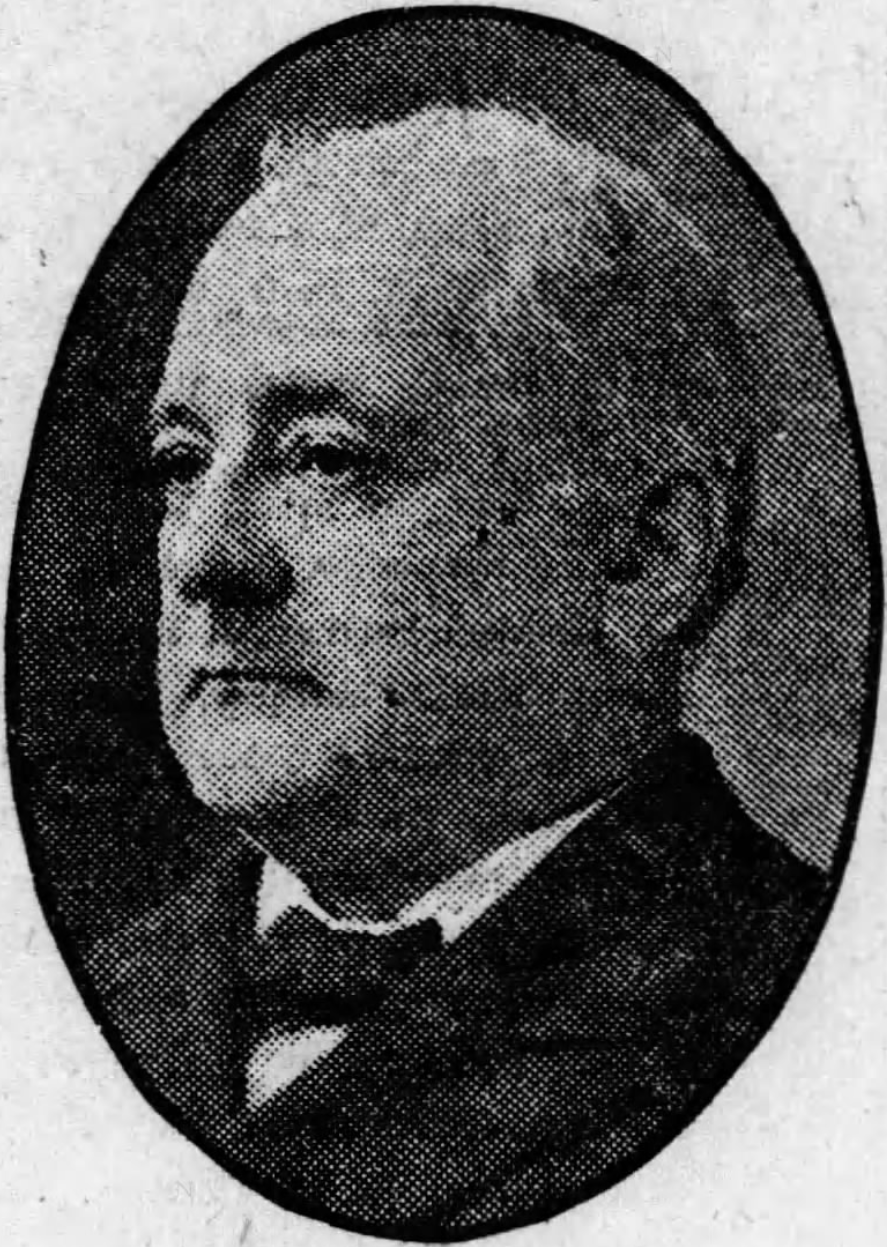
- Poe in 1909 newspaper

Attorney General of Maryland
- In office 1891–1895
- Governor: Elihu Emory Jackson; Frank Brown
- Preceded by: William Pinkney Whyte
- Succeeded by: Harry M. Clabaugh

Member of the Maryland Senate from the 2nd district
- In office 1890–1891
- Preceded by: C. Ridgely Goodwin
- Succeeded by: James P. Gorter

Personal details
- Born: August 22, 1836 Baltimore, Maryland, U.S.
- Died: October 14, 1909 (aged 73) Baltimore County, Maryland, U.S.
- Resting place: Green Mount Cemetery; Baltimore, Maryland, U.S.
- Party: Democratic
- Spouse: Anne Johnson Hough (m. 1863)
- Relations: Edgar Allan Poe (cousin)
- Children: 9, including Edgar A., Johnny, Art and Gresham
- Education: Mount St. Mary's University
- Alma mater: College of New Jersey (AB)
- Profession: Law; Dean of University of Maryland School of Law

John Prentiss Poe (August 22, 1836 – October 14, 1909) was Attorney General of the State of Maryland from 1891 to 1895. He also served in the Maryland Senate from 1890 to 1891.

== Early life ==
John Prentiss Poe was born on August 22, 1836, in Baltimore, to Josephine Emily (née Clemm) and Neilson Poe. Poe was a second cousin of the poet Edgar Allan Poe as well as a nephew through his mother.

Poe grew up in Elmwood and Baltimore. He attended Monsieur Boursand's French and English Academy, Mount St. Mary's University and Topping's Academy. He graduated from College of New Jersey (later Princeton University) in 1854 with a Bachelor of Arts. After graduating, he started studying law under his father and was admitted to the bar on August 22, 1857.

== Career ==
On July 24, 1854, Poe started work as a clerk of the Commercial & Farmers' Bank. He was librarian of the Library of the Baltimore Bar for sixteen months. As a lawyer, Poe was known for his work in trial courts and as a cross-examiner. He would later practice with his sons in the law firm John P. Poe & Sons.

In 1869, Poe was chosen as a regent of the board of the University of Maryland. He held that role for forty years, and served as secretary of the board for a time. He served as Dean of the University of Maryland School of Law from 1871 until his death in 1909. Between February 1871 and February 1888, Poe served as one of the commissioners of public schools for Baltimore. In 1885, he was chairman of the Baltimore Tax Commission and in 1886 he was chairman of the Maryland Tax Commission. In 1899, Poe was president of the State Bar Association and in 1900, he was president of the Bar Association in Baltimore.

From 1882 to 1884, Poe served as city counselor and from 1890 to 1891, he served in the Maryland Senate, representing District 2, Baltimore City. From 1891 to 1895, he served as Attorney General of Maryland. He was a Democrat. He was a delegate to the 1904 Democratic National Convention. In 1907, Poe was a Democratic candidate for the United States Senate. In 1883, Poe compiled a new Baltimore City Code and in 1885, he compiled a supplement to the Baltimore Code of City Ordinances.

In 1888, Poe helped compile the "Poe Code", a compilation of public general laws in Maryland. In 1898 and 1900, he compiled supplements of the public general laws and a new code of public general laws, respectively. In 1904, after the Great Baltimore Fire destroyed the new code of 1903, he wrote a new code. His name is lent to the 1904 "Poe Amendment" that sought to disenfranchise black voters in Maryland by introducing grandfather and "understanding" clauses. Black voters organized the Negro Suffrage League and established chapters throughout the state in order to marshal opposition to the amendment. Maryland voters soundly defeated the Poe Amendment by plebiscite. While Poe was sympathetic and contributed to the text of the amendment, it was drafted by Arthur Pue Gorman, chairman of the Maryland Senate Democratic Caucus from 1903 to 1906.

== Personal life ==
Poe married Anne Johnson Hough on March 2, 1863. He had six sons and three daughters, including Marguerita, S. Johnson, Edgar A., John P. Jr., Neilson, Arthur and Gresham. All six sons played football for Princeton. Son Edgar Allan Poe served as state Attorney General from 1911 to 1915. Another son, Johnny Poe coached at Navy and Virginia, and was killed in the Battle of Loos during World War I. Art Poe was selected to the College Football Hall of Fame, and Gresham Poe was head coach at Virginia.

Poe was a member of Old St. Paul's Protestant Episcopal Church. He died of a stroke in Ruxton, Baltimore County, on October 14, 1909, and was buried in Baltimore's Green Mount Cemetery.

== Legacy ==
=== Awards ===
Poe received an honorary Doctor of Laws from Princeton University in 1904.

=== Literary reference ===
In the novel Chesapeake, James A. Michener describes racially-disenfranchising legislation proposed by John Prentiss Pope (sic), "dean of the law school at the university". The author describes a fictitious law, as well as the debate surrounding its motivation and purported merits, using verbiage that parallels the historical Poe Amendment.

Government offices
Preceded by William Pinkney Whyte	Attorney General of Maryland; 1891–1895	Succeeded by Harry M. Clabaugh
