= Isaac Lobe Straus =

American politician and lawyer (1871–1946)

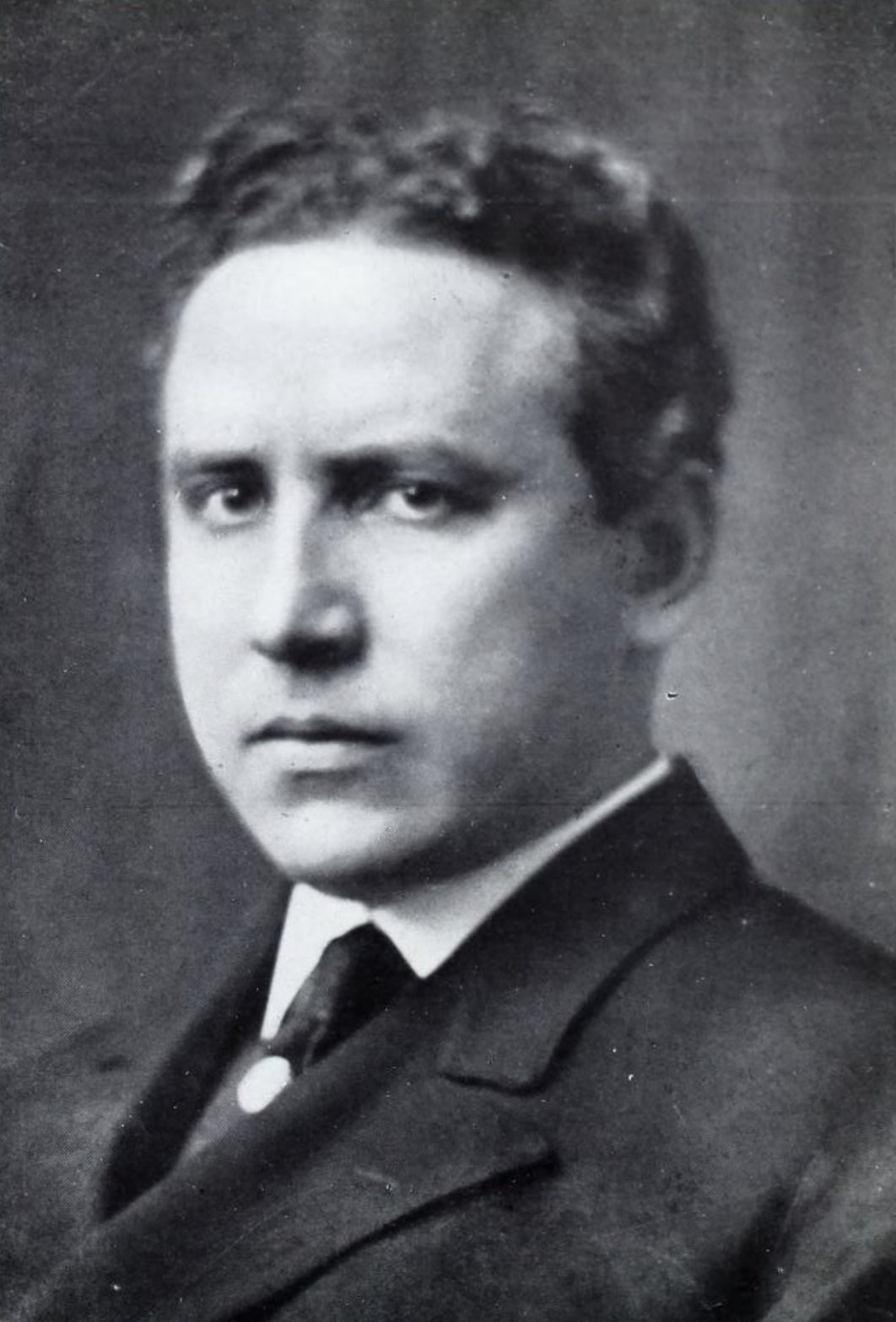
- Straus in 1914 publication

Attorney General of Maryland
- In office 1907–1911
- Governor: Edwin Warfield; Austin Lane Crothers
- Preceded by: William Shepard Bryan Jr.
- Succeeded by: Edgar Allan Poe

Member of the Maryland House of Delegates
- In office 1902

Personal details
- Born: March 24, 1871 Baltimore, Maryland, U.S.
- Died: February 4, 1946 (aged 74) Brooklandville, Maryland, U.S.
- Resting place: Har Sinai Cemetery; Baltimore, Maryland, U.S.
- Party: Democratic
- Spouse: Florence Ridgely
- Education: Baltimore City College
- Alma mater: Johns Hopkins University; University of Maryland School of Law (LLB)
- Occupation: Politician; lawyer

Isaac Lobe Straus (March 24, 1871 – February 4, 1946) was an American politician and lawyer from Maryland. He served in the Maryland House of Delegates in 1902 and as Attorney General of Maryland from 1907 to 1911.

== Early life ==
Isaac Lobe Straus was born on March 24, 1871, in Baltimore, Maryland, to Annette (née Lobe) and William Henry Straus. He attended Baltimore City College and graduated from Johns Hopkins University in 1890. He was Jewish. He graduated from the University of Maryland School of Law in 1892 with a Bachelor of Laws. He was admitted to the bar in June 1892.

== Career ==
Straus served as general counsel to the Board of Supervisors of Elections for Baltimore from 1900 to 1901. He was a member of the burnt district commission following the Great Baltimore Fire. He served as special counsel for the state of Maryland relating to the Baltimore and Ohio Railroad.

Straus was a Democrat. Straus served in the Maryland House of Delegates, representing Baltimore, in 1902. He served as Attorney General of Maryland from 1907 to 1911. He served as a delegate to the 1908 Democratic National Convention. He was an unsuccessful candidate for the United States Senate in 1914.

== Personal life ==
Straus married Florence Ridgely.

Straus died on February 4, 1946, in Brooklandville, Maryland. He was buried at Har Sinai Cemetery in Baltimore.

== See also ==
- List of Jewish American jurists

Legal offices
Preceded by William Shepard Bryan Jr.	Attorney General of Maryland; 1907–1911	Succeeded by Edgar Allan Poe
