= Gresham Poe =

American football player and coach (1880–1956)

Biographical details
- Born: July 30, 1880; Baltimore, Maryland, U.S.
- Died: April 25, 1956 (aged 75); Baltimore, Maryland, U.S.

Playing career
- 1901: Princeton
- Position: Quarterback

Coaching career (HC unless noted)
- 1903: Virginia

Head coaching record
- Overall: 7–2–1
- Military career
- Allegiance: United States
- Branch: U.S. Army
- Service years: 1917–1918
- Rank: Lieutenant
- Conflicts: World War I Western Front

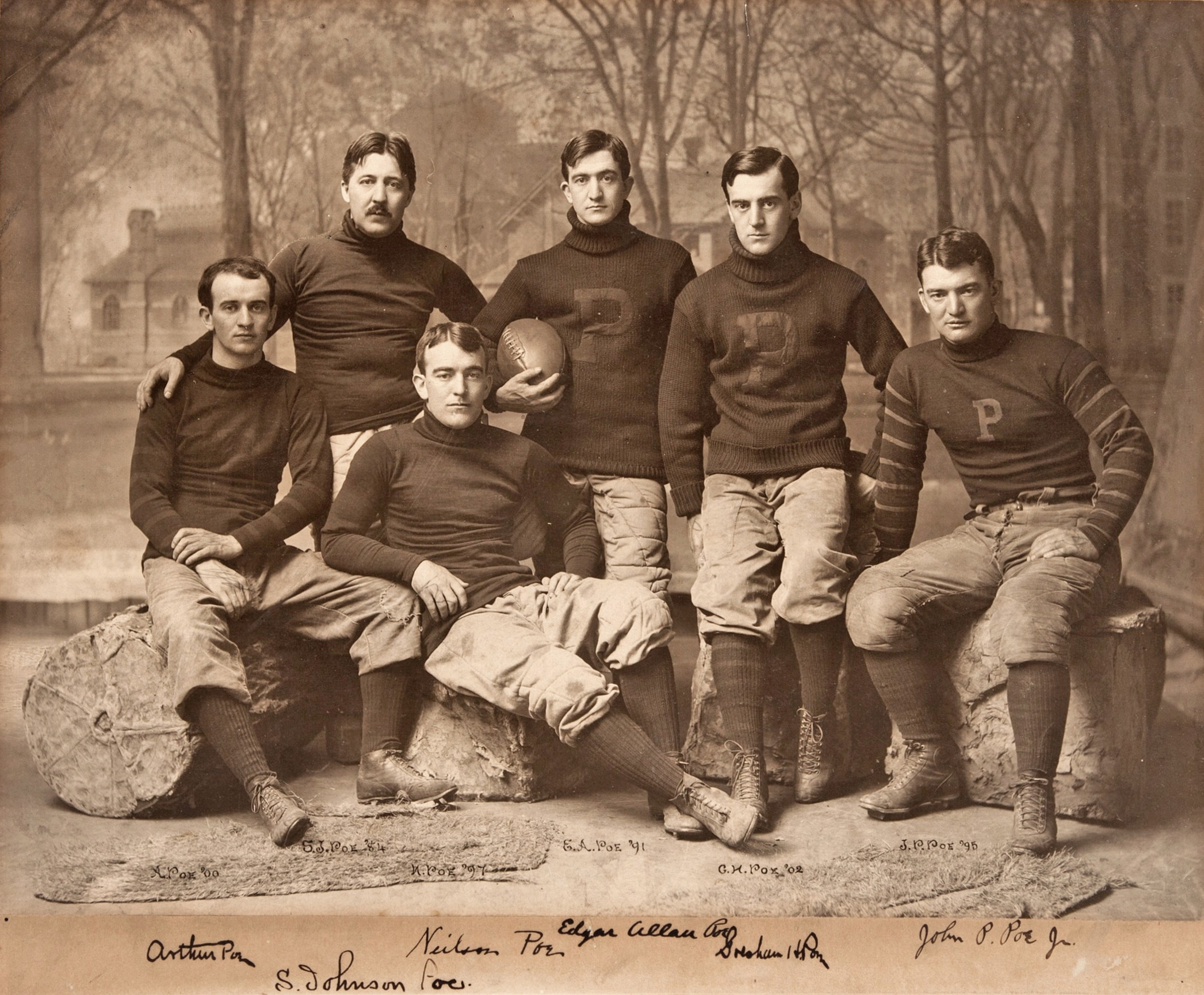
The football-playing Poe brothers of Princeton, with Gresham second from right

Gresham Hough Poe (July 30, 1880 – April 25, 1956) was an American football player and coach. He was the head coach of the University of Virginia football program from 1903 to 1903. Prior to that he played as a substitute quarterback for the Princeton Tigers. He was a member of the Poe brothers, six celebrated football players to play football at Princeton in the late 19th and early 20th century. He, and all of his brothers were also second cousins, twice removed of American author Edgar Allan Poe. Outside of football, Poe was a noted wrestler.

While he did not see much playing time at Princeton, Poe almost managed to rally the Tigers from 12–0 deficit over Yale game, in 1901. Late in the game, Poe came off the bench, received a punt and gained 23 yards. According to Harper's Weekly, "Poe's presence seemed to rejuvenate the Tigers, and for the last 10 minutes of the contest they fairly outplayed the weary Elis. The ball was twice carried half the length of the field, but the whistle blew before Princeton could score." he graduated from Princeton in 1902.

During World War I, he fought in France while serving in the United States Army.

== Head coaching record ==
Year	Team	Overall	Conference	Standing	Bowl/playoffs
Virginia Orange and Blue (Independent) (1903)
1903	Virginia	7–2–1			
Virginia:		7–2–1			
Total:		7–2–1			
