= Edgar Allan Poe (attorney general) =

Attorney General of Maryland from 1911 to 1915

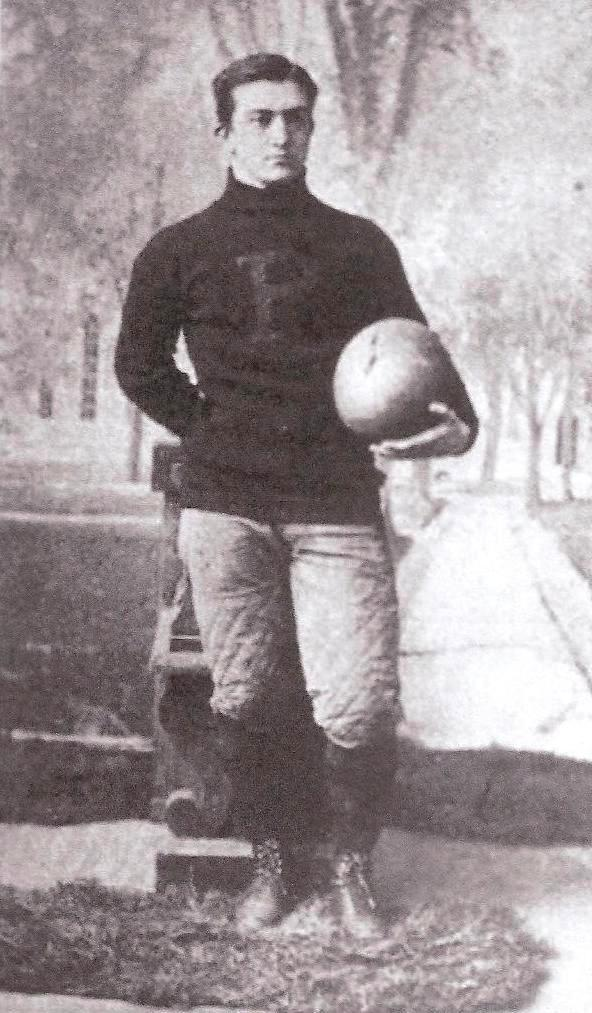
- Portrait of Poe from Walter Camp's 1894 book, American Football

Princeton Tigers
- Position: Quarterback

Personal information
- Born: September 15, 1871; Baltimore, Maryland, U.S.
- Died: November 29, 1961 (aged 90); Chestnut Hill, Pennsylvania, U.S.

Career information
- College: Princeton (1889–1890)

Awards and highlights
- First-team All-American (1889)

Other information

Attorney General of Maryland
- In office 1911–1915
- Governor: Austin Lane Crothers; Phillips Lee Goldsborough
- Preceded by: Isaac Lobe Straus
- Succeeded by: Albert Ritchie

Personal details
- Resting place: St. Thomas Church; Baltimore, Maryland, U.S.
- Party: Democratic
- Spouses: Annie T. McKay (m. 1895; died 1928) Marie L. McIlhenny (m. 1932)
- Children: 1
- Parent: John Prentiss Poe (father)
- Relatives: Edgar Allan Poe (great uncle)
- Education: Princeton University (BA); University of Maryland School of Law (LLB)

Edgar Allan Poe (September 15, 1871 – November 29, 1961) was Attorney General of the State of Maryland from 1911 to 1915. He was born in Baltimore, the son of former Maryland attorney general John Prentiss Poe. He was named for his great-uncle and second cousin, twice removed, author Edgar Allan Poe, who died in 1849.

== Early life and education ==
Edgar Allan Poe was born on September 15, 1871, in Baltimore, Maryland, to Anne Johnson (née Hough) and John Prentiss Poe. He was educated at George G. Carey's private school. Poe was the great-nephew of famous poet Edgar Allan Poe.

Poe attended Princeton University, where he played varsity football. He was the quarterback of the 1889 team, which finished with a perfect 10–0 record. After that season, Poe was named the quarterback of the very first 1889 All-America college football team. After Princeton beat Harvard, 41–15, a Harvard man reportedly asked a Princeton alumnus whether Poe was related to the great Edgar Allan Poe. According to the story, "the alumnus looked at him in astonishment and replied, 'He is the great Edgar Allan Poe.'" He also played men's lacrosse at Princeton and was team captain. Poe was given the title of "one of 'the Poe Brothers of Princeton'" throughout his life due to his football legacy at Princeton.

Poe graduated Phi Beta Kappa in 1891 with a Bachelor of Arts degree. He next attended the University of Maryland School of Law, where he received a Bachelor of Laws degree in 1893.

== Career ==
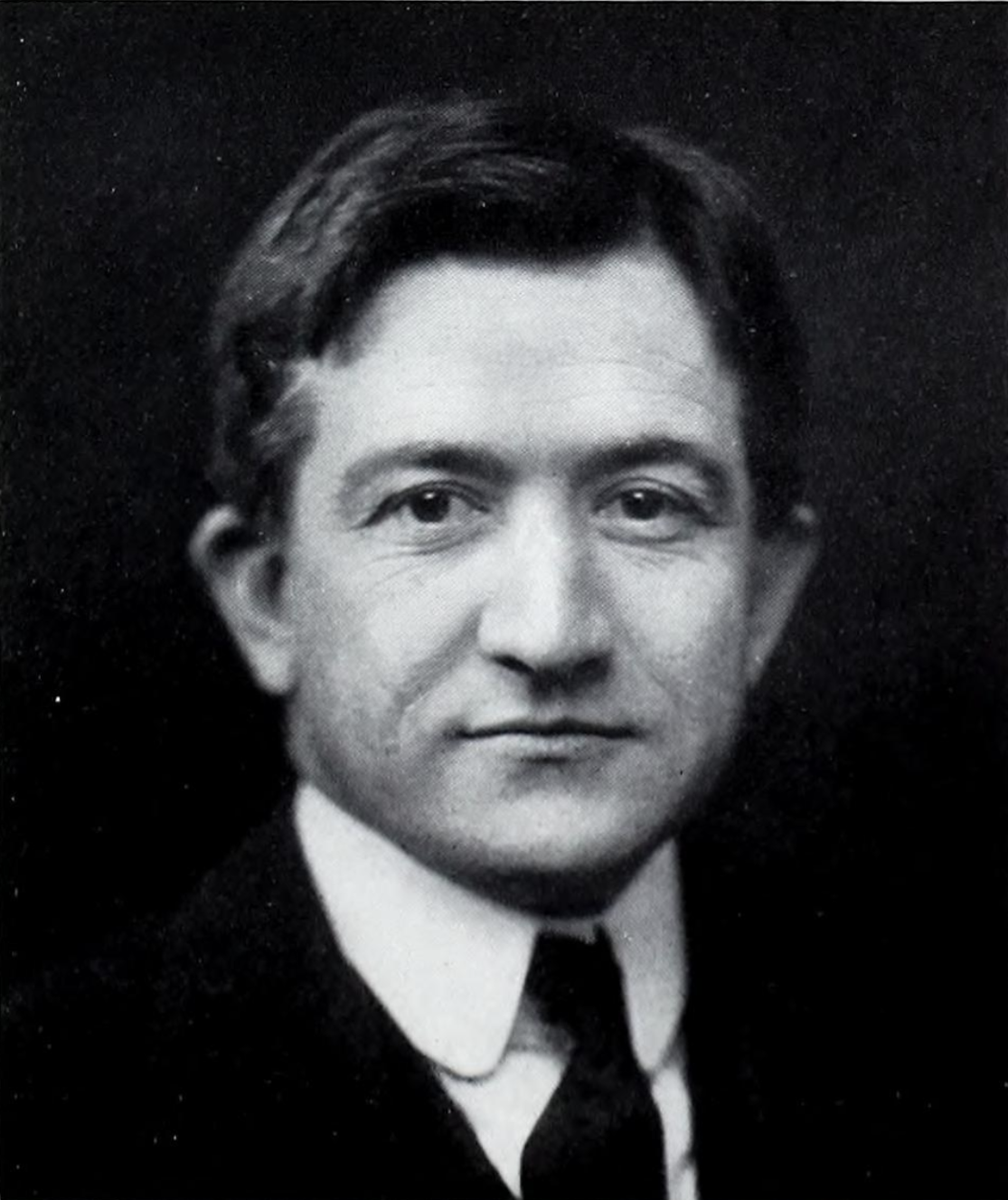
Poe in 1914 publication

After traveling for more than a year in Europe, Poe joined his father and brothers in the family's law firm, John P. Poe & Sons. He was with the law firm from 1895 to 1909. Poe was a lecturer at the University of Baltimore School of Law from 1897 to 1901. He was appointed as the Deputy State's Attorney for Baltimore in 1900, a position he held until 1903. Poe served as state's attorney from 1903 to November 1903. He was a lecturer at the University of Maryland School of Law from 1901 to 1913. He was with the firm Bartlett, Poe, Clagett & Bland in 1911. He also served as deputy city solicitor from 1903 to 1908 and as city solicitor from 1908 to 1911 for Baltimore City before being elected as Attorney General of the State of Maryland, a position he held from 1911 to 1915. As city solicitor, he defended an ordinance that would enshrine segregation between blacks and whites in housing. Poe was a Democrat.

== Personal life ==
In 1895, Poe married Annie T. McKay, and they had a son, Edgar Allan Poe, Jr. His son, who also graduated from Princeton, was severely wounded in World War I while serving as a U.S. Marine Corps second lieutenant in France. His wife died in 1928. In 1932, Poe married Mrs. Marie L. McIlhenny of Philadelphia. The Poe family lived at Stemmer Run in Green Spring Valley in Baltimore.

Poe enjoyed sailing and sailed in Jamestown, Rhode Island. He owned a summer home in Northeast Harbor, Maine. He was an Episcopalian. He was a vestryman at Old St. Paul's Church in Baltimore and later became a vestryman at St. Paul's Episcopal Church in Chestnut Hill, Pennsylvania.

Poe died on November 29, 1961, at his home in Chestnut Hill. He was buried at the church cemetery of St. Thomas Church in Baltimore.

Legal offices
Preceded by Isaac Lobe Straus	Attorney General of Maryland; 1911–1915	Succeeded by Albert Ritchie
