= Deena Clark =

American television news reporter and journalist

Deena Clark (born Ruby Constandina Speliakos; 1913 – 1 August 2003) was an American television news reporter and journalist. She hosted two of her own news shows, The Deena Clark Show on CBS and Deena Clark: A Moment With on NBC. In her career Clark interviewed many notable people, including John F. Kennedy, Lady Bird Johnson, Bob Hope, and others.

== Early life and education ==
Deena Clark, born Ruby Constandina Speliakos, was born in La Jolla, California in 1913. She attended and graduated from San Diego State University. Clark then moved to Hawaii to teach in 1932. On the ship ride to Hawaii, she met Blake Clark, who she would later marry in Honolulu. She moved back to the United States in 1942 with her husband to attend Vanderbilt University for a master's degree in English. Their marriage ended in a divorce in 1973.

== Early career ==
After graduating, Clark traveled to South America and performed an interpretation of traditional Hawaiian hulu with a dance group. She then made another career change and was part of the off-Broadway production Viva O'Brien!. The production was a musical comedy set in Miami, Florida and Yucatán, Mexico. Clark played the role of Senorita. The play ran for 20 performances from October 9–25, 1941. The play was canceled due to poor reviews.

She later modeled for John Robert Powers Modeling Agency during WWII in New York. She modeled both fashions of the times as well as women's military support uniforms. In 1944, Clark worked at the Stage Door Canteen as the secretary to the director.

== Journalism and television career ==
Deena Clark started her journalism career by doing freelance writing. Some of her writings were published in the National Geographic magazine. Her article on La Jolla, "La Jolla, a Gem of the California Coast" (1960), was cited as a source in the registration of the La Jolla Post Office as a historic site.

She began her television career as a guest mediator on Meet the Press, interviewing John F. Kennedy in 1954. She also hosted two of her own shows, Deena Clark: A Moment With… on NBC and The Deena Clark Show on CBS. While working at NBC, she wrote a column in The Diplomat titled "Deena Clark's Social Sparks." On Deena Clark: A Moment With…, Clark interviewed many notable people including Judy Agnew, Bob Hope, and Lady Bird Johnson. On The Deena Clark Show, she interviewed people including Attorney General William B. Saxbe, Secretary of Defense Caspar Weinberger, and White House Chief of Staff and Secretary of the Treasury Donald Regan.

== Later life and death ==
When Clark was 58 years of age, she swam the Corinth Canal, a nearly four mile distance between the Ionian and Aegean seas of southern Greece, the first recorded woman to complete the feat. In 1977 at the age of 64, Clark swam the width of Hellespont in 63 minutes.

Clark retired in the 1980s but was an active member in the Chevy Chase, Sulgrave and National Press clubs, and the Philhellenes Society.

Clark was diagnosed with cancer and later died of sepsis on August 1, 2003 in Sibley Memorial Hospital.

== Selected works ==
- "Mikimoto, the pearl king" (1959)
- "Iceland Tapestry" (1951)
- "Treglown home: A pink penthouse" (1953)
- "Camp's by-product is enjoyment: Camp 'topridge'." (1953)

== Archival resources ==
- Deena Clark papers at the University of Maryland libraries
- Photographs of Attorneys General, 1989 - ca. 1991 at the National Archives and Records Administration
- Deena Clark Show transcripts
  - 141: Deena Clark Show: 3/15/75 at the National Archives and Records Administration
  - White House Communications Agency: Videotape Collection, 1981-85 at the Ronald Reagan Presidential Library and Museum
  - Transcript of Proceedings, Interview of the Honorable William B. Saxbe, Attorney General of the United States, by Deena Clark of "The Deena Clark Show" (WTOP–TV), Washington, D.C. at the United States Department of Justice
- Deena Clark: A Moment With… transcripts
  - [Records of U. Alexis Johnson] 01/09/1973, Taping of Interview w/Deena Clark for "A Moment With." Personal. at the National Archives and Records Administration
  - A Moment With Hubert H. Humphrey, NBC-TV (transcript), February 9 at the Minnesota Historical Society
  - A Moment with Deena Clark. Esther Peterson talks about the President's Commission on the Status of Women (PCSW), and women who are not covered by current legislation. May 4, 1963: Audio file at the Schlesinger Library
