= 1990 Maryland Attorney General election =

- November 6, 1990
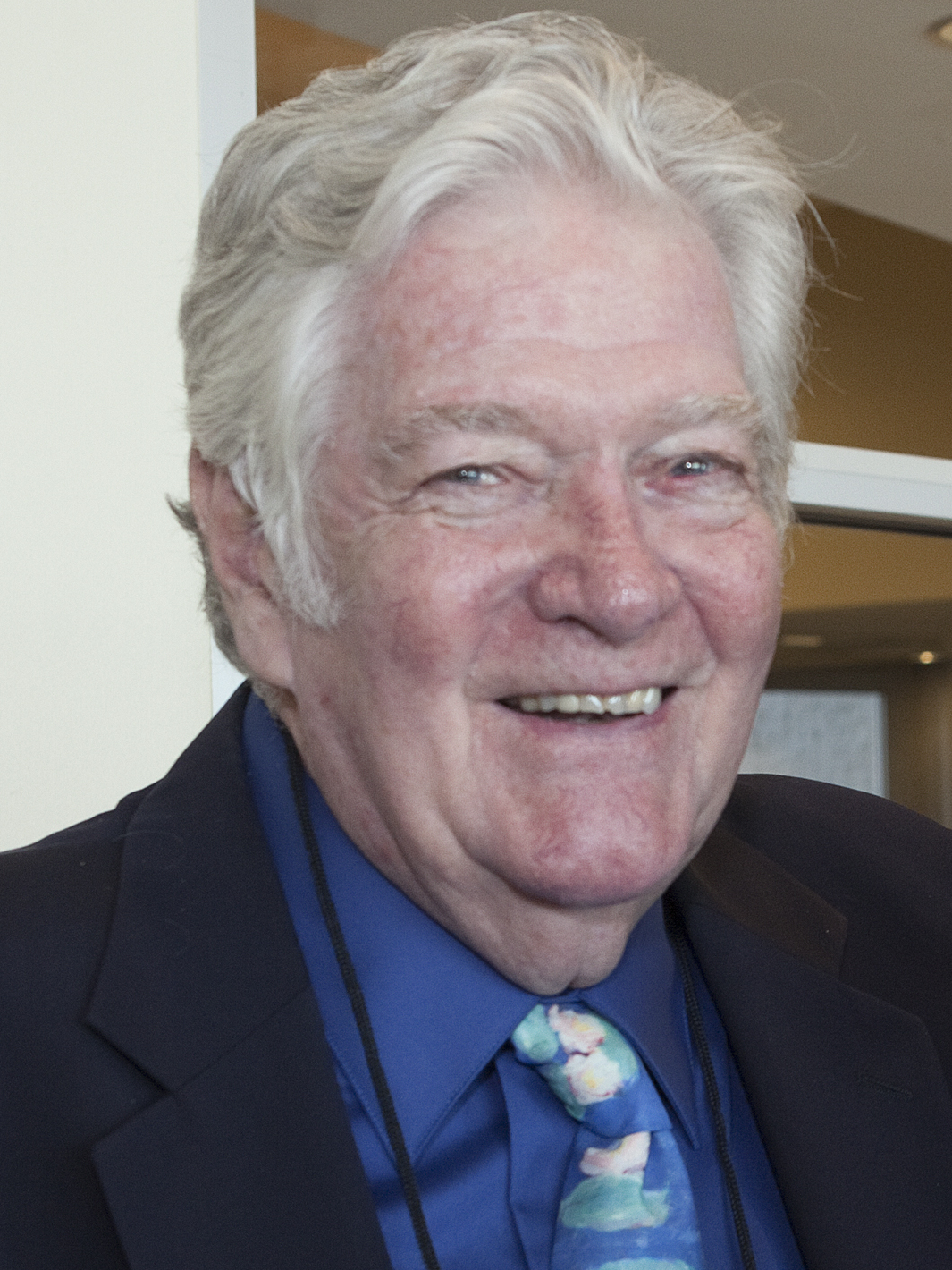

Nominee	J. Joseph Curran Jr.	Edward L. Blanton Jr.
Party	Democratic	Republican
Popular vote	653,087	355,783
Percentage	64.74%	35.26%
- County results Curran: 50–60% 60–70% 70–80% 80–90% Blanton: 50–60%
Attorney General before election
J. Joseph Curran Jr.
Democratic
Elected Attorney General
J. Joseph Curran Jr.
Democratic

The 1990 Maryland attorney general election was held on November 6, 1990, in order to elect the attorney general of Maryland. Democratic nominee and incumbent attorney general J. Joseph Curran Jr. defeated Republican nominee Edward L. Blanton Jr.

== General election ==
On election day, November 6, 1990, Democratic nominee J. Joseph Curran Jr. won re-election by a margin of 297,304 votes against his opponent Republican nominee Edward L. Blanton Jr., thereby retaining Democratic control over the office of attorney general. Curran was sworn in for his second term on January 3, 1991.

=== Results ===
Maryland Attorney General election, 1990
Party	Candidate	Votes	%
Democratic	J. Joseph Curran Jr. (incumbent)	653,087	64.74
Republican	Edward L. Blanton Jr.	355,783	35.26
Total votes		1,008,870	100.00
Democratic hold			
