= 1986 Maryland Attorney General election =

- November 4, 1986
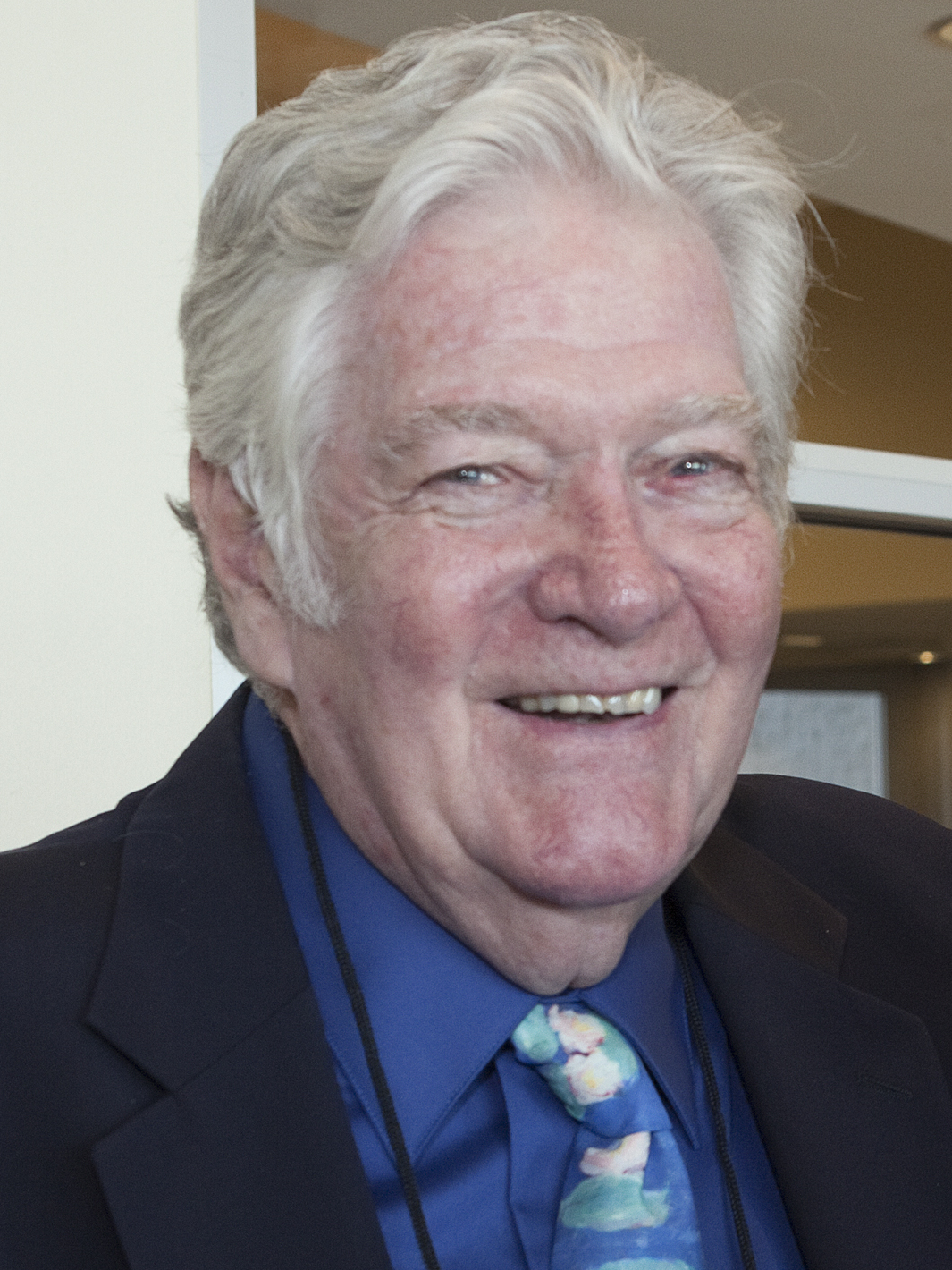
Nominee	J. Joseph Curran Jr.
Party	Democratic
Popular vote	768,170
Percentage	100.00%
- County results Curran: 90–100%
Attorney General before election
Stephen H. Sachs
Democratic
Elected Attorney General
J. Joseph Curran Jr.
Democratic

The 1986 Maryland attorney general election was held on November 4, 1986, in order to elect the attorney general of Maryland. Democratic nominee and incumbent Lieutenant Governor of Maryland J. Joseph Curran Jr. won the election as he ran unopposed.

== General election ==
On election day, November 4, 1986, Democratic nominee J. Joseph Curran Jr. won the election as he ran unopposed, thereby retaining Democratic control over the office of attorney general. Curran was sworn in as the 44th attorney general of Maryland on January 3, 1987.

=== Results ===
Maryland Attorney General election, 1986
Party	Candidate	Votes	%
Democratic	J. Joseph Curran Jr.	768,170	100.00
Total votes		768,170	100.00
Democratic hold			
