= 1978 Maryland Attorney General election =

- November 7, 1978

Nominee	Stephen H. Sachs	Warren K. Rich
Party	Democratic	Republican
Popular vote	649,909	221,951
Percentage	74.54%	25.46%
- County results Sachs: 50–60% 60–70% 70–80% 80–90% Lee: 50–60%
Attorney General before election
George A. Nilson (Acting)
Democratic
Elected Attorney General
Stephen H. Sachs
Democratic

The 1978 Maryland attorney general election was held on November 7, 1978, in order to elect the attorney general of Maryland. Democratic nominee and former United States Attorney for the District of Maryland Stephen H. Sachs defeated Republican nominee Warren K. Rich.

== General election ==
On election day, November 7, 1978, Democratic nominee Stephen H. Sachs won the election by a margin of 427,958 votes against his opponent Republican nominee Warren K. Rich, thereby retaining Democratic control over the office of attorney general. Sachs was sworn in as the 43rd attorney general of Maryland on January 3, 1979.

=== Results ===
Maryland Attorney General election, 1978
Party	Candidate	Votes	%
Democratic	Stephen H. Sachs	649,909	74.54
Republican	Warren K. Rich	221,951	25.46
Total votes		871,860	100.00
Democratic hold			
