= 1982 Maryland Attorney General election =

- November 2, 1982

Nominee	Stephen H. Sachs	Robert N. Dugan
Party	Democratic	Republican
Popular vote	751,030	260,407
Percentage	74.25%	25.75%
- County results Sachs: 50–60% 60–70% 70–80% 80–90%
Attorney General before election
Stephen H. Sachs
Democratic
Elected Attorney General
Stephen H. Sachs
Democratic

The 1982 Maryland attorney general election was held on November 2, 1982, in order to elect the attorney general of Maryland. Democratic nominee and incumbent attorney general Stephen H. Sachs defeated Republican nominee Robert N. Dugan.

== General election ==
On election day, November 2, 1982, Democratic nominee Stephen H. Sachs won re-election by a margin of 490,623 votes against his opponent Republican nominee Robert N. Dugan, thereby retaining Democratic control over the office of attorney general. Sachs was sworn in for his second term on January 3, 1983.

=== Results ===
Maryland Attorney General election, 1982
Party	Candidate	Votes	%
Democratic	Stephen H. Sachs (incumbent)	751,030	74.25
Republican	Robert N. Dugan	260,407	25.75
Total votes		1,011,437	100.00
Democratic hold			
