= Robert W. Curran =

American politician (1950–2026)

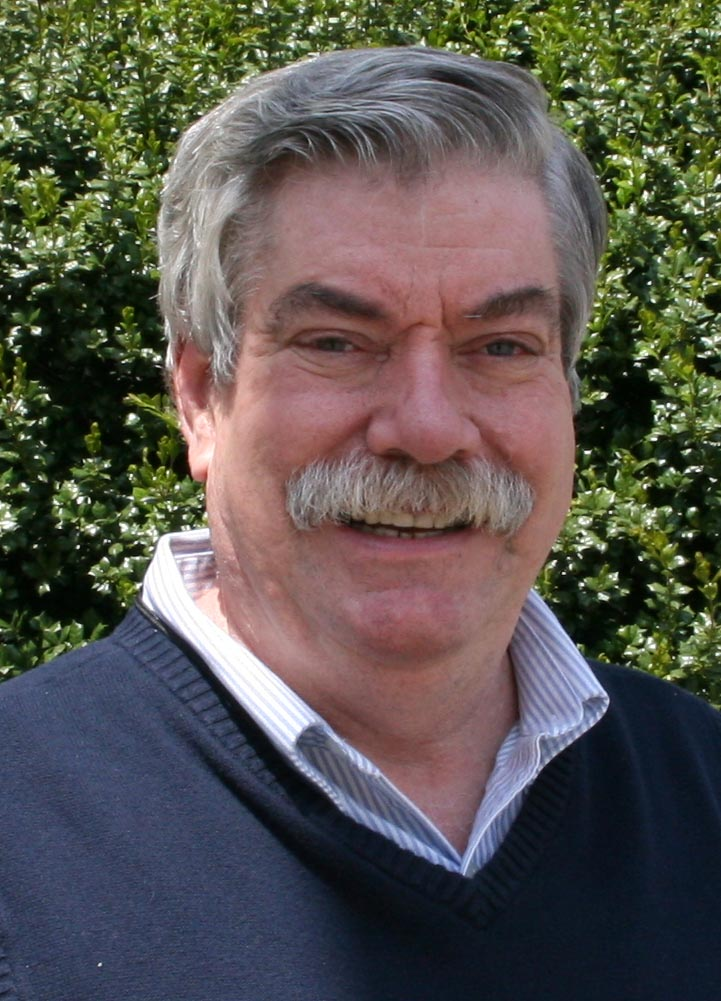
- Curran in 2008

Member of the Baltimore City Council from the 3rd District
- In office December 1995 – December 8, 2016
- Preceded by: Mike Curran
- Succeeded by: Ryan L. Dorsey

Personal details
- Born: July 17, 1950 Baltimore, Maryland, U.S.
- Died: October 30, 2026 (aged 76)
- Party: Democratic
- Spouse: Janice Vetter
- Relations: Mike Curran (brother); J. Joseph Curran Jr. (brother); Katie O'Malley (niece)

Robert W. Curran (July 17, 1950 – October 30, 2026) was an American politician who was a member of the Baltimore City Council representing the third district from 1995 to 2016. A member of a prominent Maryland political family, Curran is the son of J. Joseph Curran Sr., Baltimore City Councilman from 1953 through 1977, a brother of former Maryland attorney general J. Joseph Curran Jr., brother to a former city councilman, Mike Curran, and uncle of Katie O'Malley, wife of former Governor of Maryland, Martin O'Malley.

== Background ==
Curran was born July 17, 1950, in Baltimore, Maryland, the son of Catherine Mary (Clark) and Baltimore City Council member J. Joseph Curran Sr. He attended Loyola High School and graduated in 1968. Curran then attended Mount Saint Mary's College and the Community College of Baltimore.

== In the council ==
Curran was on the council representing the Third District from 1995 to 2016. A former vice chairman of the Baltimore City Council, Curran served as the chair of the Executive Appointments Committee and vice-chair of the council's Judiciary and Legislative Investigations Committee. He was a member of the Budget and Appropriations Committee and the chair of that committee's Labor Subcommittee.

=== Legislative notes ===
- In October 2006 Curran introduced a bill to prohibit smoking in all restaurants and bars, the only workplaces in Baltimore where employees were not protected from second-hand smoke by statute. The bill passed and is currently law in Baltimore City.
- Curran worked with community groups and various city and state agencies on the redevelopment of the former Memorial Stadium site. Currently the site hosts a YMCA center, a park, and mixed-income retirement housing.

== Death ==
Curran died in his sleep on October 30, 2026, at the age of 76.
