= Dawn Moore =

First Lady of Maryland since 2023

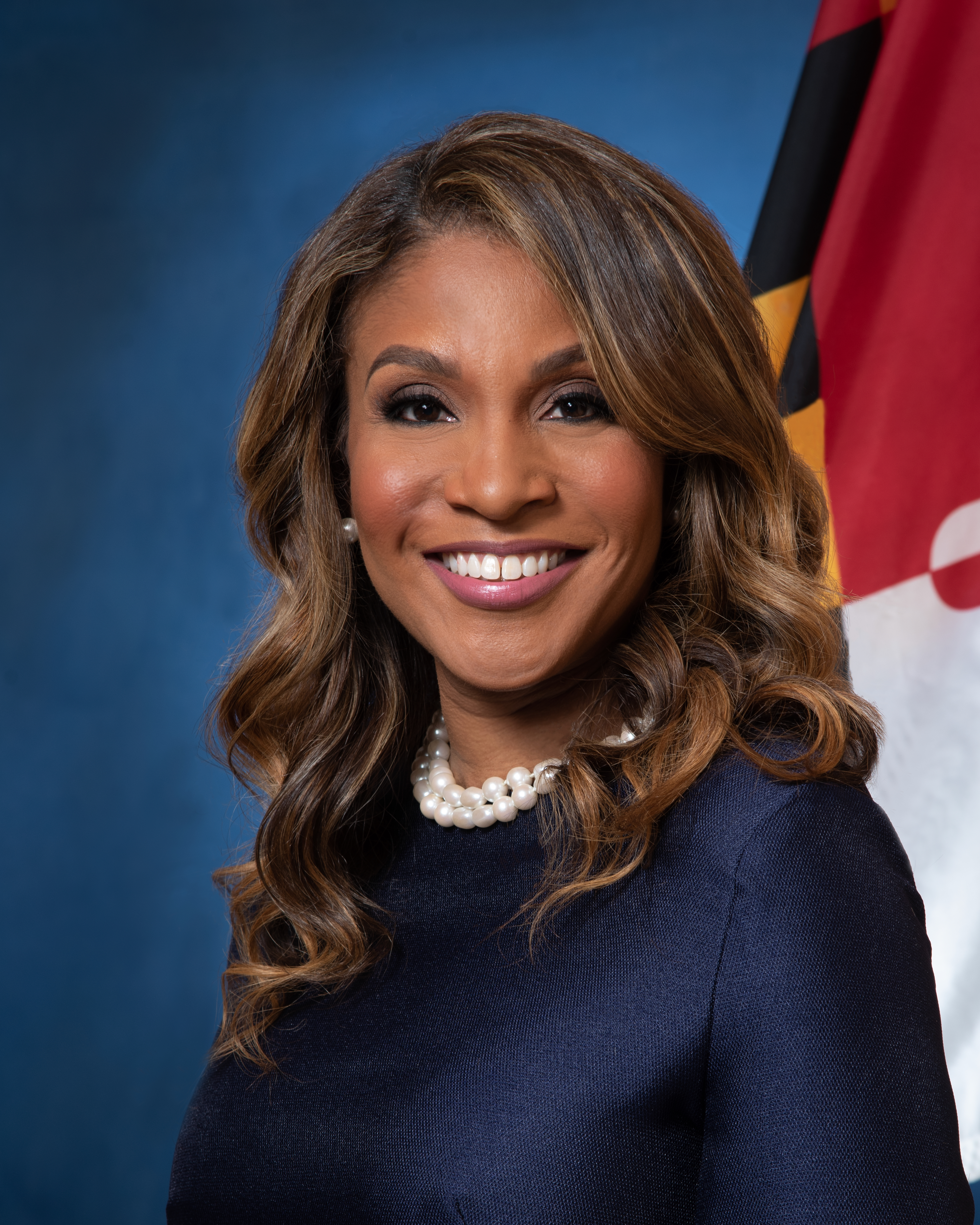
- Official portrait, 2023

First Lady of Maryland
- Current
- Assumed role January 18, 2023
- Governor: Wes Moore
- Preceded by: Yumi Hogan

Personal details
- Born: Dawn Chanté Flythe; August 8, 1975 (age 51) New York City, New York, U.S.
- Party: Democratic
- Spouse: Wes Moore (m. 2007)
- Children: 2
- Education: University of Maryland, College Park (BA)

Dawn Chanté Flythe Moore (née Flythe; born August 8, 1975) is an American campaign strategist and the current first lady of Maryland as the wife of Governor Wes Moore. She is the first African-American first lady in Maryland history.

== Early life and education ==
Flythe was born in Bayside, Queens, to father Earl Flythe, a crane operator for International Union of Operating Engineers Local 14, and mother Pandora Flythe, a music teacher at Public School 100 in South Ozone Park. She graduated from St. Francis Preparatory School. She later attended University of Maryland, College Park, where she earned a Bachelor of Arts degree in government and politics and a certificate in women's studies in 1997.

== Career ==
Flythe began her career in government and politics, accepting the position of Special Assistant to the Secretary in the Community and Intergovernmental Relations Division under Maryland Secretary of State John T. Willis, quickly being promoted as Director of that division. She later worked as a senior policy advisor to Maryland lieutenant governor Kathleen Kennedy Townsend, eventually becoming her field director during the 2002 Maryland gubernatorial election.

In 2004, Flythe ran for Delegate to the Democratic National Convention, representing U.S. senator John Edwards. She won the Democratic primary, receiving 8.9 percent of the vote. However, Flythe did not check in with the rest of the Maryland delegation nor show up to the convention, leading to Democratic Party officials calling up Louise Gallun to serve as an alternate delegate.

During the 2006 Maryland gubernatorial election, Flythe organized a fundraising committee for Martin O'Malley's gubernatorial candidacy. In December 2006, Maryland lieutenant governor-elect Anthony Brown named Flythe as his director of intergovernmental affairs. She later served as his chief of staff until June 2007. In February 2022, the Baltimore Center Stage appointed Moore to its Board of Trustees.

== First Lady of Maryland ==
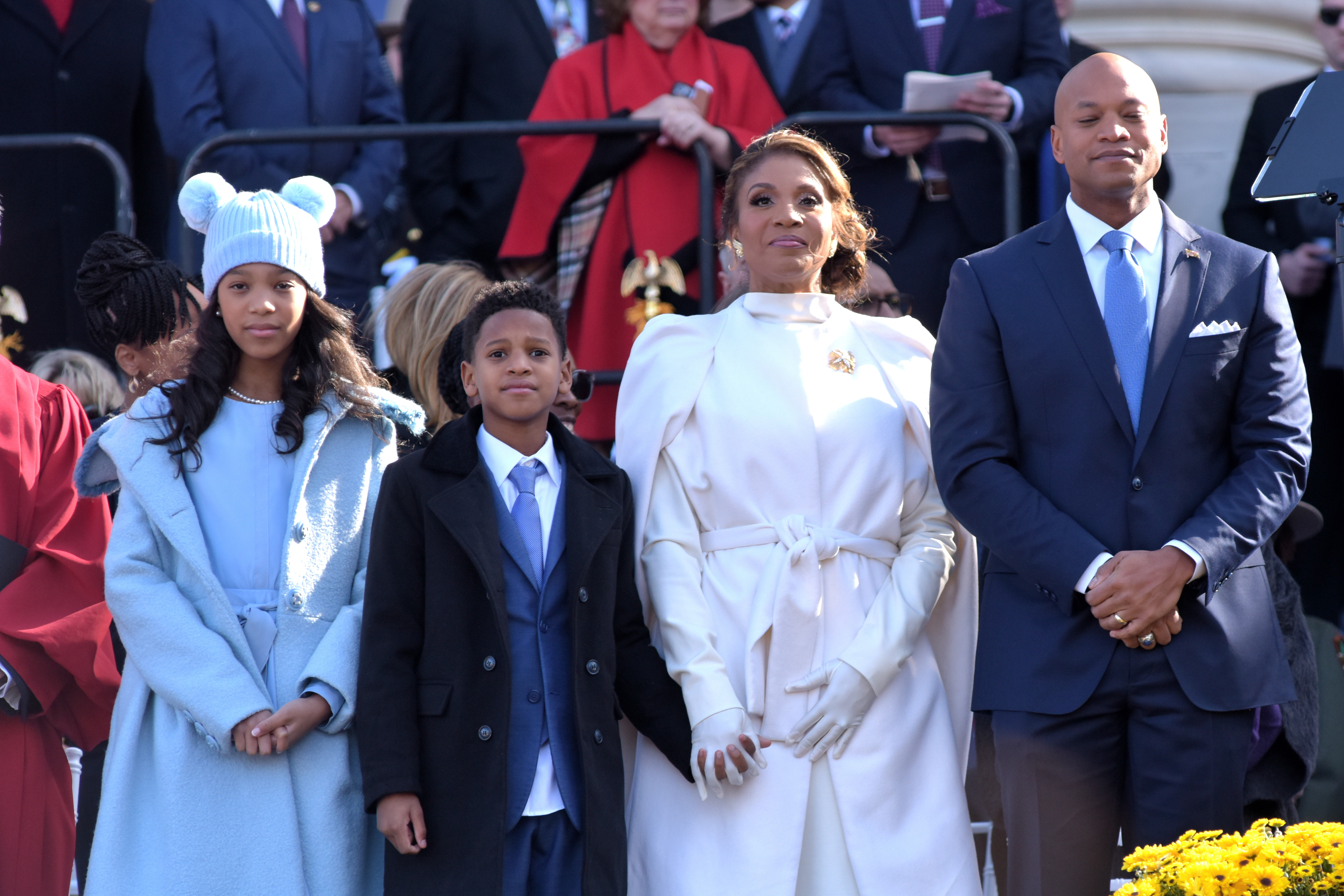
Dawn with Wes Moore and their children at the Maryland gubernatorial inauguration, 2023

Moore became the First Lady of Maryland on January 18, 2023, as her husband Wes Moore was inaugurated as governor of Maryland. She is the first African-American first lady of the state. As first lady, Moore worked with her husband on issues involving military families, mental health, women's economic empowerment, and arts and culture. After assuming office, Moore worked with the Maryland State Archives, the Baltimore Museum of Art, the Foundation for Art and Preservation in Embassies, and the Banneker-Douglass-Tubman Museum to decorate the governor's mansion with artwork that reflected the state's diverse population.

During the 2024 legislative session, Moore testified for the Families Service Act, a bill allowing companies to give preferential hiring to military spouses.

== Personal life ==
Moore met Wes Moore in Washington, D.C. in 2002. They moved to the Riverside community in Baltimore in 2006. The couple eloped in Las Vegas while Wes was on a brief leave from Afghanistan and were married by an Elvis impersonator. Their official wedding ceremony was held on July 6, 2007. They have two children, born 2011 and 2013.

In late 2008, the Moores moved from Riverside to Guilford, where they lived until Wes Moore's election as governor in 2022. They reside in Government House, the official residence of the Maryland governor and First Family in Annapolis, Maryland.

Moore was diagnosed with multiple sclerosis (MS) in her late twenties. She controlled the disease with medication, which she stopped taking once she started having children, and now manages her condition with a strong physical fitness routine, which includes yoga and meditation. In March 2023, Moore said that her MS was in remission.

In November 2025, Moore was inducted into the University of Maryland Alumni Hall of Fame.
