= 2002 Maryland Attorney General election =

- November 5, 2002
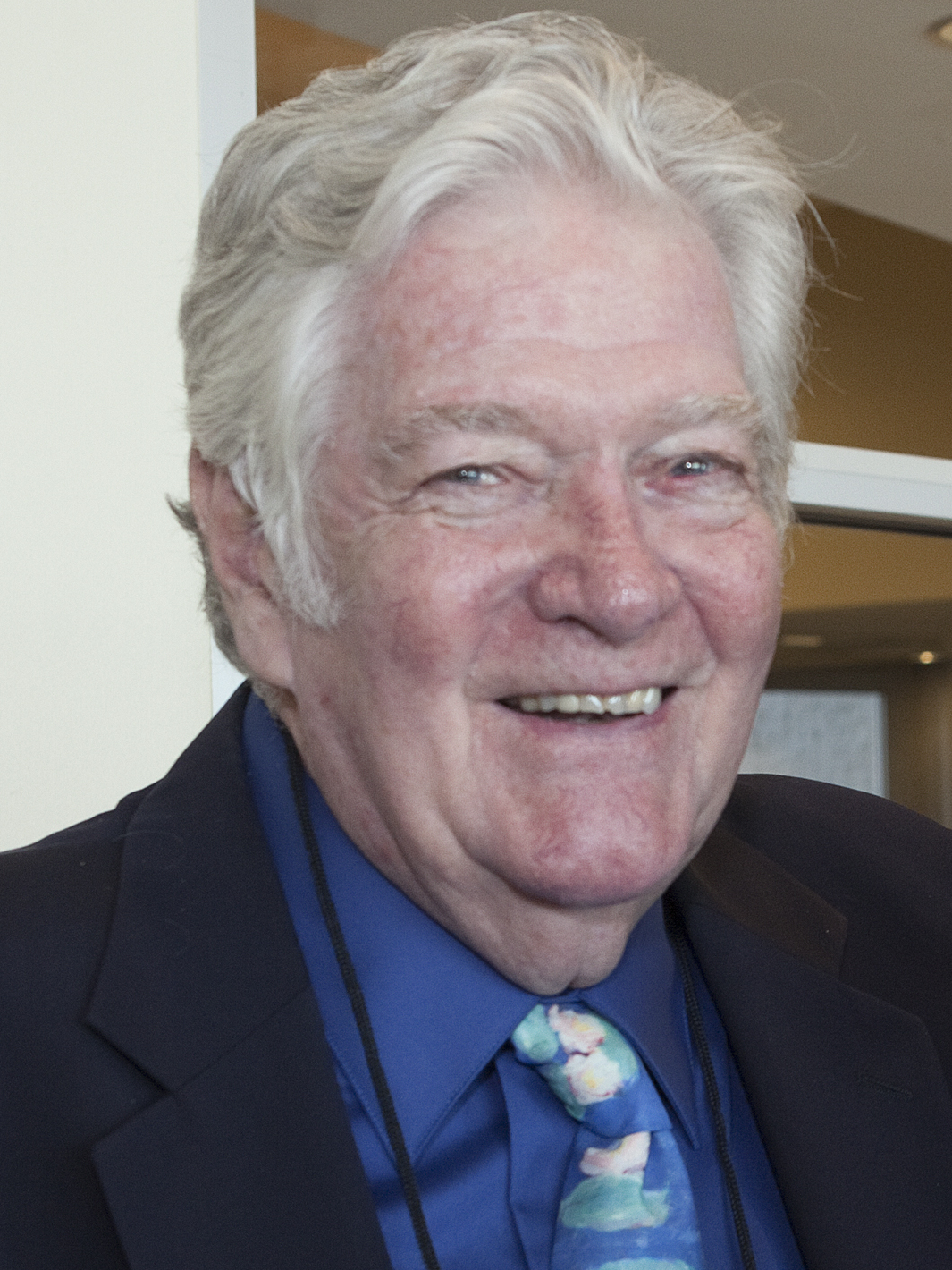

Nominee	J. Joseph Curran Jr.	Edwin MacVaugh
Party	Democratic	Republican
Popular vote	1,064,112	567,569
Percentage	65.17%	34.76%
- County results Curran: 50–60% 60–70% 80–90% MacVaugh: 50–60% 60–70%
Attorney General before election
J. Joseph Curran Jr.
Democratic
Elected Attorney General
J. Joseph Curran Jr.
Democratic

The 2002 Maryland attorney general election was held on November 5, 2002, in order to elect the attorney general of Maryland. Democratic nominee and incumbent attorney general J. Joseph Curran Jr. defeated Republican nominee Edwin MacVaugh.

== General election ==
On election day, November 5, 2002, Democratic nominee J. Joseph Curran Jr. won re-election by a margin of 496,543 votes against his opponent Republican nominee Edwin MacVaugh, thereby retaining Democratic control over the office of attorney general. Curran was sworn in for his fifth term on January 3, 2003.

=== Results ===
Maryland Attorney General election, 2002
Party	Candidate	Votes	%
Democratic	J. Joseph Curran Jr. (incumbent)	1,064,112	65.17
Republican	Edwin MacVaugh	567,569	34.76
	Write-ins	1,158	0.07
Total votes		1,632,839	100.00
Democratic hold			
