= Ann Jennings Johnson =

First Lady of Maryland

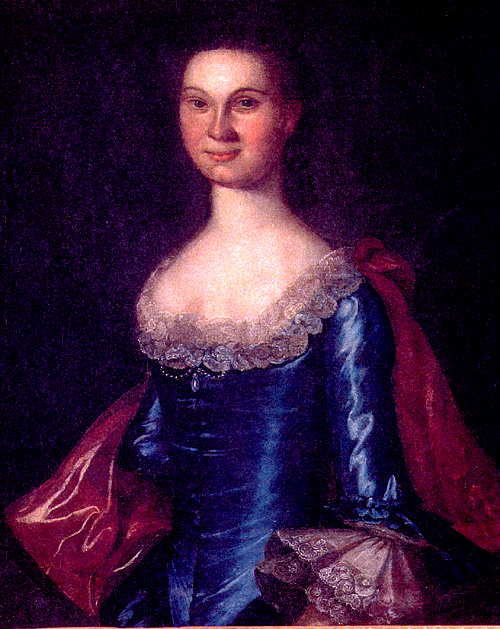
- Portrait of Ann Jennings Johnson by John Hesselius.
- Born: Ann Jennings; May 8, 1745; Annapolis, Maryland, U.S.
- Died: November 22, 1794 (aged 49); Frederick, Maryland, U.S.
- Spouse: Thomas Johnson (m. 1766)
- Children: 8

Ann Jennings Johnson (May 8, 1745 – November 22, 1794) was the inaugural First Lady of Maryland and wife of the first non-colonial Governor of Maryland, Thomas Johnson.

== Early life and family ==
Ann Jennings was born on May 8, 1745, the daughter of Rebecca Sauders Jennings and Judge Thomas Jennings, chief clerk of the Maryland Register of Land Office. Her mother was the daughter of Robert Sauders, and her father was the son of the Reverend Henry Jennings of St. Mary's County, Maryland.

Ann grew up in Annapolis, Maryland in an Episcopal upbringing. Her family attended St. Anne's Parish in Annapolis. In the 1760s, she met Thomas Johnson who was a young man recently employed as an apprentice at the land office where her father worked.

Ann and Thomas wed on February 16, 1766, enjoyed a happy marriage, and had eight children, including one who died in infancy and a second who died as a young adult.

== First Lady ==
After serving as an Anne Arundel County Delegate to the Provincial Assembly and as a Congressman in two Continental Congresses, Thomas Johnson was elected by the legislature as the first governor of Maryland in 1777. With her husband's new position, Ann became the inaugural First Lady in Maryland's history. Ann was in the role of First Lady throughout her husband's governorship from 1777 to 1779. During this period and throughout her husband's political career, Ann was a prominent and influential figure in Annapolis society.

== Later life and death ==
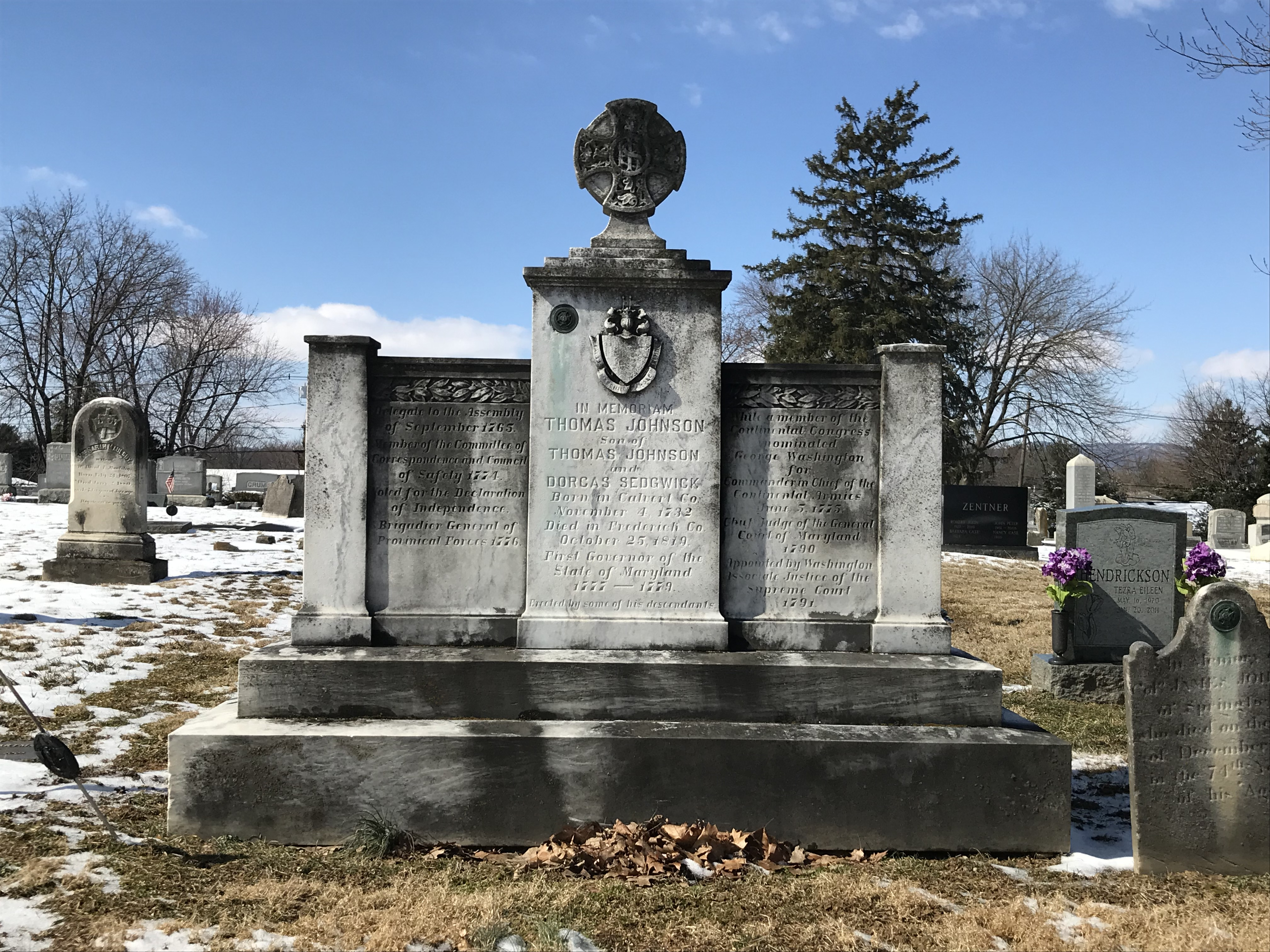
Gravesite at Mount Olivet Cemetery

After Thomas' tenure as governor, the family moved to the newly built Richfield Estate in Frederick, Maryland. Ann continued to support her husband's public service as a member of the Maryland General Assembly and Maryland Senate, Commissioner of the District of Columbia, and as an Associate Justice of the Supreme Court of the United States between 1779 and 1793.

Ann Jennings Johnson died on November 22, 1794, at the age of 49 after a period of illness, and only a few months after her husband's retirement from public service. She was buried at All Saints' Episcopal Church and her remains (along with her husband's) were moved to a new family monument at Mount Olivet Cemetery in 1913.
