= First ladies of Maryland =

Wives of governors of the U.S. state of Maryland

First Lady of Maryland
- Seal of the State of Maryland

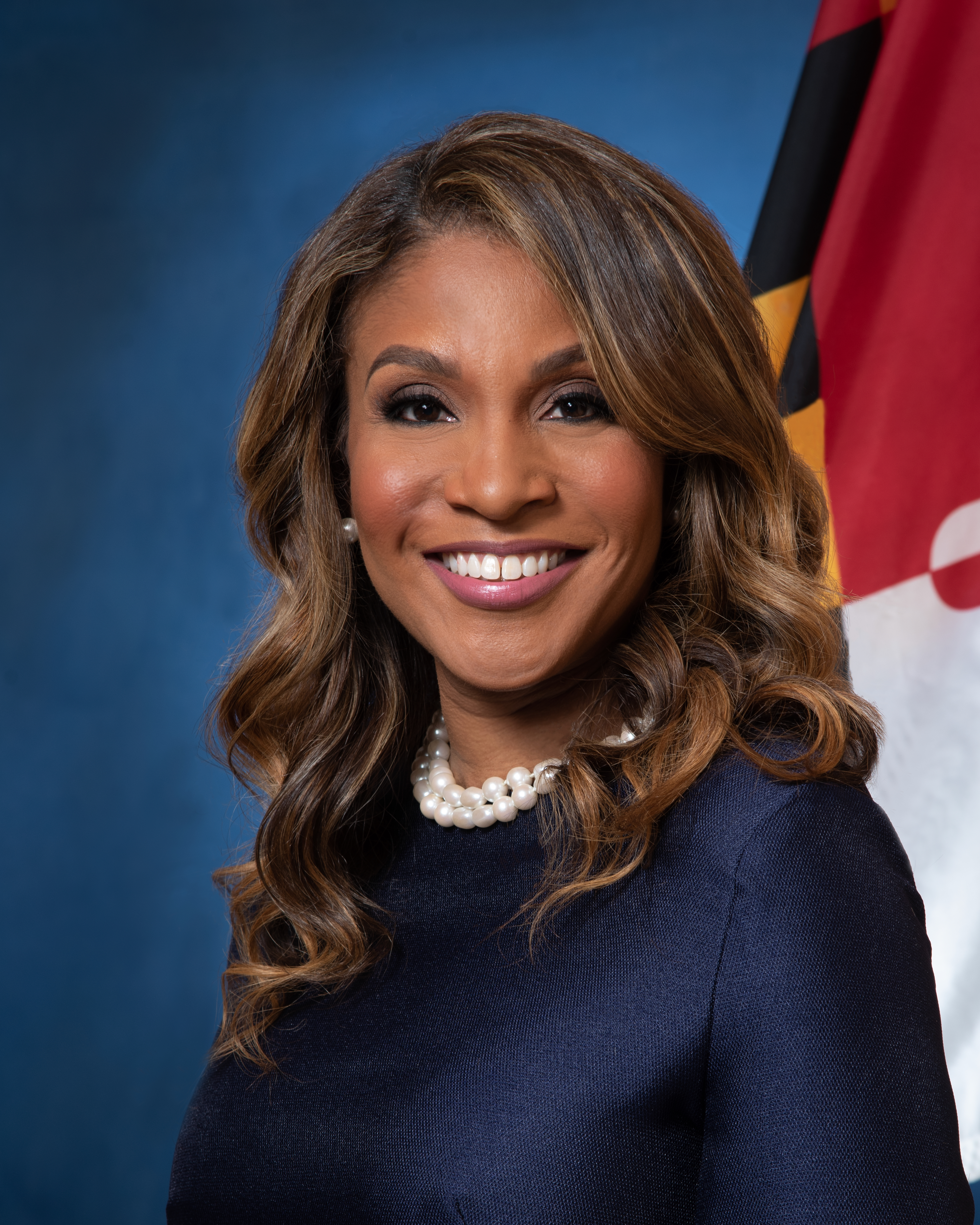
- Incumbent; Dawn Moore since January 18, 2023
- Residence: Government House
- Inaugural holder: Ann Jennings Johnson
- Formation: March 21, 1777; 249 years ago
- Website: Official website

The spouse of the governor of Maryland is given an honorary position, styled as First Lady or First Gentleman of the State of Maryland. To date there have been no female governors of the State of Maryland, and all first spouses have been first ladies.

== List ==
Name	Took office	Left office	Spouse of
Ann Jennings Johnson	1777	1779	Thomas Johnson
Mary Digges Lee	1779	1782	Thomas Sim Lee
Anna Maria Tilghman Chew (hostess for widower)	1782	1785	William Paca
none (Smallwood never married)	1785	1788	William Smallwood
Peggy Chew Howard	1788	1791	John Eager Howard
none (Plater was a widower)	1791	1792	George Plater
Juliana Jennings Brice (acting)	1792	1792	James Brice (acting)
Mary Digges Lee	1792	1794	Thomas Sim Lee
widower	1794	1797	John Hoskins Stone
widower	1797	1798	John Henry
Henrietta Margaret Hill Ogle	1798	1801	Benjamin Ogle
Sophia Sprigg Mercer	1801	1803	John Francis Mercer
Priscilla Mackall Bowie	1803	1806	Robert Bowie
Elizabeth Harriot Robertson Wright	1806	1809	Robert Wright
Sally Scott Murray Lloyd	1809	1811	Edward Lloyd
Priscilla Mackall Bowie	1811	1812	Robert Bowie
Mary Stoughton Sloss Winder	1812	1816	Levin Winder
Priscilla Dorsey Ridgely	1816	1819	Charles Carnan Ridgely
Sarah Goldsborough	1819	1819	Charles Goldsborough
Violetta Lansdale Sprigg	1819	1822	Samuel Sprigg
Eliza May Stevens	1822	1826	Samuel Stevens Jr.
Eleanor Lee Wallace Kent	1826	1826	Joseph Kent
none (Kent was a widower)	1826	1828	Joseph Kent
Alice Contee Kent	1828	1829	Joseph Kent
Mary Clare Maccubbin Martin	1829	1830	Daniel Martin
Julianna Stevenson Carroll	1830	1831	Thomas King Carroll
Mary Clare Maccubbin Martin	1831	1831	Daniel Martin
Prudence Gough Ridgely Howard	1831	1833	George Howard
Elizabeth Courts Thomas	1833	1836	James Thomas
Mary Wallace Veazey	1836	1839	Thomas Veazey
Susan Orrick Sulivane Grason	1839	1842	William Grason
Sally Campbell Preston McDowell Thomas	1842	1842	Francis Thomas
none (couple separated)	1842	1845	Francis Thomas
Adeline Mackubin Kent Pratt	1845	1848	Thomas Pratt
Sarah Maria Kerr Thomas	1848	1851	Philip Francis Thomas
Esther Winder Polk Lowe	1851	1854	Enoch Louis Lowe
Mary Tolly Dorsey Ligon	1854	1858	Thomas Watkins Ligon
none (Hicks was a widower)	1858	1862	Thomas Holliday Hicks
Elizabeth Kell Bradford	1862	1866	Augustus Bradford
Elizabeth Sherlock Swann	1866	1869	Thomas Swann
Alice Carter Bowie	1869	1872	Oden Bowie
Louisa Hollingsworth Whyte	1872	1874	William Pinkney Whyte
none (Groome not married)	1874	1876	James Black Groome
none (Carroll was a widower)	1876	1877	John Lee Carroll
Mary Carter Thompson Carroll	1877	1880	John Lee Carroll
Clara Jenness Hamilton	1880	1884	William Thomas Hamilton
Georgine Urquhart McLane	1884	1885	Robert Milligan McLane
Mary Elizabeth Staplefort Lloyd	1885	1888	Henry Lloyd
Nannie Rider Jackson	1888	1892	Elihu Emory Jackson
Mary Ridgely Preston Brown	1892	1895	Frank Brown
Mary Ridgely Brown Lee (hostess for widower)	1895	1896	Frank Brown
Elizabeth Tasker Lowndes	1896	1900	Lloyd Lowndes Jr.
Mary Frances Richardson Smith	1900	1904	John Walter Smith
Emma Nicodemus Warfield	1904	1908	Edwin Warfield
Lynn Shaffer Ewing (hostess; Crothers never married)	1908	1912	Austin Lane Crothers
Ellen Showell Goldsborough	1912	1916	Phillips Lee Goldsborough
Gertrude Johnson Harrington	1916	1920	Emerson Harrington
Elizabeth Caskie Cabell Ritchie (hostess)	1920	1931	Albert Ritchie
none	1931	1935	Albert Ritchie
Edna Viola Amos Nice	1935	1939	Harry Nice
Eugenia Byrnes O'Conor	1939	1947	Herbert O'Conor
Dorothy Byron Lane	1947	1951	William Preston Lane Jr.
Honolulu Claire Manzer McKeldin	1951	1959	Theodore McKeldin
Helen Avalynne Gibson Tawes	1959	1967	J. Millard Tawes
Elinor Judefind Agnew	1967	1969	Spiro Agnew
Barbara Oberfeld Mandel	1969	1974	Marvin Mandel
Jeanne Blackistone Dorsey Mandel	1974	1979	Marvin Mandel
Mathilde Boal Lee (acting)	1977	1979	Blair Lee III (acting)
Jeanne Blackistone Dorsey Mandel	1979	1979	Marvin Mandel
Patricia Donoho Hughes	1979	1987	Harry Hughes
Hilda Mae Snoops (hostess; Schaefer never married)	1987	1995	William Donald Schaefer
Frances Hughes Glendening	1995	2001	Parris Glendening
none (Glendening not married)	2001	2002	Parris Glendening
Jennifer Crawford	2002	2003	Parris Glendening
Kendel Sibiski Ehrlich	2003	2007	Bob Ehrlich
Catherine Curran O'Malley	2007	2015	Martin O'Malley
Yumi Hogan	2015	2023	Larry Hogan
Dawn Moore	2023	serving	Wes Moore

== See also ==
- List of governors of Maryland
