= Kendel Ehrlich =

American government official (born 1961)

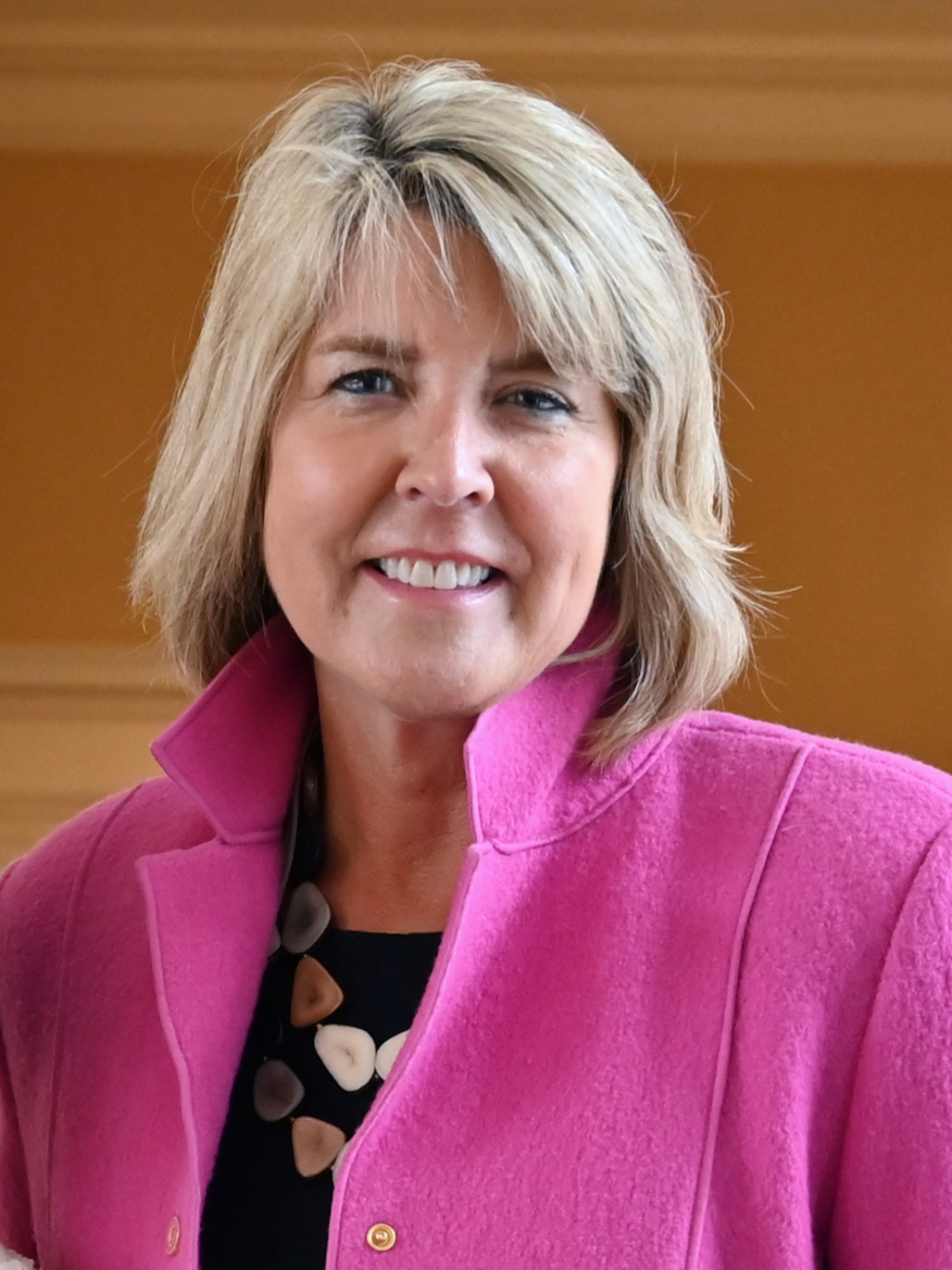
- Ehrlich in 2022

Deputy Director of the Office of National Drug Control Policy
- In office August 2019 – February 2020
- President: Donald Trump

First Lady of Maryland
- In role January 15, 2003 – January 17, 2007
- Governor: Robert Ehrlich
- Preceded by: Jennifer Glendening
- Succeeded by: Katie O'Malley

Personal details
- Born: Kendel Sibiski; October 8, 1961 (age 64) Baltimore, Maryland, U.S.
- Party: Republican
- Spouse: Robert Ehrlich (m. 1993)
- Children: 2 sons
- Education: University of Delaware (1983), University of Baltimore School of Law (1987)
- Occupation: Assistant Public Defender (1990–1995); County Prosecutor (4 years); Cable television Lawyer, Consultant, Producer (1997–2007); Bank Director (from 2007)
- Profession: Attorney (licensed 1987)

Kendel Sibiski Ehrlich (born 1961) is a former first lady of Maryland, having served from 2003 to 2007 during the administration of Maryland governor Robert Ehrlich. She is the first woman of Polish descent to have been Maryland's first lady.

From 2019 to 2020, she served as the deputy director of the Office of National Drug Control Policy, and from March 2020 to 2021 as the director of the Justice Department's Office of Sex Offender Sentencing, Monitoring, Apprehending, Registering, and Tracking (SMART).

== Early life ==
Ehrlich was born in 1961 to parents Walt and Jane Sibiski and raised in Arbutus and Lutherville, Maryland, respectively southwest and north of the city of Baltimore. She attended Dulaney High School, where she was a co-captain of the lacrosse team, and received a B.A. degree in criminal justice from the University of Delaware in 1983 and LL.B. degree from the University of Baltimore School of Law in 1987. She married Robert Ehrlich, then a member of the Maryland House of Delegates, on July 24, 1993.

From 1990 to 1995, Ehrlich was an Assistant Public Defender in Anne Arundel County, Maryland. She also served for four years as a prosecutor with Harford County, Maryland. From 1997 to 2007, Ehrlich worked for Comcast Cable in various capacities, initially as a lawyer, then part-time as a consultant and later a television show producer.

== First lady ==
On October 3, 2003, during her first year as first lady, Mrs. Ehrlich spoke at a domestic violence function and made the statement, "You know, really, if I had an opportunity to shoot Britney Spears, I think I would." She apologized to Spears, and a spokesperson later said that the incident "inadvertently used a figure of speech."

In July 2004, Baltimore magazine published an article on the Ehrlichs' move into Government House, in which the first lady commented on the adjustment involved for the family, and the changes that were made.

Ehrlich joined a steering committee in September 2004 on Underage Drinking Research and Prevention, sponsored by the National Institute on Alcohol Abuse and Alcoholism.

In April 2005, Ehrlich and her husband spoke out against newspapers, particularly The Baltimore Sun and The Washington Post, as being biased and unfair.

The Washington Post reported in June 2005 that the first lady had played a very active role in decisions such as "appointments and policy initiatives". Asked about her advisory influence in 2003, Ehrlich's response was summarized as its only being on the issue of "loyalty within his administration".

== Subsequent activities ==
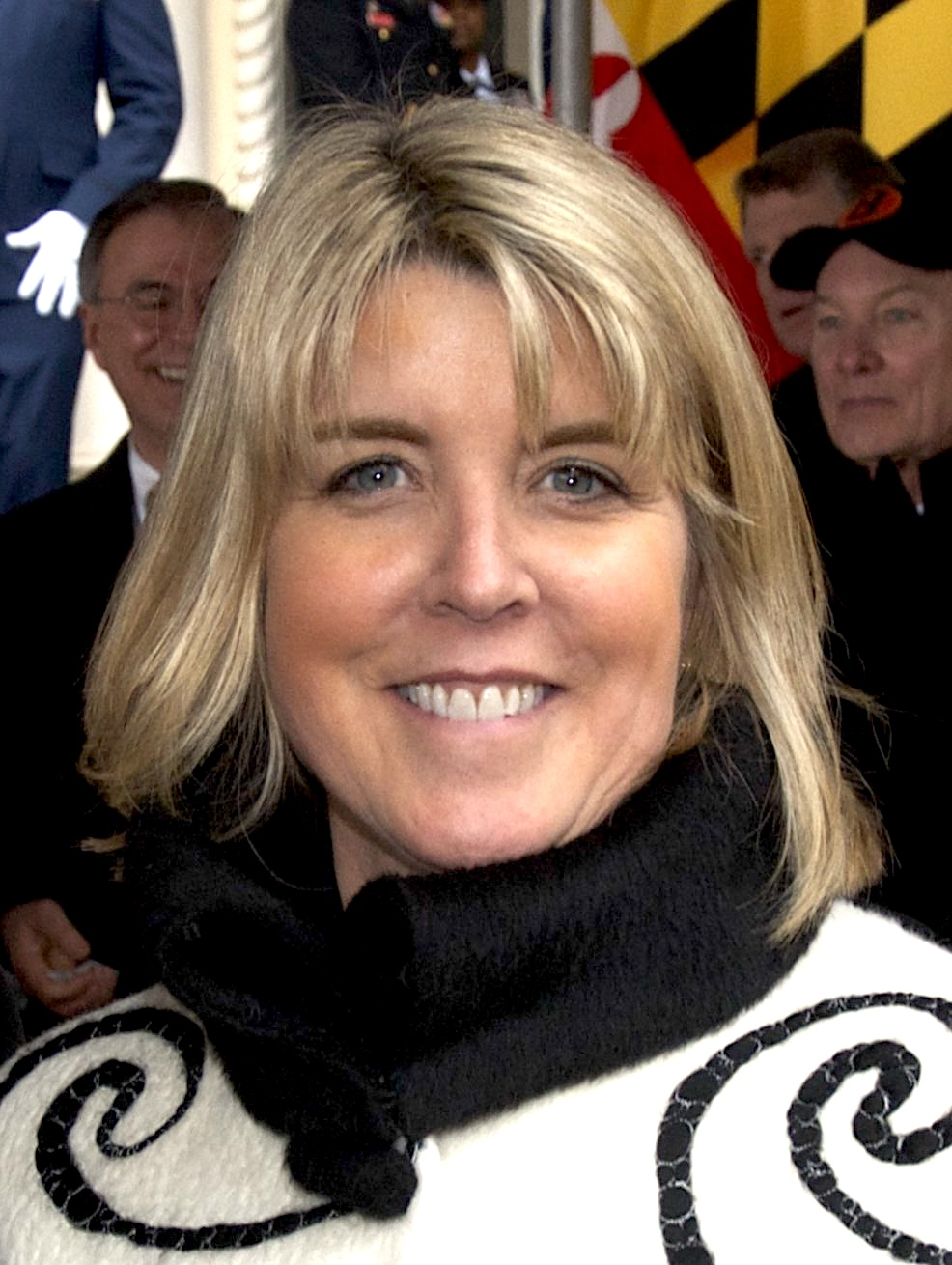
Ehrlich in 2015

After her husband left office, Ehrlich took a job as a director for BankAnnapolis. She and her husband have also hosted a Saturday radio show on WBAL-AM. By mid-2009, rumors began to surface regarding the prospect of Kendel Ehrlich's running for elected office herself. Her husband was defeated by Martin O'Malley in the 2006 and 2010 Maryland gubernatorial races.

On March 2, 2015, longtime U.S. Senator Barbara Mikulski announced that she would not seek re-election in 2016. Former First Lady Kendel Ehrlich had been mentioned as a potential Republican candidate for the open seat in the 2016 Senate election, though she did not run for the office. In October 2015, Ehrlich was sworn in as an assistant state's attorney in Anne Arundel County, Maryland, and left the position in 2018.

On July 31, 2019, President Trump announced his intention to appoint Ehrlich to be Deputy Director of the Office of National Drug Control Policy. On February 28, 2020, Trump announced he would nominate her to lead the DOJ's Office of Sex Offender Sentencing, Monitoring, Apprehending, Registering, and Tracking (SMART) within the Office of Justice Programs; she was sworn in as the director on March 16, 2020, and was succeeded by an acting director in early 2021.

Honorary titles
Preceded by Jennifer Crawford Glendening	First Lady of Maryland; January 15, 2003 – January 17, 2007	Succeeded by Katie O'Malley
