= Yumi Hogan =

Korean–American artist (born 1959)

- 호건 유미
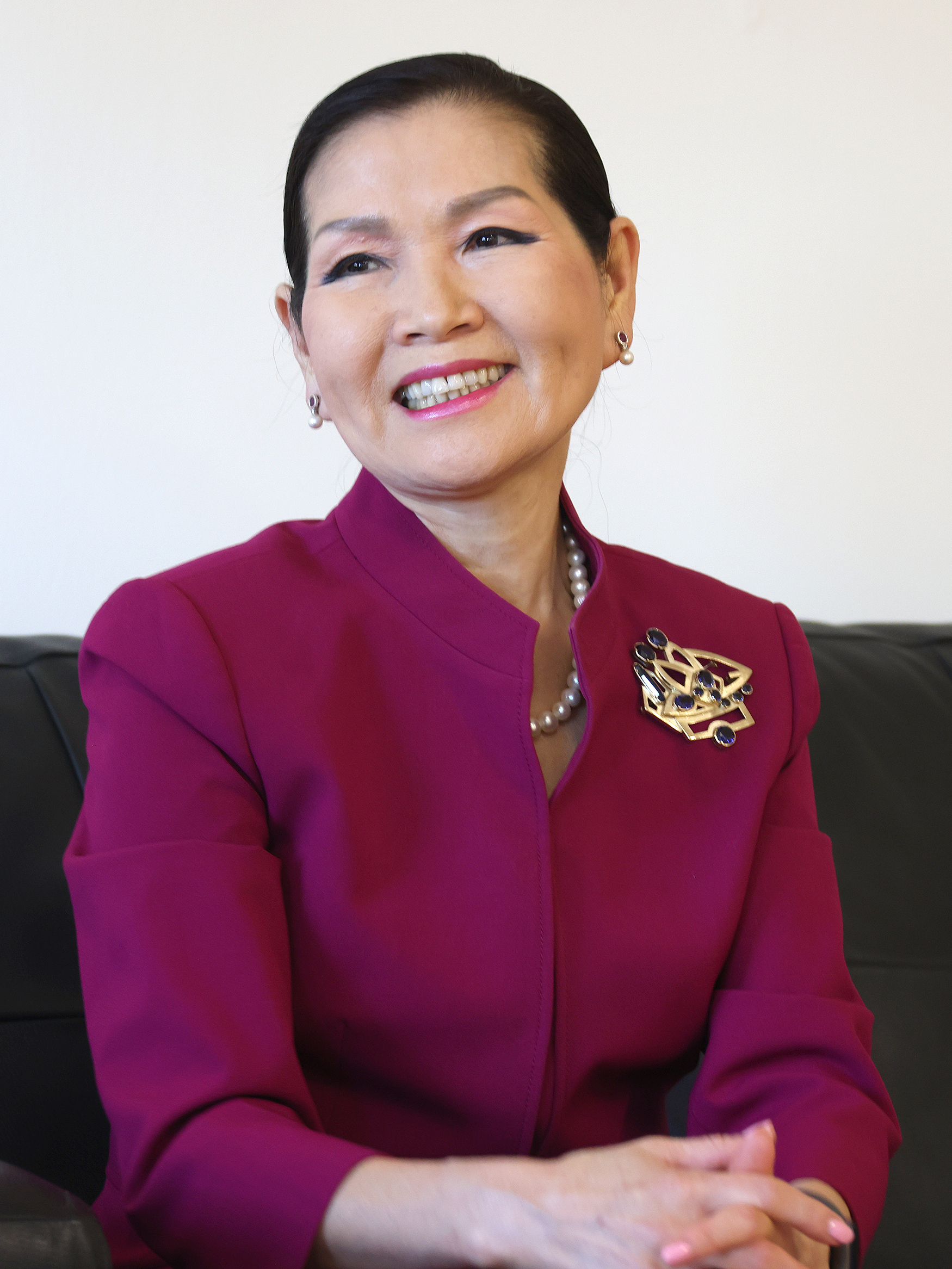
- Hogan in 2022

First Lady of Maryland
- In role January 21, 2015 – January 18, 2023
- Governor: Larry Hogan
- Preceded by: Katie O'Malley
- Succeeded by: Dawn Moore

Personal details
- Born: Yumi Kim; December 25, 1959 (age 66) Naju, South Korea
- Spouse: Larry Hogan (m. 2004)
- Children: 3
- Education: Maryland Institute College of Art (BFA); American University (MFA)
- Awards: Ellis Island Medal of Honor (2017)

- Yumi Hogan
- Hangul: 김유미
- RR: Gim Yumi
- MR: Kim Yumi

Yumi Hogan (Korean: 유미 호건, née Kim; born December 25, 1959) is a Korean–American artist. She served as the first lady of Maryland as wife of Governor Larry Hogan from 2015 to 2023, and is the first Korean American first lady of a U.S. state and the first Asian American first lady in the history of Maryland.

== Early life ==
Yumi Kim was born on December 25, 1959, in Naju, South Korea. She is the youngest of eight children and grew up on a chicken farm in the rural South Jeolla Province. She immigrated to the United States with her first husband while in her twenties.

== Career and education ==
Hogan is an artist. Following encouragement from her husband, she earned a Bachelor of Fine Arts in Painting degree from Maryland Institute College of Art in 2008 and a Master of Fine Arts degree from American University in 2010.

Hogan's artwork, primarily abstract landscapes in Sumi ink on Korean Hanji paper, has been shown locally and around the world. Twenty-seven of her abstract landscape paintings were featured at an art show at the Ocean City Center for the Arts in July 2017, with sales proceeds from her exhibit donated to art therapy programs for pediatric cancer patients. In late 2017, Hogan launched an art therapy program at the University of Maryland Children's Hospital via her Yumi C.A.R.E.S Foundation.

Her work was featured at an exhibition in May and June 2019 by the University of Maryland University College Arts Program, in which it was described as blending Maryland and Korean landscapes.

While First Lady of Maryland, Hogan continued to teach as an adjunct faculty member at her alma mater, Maryland Institute College of Art.

In 2016, Hogan had a gallery showing of paintings inspired by her husband's cancer diagnosis and recovery.

== First Lady of Maryland ==
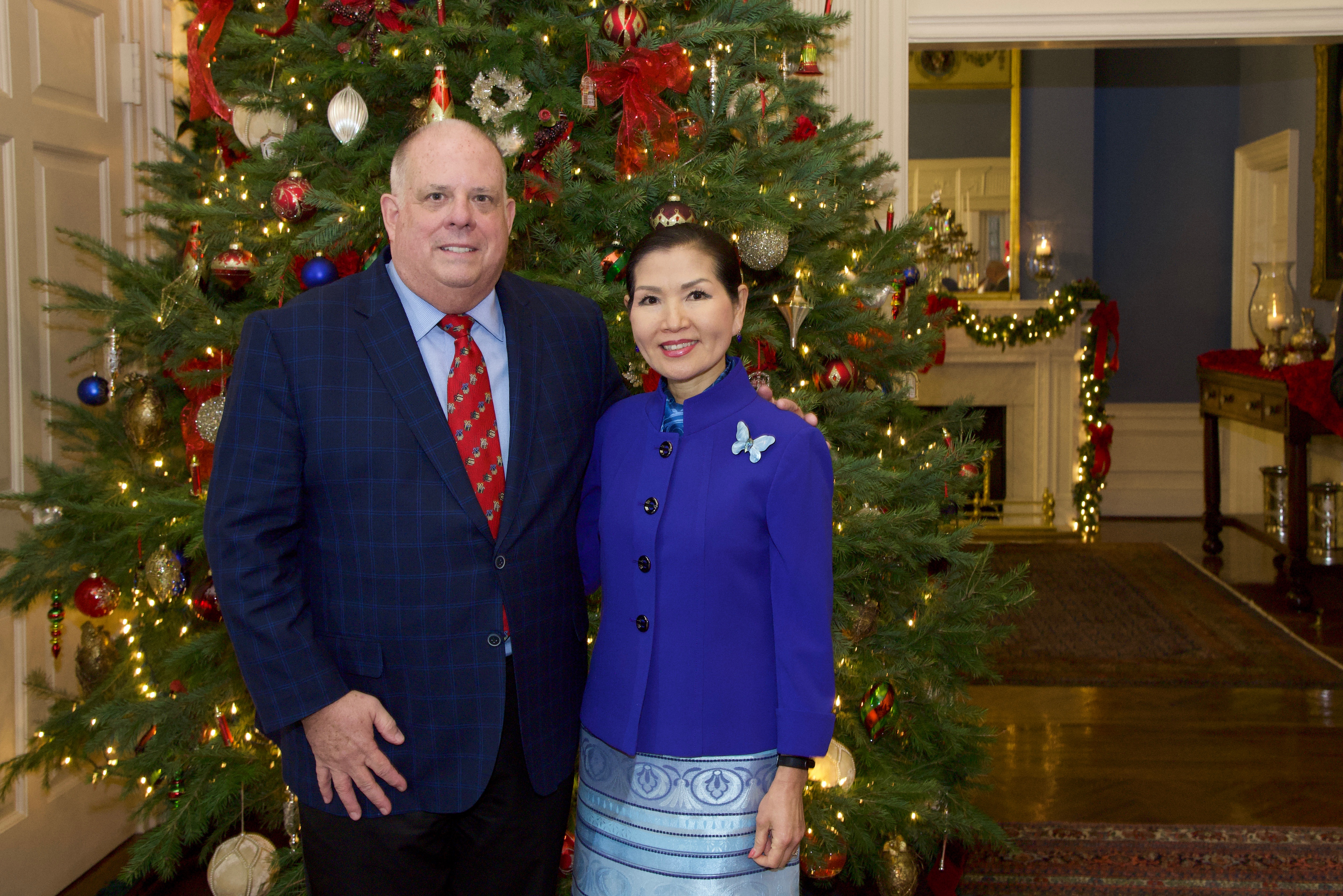
Yumi with her husband Larry Hogan in 2018.

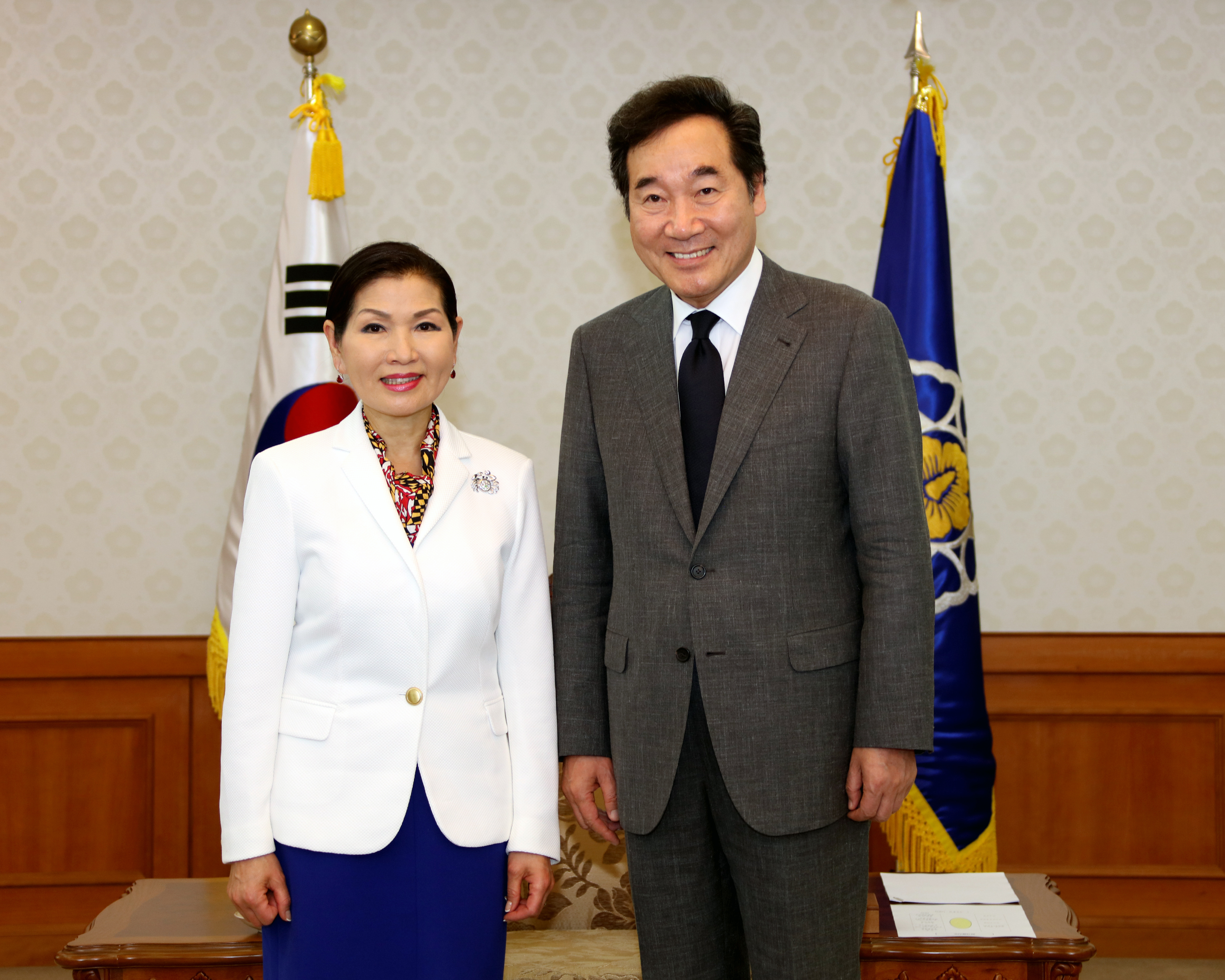
Hogan with South Korean Prime Minister Lee Nak-yon in 2017

Yumi Hogan became First Lady of Maryland on January 21, 2015, when Larry Hogan was inaugurated as Governor of Maryland. She is the first Korean American first lady of a U.S. state and the first Asian American first lady in the history of Maryland. Five months into her husband's term, he was diagnosed with non-Hodgkin lymphoma. Hogan served as her husband's caregiver and unofficial nurse. Her public initiatives shifted upon his recovery, and she began advocating the benefits of art therapy, especially for cancer patients.

In 2016, Hogan received the International Leadership Foundation's Inspirational Leader Award. She is also a 2017 recipient of the Ellis Island Medal of Honor.

In September 2018, Hogan received the National Association of Secretaries of State Medallion Award for her advocacy and work to benefit victims of domestic violence and human trafficking.

In April 2020, Hogan worked with her husband and South Korean Ambassador to the United States Lee Soo-hyuck to obtain 500,000 testing kits for $9.46 million during the 2020 coronavirus pandemic in Maryland. However they turned out to be flawed and were never used. The Hogan administration quietly paid the same South Korean company another $2.5 million for 500,000 replacement tests. According to the findings of a state audit released in April 2021, the purchase of them was based on a flawed agreement and most of the replacement tests were likely never used.

== Personal life ==
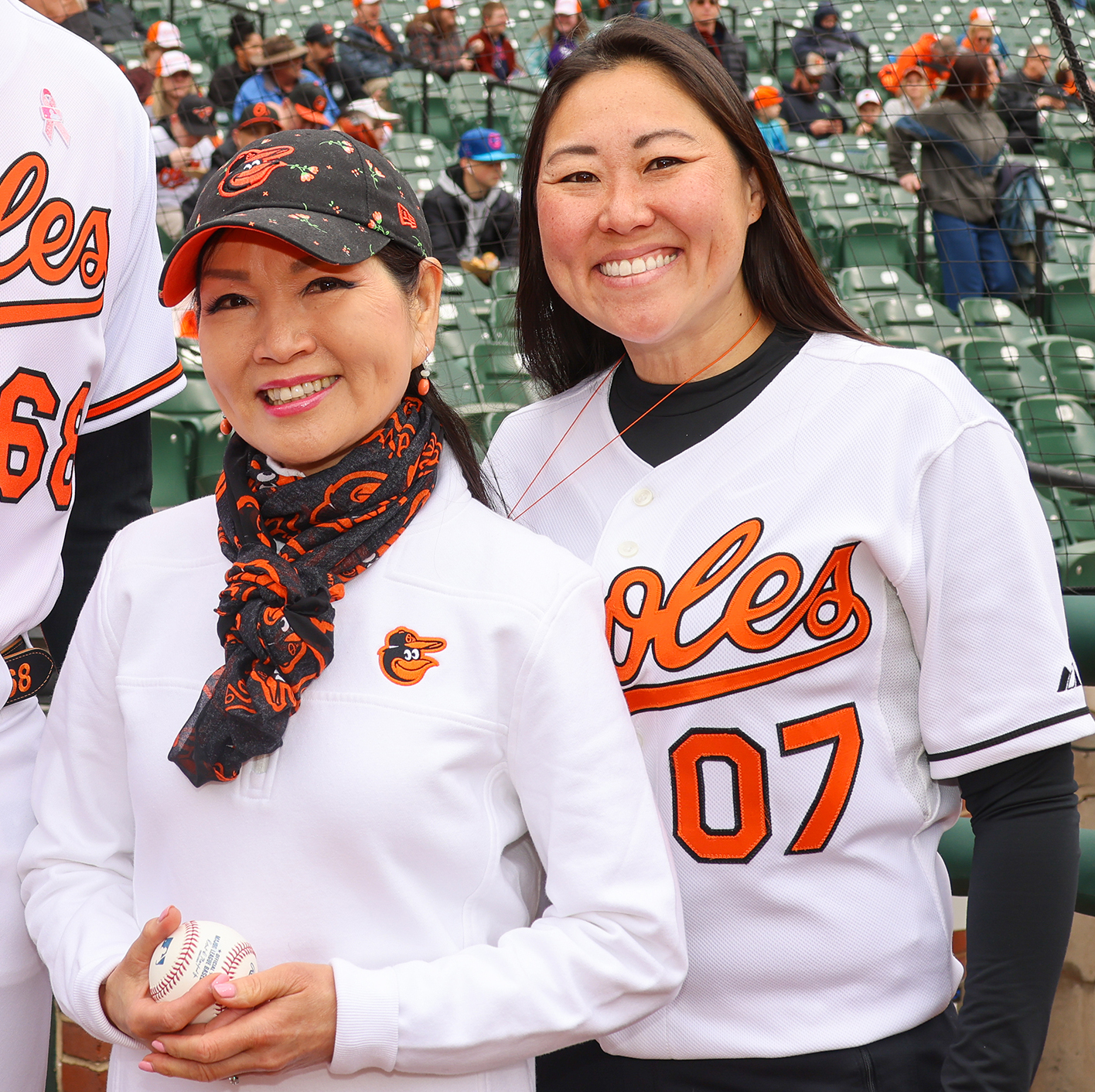
Hogan (left) with her daughter, Jaymi, on Mother's Day in 2022

Yumi Kim and her first husband had three daughters. She moved to Howard County, Maryland, in 1992 after divorcing her first husband. To support her daughters, she taught art in her basement and worked as a cashier. She became a U.S. citizen in 1994. She met Larry Hogan at an art show in Columbia in 2001. They were married in 2004 at Paca House and Garden in Annapolis. Self-described as "traditional", Yumi Hogan holds Presbyterian religious beliefs, was reluctant to tell her family of her divorce, and did not live with Larry Hogan until they were married. In May 2018, the Hogans adopted two rescued Shih Tzu dogs.

== See also ==
- Asian Americans in government and politics
- List of Asian-American firsts
- List of American women's firsts

Honorary titles
Preceded by Katie O'Malley	First Lady of Maryland; 2015–2023	Succeeded by Dawn Moore
