= Muriel Humphrey =

American politician (1912–1998)

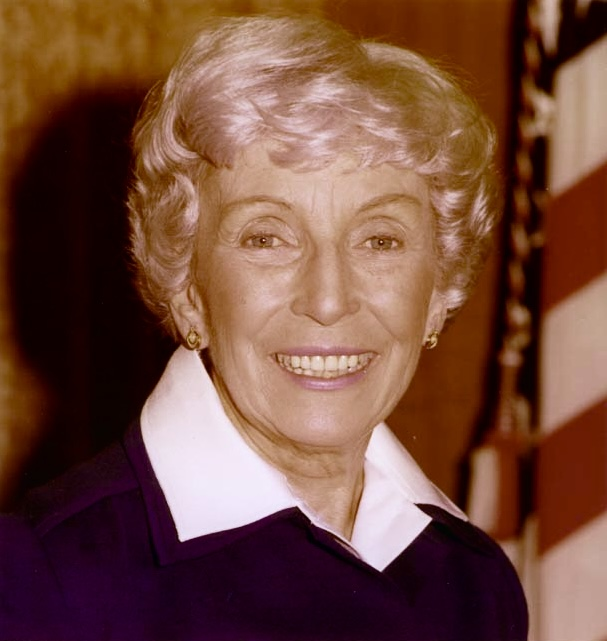
- Official portrait, 1978

United States Senator from Minnesota
- In office January 25, 1978 – November 7, 1978
- Appointed by: Rudy Perpich
- Preceded by: Hubert Humphrey
- Succeeded by: David Durenberger

Second Lady of the United States
- In role January 20, 1965 – January 20, 1969
- Vice President: Hubert Humphrey
- Preceded by: Lady Bird Johnson
- Succeeded by: Judy Agnew

First Lady of Minneapolis
- In role July 2, 1945 – November 30, 1948
- Mayor: Hubert Humphrey
- Preceded by: Lucille Kline
- Succeeded by: Hildur Hoyer

Personal details
- Born: Muriel Fay Buck; February 20, 1912 Huron, South Dakota, U.S.
- Died: September 20, 1998 (aged 86) Minneapolis, Minnesota, U.S.
- Resting place: Lakewood Cemetery, Minneapolis, Minnesota
- Party: Democratic
- Spouses: Hubert Humphrey (m. 1936; died 1978); Max Brown (m. 1981)
- Children: 4, including Skip
- Education: Huron University

Muriel Fay Humphrey Brown (née Buck; February 20, 1912 – September 20, 1998) was an American politician who served as the second lady of the United States from 1965 to 1969, and as a U.S. Senator from Minnesota in 1978. She was married to the 38th vice president of the United States, Hubert Humphrey. Following her husband's death, she was appointed to his seat in the United States Senate, serving for most of the year 1978, thus becoming the first woman to serve as a senator from Minnesota. After leaving office, she remarried and took the name Muriel Humphrey Brown.

== Early life and marriage ==
Humphrey was born Muriel Fay Buck on February 20, 1912, in Huron, South Dakota, daughter of Andrew E. Buck and his wife, the former Jessie Mae Pierce. She attended Huron College and met her future husband, Hubert Humphrey, in 1934, when she was twenty-two years old and working as a bookkeeper. They married on September 3, 1936, saying, "It was love at first waltz". After living with their daughter in South Dakota, she moved to the South to join her husband when he pursued a graduate degree at Louisiana State University, where she found work in the Department of Government as a typist.

She had four children: Hubert III, Nancy, Robert, and Douglas. The Humphreys built a home and moved to Waverly, a small village west of Minneapolis, in the mid-1950s and maintained it as their primary residence until Hubert Humphrey was elected vice president in the U.S. presidential election of 1964.

== Political life ==
Muriel served as an informal adviser to her husband after he entered politics. His first office was mayor of Minneapolis. From there, he served three consecutive terms as senator from Minnesota. It was during his second Senatorial campaign that Muriel began making campaign appearances alongside her husband.

Hubert Humphrey ran for his party's nomination in the Presidential primaries of 1960, losing to John F. Kennedy; during this campaign, Muriel made speeches for him in Wisconsin. Humphrey remained in the senate and President Lyndon B. Johnson chose him as his vice-presidential running mate in 1964. With Muriel often campaigning alongside her husband and being profiled favorably in US media, the ticket won the election. Hubert thereafter served as Vice President of the United States from January 1965 to January 1969.

As Second Lady of the United States, Muriel had a busy schedule of travel and involvement in various causes. A catalogue of her papers at the Minnesota Historical Society gives a clear sense of the breadth of activities. She served as a member of the President's Committee for People with Intellectual Disabilities from 1966 to 1969, convened many meetings of women associated with the Democratic Party, and travelled extensively.

During her husband's subsequent run for president in 1968, Muriel made a number of public appearances, garnering praise from President Johnson. After Hubert lost the 1968 election to former Vice President Richard M. Nixon, he made a decision which would ultimately lead to Muriel's entry into politics: He chose to run for a US Senate seat from Minnesota in the 1970 elections. Hubert won the election and returned to the Senate in January 1971.

Hubert Humphrey died of bladder cancer on January 13, 1978. He was 66. Muriel was nominated by the Democratic-Farmer-Labor Party and subsequently appointed to the Senate vacancy by Minnesota Governor Rudy Perpich, serving from January 25 to November 7, 1978, in the 95th Congress. She was the first spouse of a former vice president to serve in Congress as well as the first woman to represent Minnesota in the U.S. Senate, preceding the Democrats Amy Klobuchar and Tina Smith.

Muriel had years of experience as a public speaker, and was an active senator. According to Karina Karr, Humphrey was ostracised by the all-male Senate, but served on the Foreign Relations Committee and voted reliably to support the foreign policy of the Jimmy Carter administration. According to an official Congressional biographical summary, "Muriel Humphrey pursued her own interests during her brief tenure, supporting an extension of the Equal Rights Amendment (ERA) ratification deadline and advocating several programs to benefit persons with mental disabilities."

Among the issues which she championed was public visibility for Down Syndrome, a topic she had become passionate about due to her granddaughter Victoria Solmonson's condition. During her husband's presidential campaign in 1967 and 1968, she visited facilities for people with Down Syndrome in Long Island and was featured by the New York Times. In 1970, she gave a speech on this topic which was reprinted in a prestigious medical journal. As a senator, she sponsored the Mental Health Advocacy Act of 1978.

After consulting with President Jimmy Carter, Muriel chose not to stand as a candidate for the 1978 United States Senate special election in Minnesota for the remaining term. "It was the most challenging thing I've done in my whole life," she said.

Looking back at her political life, Humphrey reflected "There's something I've been wanting to say for a long time. I'm a liberal and I'm proud of it. In fact, I was probably a little more liberal than Hubert was. I just wanted to say that." While in office, and after, she pressed for the right for women to choose to have an abortion and worked towards legislation for the rights of the mentally disabled.

== Second marriage ==
In 1981, Humphrey married Max Brown, a friend from childhood. "I don't live a life of politics any more," she said after her second marriage. "Max and I have so much fun. We have a wonderful companionship that Hubert and I didn't have, couldn't have. We were so busy and it was so official almost all the time." She died in 1998. Max Brown died in 2004 at age 93.

== See also ==
- Women in the United States Senate

Honorary titles
Preceded by Margaret Lucille Kline	First Lady of Minneapolis; 1945–1948	Succeeded by Hildur Hoyer
Vacant Title last held by Lady Bird Johnson	Second Lady of the United States; 1965–1969	Succeeded by Judy Agnew
U.S. Senate
Preceded by Hubert Humphrey	United States Senator (Class 1) from Minnesota; 1978; Served alongside: Wendell Anderson	Succeeded by David Durenberger
