= 1998 Maryland Attorney General election =

- November 3, 1998
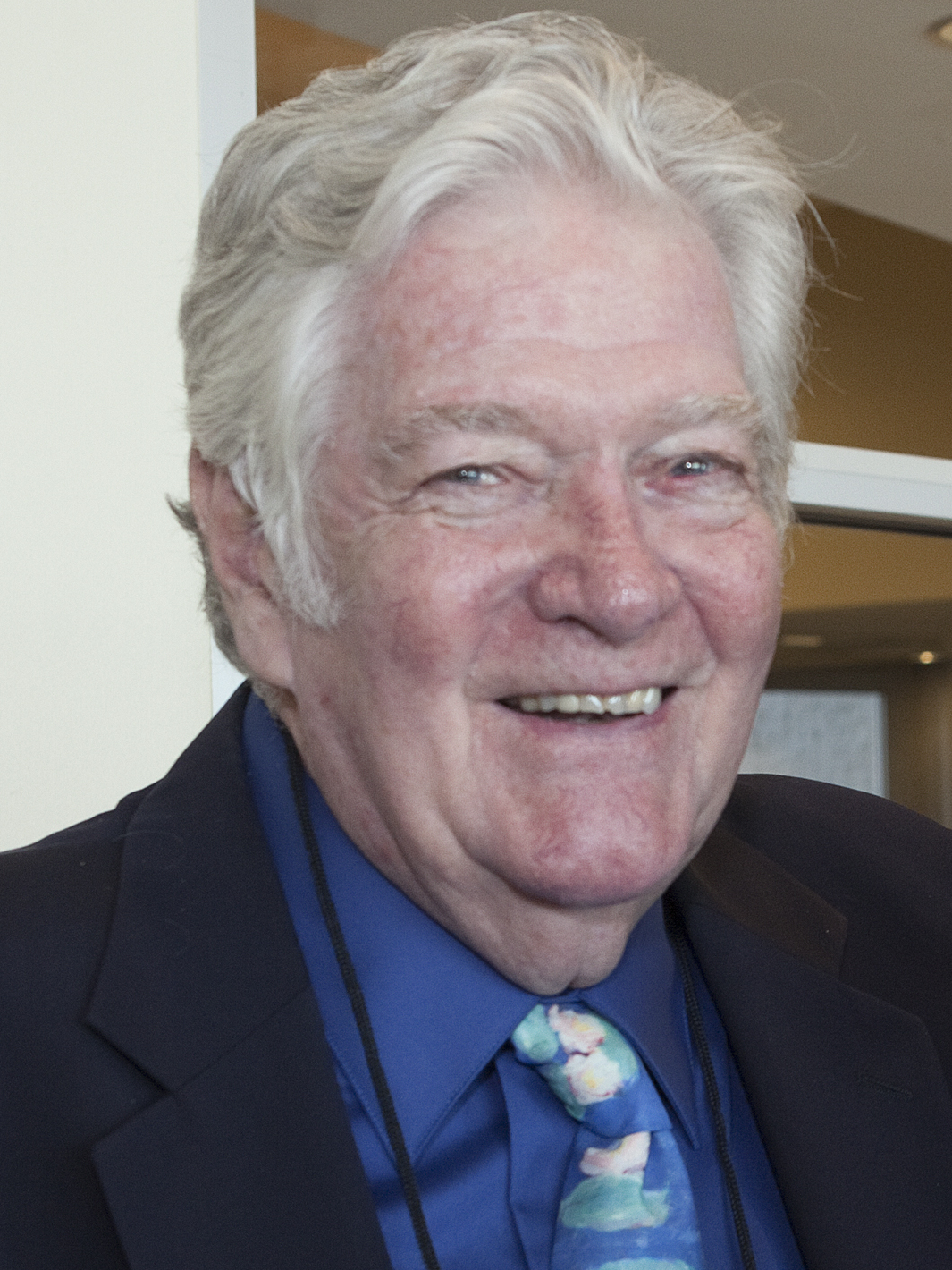

Nominee	J. Joseph Curran Jr.	Paul H. Rappaport
Party	Democratic	Republican
Popular vote	922,655	531,430
Percentage	63.45%	36.55%
- County results Curran: 50–60% 60–70% 70–80% 80–90% Rappaport: 50–60% 60–70%
Attorney General before election
J. Joseph Curran Jr.
Democratic
Elected Attorney General
J. Joseph Curran Jr.
Democratic

The 1998 Maryland attorney general election was held on November 3, 1998, in order to elect the attorney general of Maryland. Democratic nominee and incumbent attorney general J. Joseph Curran Jr. defeated Republican nominee Paul H. Rappaport.

== General election ==
On election day, November 3, 1998, Democratic nominee J. Joseph Curran Jr. won re-election by a margin of 391,225 votes against his opponent Republican nominee Paul H. Rappaport, thereby retaining Democratic control over the office of attorney general. Curran was sworn in for his fourth term on January 3, 1999.

=== Results ===
Maryland Attorney General election, 1998
Party	Candidate	Votes	%
Democratic	J. Joseph Curran Jr. (incumbent)	922,655	63.45
Republican	Paul H. Rappaport	531,430	36.55
Total votes		1,454,085	100.00
Democratic hold			
