= J. Joseph Curran Jr. =

American politician (born 1931)

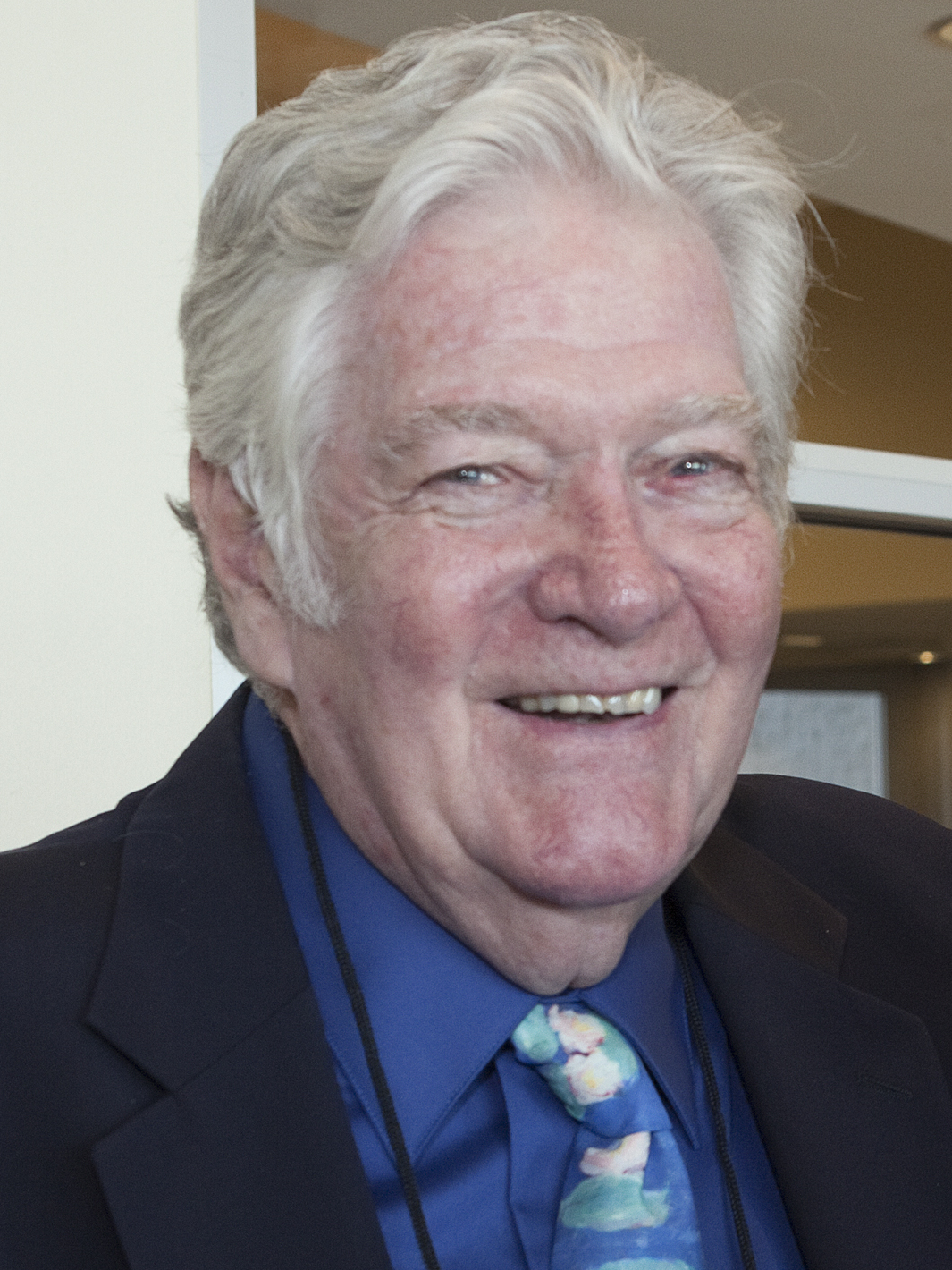
- Curran in 2012

44th Attorney General of Maryland
- In office January 12, 1987 – January 2, 2007
- Governor: Harry Hughes; William Donald Schaefer; Parris Glendening; Bob Ehrlich
- Preceded by: Stephen H. Sachs
- Succeeded by: Doug Gansler

4th Lieutenant Governor of Maryland
- In office January 19, 1983 – January 12, 1987
- Governor: Harry Hughes
- Preceded by: Samuel Bogley
- Succeeded by: Melvin Steinberg

Member of the Maryland Senate
- In office January 2, 1963 – January 12, 1983
- Preceded by: J. Raymond Buffington Jr.
- Succeeded by: John A. Pica Jr.
- Constituency: Baltimore City's 3rd district (1963–1967); 9th district (1967–1975); 43rd district (1975–1982)

Member of the Maryland House of Delegates from Baltimore City's 3rd district
- In office January 7, 1959 – January 2, 1963

Personal details
- Born: John Joseph Curran Jr. July 7, 1931 (age 95) West Palm Beach, Florida, U.S.
- Party: Democratic
- Spouse: Barbara Marie Atkins
- Children: 5, including Katie
- Relatives: Robert W. Curran (brother); Gerald Curran (cousin); Martin O'Malley (son-in-law)
- Education: University of Baltimore (BA, LLB)

Military service
- Allegiance: United States
- Branch/service: United States Air Force
- Years of service: 1951–1955
- Battles/wars: Korean War

John Joseph Curran Jr. (born July 7, 1931) is an American politician and lawyer who served as the 44th attorney general of Maryland from 1987 to 2007, the longest serving elected attorney general in Maryland history. A member of the Democratic Party, he served as the fourth lieutenant governor of Maryland from 1983 to 1987.

Born in Florida and raised in Baltimore, Curran served in the U.S. Air Force during the Korean War before graduating from the University of Baltimore. He began his career as an insurance adjuster before entering into private law practice. Curran was elected to the Maryland House of Delegates in 1958, serving one term before winning election to the Maryland Senate in 1962. From 1967 to 1983, he served as the chair of the Senate Judicial Proceedings Committee, during which he supported gun control and civil rights reforms, and opposed abortion. Curran unsuccessfully ran for the U.S. House of Representatives in 1968, narrowly losing to incumbent George Hyde Fallon in the Democratic primary; and in 1976, losing to Baltimore city councilmember Barbara Mikulski in the Democratic primary.

Curran's daughter, Katie, was a state district court judge from 2001 to 2021. His son-in-law, Martin O'Malley, served as the 61st governor of Maryland from 2007 to 2015.

== Early life and career ==
Curran was born in West Palm Beach, Florida, on July 7, 1931, to Catherine Mary (Clark) and J. Joseph Curran Sr., a member of the Baltimore City Council. He is of Irish descent.

Curran attended parochial schools in Baltimore, graduating from Loyola High School before attending the University of Baltimore. Curran served in the U.S. Air Force from 1951 to 1955, during which he was stationed at an air base in Japan. After returning to the United States, he graduated from the University of Baltimore, earning a Bachelor of Arts degree in 1956 and a Bachelor of Laws degree in 1959. He was admitted to the Maryland State Bar Association in 1959. Curran worked as an insurance adjuster until 1960, when he began working in the private practice of law.

== Early political career ==
=== Maryland House of Delegates ===
Curran first became involved with politics as a member of the Third District Independent Democratic Club, which opposed the Coggins-O'Malley political organization in northeast Baltimore. filed to run for the Maryland House of Delegates in 1958, running on a slate of candidates affiliated with Baltimore mayor Thomas D'Alesandro Jr. He won the election with largest number of votes cast for a House of Delegates candidate in Baltimore. He served a single term in the House, during which he served on the Banking, Insurance and Social Security Committee and the Education Committee. Curran also introduced bills to replace Baltimore's police and traffic court magistrates with an eleven-judge municipal court, establish a special fund to underwrite loans for students' college expenses, and require slot machine businesses to disclose their financing and operations to the state. In November 1959, Curran formed the "Elect Kennedy Club", aimed at supporting U.S. Senator John F. Kennedy at the 1960 Democratic National Convention.

=== Maryland Senate ===
In 1961, Curran announced that he would run for the Maryland Senate in 1962, challenging incumbent state senator J. Raymond Buffington Jr. His candidacy was backed by former Baltimore city solicitor Hugo A. Ricciuti. Curran was expected to place third in the Democratic primary, behind Buffington and Baltimore city councilmember Frank X. Gallagher, but would end up defeating Buffington in an upset. Curran defeated his Republican challenger, former state delegate Samuel A. Culotta, in the general election in November 1962.

Curran was sworn into the Maryland Senate on January 2, 1963. In 1966 and 1967, National States' Rights Party protesters picketed in front of Curran's house over his support for open housing laws. In January 1967, Senate President William S. James named Curran as the chair of the Judicial Proceedings Committee, replacing longtime chair Frederick Malkus, after 21 Democratic state senators presented James with a letter demanding Curran be made the chair of the Judicial Proceedings Committee or they would not vote to re-elect him as president of the Maryland Senate. During his tenure, Curran gained the nickname "Fair Joe" for taking everybody's time in an effort to be fair to every sponsor of every bill that reached his committee. He supported efforts to tighten the state's gun control laws and expand civil rights, including legislation to repeal Maryland's ban on interracial marriage and bills to ban discrimination in housing and public accommodations, Curran led opposition to a bill that would liberalize Maryland's laws on abortion, but later voted for a bill that would provide state funding for abortions.

In June 1978, Baltimore County Executive Ted Venetoulis made an offer to Curran to be his running mate in the 1978 Maryland gubernatorial election. Curran endorsed Lieutenant Governor Blair Lee III for governor in August 1978; after Lee was defeated by former state senator Harry Hughes in the Democratic primary, Curran served as the chair of Hughes's gubernatorial campaign in Baltimore City.

=== Congressional campaigns ===
==== 1968 ====
On January 4, 1968, Curran announced that he would run for the U.S. House of Representatives in Maryland's 4th congressional district, challenging fellow Democrat and incumbent U.S. Representative George Hyde Fallon. He campaigned against the Vietnam War, endorsing a peace plan proposed by Republican presidential candidate Nelson Rockefeller, and criticized the Federal-Aid Highway Act of 1968 and federal welfare programs. Fallon narrowly defeated Curran in the Democratic primary in September 10, 1968, by a margin of 921 votes. Curran conceded to Fallon on September 19, 1968.

==== 1976 ====
In October 1975, after U.S. Representative Paul Sarbanes announced that he would run for U.S. Senate in 1976, Curran announced that he would run for Congress in Maryland's 3rd congressional district. During the Democratic primary, he ran on a platform described by The Baltimore Sun as "slightly to the left of all the other major candidates in the race", which included support for gun control and the decriminalization of marijuana, as well as opposition to the Vietnam War and mandatory minimum sentences for violent crime offenders. Curran was viewed as a strong second place challenger behind Baltimore city councilmember Barbara Mikulski, due to his strong name recognition and ready-formed sources of support. However, his ability to campaign was limited due to the ongoing legislative session, during which his father, who was experiencing heart problems during the campaign, would usually campaign on his behalf. The candidacy of state senator John Carroll Byrnes also cut into Curran's vote total in northeast Baltimore, where about 35,000 of the district's voters resided.

On May 18, 1976, Curran lost the primary, placing a distant second behind Mikulski. Following his defeat, he blamed Byrnes and state delegate Andrew J. Burns Jr., who represented Curran's district and put out a spate of paid workers on Election Day to help Mikulski's candidacy, for his defeat. During the 1978 elections, Curran removed Burns from the 43rd district legislative ticket in favor of Robert J. Birrane, contending he was disloyal, and did not recruit any primary challengers against Byrnes. Burns was renominated by voters in September 1978, with Birrane placing fourth in the Democratic primary.

== Lieutenant Governor of Maryland ==
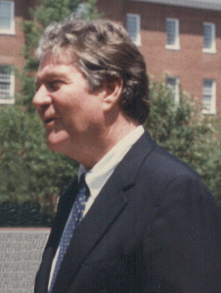
Curran in 1985

In May 1982, after Governor Harry Hughes announced that incumbent lieutenant governor Samuel Bogley would not be his running mate in the 1982 Maryland gubernatorial election, Curran told Hughes that he would accept if Hughes asked him to be his running mate in his re-election campaign. Hughes's shortlist came down to Hughes and Ben Cardin, the speaker of the Maryland House of Delegates; after Cardin withdrew his name from consideration, Hughes called Curran asking him to be his running mate. Hughes officially announced Curran as his pick for lieutenant governor on June 11, 1982. Political observers described Curran as a "neutral choice", as he was largely unknown statewide and did not improve Hughes's standing when asked about a potential running mate in Hughes campaign polls. During his campaign, Curran said that he would pursue adequate funding for education programs, provide exceptional attention to the state's juvenile services, and work with counties to provide support during federal changes. The Hughes-Curran ticket defeated state senator Harry J. McGuirk, who ran with Bogley as his lieutenant governor, in the Democratic primary election in September 1982. The ticket defeated Anne Arundel County executive Robert A. Pascal in the general election on November 2, 1982.

Curran was sworn in as lieutenant governor on January 19, 1983. During his tenure, Curran lobbied for several of the Hughes administration's priority bills in the Maryland General Assembly, including measures to toughen penalties for drunk driving and end circuit court judicial elections. He also led economic development missions to Taiwan, England, West Germany, and Japan.

== Attorney General of Maryland ==
=== Elections ===
==== 1986 ====
1986 Maryland Attorney General Democratic primary election results by county: Curran: 30–40%; 40–50%; 50–60%; Baker: 30–40%; 40–50%; 50–60%; Carey: 30–40%; 40–50%; 50–60%

On June 26, 1985, Curran announced that he would run for attorney general of Maryland in 1986, seeking to succeed Stephen H. Sachs, who unsuccessfully ran for governor. During his campaign, he identified protecting the public from crime and implementing legislation to support efforts to clean up the Chesapeake Bay as the most important duties of the next attorney general. The Baltimore Sun described Curran as the frontrunner in the Democratic primary, during which he ran a low-key campaign that shied away from attempts to generate publicity through campaign events and press conferences, instead opting to meet with environmental and mental health advocacy groups to discuss issues. Curran won the Democratic primary election with 37% of the vote on September 9, 1986, and ran unopposed in the general election.

==== 1990 ====
Curran announced that he would run for a second term as attorney general on September 8, 1989. He ran unopposed in the Democratic primary election and defeated Republican nominee Edward Blanton Jr. in the general election with 64.7% of the vote.

==== 1994 ====
Curran was viewed as a potential candidate in the 1994 Maryland gubernatorial election. However, in September 1993, he announced that he would not run for governor in 1994, opting to instead run for a third term as attorney general. Curran defeated two challengers in the Democratic primary and faced Republican nominee Richard D. Bennett, who served as U.S. Attorney for the District of Maryland from 1991 to 1993, in the general election. Curran's polling lead over Bennett narrowed in the final month of the campaign, with both candidates criticizing their opponent's handling of crime and accusing each other of political wrongdoings and tax irregularities. Curran defeated Bennett in the general election on November 8, 1994, with 54% of the vote.

==== 1998 ====
Curran ran for a fourth term as attorney general in 1998. He ran unopposed in the Democratic primary election and defeated Republican nominee Paul Rappaport in the general election with 63.5% of the vote.

==== 2002 ====
Curran ran for a fifth term as attorney general in 2002. He ran unopposed in the Democratic primary election and defeated Republican nominee Edwin MacVaugh in the general election with 65.2% of the vote.

=== Tenure ===
Curran was sworn in as attorney general on January 12, 1987. During his tenure, Curran gained a reputation as an advocate for consumers. He supported efforts to strengthen Maryland's gun control laws and pursued violations of the state's environmental laws. Curran had a strained relationship with Governor William Donald Schaefer, who opposed Curran's decision to join a nationwide antitrust lawsuit against insurance companies and for his 1988 recommendation that Shapiro & Olander, a law firm with ties to Baltimore mayor Kurt Schmoke, be chosen as bond counsel for the Maryland Stadium Authority.

During the 1988 United States presidential election, Curran served as a co-chair of Massachusetts governor Michael Dukakis's presidential campaign in Maryland. He was a delegate to the 1992, 1996, and 2000 Democratic National Conventions.

On May 8, 2006, Curran announced that he would not run for re-election in 2006. The 2006 election would have taken place concurrently with the 2006 Maryland gubernatorial election, in which Martin O'Malley, Curran's son-in-law, was a leading candidate; Curran denied that he was retiring to avoid a possible conflict of interest between his duties as attorney general and O'Malley's campaign, saying that "there never would have been a conflict" and that those in his office "would do the right thing in any event". He declined to endorse a successor, but confirmed plans to campaign for O'Malley's gubernatorial campaign.

==== High-profile cases ====
The first case Curran argued before the U.S. Supreme Court was Maryland v. Craig. In July 1989, the Maryland Court of Appeals overturned the conviction of Sandra A. Craig, a Howard County daycare center owner who sexually molested a girl at the daycare from age 4 to 6, ruling that the trial court violated the Sixth Amendment to the United States Constitution by allowing the child to testify via the live television screen in the courtroom. Curran appealed this ruling to the U.S. Supreme Court, which agreed in January 1990 to hear arguments in the case. In June 1990, the Supreme Court overturned the Maryland Court of Appeals' ruling in a 5–4 decision, reinstating the conviction and holding that the Confrontation Clause did not bar the use of one-way closed-circuit television to present testimony by an alleged child sex abuse victim.

In November 1994, Republican gubernatorial nominee Ellen Sauerbrey filed a lawsuit seeking to overturn the results of the 1994 Maryland gubernatorial election after her campaign released an investigative report alleging that 4,774 incarcerated individuals, 37 dead voters, 71 individuals who provided elections officials with addresses of vacant buildings, 20 unregistered voters, and 84 voters who had voted twice. Curran sought dismissal of the lawsuit, saying that the Constitution of Maryland gave the Maryland House of Delegates exclusive jurisdiction over deciding the outcome of a disputed gubernatorial election. Anne Arundel County circuit court judge Raymond G. Thieme Jr. rejected Sauerbrey's claims, saying that she provided "no clear and convincing" proof that the procedural errors in the election rose to the level of fraud, that the "purity of the election" was materially affected, or that Democratic gubernatorial nominee Parris Glendening's victory was improperly gained. In February 1995, Curran issued a 41-page report on the 1994 elections, affirming that the election was "fair and honest" while recommending 10 election reforms to address issues raised by Sauerbrey's campaign in its lawsuit. These proposed reforms included setting up a statewide computerized voter registration system, improvements to the Maryland State Board of Elections' handling and processing of absentee ballots, and training for election judges to ask voters for their addresses or birth dates.

Curran argued before the U.S. Supreme Court in Maryland v. Wilson. In June 1994, Maryland state trooper David Hughes stopped a car for speeding along Interstate 95, questioning the driver and then ordering Jerry Lee Wilson, a passenger, out of the car. Wilson was arrested and charged with possession with intent to distribute cocaine after a bag of crack cocaine fell to the ground as he walked to the trooper's cruiser. In September 1995, the Maryland Court of Special Appeals ruled that the driver of the vehicle could have been ordered out of the car, but not the passenger, unless the passenger had a weapon and posed a threat. Curran appealed the ruling to the Supreme Court, which agreed in June 1996 to hear arguments in the case. In February 1997, the Supreme Court overturned the Court of Special Appeals' ruling in a 7–2 decision, holding that officers could order passengers out a car during a traffic stop.

==== Environment ====
In May 1991, Curran testified before the U.S. House Subcommittee on Transportation and Hazardous Materials urging lawmakers to support the Federal Facilities Compliance Act, which would require the federal government to comply with the same environmental standards that private citizens, corporations, and state and local governments must comply with.

During the 1992 legislative session, the Maryland General Assembly passed a bill imposing a $100 surcharge on the purchase of vehicles that get fewer than 21 miles per a gallon of fuel and providing $50 rebates to purchasers of cars that get better than 35 miles per gallon. In June 1992, the National Highway Traffic Safety Administration wrote to Curran saying that the new tax should be rescinded, saying that the Maryland law was at odds with a federal statute that prohibits states from setting different fuel economy standards. In response, Curran published a 10-page opinion saying that he would defend the law if the General Assembly adjusts the law during the 1993 legislative session to find a way to notify consumers without mentioning federal fuel economy ratings, which he said would allow the state to get around "the feds". A bill to do so was introduced during the 1993 legislative session, but died in committee.

==== Gun control ====
Curran supported the Maryland Court of Appeals's 1985 decision in Kelley v. R.G. Industries, which held that manufacturers of Saturday night special handguns could be held liable for damages resulting from the illegal use of the weapon, saying that it discouraged special handgun manufacturers from distributing the weapons in Maryland. However, during the 1987 legislative session, he opposed a bill that would allow victims of Saturday night special handguns to sue the guns' makers and distributors for damages. During the 1988 legislative session, Curran led negotiations with several state legislators that led to a compromise gun control bill that banned the sale of Saturday night specials and plastic handguns, but removed lawsuit liability for gun manufacturers. The gun control bill was signed into law by Governor William Donald Schaefer in May 1988, after which pro-gun groups, including the National Rifle Association, successfully petitioned the bill to a referendum. Maryland voters approved the gun law on November 8, 1988, with 58 percent of voters approving the measure.

In March 1991, Curran criticized a set of anti-crime proposals proposed by President George H. W. Bush, saying that while the proposals might have some success in Congress due to Bush's popularity, the proposal fell short by not including curbs on the sale and manufacture of automatic assault weapons. In September 1992, he called on Congress to pass the Brady Handgun Violence Prevention Act, which would require gun buyers to wait five days before obtaining a handgun. In August 1994, after the U.S. House of Representatives rejected President Bill Clinton's crime bill and assault weapons ban, Curran held a press conference calling on the three Republicans in Maryland's congressional delegation—Helen Delich Bentley, Wayne Gilchrest, and Roscoe Bartlett—to change their votes to pass the bill.

In February 1995, Curran encouraged Baltimore and Prince George's County to consider creating police patrols to seize illegal firearms by searching suspicious pedestrians and motorists in high-crime areas. Baltimore police commissioner Thomas C. Frazier rejected Curran's proposal, after which Baltimore County police chief Michael Gambrill announced that his department would create a firearms unit to enforce gun laws.

In September 1995, Curran issued an opinion allowing Baltimore to set its own gun control laws, saying that Maryland's "home rule" provisions against local laws did not apply to Baltimore handguns.

In October 1999, Curran issued a 58-page report, "A Farewell to Arms", in which he laid out several proposals to state and federal regulations aimed at restricting gun ownership with the long-term goal of banning all privately owned handguns.

==== Social issues ====
In June 1991, Curran supported the U.S. Supreme Court's ruling in Payne v. Tennessee, which overturned the Court's decision in Booth v. Maryland by allowing victim impact statements to be admitted during the sentencing phase of a trial.

In June 1992, Curran, hoping to defuse potential criticism over how Question 6 was worded on the 1992 general election ballot, sent drafts of the referendum language to both pro-choice and pro-life groups. After receiving feedback, he rewrote the question to use "less cryptic" language. The ballot language was revised for a third and final time before Curran submitted it to the Maryland Secretary of State, who approved the language to appear on the ballot. The Vote kNOw Coalition, which opposed abortion, subsequently filed a lawsuit challenging the referendum language, which was upheld by the Maryland Court of Appeals in August 1992.

During the 1993 legislative session, Curran supported a proposal to create a needle exchange program to prevent the spread of HIV/AIDS.

In September 1993, Curran proposed legislation to outlaw physician-assisted suicide, issuing a 15-page opinion urging legislators to take action on the issue to avoid legal questions raised by the activities of Michigan pathologist Jack Kevorkian. At the same time, he supported Maryland's right to die law, which allowed people to reject medical treatment under certain circumstances.

==== Sports stadiums ====
In April 1987, after Governor Schaefer signed into law a bill authorizing the Maryland Stadium Authority to build two sports stadiums at Camden Yards, opponents launched a petition drive in attempt to force a statewide referendum on the new stadiums during the 1988 elections, threatening the governor's drive to attract a football team to Baltimore. In response, Curran issued a formal opinion saying that the petitions were powerless to stop the stadium proposal because the bill authorizing the project was "an appropriation for maintaining the state government" and state law does not allow appropriation measures to be petitioned to the ballot. Curran's opinion initiated a legal battle that ended in September 1987, with the Maryland Court of Appeals ruling that the petition drive was invalid, allowing for work on the new stadiums to begin.

In January 1996, Curran issued a 12-page opinion rejecting a legal challenge to the state's ability to spend $200 million to build a football stadium in Baltimore without the legislature's approval, citing the 1987 stadiums law.

== Personal life ==
Curran met his future wife, Barbara Marie Atkins, while attending the University of Baltimore Law School. Together, they had five children. Curran is a Catholic.

Curran's brothers, Martin and Robert, served on the Baltimore City Council from 1977 to 1995 and from 1995 to 2016, respectively. His cousin, Gerald, was a member of the Maryland House of Delegates from 1967 to 1998, and briefly ran for Curran's seat in the Maryland Senate in 1982 before withdrawing to run for re-election as delegate. Curran's youngest daughter, Katie, was a state district court judge from 2001 to 2021 and is married to former Maryland governor Martin O'Malley. In the spring of 1990, while O'Malley was dating Katie, Curran encouraged O'Malley to run for state senate against incumbent state senator John A. Pica; O'Malley narrowly lost to Pica in the Democratic primary.

In April 1992, Curran wrote to state lawmakers revealing that he had been diagnosed with prostate cancer, but that his diagnosis was early and he was able to get surgery to remove his cancer before it spread to surrounding tissues.

Political offices
Preceded by Samuel W. Bogley	Lieutenant Governor of Maryland; 1983–1987	Succeeded by Melvin A. Steinberg
Legal offices
Preceded by Stephen H. Sachs	Attorney General of Maryland; 1987–2007	Succeeded by Doug Gansler
