= Judy Agnew =

Second Lady of the United States from 1969 to 1973

- Official portrait, 1969

Second Lady of the United States
- In role January 20, 1969 – October 10, 1973
- Vice President: Spiro Agnew
- Preceded by: Muriel Humphrey
- Succeeded by: Betty Ford

First Lady of Maryland
- In role January 25, 1967 – January 7, 1969
- Governor: Spiro Agnew
- Preceded by: Helen Gibson
- Succeeded by: Barbara Mandel

Personal details
- Born: Elinor Isabel Judefind; April 23, 1921 Baltimore, Maryland, U.S.
- Died: June 20, 2012 (aged 91) Rancho Mirage, California, U.S.
- Resting place: Dulaney Valley Memorial Gardens
- Party: Republican
- Spouse: Spiro Agnew (m. 1942; died 1996)
- Children: 4

Elinor Isabel "Judy" Agnew (née Judefind; April 23, 1921 – June 20, 2012) was the second lady of the United States from 1969 to 1973. She was the wife of the 39th vice president of the United States, Spiro Agnew, who had previously served as Governor of Maryland and Baltimore County Executive. Although Judy Agnew attempted to avoid political discussion during her tenure as second lady, preferring to cultivate her image primarily as a wife and mother, her dismissive remarks about the women's liberation movement were quoted by media.

== Early life ==
Born Elinor Isabel Judefind in Baltimore, Maryland, to parents of French–German descent, Agnew was daughter of William Lee Judefind, a chemist, and his wife, the former Ruth Elinor Schafer. Her paternal grandfather was a Methodist minister.

Agnew confessed in an interview with Parade magazine that her father had believed college education to be wasted on women, so in lieu of attending college, Agnew worked as a filing clerk. While working at the Maryland Casualty Company, she encountered Spiro Agnew. They had previously attended the same high school. After meeting again at the Maryland Casualty Company, the couple went to a movie on their first date together, and bought chocolate milkshakes afterward. Four months later, they became engaged.

== Marriage to Spiro Agnew ==
She married Agnew on May 27, 1942, in Baltimore; he had graduated from Army Officer Candidate School two days earlier. They had four children: Pamela Lee Agnew (Mrs. Robert E. DeHaven), James Rand Agnew, Susan Scott Agnew (Mrs. Colin Neilson Macindoe), and Elinor Kimberly Agnew.

While living in Annapolis with her husband and their four children, Agnew served as the president of her local PTA, and volunteered as both an assistant Girl Scout troop leader and a board member of the Kiwanis Club women's auxiliary. An Episcopalian, she and her family belonged to St. Anne's Episcopal Church in Annapolis. When speaking to the press, Agnew spoke in what she called a "Baltimorese" accent. She became known by the local press for serving cocktails in glass peanut butter jars, although she once publicly attempted to refute this claim. She was the First Lady of Maryland from January 1967 to January 1969.

== Second Lady of the United States ==
Reportedly, Agnew's reaction to Richard Nixon naming her husband as his running mate was a tearful, "can you get out of it?" When asked by the press what she thought of her husband's new position, she told several publications that she was "trying to keep the ashtrays clean."

In 1969, Agnew hosted a dinner at the White House for seventy-five female reporters. Her husband played piano for the guests, but left before the meal was served.

Agnew preferred to avoid political conversations in the press while serving as Second Lady. In 1967, Agnew told The Evening Sun, "I'll still make brief remarks, at luncheons and teas and so on, but I'm not a speech maker. I'm not a real campaigner." In 1970, she told Parade magazine, "I stay out of the political end of it. When people ask what I majored in, I proudly tell them 'I majored in marriage.'" However, Agnew did make several political statements while her husband was in office. In 1971, she was quoted as calling feminists "silly", stating that she was already liberated. McCall's magazine published a letter from a feminist reader in response to Agnew's comments, saying she had "set Women's Lib back a hundred years".

Agnew also told The New York Times that she had "no use" for hippies, although she admitted that she did not know any.

In October 1971, Agnew and her husband were guests of the 2,500-year celebration of the Persian Empire held in Persepolis and hosted by the last Shah of Iran. Security was an issue and the couple with their 11 Secret Service agents chose to travel within Iran by helicopter rather than a 45-minute car ride. The Agnews also dined alone in their quarters rather than join informal entertainment with the Shah.

In 1973, Spiro Agnew resigned from his position as Vice President of the United States, pleading nolo contendere to charges of income tax evasion. He was charged with having reported a joint income of $26,099 for both him and his wife in 1967, although their correct income had been $55,599. On the day of her husband's resignation, Judy Agnew broke down at a luncheon and cried among her guests.

== Later life ==
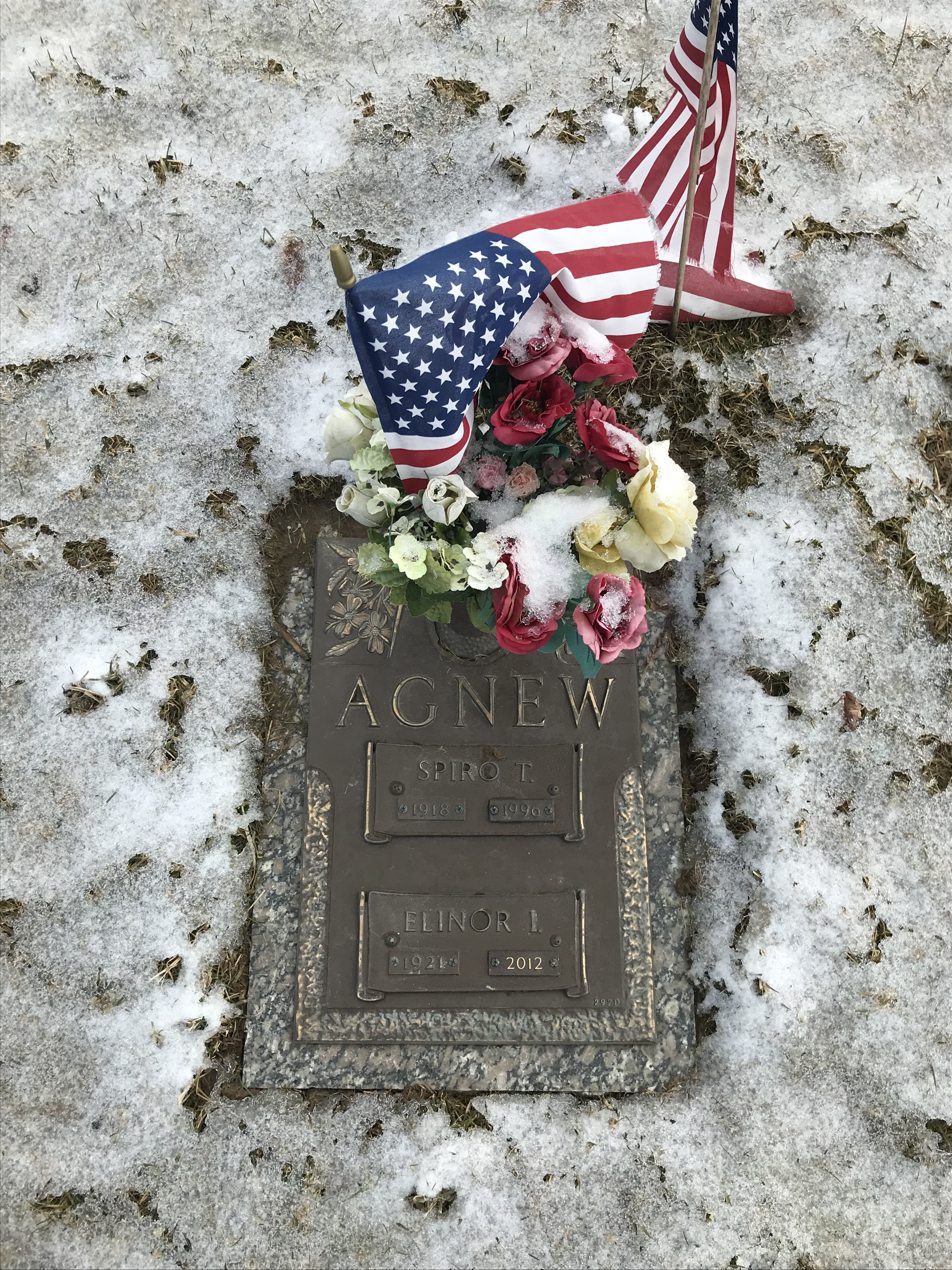
Gravesite of Spiro and Judy Agnew at Dulaney Valley Memorial Gardens in Timonium, Maryland

On September 16, 1996, Spiro Agnew collapsed and died the next day from acute undiagnosed leukemia at the age of 77. Judy outlived him by almost 16 years and died on June 20, 2012, in Rancho Mirage, California, at the age of 91. Her daughter, Susan, stated that her mother's health had been deteriorating since 2005 and she died from pneumonia. She is buried next to husband Spiro at the Dulaney Valley Memorial Gardens.

Honorary titles
Preceded by Helen Gibson	First Lady of Maryland; 1967–1969	Succeeded by Barbara Mandel
Preceded by Muriel Humphrey	Second Lady of the United States; 1969–1973	Vacant Title next held by Betty Ford
