= Katie O'Malley =

American jurist (born 1962)

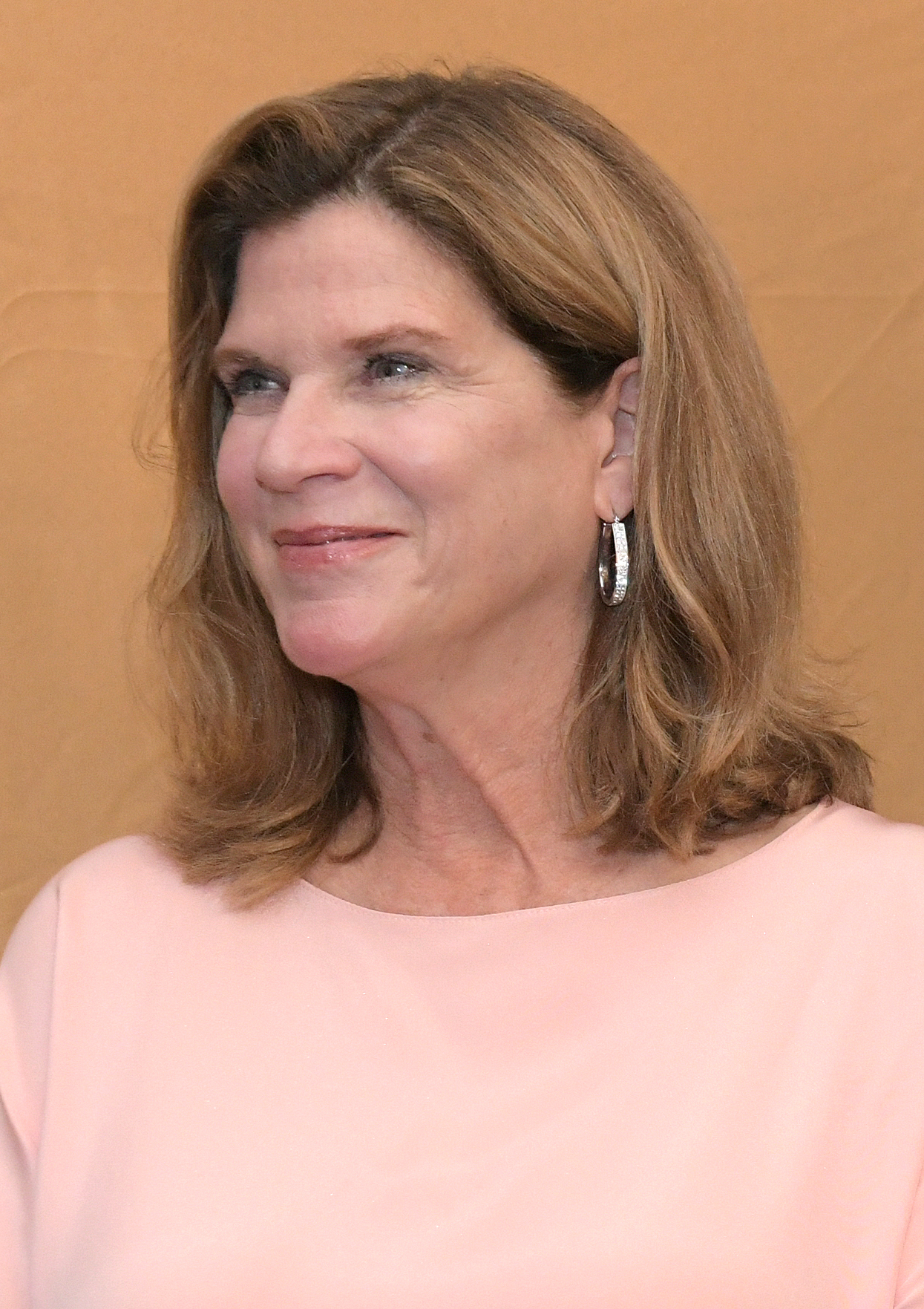
- O'Malley in 2023

First Lady of Maryland
- In role January 17, 2007 – January 21, 2015
- Governor: Martin O'Malley
- Preceded by: Kendel Ehrlich
- Succeeded by: Yumi Hogan

Associate Judge of the Maryland District Court for District 1, Baltimore City
- In office August 16, 2001 – October 2021
- Appointed by: Parris Glendening

First Lady of Baltimore
- In role December 7, 1999 – January 17, 2007
- Mayor: Martin O'Malley
- Preceded by: Patricia Schmoke
- Succeeded by: Kent Blake (2010)

Personal details
- Born: Catherine Curran; August 18, 1962 (age 64) Baltimore, Maryland, U.S.
- Party: Democratic
- Spouse: Martin O'Malley (m. 1990)
- Children: 4
- Relatives: J. Joseph Curran Jr. (father)
- Education: Towson University (BS); University of Baltimore (JD)

Catherine Curran O'Malley (born August 18, 1962) is an American jurist who served as a Baltimore City District Court judge. She is married to Martin O'Malley, a former governor of Maryland and mayor of Baltimore, and a 2016 presidential candidate. She was an unsuccessful candidate for Maryland Attorney General in the 2022 election.

== Early life and education ==
O'Malley is the daughter of Barbara Marie (née Atkins) and former Maryland Attorney General J. Joseph Curran Jr. A native of Baltimore, she attended Notre Dame Preparatory School. O'Malley earned a Bachelor of Arts degree from Towson University and a Juris Doctor from the University of Baltimore School of Law.

== Career ==
Upon graduation from law school in 1991, O'Malley accepted a job as an assistant state's attorney in Baltimore County, serving in that office until her appointment as a judge. In the state's attorney's office, she prosecuted homicides and other violent felonies before serving as the chief of the white collar/economic crimes unit from 1999 to 2001. On August 16, 2001, then-Governor Parris Glendening appointed her to a 10-year term, expiring in 2011, as an Associate Judge for the First District Court of Maryland, encompassing the city of Baltimore. She was re-appointed to additional 10-year terms in both 2011 and in 2021.

O'Malley became First Lady of Maryland in January 2007 when her husband took office as governor. As a judge, she was prohibited by the judicial code of conduct from joining her husband in partisan campaign events. Martin O'Malley's governorship ended in January 2015.

As a judge, O'Malley was a leader on addressing domestic violence through the court system and with protective orders. She also served on the steering committee of the Maryland/Leningrad Region Rule of Law Partnership, a local host organization of the Open World Leadership Center. In her combined role as first lady, she welcomed judges' delegations annually from Saint Petersburg, Russia, to Government House for receptions and working dinners. In February 2008, O'Malley and others led a reciprocal visit to Saint Petersburg to work on domestic-violence prevention and prosecution. In 2019, O'Malley joined the Open World Leadership Center Board of Trustees, supporting the organization's mission of promoting the rule of law and democratic values around the globe.

In October 2021, after Maryland Attorney General Brian Frosh announced he would not seek a third term, O'Malley announced she would be retiring as a judge, fueling speculation that she would run for Maryland Attorney General. Her final day as a judge was October 29, 2021. If elected, she would have held the same office that her father held for 20 years. She announced her candidacy in the 2022 Maryland Attorney General election on December 1, 2021. On July 19, 2022, O'Malley lost the Democratic primary to U.S. Congressman Anthony Brown, her husband's former running mate and Lieutenant Governor.

In January 2024, the Women's Law Center of Maryland named O'Malley as its executive director.

== Personal life ==
While attending law school, she met University of Maryland law student Martin O'Malley, and they wed in 1990. She and her husband have four children.

Honorary titles
Preceded by Kendel Ehrlich	First Lady of Maryland; 2007–2015	Succeeded by Yumi Hogan
