= Stephen H. Sachs =

American lawyer and politician (1934–2022)

- Sachs in November 1989

40th Attorney General of Maryland
- In office 1979–1987
- Governor: Harry Hughes
- Preceded by: George A. Nilson
- Succeeded by: J. Joseph Curran Jr.

United States Attorney for the District of Maryland
- In office June 5, 1967 – June 1, 1970
- President: Lyndon B. Johnson; Richard Nixon
- Preceded by: Thomas J. Kenney
- Succeeded by: George Beall

Personal details
- Born: Stephen Howard Sachs; January 31, 1934 Baltimore, Maryland, U.S.
- Died: January 12, 2022 (aged 87) Baltimore, Maryland, U.S.
- Party: Democratic
- Education: Haverford College (BA); Yale University (LLB)

Stephen Howard Sachs (January 31, 1934 – January 12, 2022) was an American lawyer and politician in the state of Maryland. He served as the Attorney General of Maryland from 1979 to 1987. He was noted for prosecuting the Catonsville Nine in 1968.

== Early life and education ==
Sachs was born in Baltimore on January 31, 1934. His father, Leon, worked as a labor arbitrator and taught political science at Johns Hopkins University; his mother, Shirley (Blum), was a housewife. His family was Jewish, with his father serving as director of the Baltimore Jewish Council for 34 years. Sachs attended Friends School of Baltimore, graduating in 1950. He then studied at Haverford College, obtaining a bachelor's degree in 1954. He went on to serve in the US Army from 1955 to 1957, before being awarded a Fulbright scholarship to study at the University of Oxford. Sachs graduated from Yale Law School in 1960 and was admitted to the Maryland Bar that year, before being called to the Supreme Court Bar five years later.

== Career ==
=== Attorney ===
Sachs clerked for Henry White Edgerton of the US Court of Appeals for the District of Columbia Circuit from 1960 to 1961. He was subsequently appointed as an assistant US attorney by Robert F. Kennedy and served in that role until 1965. That year, he became an associate and partner in Tydings, Rosenberg & Gallagher, a local law firm. He acted concurrently as a reporter to the Committee on State Finance and Taxation for the Maryland Constitutional Convention Commission.

Sachs was appointed United States Attorney for the District of Maryland in 1967, and acted in that capacity until 1970. He focused on prosecuting cases related to white-collar crime and public corruption. For instance, he prosecuted Thomas Francis Johnson for accepting money from the state's savings and loan industry. Sachs notably prosecuted the Catonsville Nine in 1968, after the group of activists attacked the Selective Service office in Catonsville, Maryland, to obliterate draft records. They were ultimately found guilty of destroying government property by a federal court jury half a year later. On the fiftieth anniversary of the incident, Sachs wrote that he was of the opinion that the nine were "brave" individuals "who acted out of a conviction that the war in Vietnam was profoundly evil". However, he maintained that their "conduct … offends both the rule of law and a fundamental tenet of the American democracy".

Sachs returned to private practice in 1970. During the Watergate scandal, he represented the former acting FBI director L. Patrick Gray. He was also a faculty member at the University of Maryland Francis King Carey School of Law from 1969 to 1976, teaching criminal procedure and trial practice.

=== Politics ===
Sachs was elected the 40th Attorney General of Maryland in 1978, and was reelected in 1982. He ran as a reformist candidate who would be independent of the Democratic Party establishment. He vowed to be the "people’s lawyer" rather than be accountable to the governor (as was the practice up to that time). He was credited with modernizing the office of attorney general during his tenure. One of his successors, Brian Frosh, recalled how Sachs declined to defend Maryland's practice of warehousing individuals with mental health disorders, resulting in their release. He was also remembered for being a staunch advocate for civil rights and electoral reform.

Sachs also was very critical of former U.S. Vice President Spiro Agnew, who had resigned as vice president in 1973 and later, as a result of a civil lawsuit, was ordered to make restitution payments of $268,482 to the state of Maryland to cover bribes he was accused of collecting on highway contracts when he had been Baltimore County executive and continuing as governor and vice president. Agnew had pleaded no contest to a single charge that he had evaded federal income taxes on the bribes. Sachs had been Maryland's attorney general at the time of Agnew's restitution payment. "Do I feel sorry for Agnew? Absolutely not," Sachs told the Los Angeles Times in April 1989. "He is one of the luckiest men of his generation. Agnew's plea bargain was the greatest deal since the Lord spared Isaac on the mountaintop."

Sachs was an unsuccessful candidate in the 1986 Maryland gubernatorial primary with Parren Mitchell as his running mate, losing to eventual general election winner William Donald Schaefer.

=== Later career ===
Sachs was a partner in the firm of Wilmer Cutler Pickering Hale and Dorr (aka WilmerHale) from 1987 until his retirement in 1999. In 1989 and 1990 Sachs represented Dr. Elizabeth Morgan in a well-publicized international child custody case. In 1999 Sachs was an attorney representing Interior Secretary Bruce Babbitt in the investigation of allegations that Babbitt lied to Congress.

In 2008, Governor Martin O'Malley appointed Sachs to head an independent review of Maryland State Police infiltration of activist groups that were acting lawfully.

== Personal life ==
Sachs was married to Sheila Kleinman Sachs for 58 years until her death in April 2019. She was a divorce attorney and sat on the Baltimore City School Board from 1974 to 1978. Together they had two children: Leon and Elisabeth. He died on the morning of January 12, 2022, at his home in Roland Park, Baltimore. He was 87, and suffered from a brief illness in the weeks leading up to his death.

== See also ==
- List of Jewish American jurists

Legal offices
Preceded by George A. Nilson	Attorney General of Maryland; 1979–1987	Succeeded by J. Joseph Curran, Jr.
