= 1966 Maryland Attorney General election =

- November 8, 1966

Nominee	Francis B. Burch	William O. Doub
Party	Democratic	Republican
Popular vote	530,647	268,279
Percentage	66.42%	33.58%
- County results Burch: 50–60% 60–70% 70–80% Doub: 50–60% 60–70%
Attorney General before election
Robert C. Murphy (Acting)
Democratic
Elected Attorney General
Francis B. Burch
Democratic

The 1966 Maryland attorney general election was held on November 8, 1966, in order to elect the attorney general of Maryland. Democratic nominee Francis B. Burch defeated Republican nominee William O. Doub.

== General election ==
On election day, November 8, 1966, Democratic nominee Francis B. Burch won the election by a margin of 262,368 votes against his opponent Republican nominee William O. Doub, thereby retaining Democratic control over the office of attorney general. Burch was sworn in as the 40th attorney general of Maryland on January 3, 1967.

=== Results ===
Maryland Attorney General election, 1966
Party	Candidate	Votes	%
Democratic	Francis B. Burch	530,647	66.42
Republican	William O. Doub	268,279	33.58
Total votes		798,926	100.00
Democratic hold			
