= Isabel Mercedes Cumming =

Baltimore City Inspector General
- Incumbent
- Assumed office January 27, 2018

Personal details
- Born: 1961 or 1962 (age 64–65)
- Children: 4; including Joey Jett
- Education: James Madison University; University of Baltimore

Isabel Mercedes Cumming (born 1961/1962) is an American auditor and lawyer serving as Baltimore City's inspector general since 2018. She was previously an assistant state's attorney.

== Early life and education ==
Cumming was born in 1961 or 1962. Her father is from Canada and her mother's family was from Barceloneta, Puerto Rico. She spent her childhood holidays and summers in Puerto Rico. She was raised speaking Spanish but does not speak the language fluently. Cumming completed a bachelor's degree in accounting at James Madison University where she was the Student Government President. She earned a M.B.A. and J.D. with honors from the University of Baltimore.

== Career ==
In the mid-1980s, Cumming worked as an accountant and auditor. In the 1990s, she shifted to law and specialized in prosecuting economic crimes. As an assistant state prosecutor in Baltimore, she prosecuted white-collar crime including former comptroller Jacqueline McLean who was indicted for paying $25,000 to a nonexistent employee and misusing her position to obtain a permit.. Later Cumming worked in the Baltimore City States Attorney's Office as assistant state attorney with Ivan Bates.. Cumming then worked for seven years in Prince George's County, Maryland under Glenn Ivey where she started the first mortgage fraud unit in the United States. She was named Certified Fraud Examiner of the Year in 2006 and was the First Maryland CFE of the Year in 2004. She also headed the economic crimes and police misconduct division. The following six years (2012 -2018), she was the Deputy inspector general of Investigations (IG) for the Washington Metropolitan Area Transit Authority.

In January 2018, Cumming was hired by Baltimore City solicitor Andre M. Davis. She took office on January 27, 2018. Cumming is the first woman and Latina to hold the position. After the 2018 Maryland elections in November, her office's independence from the mayor's office expanded and her position became a six-year term. By September 2020, Cumming had increased the diversity of the IG's office by employing 17 staff members including seven women and 12 people of color. She reported that the office had identified over $4.5 million in taxpayer savings and financial waste during her time in the role. Her office issued multiple reports on wasteful spending, cost overruns, wage theft, and vendors failing to meet contracts. Subjects of early reports during her tenure included the city human resources department and the Baltimore Department of Transportation. In 2020, Her office released a joint report with Baltimore County IG Kelly Madigan finding the city and county lost millions in water and sewer revenue despite spending more than $133 million. Tens of thousands of digital water meters were not fully functional.

In November 2020, she became head of the Baltimore Board of Ethics. Cumming's added a Spanish version of the annual IG report. From 2020 to 2021, her office investigated state's attorney Marilyn Mosby at Mosby's request amid media allegations regarding foreign travel and private companies formed while she was in office. Portions of her report were referred to federal investigators and Mosby was later indicted. Cumming escorted federal investigators into Baltimore City Hall when they visited council president Nick Mosby in March 2021. Mosby's attorneys alleged inaccuracies. Mosby was convicted by two Federal juries of perjury.

The Baltimore chapter of the NAACP questioned Cumming's objectively and suggested she unfairly targeted Black officials and vendors. She rejected the claims and stated she was independent, not motivated by politics or race. Cummings was elected the second vice president of the Association of Inspectors General in November 2021. Her tenure began in January 2022. She was elected First Vice President in 2024 and is currently in her third term as the First Vice President.

In 2024, reports of inadequate heat protections for Baltimore Department of Public Works (DPW) laborers, including broken equipment, non-functioning HVAC, trucks without air conditioning, and locked supplies. DPW employee Ronald Silver II died of heat-related causes on August 2, 2024. Cumming shared that conditions had worsened since a 2019 review by her office. The OIG made six different DPW reports. She testified before the City Council in support of reforms and promoted the testimony on social media.. The conditional improved and the workers received a 19% increase.

In August 2024, Cumming's formally requested the oversight board for a second six-year term. In 2026, on January 24, 2026, the Law Deaprtment stopped the access to the Office of the Inspector General without notice to the Board or Cumming with a press release. Cumming went to her Board and asked to sue the City to return the access. In April 2026 after a court win, she faced backlash and issued an apology following her social media post of a video of her office which had an AI-generated image of mayor Brandon Scott labeled by Brandon Scott's Chief of Staff as racist. Allies of Cumming and the actual creator of the video and image called the allegations politically motivated and not racist..

In September 2026, after several legal battles all won by Cumming's pro-bono team over the City Law Department, the access was restored to the Office of the Inspector General. The case is pending appeal by the City.

== Personal life ==
Cumming is married and has four children including skateboarder Joey Jett.
