= 1970 Maryland Attorney General election =

- November 3, 1970

Nominee	Francis B. Burch	Thomas M. Anderson Jr.
Party	Democratic	Republican
Popular vote	522,663	334,904
Percentage	60.95%	39.05%
- County results Burch: 50–60% 60–70% 70–80% Anderson: 50–60%
Attorney General before election
Francis B. Burch
Democratic
Elected Attorney General
Francis B. Burch
Democratic

The 1970 Maryland attorney general election was held on November 3, 1970, in order to elect the attorney general of Maryland. Democratic nominee and incumbent attorney general Francis B. Burch defeated Republican nominee and incumbent member of the Maryland Senate Thomas M. Anderson Jr.

== General election ==
On election day, November 3, 1970, Democratic nominee Francis B. Burch won re-election by a margin of 187,759 votes against his opponent Republican nominee Thomas M. Anderson Jr., thereby retaining Democratic control over the office of attorney general. Burch was sworn in for his second term on January 3, 1971.

=== Results ===
Maryland Attorney General election, 1970
Party	Candidate	Votes	%
Democratic	Francis B. Burch (incumbent)	522,663	60.95
Republican	Thomas M. Anderson Jr.	334,904	39.05
Total votes		857,567	100.00
Democratic hold			
