= 1974 Maryland Attorney General election =

- November 5, 1974
Nominee	Francis B. Burch
Party	Democratic
Popular vote	589,632
Percentage	100.00%
- County results Burch: 90–100%
Attorney General before election
Francis B. Burch
Democratic
Elected Attorney General
Francis B. Burch
Democratic

The 1974 Maryland attorney general election was held on November 5, 1974, in order to elect the attorney general of Maryland. Democratic nominee and incumbent attorney general Francis B. Burch won re-election as he ran unopposed.

== General election ==
On election day, November 5, 1974, Democratic nominee Francis B. Burch won re-election as he ran unopposed, thereby retaining Democratic control over the office of attorney general. Burch was sworn in for his third term on January 3, 1975.

=== Results ===
Maryland Attorney General election, 1974
Party	Candidate	Votes	%
Democratic	Francis B. Burch (incumbent)	589,632	100.00
Total votes		589,632	100.00
Democratic hold			
