= Andrew K. Syester =

American lawyer and politician (1828–1891)

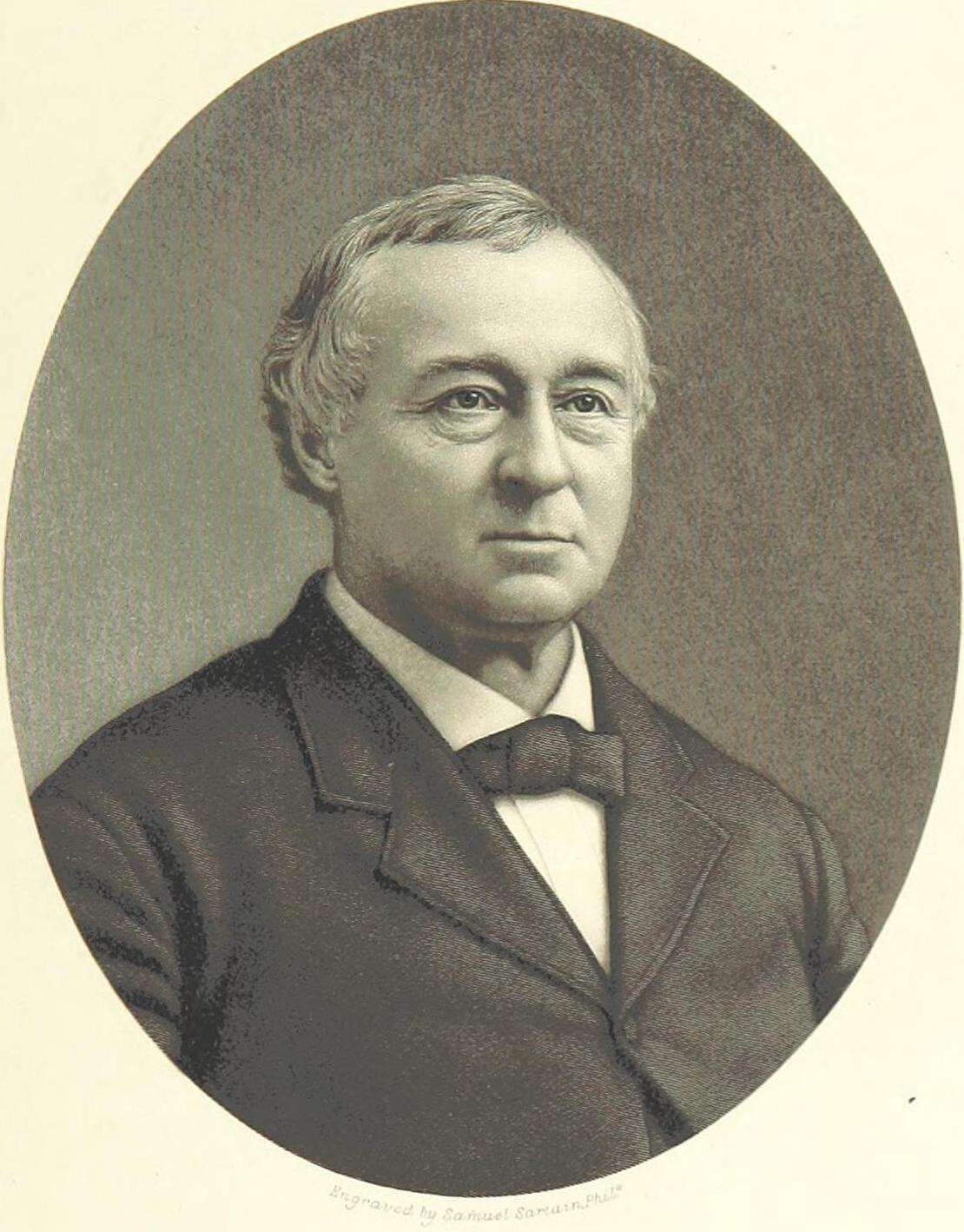
- Engraving of Syester in an 1882 publication

Attorney General of Maryland
- In office 1871–1875
- Governor: Oden Bowie; William Pinkney Whyte
- Preceded by: Isaac Dashiell Jones
- Succeeded by: Charles J. M. Gwinn

Personal details
- Born: March 11, 1828 Berkeley County, Virginia, U.S.
- Died: March 25, 1891 (aged 63) Hagerstown, Maryland, U.S.
- Resting place: Rose Hill Cemetery
- Party: Democratic (from 1859)
- Other political affiliations: Whig (before 1855); Know-Nothing (1855–1859)
- Spouse: Catharine Harry
- Children: 6
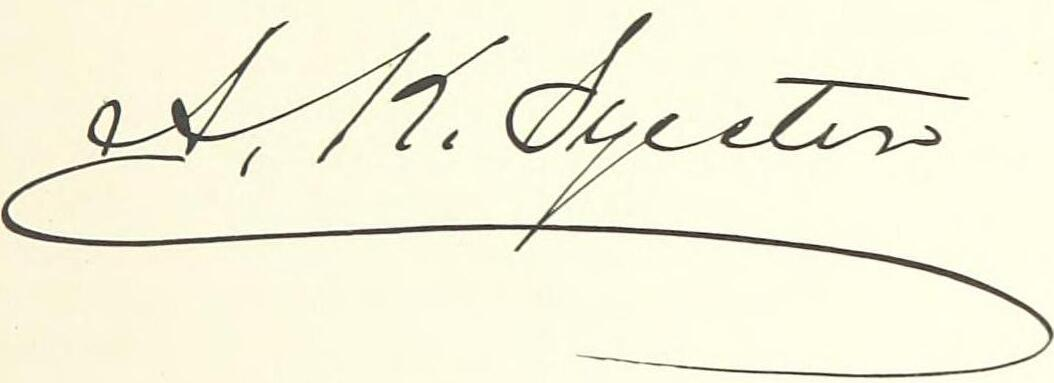
- Signature

Andrew Kershner Syester (March 11, 1828 – March 25, 1891) was a lawyer and politician in Maryland, known for his roles in various legal and political positions throughout the 19th century. Born in Berkeley County, Virginia (modern day West Virginia), his career included terms as Attorney General of Maryland and associate judge of the Fourth Judicial Circuit.

== Early life and education ==
Born to Daniel Syester and Sarah (Moudy) Syester, Andrew K. Syester pursued an education that led him into law. He attended Hagerstown Academy and then Marshall College in Mercersburg, Pennsylvania, graduating in 1849. Following his studies, he apprenticed in law under several practitioners, which culminated in his admission to the Washington County bar in 1853.

== Personal life ==
Syester married Catharine G. Harry in 1852. The couple had six children. They lived in Hagerstown, Washington County, where Syester also conducted much of his professional work.

== Career ==
=== Legal and political career ===
Syester's career began with a clerkship in the Maryland House of Delegates in 1850. He later practiced law, eventually forming a partnership with A.C. Bond. Over time, Syester's political affiliations shifted, reflecting the era's volatile political landscape. Initially a Whig, he later joined the American or Know-Nothing party and ultimately became a Democrat around the Civil War.

His political career included serving as a speaker pro tem in the Maryland House of Delegates and as state's attorney for Washington County. In 1866, he formed the law practice Syester & Freaner with George Freaner. In 1867, he was a delegate to the Constitutional Convention of Maryland, and in 1868, he was a delegate to the Democratic National Convention.

=== Attorney General ===
As Maryland's Attorney General from 1871 to 1875, Syester was involved in the prosecution of notable cases, including that of Mrs. Elizabeth (or Ellen) G. Wharton, accused of poisoning. The trial drew significant attention, though the jury ultimately found Mrs. Wharton not guilty.

=== Judicial career ===
Syester's career concluded with his role as an associate judge of the Fourth Judicial Circuit from 1882 until 1889, when health issues led to his retirement.

== Death ==
Andrew Kershner Syester died on March 25, 1891, in Hagerstown and was buried in Rose Hill Cemetery in the same city. His career reflects the changing legal and political dynamics of Maryland in the 19th century, marked by various positions that illustrate the era's complexities rather than individual accomplishments.
