= 1999 Baltimore mayoral election =

- November 2, 1999
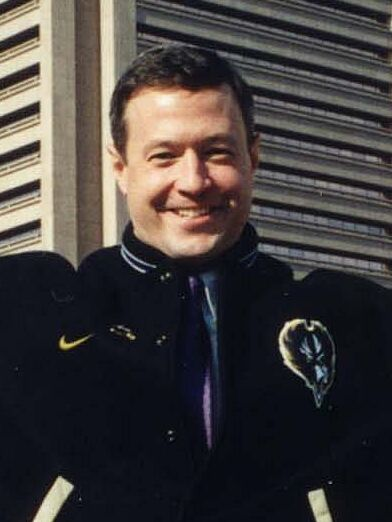

Candidate	Martin O'Malley	David F. Tufaro
Party	Democratic	Republican
Popular vote	87,607	9,207
Percentage	90.5%	9.5%
Mayor before election
Kurt Schmoke
Democratic
Elected mayor
Martin O'Malley
Democratic

On November 2, 1999, the city of Baltimore, Maryland, elected a new mayor, the 47th in the city's history. Primary elections were held to determine the nominees for the Democratic Party and Republican Party on September 14. Incumbent mayor Kurt Schmoke, a Democrat, opted not to run for reelection. Martin O'Malley, a member of the Baltimore City Council, won the election to succeed Schmoke.

Because Baltimore's electorate is overwhelmingly Democratic, it was widely believed that the city's next mayor would effectively be chosen in the Democratic primary election. Baltimore's large African American population initially made it seem likely that Schmoke would be succeeded by another African American. Former Congressman Kweisi Mfume was the preferred candidate of local politicians, but he opted not to run. Though Carl Stokes and Lawrence Bell, members of the city council, declared for the race, local leaders were underwhelmed with the quality of declared candidates.

In 1999, Baltimore experienced high rates of murder and unemployment, and had a failing city school system. O'Malley declared his candidacy, focusing his campaign on a "zero tolerance" approach to crime. He received endorsements from many of the city's African American leaders. After what had been competitive race, O'Malley overtook both Stokes and Bell to win the Democratic nomination by a sizable margin, making him an overwhelming favorite in the general election. He defeated Republican candidate David F. Tufaro in the general election by an overwhelming majority.

== Background ==
Kurt Schmoke, the incumbent Mayor of Baltimore, was serving his third term. He announced in December 1998 that he would not run for reelection the following year, the first time an incumbent Baltimore mayor did not run for reelection since 1971. Schmoke was the first African American elected mayor in Baltimore's history.

Racial politics had long played a role in Baltimore. As the state of Maryland did not attempt to prevent African Americans from voting through Jim Crow laws, political coalitions often involved African American community leaders. Theodore McKeldin, who served as mayor from 1943 through 1947 and from 1963 through 1967, was one of the first political leaders to work with African American community leaders. By 1999, 63% of Baltimore's registered voters were African American, and 90% were registered to the Democratic Party. Baltimore had not elected a Republican mayor since 1963.

As of 1999, Baltimore experienced 300 murders a year, which was the fourth most in the nation. Unemployment was 9%, twice the national average. Between 1990 and 1998, Baltimore saw its population decrease by 12.3%, the second-biggest decrease during that time period in the United States. This decrease led to its work force decreasing by one-sixth. The city saw decreases in heavy-manufacturing by 40 percent, distribution jobs by 35 percent, retail positions by 34 percent, and banking jobs by 28 percent. Also, the state of Maryland had taken over the city's failing school system in 1996, which upset African American politicians. State Senator Clarence M. Mitchell, IV called the takeover racist. Baltimore City Council members, including President Lawrence Bell and Martin O'Malley, had opposed the handling of Baltimore's high crime rate by Schmoke and Baltimore Police Department (BPD) Commissioner Thomas C. Frazier.

== Democratic primary ==
=== Candidates ===
- Lawrence Bell, president of the city council
- Mary Conaway, city register of wills
- Martin O'Malley, city council member from Northeast Baltimore
- Carl Stokes, former city council member

==== Declined ====
- Joan Carter Conway, state senator (endorsed O'Malley)
- Patricia Jessamy, Baltimore state's attorney
- Kwesi Mfume, president of the NAACP and former U.S. representative from Catonsville
- Joan Pratt, city comptroller
- Pete Rawlings, state delegate (endorsed O'Malley)
- Bishop Robinson, former Baltimore police commissioner
- William Donald Schaefer, Maryland state comptroller and former mayor (endorsed Robinson; later O'Malley)
- Kurt Schmoke, incumbent mayor since 1987

==== Minor candidates ====
None of these candidates received more than 0.10% of the popular vote.

- Philip A. Brown Jr.
- Robert S. Cunningham
- Richard A. Darrah
- Jessica June Davis
- Charles A. Dugger
- Vincent Phillip Fullard
- John William Hahn
- A. Robert Kaufman
- Bernard Kempa
- Gene Lamar Michaels
- Sandra Okwaye
- Richard Riha
- William Edward Roberts Sr.

Bell was considered in February 1999 to be the front-runner in the mayoral race. Other potential candidates included State's Attorney Patricia Jessamy, former city councilman Carl Stokes, City Comptroller Joan Pratt, and Joan Carter Conway, a member of the Maryland State Senate.

City leaders, including Howard P. Rawlings, a member of the Maryland House of Delegates, and William Donald Schaefer, the Comptroller of Maryland and Schmoke's predecessor as mayor, feared that none of the potential candidates had the vision to continue the urban renewal that took place under Schmoke and Schaefer. They hoped that Baltimore-native Kweisi Mfume, the president of the National Association for the Advancement of Colored People (NAACP), would run. Mfume had previously served on the Baltimore City Council and in the United States House of Representatives. Schmoke called the race "his to lose". However, Mfume lived in nearby Catonsville, Maryland, and did not move into Baltimore until March, which would leave him short of the one-year residency requirement. Schaefer stated that he had no interest in running, and threw his support behind Bishop Robinson, the former BPD Commissioner. Robinson chose not to run.

The state legislature passed a law shortening the residency requirement from one year to six months, which was signed into law by Democratic Governor Parris Glendening in April. Bell attempted to have the legislation overturned. The City Council, with Schmoke's support considered raising the salary of the mayor in April, to make the position more enticing to Mfume. Also, 200 Baltimore citizens, including three former mayors, attempted to draft Mfume into the race. However, Mfume had signed a five-year contract with the NAACP in 1996. Mfume considered leaving the NAACP to run, but in May, decided to remain with the organization.

Stokes announced his candidacy in December 1998. Bell announced his candidacy two days after Mfume passed on running, in May 1999, promising to tackle crime and improve public safety. Community leaders who attempted to draft Mfume into the race began to back Stokes. Other declared candidates included Mary Conaway, the City Register of Wills, activists A. Robert Kaufman, Robert Marsili, and Phillip Brown. Jessamy stated that without Mfume in the race, she would consider running, but she opted against getting into the race.

O'Malley initially supported Bell's candidacy. Bell urged O'Malley to endorse him, and offered him the job of city solicitor in exchange for his support. However, O'Malley began to distance himself from Bell, not appearing at Bell's campaign announcement, due to disagreements on several bills debated at the city council. Bell's supporters attempted to convince O'Malley to run for City Council President, but O'Malley announced his decision to run for mayor in June, becoming the first major candidate in the race who was Caucasian. O'Malley made a late entrance into the multi-candidate primary. He began his campaign largely unknown outside of Northeast Baltimore.

=== Campaign ===
Fifteen candidates ended up running in the Democratic primary. The front-runners were considered to be O'Malley, Bell, and Stokes. Schmoke made no endorsement in the race.

O'Malley and Bell called for "zero tolerance" to all crime, though Stokes felt this policy was biased against minorities. Stokes ran on the issue of education, as he was a former member of the Baltimore school board, in addition to the city council. Stokes vowed to reduce class sizes and reverse the trend of citizens of Baltimore leaving the city to live in nearby suburbs.

O'Malley faced initial difficulties based on race, as a community leader stated that his entrance into the race "created some tension," and that O'Malley's potential victory "would be the worst thing that could happen in this city" and could "tear this city apart." Some saw his entrance in the race as an attempt to split the African American vote. However, O'Malley received endorsements from prominent African American politicians in August, including Rawlings, fellow state Delegate Kenneth Montague, and Conway. Rawlings credited O'Malley's "track record of empowering black Americans." O'Malley also received an endorsement from Schaefer. Some African Americans charged Rawlings with "stabbing us in the back" over the endorsement.

Bell attempted to portray himself as the heir apparent to Schmoke. However, disclosures from a lawsuit revealed Bell's financial troubles, which included having his car repossessed. Bell lost support after he stated that voters should choose him because "I look like you." Stokes began to lose support after he was charged with lying about having a college degree, when it was discovered that he did not graduate from Loyola University Maryland, as his campaign literature stated. It was also revealed that Stokes settled an income tax lien. Bell's supporters rallied outside the offices of The Baltimore Sun, challenging that they were writing negative stories about African American candidates, and giving better treatment to O'Malley during the campaign. Stokes was able to recover support when he received endorsements from The Baltimore Sun, the Baltimore Afro-American, and the ministerial alliance.

Seven candidates, including Democrats Bell, Stokes, O'Malley, and Conaway, and Republicans Adair, Tufaro, and Arthur Cuffie Jr., met for a debate on September 8. The debate focused on crime, with Bell, Stokes, and O'Malley making their cases regarding "zero tolerance", while Adair and Tufaro declared their support for Frazier.

=== Polling ===
A June 1999 poll conducted by Gonzales/Arscott Communications Inc., a polling firm based in Annapolis, Maryland, showed Schaefer ahead of Bell.

Bell led Stokes in a poll conducted early in the race, 33% to 17%, before O'Malley declared his candidacy. By late August, Bell slipped in the polls to third place, with O'Malley and Stokes tied. Bell and O'Malley began airing television commercials supporting their campaigns in early August, while Stokes did not begin to air commercials until September. O'Malley also advertised on the radio.

=== Results ===
The Democratic primary was held on September 14. Turnout was high; though the mayoral candidates expected about 100,000 voters, about half of Baltimore's 294,000 registered voters voted in the primary elections.

O'Malley won the primary election with more than 50% of the vote, though he received only 30% of the African American vote. Bell and Stokes split a significant portion of the city's black majority, but their combined total was less than O'Malley. At his victory rally, O'Malley called the election "a victory for diversity and a victory for inclusiveness".

Democratic primary results
Party	Candidate	Votes	%
Democratic	Martin O'Malley	62,711	53.2
Democratic	Carl Stokes	32,609	27.7
Democratic	Lawrence Bell	20,034	17.0
Democratic	Mary W. Conaway	1,205	0.1
Democratic	A. Robert Kaufman	238	<0.1
Democratic	Charles A. Dugger	194	<0.1
Democratic	Sandra Okwaye	149	<0.1
Democratic	Robert S. "Bobby" Cunningham	140	<0.1
Democratic	Phillip A. Brown, Jr.	133	<0.1
Democratic	William Edward Roberts, Sr.	92	<0.1
Democratic	Jessica June Davis	89	<0.1
Democratic	Gene Lamar Michaels	72	<0.1
Democratic	Richard Riha	52	<0.1
Democratic	Bernard Kempa	26	<0.1
Democratic	Richard A. Darrah	23	<0.1
Democratic	Vincent Phillip Fullard	23	<0.1
Democratic	John William Hahn	8	<0.1
Total votes		117,798	100

== Republican primary ==
=== Candidates ===
- Carl Adair, public school teacher and perennial candidate
- Arthur Cuffie Jr.
- Lynwood H. Leverette
- Roberto Marsili
- David F. Tufaro, real estate developer and lawyer from Roland Park
- Melanie M. Taylor

On July 1, David F. Tufaro, a real estate developer and lawyer from Roland Park, Maryland, announced his intention to run for the Republican Party nomination, joining three neighborhood activists who had already declared their intentions to run. Carl Adair, a public school teacher who had run unsuccessfully for the city council and the Maryland House of Delegates on numerous occasions, was also a candidate for the Republican nomination.

Republican Party officials quickly began to back Tufaro, who criticized the Democratic Party by pointing out that Democrats have led Baltimore in its decline.

=== Results ===
In the September 14 Republican primary, Tufaro received over half of the votes cast. Adair finished in second place.

Republican primary results
Party	Candidate	Votes	%
Republican	David F. Tufaro	3,399	52.0
Republican	Carl M. Adair	1,660	25.4
Republican	Melanie M. Taylor	608	9.3
Republican	Arthur Cuffie, Jr.	339	5.2
Republican	Lynwood H. Leverette	277	4.2
Republican	Roberto Marsili	251	3.8
Total votes		6,534	100

== General election ==
=== Candidates ===
- Martin O'Malley, city council member from Northeast Baltimore (Democratic)
- David F. Tufaro, real estate developer and lawyer from Roland Park (Republican)

=== Campaign ===
Despite the odds he faced in the general election, Tufaro promised to campaign against O'Malley, not taking defeat as an inevitability. He pointed to Bret Schundler, the mayor of Jersey City, New Jersey, as evidence that a Republican could be elected in a heavily Democratic city. Schundler came to Baltimore to campaign for Tufaro.

Regarding public housing, Tufaro called for renovations rather than demolishing vacant buildings, which drew criticism, as Housing Commissioner Daniel P. Henson III pointed out that renovating was more expensive than demolishing. O'Malley promised to enforce provisions of the Community Reinvestment Act of 1977, which require banks to invest in poor neighborhoods. Tufaro further proposed a plan for school vouchers and to drug test students, which drew opposition from the Baltimore Teachers Union and from O'Malley, who favored expanding pre-kindergarten and after-school programs, while making summer school mandatory. When discussing the problem of HIV/AIDS in Baltimore, which disproportionately affects African Americans, both O'Malley and Tufaro promised to continue the city's needle exchange program.

Tufaro criticized O'Malley's zero tolerance policy, suggesting it would lead to increased police brutality towards minorities. He instead proposed continuing Mayor Schmoke's community policing strategy. Opponents of the zero tolerance policy tried to tie O'Malley to the Baltimore Police shooting of an African American car theft suspect.

=== Polling ===
WMAR-TV conducted the only poll of the general election with SurveyUSA, which showed O'Malley leading with 87% of the vote. On Election Day, O'Malley easily defeated Tufaro in the general election, receiving over 90% of the vote.

=== Results ===
Baltimore City Mayoral General Election, 1999
Party	Candidate	Votes	%
Democratic	Martin O'Malley	87,607	90.5
Republican	David F. Tufaro	9,207	9.5
Total votes		96,814	100
Democratic hold			

== Aftermath ==
=== O'Malley's political career ===
Following his election, O'Malley's first personnel decision was to retain the director of the city's economic development agency. O'Malley had his transition team, and had them compile policy drafts by mid-December, so they would be ready to compete for state funds when the Maryland State Legislature reconvened on January 12, 2000. He participated in the Newly Elected Mayors Program at the John F. Kennedy School of Government in mid-November. By the beginning of December, he named five deputy mayors and filled most of his cabinet. He finalized his cabinet on December 7, during his last session as a city councillor. He was sworn in as mayor later that day at the War Memorial Plaza, near Baltimore City Hall.

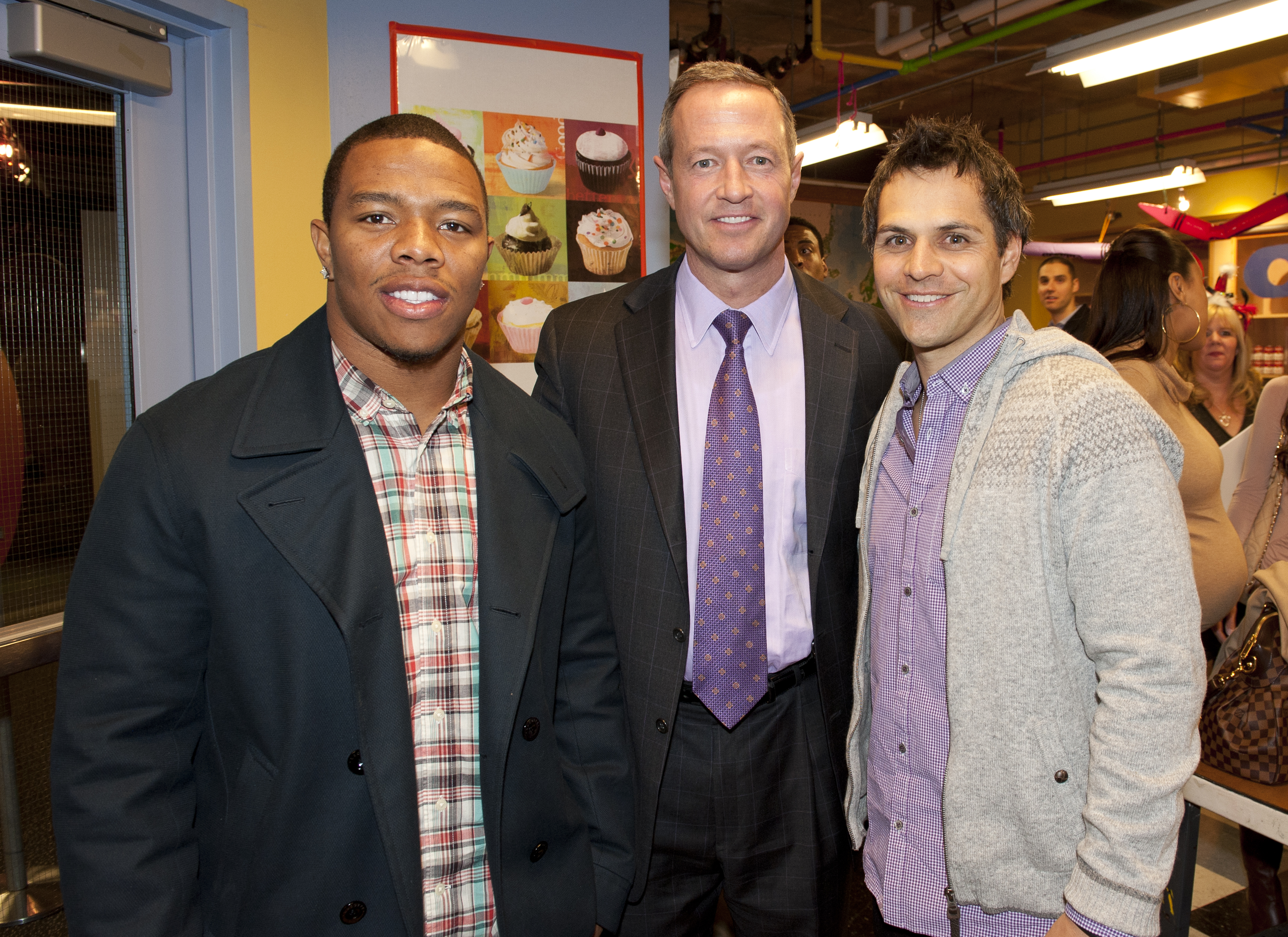
Ray Rice (left), O'Malley (center), and Brian Roberts (right) at the University of Maryland Hospital for Children in 2011

In his first year in office, O'Malley adopted a statistics-based crime tracking system called CitiStat, modeled after Compstat. The system logged every call for service into a database for analysis. The Washington Post wrote in 2006 that Baltimore's "homicide rate remains stubbornly high and its public school test scores disappointingly low. But CitiStat has saved an estimated $350 million and helped generate the city's first budget surplus in years." In 2004, CitiStat accountability tool won Harvard University's "Innovations in American Government" award. The system garnered interest from Washington, D.C. Mayor Adrian Fenty, as well as crime officials from the United Kingdom.

O'Malley considered a run for Governor of Maryland in the 2002 election, but decided not to run. He was reelected as Mayor of Baltimore in 2003, and announced his candidacy for governor in the 2006 election. The Baltimore Sun endorsed O'Malley, saying: "When he was first elected mayor in 1999, the former two-term city councilman inherited a city of rising crime, failing schools, and shrinking economic prospects. He was able to reverse course in all of these areas." The Washington Post criticized O'Malley for "not solv[ing] the problems of rampant crime and rough schools in Baltimore", but further said that "he put a dent in them.". O'Malley defeated incumbent governor Bob Ehrlich 53%-46% in the November 7, 2006, general election. O'Malley defeated Ehrlich in the 2010 election 56%-42%, receiving just over one million votes.

O'Malley was ineligible to run in the 2014 gubernatorial election due to term limits. O'Malley publicly expressed interest in a presidential run in 2016 on multiple occasions. At a press conference at a National Governors Association meeting, O'Malley stated he was laying "the framework" for a presidential run.

=== Depiction on The Wire ===
A fictionalized version of the events of this election were presented in third and fourth seasons of The Wire, a drama about crime and politics in Baltimore, which aired in 2004 and 2006, respectively. Many saw the connection between O'Malley and the character of Tommy Carcetti, a Caucasian Baltimore City Councillor who is elected mayor in an election against two African American opponents. Carlos Watson of MSNBC once introduced O'Malley as "one of the real-life inspirations for the mayor of the hit TV show The Wire", to which O'Malley responded that he was instead the show's "antidote".

Show creator David Simon denied that the character of Tommy Carcetti was supposed to be O'Malley, though he did acknowledge that O'Malley was "one of several inspirations" for Carcetti. He further stated that while Carcetti was "reflective" of O'Malley, Carcetti was a composite drawing aspects from other local politicians that he had covered when he worked as a reporter for The Baltimore Sun.

== See also ==
- List of mayors of Baltimore
- United States elections, 1999
