= List of state's attorneys of Baltimore =

State's Attorney of Baltimore
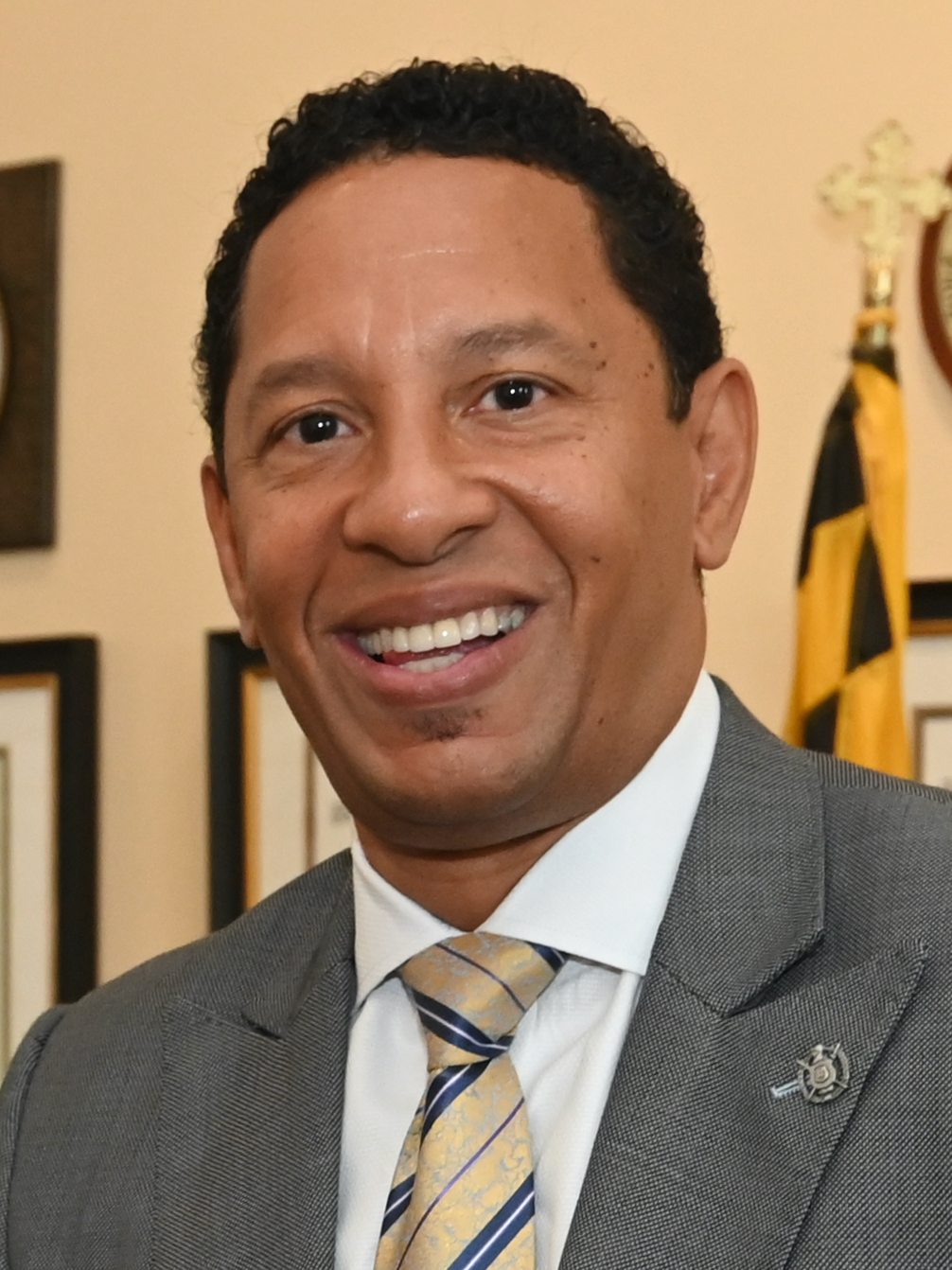
- Incumbent; Ivan Bates since January 3, 2023
- Type: District attorney
- Precursor: Deputy Attorney of Baltimore
- Inaugural holder: Charles J. M. Gwinn
- Formation: 1851; 175 years ago

The state's attorney of Baltimore is the chief prosecutor representing the state of Maryland in the independent city of Baltimore. The position was established in 1851, replacing the office of deputy attorney, which was appointed by the attorney general of Maryland. The incumbent state's attorney is Ivan Bates, a position he has held since January 3, 2023.

== State's attorneys ==
Image	Name	Tenure	Party	Notes	Refs.
	Charles J. M. Gwinn	January 5, 1852 – January 8, 1856	Democratic	Previously elected to the Maryland House of Delegates; later elected attorney general of Maryland	
—N/a	Milton Whitney Sr.	January 8, 1856 – 1861	Unknown		
—N/a	Archibald Stirling Sr.	1861 – 1863	Unconditional Union		
	John Lewis Thomas Jr.	1863 – 1865	Unconditional Union	Later elected to the U.S. House of Representatives	
	John Lewis Thomas Jr.	1863 – 1865	Republican	Later elected to the U.S. House of Representatives	
	Aloysius Leo Knott	1867 – 1879	Democratic	Previously and later elected to the Maryland House of Delegates	
—N/a	Charles G. Kerr	1879 – 1895	Democratic		
—N/a	Henry Duffy	1895 – 1899	Republican		
—N/a	Robert M. McLane Jr.	1899 – 1903	Democratic		
—N/a	Albert S. J. Owens	1903 – 1912	Democratic		
	William Frederick Broening	1912 – 1920	Republican	Later elected mayor of Baltimore	
—N/a	Robert F. Leach Jr.	1920 – 1923	Democratic		
	Herbert O'Conor	1923 – 1934	Democratic	Later elected attorney general of Maryland, governor of Maryland, and to the U.S. Senate	
—N/a	J. Bernard Wells	1935 – 1950	Democratic		
—N/a	Anselm Sodaro	1950 – 1956	Democratic		
—N/a	J. Harold Grady	1956 – 1959	Democratic	Later elected mayor of Baltimore	
—N/a	Saul A. Harris	1959 – 1963	Democratic		
—N/a	William J. O'Donnell	1963 – 1964	Democratic		
—N/a	Charles E. Moylan Jr.	1964 – 1970	Democratic	Later appointed to the Maryland Court of Special Appeals	
—N/a	Milton B. Allen	1970 – 1974	Democratic		
—N/a	William A. Swisher	1974 – 1982	Democratic		
	Kurt Schmoke	1982 – 1987	Democratic	Later elected mayor of Baltimore	
—N/a	Stuart O. Simms	1987 – 1995	Democratic	Unsuccessfully sought the Democratic nomination in the 2006 Maryland Attorney General election, receiving 44.3% of the vote to Doug Gansler's 55.7%.	
	Patricia Jessamy	February 1995 – January 3, 2011	Democratic		
—N/a	Gregg L. Bernstein	January 3, 2011 – January 5, 2015	Democratic		
	Marilyn Mosby	January 5, 2015 – January 3, 2023	Democratic		
	Ivan Bates	January 3, 2023 – present	Democratic		
