= Joey Jett =

American skateboarder

Personal information
- Born: Joey Hornish; June 19, 1998 (age 28) Baltimore, Maryland, U.S.
- Years active: 2006–present
- Mother: Isabel Mercedes Cumming
- Website: joeyjett.com

Sport
- Sport: Skateboarding

Joey "Jett" Hornish (born June 19, 1998) is a professional skateboarder. He was born in Baltimore, Maryland. Mike Vallely named Jett professional in 2017. Jett also started Jett brand clothing in 2019.

== Career ==
When Jett was 6 years old his mother, Isabel Mercedes Cumming, went to a yard sale and bought her son his first skateboard. Jett skated in national competitions and was invited to skate at the AST Dew Tour in 2006 - 2009. At the age of 7 Jett was on the Dew Sports Tour (Extreme Sports Circuit). Jett was the youngest skateboarder (seven years old) to successfully land a 540 ( 1 ½ rotations in midair) in a skate competition. He was sponsored by Conformist, a Baltimore skateboarding company., Underground Wheels, and Osiris shoes.

When Jett was seven years old he was named event MVP of a Philadelphia event by Mike Vallely. Jett was named top ten athlete in Maryland with Michael Phelps and Carmelo Anthony in 2009. Jett stopped skating for almost five years between 2010–2015 and then returned as a streetskater. His return video was called "The Comeback" and can be found on YouTube.

In 2017, at Charm City Skate Park, Mike Vallely presented Jett with his first pro model skateboard by Street Plant Boards. Jett's pro video, The Dream, which Jett also edited and directed, has over 800,000 views. It includes Mike Vallely skating with Mark Gonzales at Brooklyn Banks.

In January and October 2018, Jett helped raise money for Jake's Skatepark which will be located in Baltimore's Inner Harbor. The park was named for Jake Owen, a five-year-old skater who was killed by a driver distracted while using a cell phone. Jett has also helped raise money for Sharped Dress Man, a program to help empower men in Baltimore and California. Jett also successfully started JETT brand clothing line in 2019. He was the first skateboarder selected to be in the national anti-animal abuse program, Show Your Soft Side campaign.

In January 2020, Jett was part of the groundbreaking ceremonies for Baltimore's Rash Field in the Inner Harbor. He received a Mayoral proclamation for his fundraising efforts for the park and his advocacy for skateboarding. Jett's latest film, The Reality showcased some of the best skaters in Baltimore and filmed the reality of Baltimore City street skating as well as exhibiting the clothing In November 2021, Jake's skatepark was completed and Jett successfully aired over the Mayor of Baltimore in the opening ceremonies.

In July 2021, Jett teamed up with pro skater and former addict Brandon Novak to help others fight addictions. While in Barcelona, Spain the two Baltimore skaters filmed a video part called The Awakening to help other skaters realize there are roads to recovery. Monies from a Jett fashion drop was donated to the Novak Recovery House

In May 2022, Jett Brand participated in the Future of Fashion show at the Smithsonian Institution in Washington, DC. This highly successful fashion show was shown on HBO and featured 10 international designers with Jett being the youngest designer. Also in May 2022, Jett established "Breakfast & Boards" for the children of Baltimore City to have skate lessons at Jake's skatepark each month after visiting a Boys & Girls Club in Baltimore. This popularity of event continued to soar as Jett's Breakfast & Boards lessons were named "Best Kids Class" in Baltimore by Baltimore Magazine in the Best of Baltimore Issue in August 2023.

Jett was named a Baltimore Gamechanger by Baltimore Magazine for his impact on the community. On May 5, 2024, Jett opened the Jett Studio which is home to the Create & Sk8 program and the 501(c) non-profit the Bmore Skate Youth Project. The Studio located on the second floor of Charm City Skatepark in Canton has skating, screen printing and creativity for the kids of Baltimore.

Jett's non-profit is said to help Baltimore children learn the importance of being creative. Jett's clothing brand is entering its fifth year.

== Personal life ==
Jett graduated from Patuxent High School in 2016.
