= Patricia Jessamy =

American lawyer (born 1948)

Honorable Patricia C. Jessamy
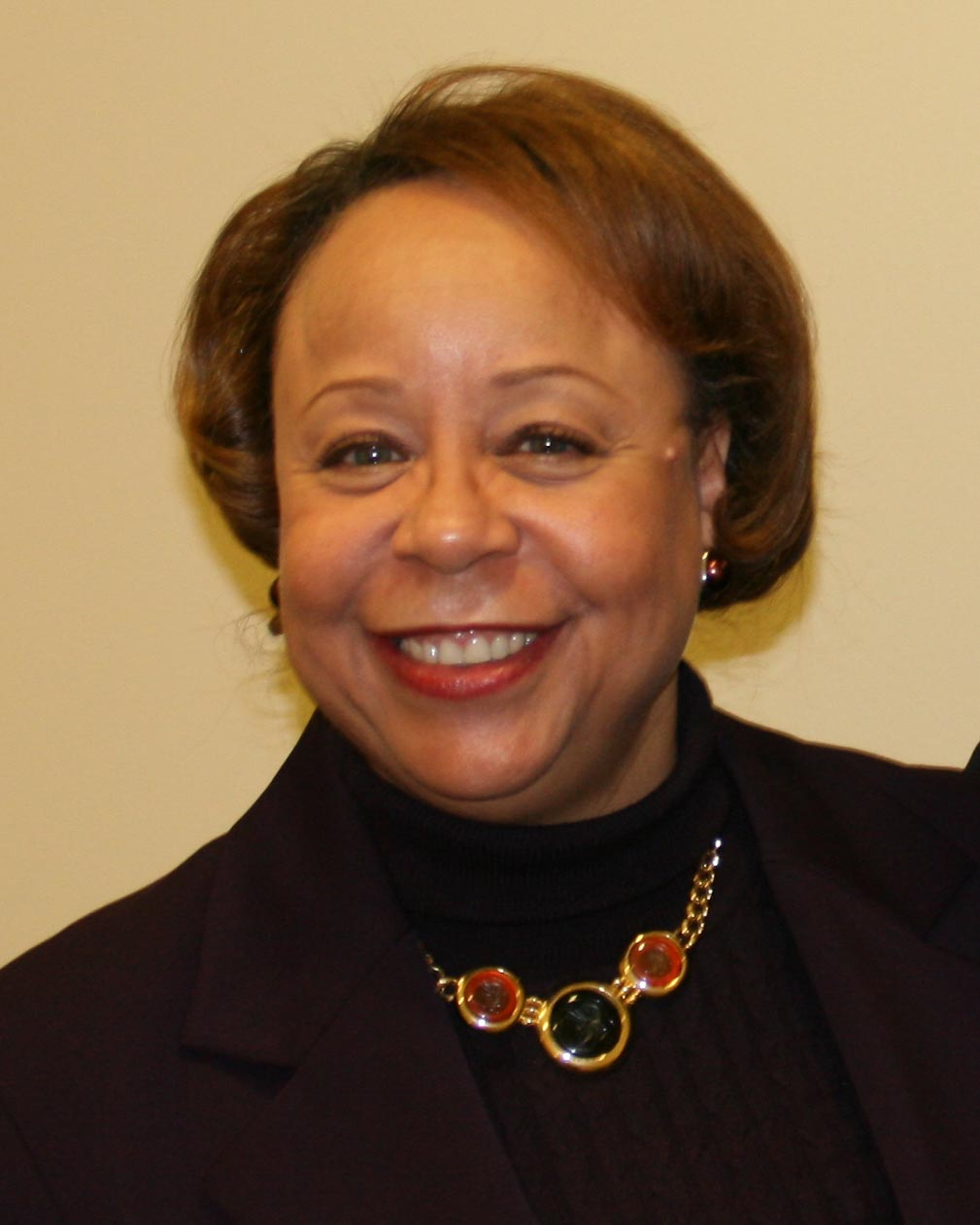

State's Attorney of Baltimore
- In office 1995–2011
- Preceded by: Stuart O. Simms
- Succeeded by: Gregg Bernstein
- Constituency: Baltimore, Maryland, U.S.

Personal details
- Born: July 26, 1948 (age 78) Hollandale, Mississippi
- Party: Democratic
- Spouse: Howard Jessamy
- Education: Jackson State University; University of Mississippi School of Law
- Profession: Attorney
- Website: http://www.stattorney.org/article01.html

Patricia Coats Jessamy (born July 26, 1948) is an American politician who served as the State's Attorney of Baltimore, from 1995 to 2011.

== Background ==
Born on July 26, 1948, in Hollandale, Mississippi. She received a B.A. from Jackson State University in 1970 and graduated from the University of Mississippi School of Law in 1974, and admitted to the Maryland Bar that year.

== Career ==
Jessamy was the first woman to serve as Baltimore State’s Attorney. She may have pioneered the "do not call" list for police with integrity problems. She began her legal career in Maryland in 1985 as an assistant state’s attorney. In 1987, State’s Attorney Stuart Simms appointed Jessamy as deputy state’s attorney for administration. As deputy state’s attorney, Jessamy created the Victim Assistance Program and was responsible for all fiscal matters, budgets, and personnel. In 1995, the Circuit Court unanimously appointed Jessamy as state’s attorney following Simms' resignation to become state secretary for juvenile services. She has successfully run for re-election in November 1998, 2002, and 2006. Jessamy considered running for Mayor of Baltimore during the 1999 mayoral election, but declined to run.

Jessamy was defeated in her September 14, 2010, primary bid by Democrat Gregg Bernstein.
