= Marilyn Mosby =

American politician and lawyer (born 1980)

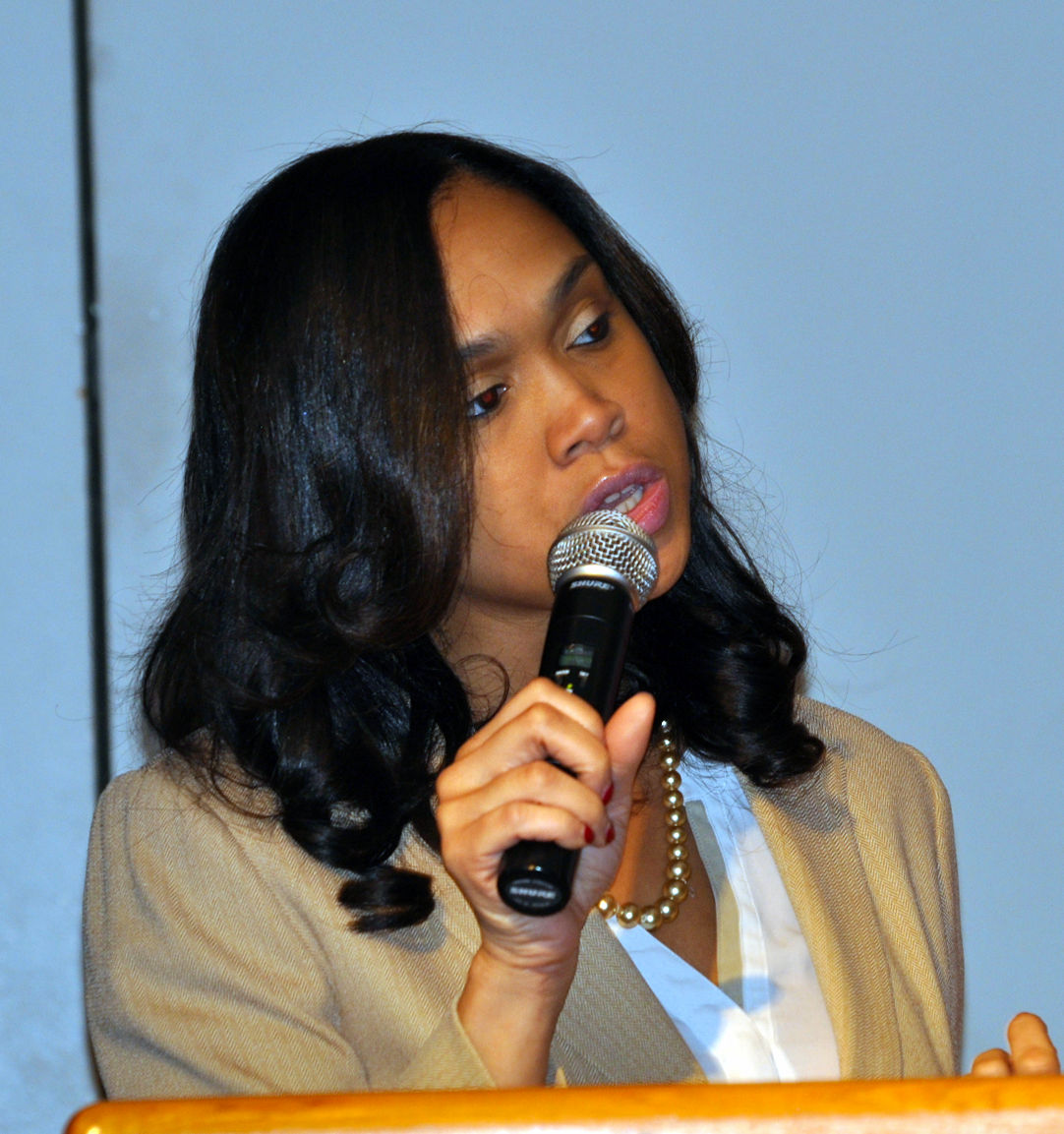

25th State's Attorney of Baltimore
- In office January 8, 2015 – January 3, 2023
- Preceded by: Gregg Bernstein
- Succeeded by: Ivan Bates

Personal details
- Born: Marilyn James; January 22, 1980 (age 46) Boston, Massachusetts, U.S.
- Party: Democratic
- Spouse: Nick Mosby (m. 2005; sep. 2023)
- Children: 2
- Education: Tuskegee University (BA); Boston College (JD)

Marilyn Mosby (née James; born January 22, 1980) is a former American politician and lawyer who served as the State's Attorney of Baltimore from 2015 to 2023. She was the youngest state prosecutor for any major city in the United States. Mosby gained national attention following the killing of Freddie Gray in 2015, after which she led a highly publicized investigation and unsuccessful murder prosecution of the police officers who arrested and transported Gray.

Mosby was re-elected in 2018 but lost her 2022 reelection campaign to Ivan Bates.

== Early life ==
Born Marilyn James in Massachusetts, Mosby was raised by her grandparents in the Dorchester section of Boston, Massachusetts. Her mother and father both served as police officers and her grandfather was one of the first African-American police officers in the state. She attended Dover-Sherborn High School, an hour away from her home, as a result of METCO, the longest-standing school desegregation program in the country. She served in the Student Government Association, and was co-editor of the school newspaper.

Her interest in practicing law was sparked by the murder of her 17-year-old cousin outside of her home, due to being misidentified as a drug dealer by criminals.

In 2000, when she was a 20-year-old Tuskegee University student, James appeared on the Judge Judy television show as a plaintiff, suing a person that broke into her apartment for damaging her property during summer break. She was successful, and was awarded $1,700 for damages. She graduated magna cum laude from Tuskegee University with a (B.A.) degree; she earned a Juris Doctor from Boston College Law School in 2005.

== Career ==
Mosby served as a law clerk, an Assistant State's Attorney for Baltimore, and Liberty Mutual fraud investigator from 2005 to 2014. Before that she had held a series of legal internships in Boston while in law school.

=== State's Attorney for City of Baltimore ===
2014 Baltimore State's Attorney Democratic primary results by precinct Mosby: 50–60%; 60–70%; 70–80%; 80–90%; >90%; Bernstein: 50–60%; 60–70%; 70–80%; 80–90%; Tie

Mosby announced her plans to run for State's Attorney for the City of Baltimore in June 2013. She ran against incumbent Gregg L. Bernstein in the Democratic primary, defeating him with 55 percent of the vote. She faced no Republican opposition in the general election. Mosby won the general election, receiving 94 percent of the vote, defeating Independent Russell A. Neverdon Sr., who ran a write-in campaign.

At the time of her election, Mosby was the youngest top prosecutor in a major US city. She was sworn into office on January 8, 2015. Soon after her first term in office had begun, Mosby announced restructuring of her office that was inspired by ideas from prosecutors' offices in New York, Los Angeles, and Atlanta. Deputy State's Attorney Janice Bledsoe was named to oversee the new division of "criminal intelligence". Mosby reestablished community liaison positions, which her predecessor had eliminated, to inform residents of developments in cases relevant to their neighborhood. She created the Policy and Legislative Affairs Unit to advocate for legislation to prosecute cases more efficiently.

Mosby pushed unsuccessfully for bills that would have allowed prosecutors to introduce prior accusations against serial sex offenders during trial, an issue which she raised during her campaign. In May 2015, she secured the conviction of Nelson Clifford, a sex-offender who was acquitted in four previous sexual assault cases involving a "consent" defense. After the verdict she stated, "While we were able to secure a guilty verdict in this case, we must still encourage our legislators in Annapolis to bring our predatory sexual assault laws in line with the federal statute". Clifford was sentenced to more than 30 years in prison.

In January 2019, she announced that her office would no longer prosecute individuals for marijuana possession, regardless of quantity. She added that she would vacate nearly 5,000 marijuana possession convictions. In 2020, during the COVID-19 pandemic, she announced that her office would not pursue charges related to drug possession, prostitution, minor traffic violations, and low-level offenses in order to halt the spread of the coronavirus in Baltimore prisons. In March 2021, she made the policy permanent, as she said that the temporary experiment had not led to more serious crimes.

2022 Baltimore State's Attorney Democratic primary results by precinct Bates: 30–40%; 40–50%; 50–60%; 60–70%; 70–80%; Vignarajah: 30–40%; 40–50%; 50–60%; 60–70%; Mosby: 30–40%; 40–50%; 50–60%; 60–70%; Tie: 30–40%; 40–50%

Mosby announced on April 12, 2022, that she would run for re-election to a third term. She was defeated by defense attorney Ivan Bates in the Democratic primary on July 19, 2022.

==== Prosecutions of violent offenders ====
Mosby campaigned on a promise to target and prosecute violent repeat offenders. Since her administration began in January 2015, she oversaw successful prosecutions of a number of locally highlighted offenders, such as Darryl Anderson, Capone Chase, Nelson Clifford, Mustafa Eraibi, and Cornell Harvey.

She created the Criminal Strategies Unit, modeled after a similar unit in the Manhattan District Attorney's Office, to use community assistance to identify and target violent repeat offenders. The Unit utilizes technology, data-analysis, and intelligence-gathering in combination with close relationships with community organizations to identify trends in crime and works with law enforcement to target those who perpetuate these trends.

In response to a 2015 spike in violent crime in Baltimore, Mosby and newly appointed interim Police Commissioner Kevin Davis announced that prosecutors and police officers would co-locate inside of a 24-hour "war room" in which law enforcement would target violent repeat offenders around the clock.

==== Freddie Gray case ====
Following Freddie Gray's death in police custody in 2015, Mosby announced charges against six Baltimore police officers, including charges ranging from misconduct to manslaughter and murder. Although all criminal charges ultimately resulted in acquittals or dismissals, Mosby defended the prosecution as an effort to hold law enforcement accountable and restore public trust. Following the dismissal of the remaining charges in the case, Mosby publicly criticized aspects of the police investigation, arguing that investigative failures and lack of cooperation undermined the prosecution. In 2016, she introduced police accountability reform proposals aimed at strengthening oversight, transparency, and accountability mechanisms within law enforcement.

==== Conviction Integrity Unit ====
One of Mosby's work was the creation of the Baltimore City State's Attorney's Office Conviction Integrity Unit, one of the first units established by a prosecutor's office in Maryland.

During her administration, the unit reviewed past convictions and helped secure exonerations for 13 individuals who had collectively spent hundreds of years incarcerated. These cases included individuals known as the "Harlem Park Three ," subjects of the HBO documentary, When a Witness Recants. and the reversal of the conviction of Adnan Syed, whose case gained international attention through the podcast Serial.

==== COVID-19 CARES Act ====
In 2020, during the unprecedented uncertainty of the COVID-19 pandemic, Mosby accessed approximately $90,000 from her own deferred compensation retirement account through a provision of the federal Coronavirus Aid, Relief, and Economic Security (CARES) Act that permitted eligible individuals to make penalty-free withdrawals after certifying that they had experienced "adverse financial consequences" related to COVID-19. Mosby's defense argued that the phrase "adverse financial consequences" was never clearly defined by Congress, the Internal Revenue Service, or the withdrawal form itself. She maintained that, at the time of certification, the pandemic had significantly disrupted her newly established travel-related business, Mahogany Elite, by eliminating the ability for normal travel operations to begin and jeopardizing the capital and investments she had already made in preparing the company.

The government alleged that Mosby improperly accessed pandemic-related retirement relief funds and later obtained convictions for perjury related to those certifications. Mosby was found guilty of the mortgage fraud convictions on She subsequently appealed this conviction to the 4th Circuit, where her mortgage fraud conviction and the forfeiture of her property was reversed, but her perjury convictions upheld.

==== Community outreach ====
Mosby started initiatives to engage the Baltimore community, including:

- Aim to B'More – Begun in the spring of 2015 to provide an alternative to incarceration and a criminal record for first-time, non-violent felony drug offenders. Eligible defendants are granted probation before judgment, and placed on three years of probation. During probation, defendants complete 150 hours of community service, job skills training, and GED testing and/or substance abuse treatment as needed. The Office of the State's Attorney partnered with local employers to secure full-time jobs for program participants following completion of their job skills training. If successful, after three years participants can apply to expunge their records.
- Junior State's Attorney – Launched in the summer of 2015, the program introduces up to 30 promising middle school students each summer to careers in the criminal justice field.
- Community Day in Court – In an effort to rebuild trust and faith in the criminal justice system, Mosby began holding quarterly Community Days in Court, bringing the public and law enforcement together to discuss issues troubling the city.

==== IRS tax lien and Inspector General findings ====
In October 2020, a $45,000 federal tax lien was filed against the property of Marilyn Mosby and her husband Nick for three years of unpaid federal taxes (2014, 2015, and 2016). Nick Mosby said he has been "in ongoing conversations with the IRS" about resolving this issue. That November, he said the issue was "settled".

In addition to criticism of her case against the officers charged in Gray's death, Mosby faced questions about her frequent speaking engagements and private businesses. Though she maintained she did nothing wrong, Mosby asked city inspector general Isabel Mercedes Cumming to investigate. Cumming found Mosby was out of town for 144 workdays in 2018 and 2019, did not report 15 out-of-town trips to the Board of Estimates, and had used LLCs (that she had falsely claimed were dormant) for tax write-offs. City Solicitor Jim Shea issued his own assessment of Mosby's travel activity, finding that the city's administrative rules on travel reporting by elected officials were unclear, therefore Mosby was not at fault for not reporting her out-of-town travel.

Two days later, it was determined that the lawyers who responded to the Baltimore Inspector General's report (in defense of Mosby) were paid using Mosby's re-election campaign funds, a violation of state law. Shortly afterwards, land records revealed Mosby bought two homes in Florida, including a $476,000 condominium.

==== Complaint against journalists ====
In May 2021, Mosby's office filed a complaint with the Federal Communications Commission (FCC) against Baltimore television station WBFF, which had been critical of Mosby, alleging the station's coverage of her office was "blatantly slanted, dishonest, misleading, racist, and extremely dangerous". The complaint also stated that "We welcome being held accountable, and we support First Amendment freedom of speech." WBFF responded that its journalism was in the public interest, and "While we understand that it's not always popular with the individuals and institutions upon which we are shining a light, we stand by our reporting."

FCC commissioner Brendan Carr characterized Mosby's complaint as, "a chilling and direct attack on free speech and journalistic freedom".

== Federal COVID-19 relief perjury and mortgage fraud ==
On January 13, 2022, Mosby was indicted by a federal grand jury on perjury charges alleging she falsely claimed COVID-19-related financial hardship in requesting one-time withdrawals of $40,000 and $50,000 of her deferred compensation funds under the CARES Act, which describes specific criteria for qualifying withdrawals, such as a reduction of income due to a COVID-related layoff or due to quarantining, whereas she reportedly had continued to draw her full salary throughout the period, and her salary had actually increased. She additionally was accused of making false statements in mortgage applications for her Florida home and condo by failing to disclose her federal tax liabilities. There were four counts in the indictment.

On February 4, 2022, Mosby pleaded not guilty to the charges. Her trial was scheduled to begin in March 2023, but in January, her defense team of six attorneys, who had taken the case pro bono, were permitted to withdraw after being accused of violating court rules, which resulted in further delays. The lawyers' withdrawals stemmed from the possible criminal contempt charges facing lead defense attorney A. Scott Bolden for his conduct, including cursing on the courthouse steps and releasing secret jury information.

Despite having been employed as Baltimore's top prosecutor for the prior eight years, Mosby was declared indigent (too impoverished to pay for her own defense) in January 2023 and a public defender, attorney Maggie Grace, was assigned to represent her.

=== Trials, convictions, and sentencing ===
Mosby's perjury trial resulted in conviction on two counts on November 9, 2023. She faced five years in federal prison on each count at sentencing. On February 6, 2024, Mosby was also convicted on one count of making a false statement on a mortgage application in a split verdict, which found her not guilty on a second mortgage fraud charge. During the cross-examination of Marilyn Mosby's former husband, Nick Mosby, said his then-wife was unfairly targeted by investigators. His statements contradicted evidence already heard by the court. The judge admonished Nick Mosby for his deceptive testimony and told the jury to disregard his comments, then had them stricken from the record.

In February 2024, Mosby's defense counsel filed a motion to acquit, contending that the mortgage fraud did not happen in Maryland and claimed the government brought the case in the wrong venue.

Mosby's lawyer then alleged that a court security officer had made "inappropriate, derogatory comments" about Mosby during her mortgage fraud trial, and asked the court to provide information about whether jurors had entered the courthouse that day through the same public security check-in area.

Mosby faced up to 40 years of incarceration for her guilty verdicts if her appeals were not granted. On February 16, 2024, the judge overseeing the case upheld Marilyn Mosby's mortgage fraud conviction – rejecting her defense motion to acquit due to venue. Mosby was ordered to surrender her passport ahead of sentencing. According to media reports, prior to the hearing, supporters arrived by bus and packed the courtroom and prayed as Mosby entered the building.

In May 2024, ahead of her sentencing, Mosby appeared for an interview on MSNBC's The ReidOut, where she declared her innocence and called on President Joe Biden to pardon her, asserting that she had been "politically targeted" and that the proceedings had broken her psychologically, professionally, spiritually, and financially.

On May 23, 2024, Mosby was "spared prison for mortgage fraud and perjury" and instead, sentenced to 12 months of home confinement, 100 hours of community service, and three years of supervised release in connection with her perjury and mortgage fraud convictions. Her home detention sentence concluded on June 20, 2025. Mosby appealed her conviction to the United States Court of Appeals for the Fourth Circuit, which threw out her conviction for mortgage fraud but upheld the guilty verdicts for perjury. She then appealed to the U.S. Supreme Court, which declined to hear the case on October 5, 2026. On October 14, 2026, her mortgage fraud conviction was formally dismissed after prosecutors decided not to pursue a retrial.

== Disbarment ==
The Maryland Bar Counsel is seeking to suspend Mosby's law license and confiscate her Longboat Key, Florida properties which were the subject of her criminal fraud conviction (but not her federal perjury convictions).

== Personal life ==
In 2005 James married Nick Mosby, the former president of the Baltimore City Council. They have two daughters. On July 21, 2023, the Mosbys filed for divorce.
