= Ivan Bates =

American politician and lawyer (born 1968)

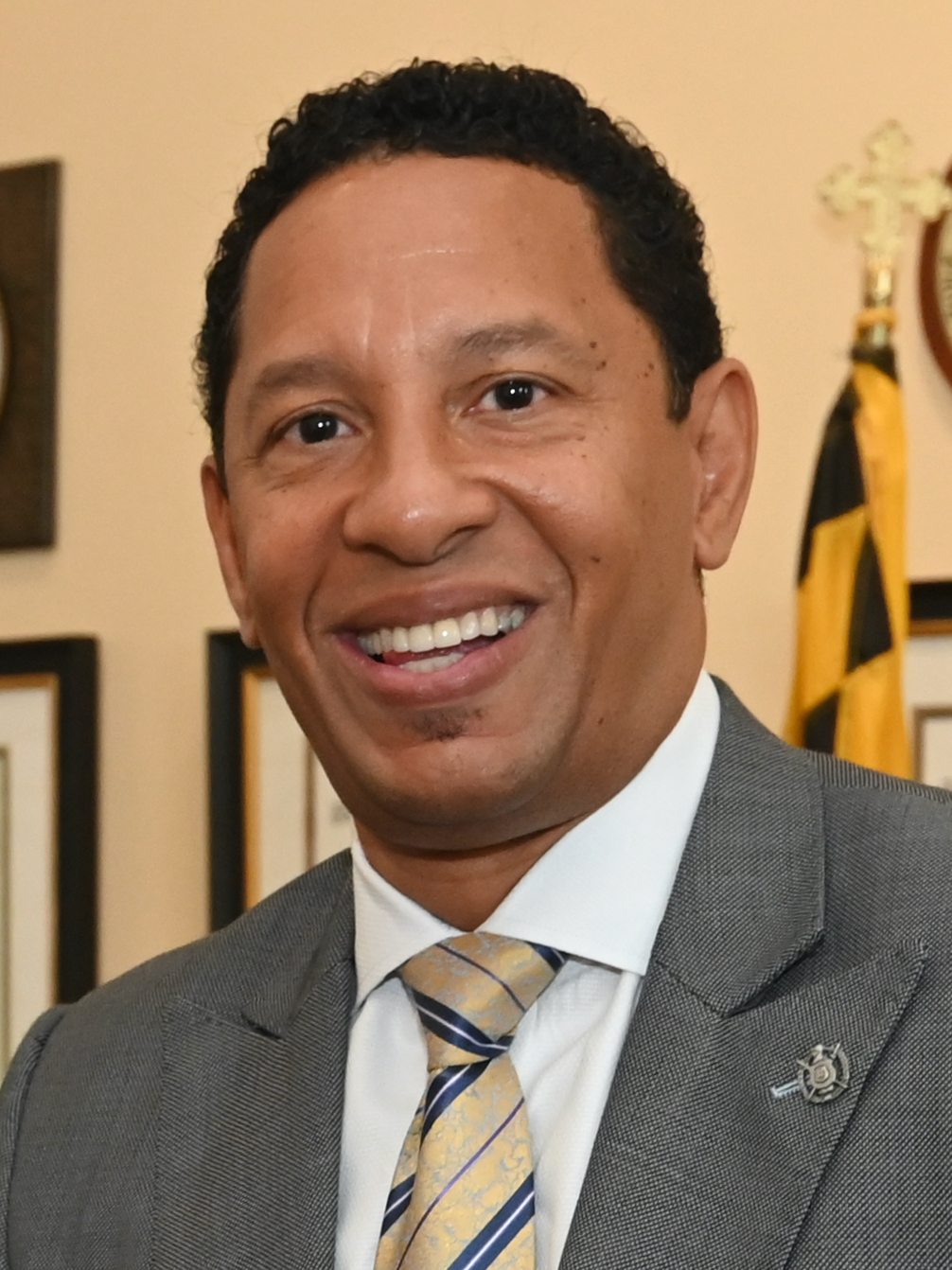
- Bates in October 2022

26th State's Attorney of Baltimore
- Incumbent
- Assumed office January 3, 2023
- Preceded by: Marilyn Mosby

Personal details
- Born: Ivan Jules Bates; September 1968 (age 58)
- Party: Democratic
- Spouse(s): Lana (div. 2021) Danielle Gomes (m. 2025)
- Education: Howard University (BA); William & Mary Law School (JD)
- Occupation: Defense attorney
- Website: Campaign website

Military service
- Branch/service: United States Army
- Years of service: 1986–1988
- Rank: Private first class
- Unit: 32nd Army Air and Missile Defense Command

Ivan Jules Bates (born September 1968) is an American politician and lawyer who has served as the State's Attorney of Baltimore since 2023.

== Early life ==
Bates was adopted by his parents, Henry and Cleora, in El Paso, Texas. Due to his father's service in the United States Air Force, his family moved several times, including to Germany, Virginia, and New Mexico, before finally settling in Hampton, Virginia, where Bates attended Bethel High School, where he graduated with a 1.9 GPA.

After graduating from high school, his father enlisted him in the United States Army, where he was assigned to the 32nd Army Air and Missile Defense Command and worked as a light wheel vehicle mechanic before reaching the rank of private first class. He was honorably discharged from the Army in 1988.

After leaving the military, he enrolled at Howard University, where he served as the second president of the Howard University Student Association before graduating with a bachelor's degree in journalism in 1992. Afterwards, he attended the William & Mary Law School, where he received his Juris Doctor degree in 1995. While at William & Mary, he clerked for the NAACP Legal Defense and Educational Fund. After graduating, Bates wanted to move back to Los Angeles, California, but his mother asked him to move to Baltimore to take care of his aunt Edna.

== Legal career ==
Bates started his legal career in Baltimore, working as a law clerk for Baltimore Circuit Court Judge David B. Mitchell. He later worked in the homicide division of the Baltimore State's Attorney's Office under state's attorney Patricia Jessamy from July 1996 to June 2002. He left to become a defense attorney for the law firm of Schulman, Treem, Kaminkow, and Ravenell, and worked on the U.S. Supreme Court case Maryland v. Blake.

In 2006, Bates started his own law firm of Bates & Garcia, P.C., in downtown Baltimore. He represented Baltimore Police sergeant Alicia D. White, one of six police officers charged in the arrest and death of Freddie Gray in April 2015, and several clients victimized by the corrupt Gun Trace Task Force, whose members in 2017 were federally indicted and convicted of racketeering. In June 2019, Bates testified before the commission to Restore Trust in Policing, recommending a number of state laws to prevent corruption in Baltimore's criminal justice system.

== State's Attorney of Baltimore City ==
=== Elections ===
==== 2018 ====
On August 26, 2017, Bates announced his candidacy for state's attorney of Baltimore, challenging incumbent state's attorney Marilyn Mosby. He ran on a platform of supporting community policing and curbing gun violence.

During the campaign, Kristien Miller, a supporter of Thiruvendran Vignarajah, filed a lawsuit against Bates alleging that he was not qualified to run for state's attorney. In March 2018, Baltimore Circuit Court Judge Lawrence Fletcher-Hill ruled that Bates had lived in the city since 2016 and was qualified to run for state's attorney.

In May 2018, Bates released a campaign ad in which he claimed that he had "never lost a murder case". He came under fire for this claim, as online court records show that Bates prosecuted eight murders and dropped five of them. Bates defended his claims by providing additional court records that list him as a prosecutor in homicide cases against Lynelle Whiting and Gregory Everett in 2001 and 2002 respectively. In June, he released a list of 11 more cases he claimed as "wins", four of which had ended in convictions. He later threatened to sue the two other candidates in the race, Vignarajah and Mosby, and the Baltimore Afro-American newspaper for defamation, calling the claims made by the candidates related to his murder cases were "absolute lies".

Bates was defeated in the Democratic primary on June 26, 2018, placing second behind Mosby with 28.1 percent of the vote.

==== 2022 ====
On November 18, 2021, Bates announced that he would again run for state's attorney, challenging incumbent state's attorney Marilyn Mosby.

Bates supports improving the technology used in the state's attorney's office, including software programs that would add subtitles to police body camera videos. He unveiled a prosecution plan in March 2022, which includes cracking down on gun violence and restarting prosecutions for nonviolent crimes such as drug possession, prostitution, and trespassing, promising mandatory prison sentences for people convicted on gun charges. He also sought to increase collaboration with the Baltimore Police Department to reduce violent crime. He stressed during the campaign that these policies did not mean the city would be returning to a tough-on-crime mindset that leads to mass incarceration, with many cases being funneled to diversion courts to connect people with alternative treatment services.

During the primary, Bates received endorsements from The Baltimore Sun, former Baltimore mayor Sheila Dixon, former mayoral candidate Mary J. Miller, Maryland Senate President Bill Ferguson, state delegate Luke Clippinger, and former state's attorney Greg Bernstein.

Bates defeated incumbent state's attorney Marilyn Mosby and Democratic challenger Thiruvendran Vignarajah in the Democratic primary on July 19, 2022, receiving 40.9 percent of the vote. Bates was to face Independent candidate Roya Hanna in the general election, but she dropped out and endorsed Bates shortly after his primary win, clearing his path to victory.

==== 2026 ====
During an interview on WBAL radio on November 19, 2025, Bates said that he would run for re-election for a second term as state's attorney. He ran for re-election unopposed.

=== Tenure ===
Bates was sworn in as state's attorney on January 3, 2023. On his first day in office, he reversed Mosby's non-prosecution policy for low-level offenses like drug possession, prostitution, and trespassing.

During Bates's tenure as state's attorney, Baltimore saw significant decreases in homicides, with the city recording its first year with less than 300 homicides since 2015 in 2023. Bates has also repeatedly clashed with Baltimore Mayor Brandon Scott, clashing on issues including the clearing of squeegee boys in the city's downtown, juvenile justice reforms, efforts to increase enforcement of quality-of-life crimes, and use the city's citation docket. The two have also clashed on the role of the Mayor's Office of Neighborhood Safety and Engagement (MONSE), with Bates claiming in January 2025 that MONSE's Group Violence Reduction Strategy (GVRS) had nothing to do with the city's reduction in homicides from 2023 to 2025, instead positing himself as the real leader of Baltimore's public safety team. In December 2025, Bates announced that his office would terminate is coordination efforts with the MONSE, issuing a letter outlining numerous complaints about the office and the programs it funds, which he said operate behind a "veil of secrecy". Bates also offered to create a task force including representatives from his office, the Baltimore Police Department, the Office of the Inspector General, and the city solicitor's office to work through his concerns with MONSE, which he said he hoped would make MONSE "understand the legal ramifications of some of its actions".

==== Legislation ====
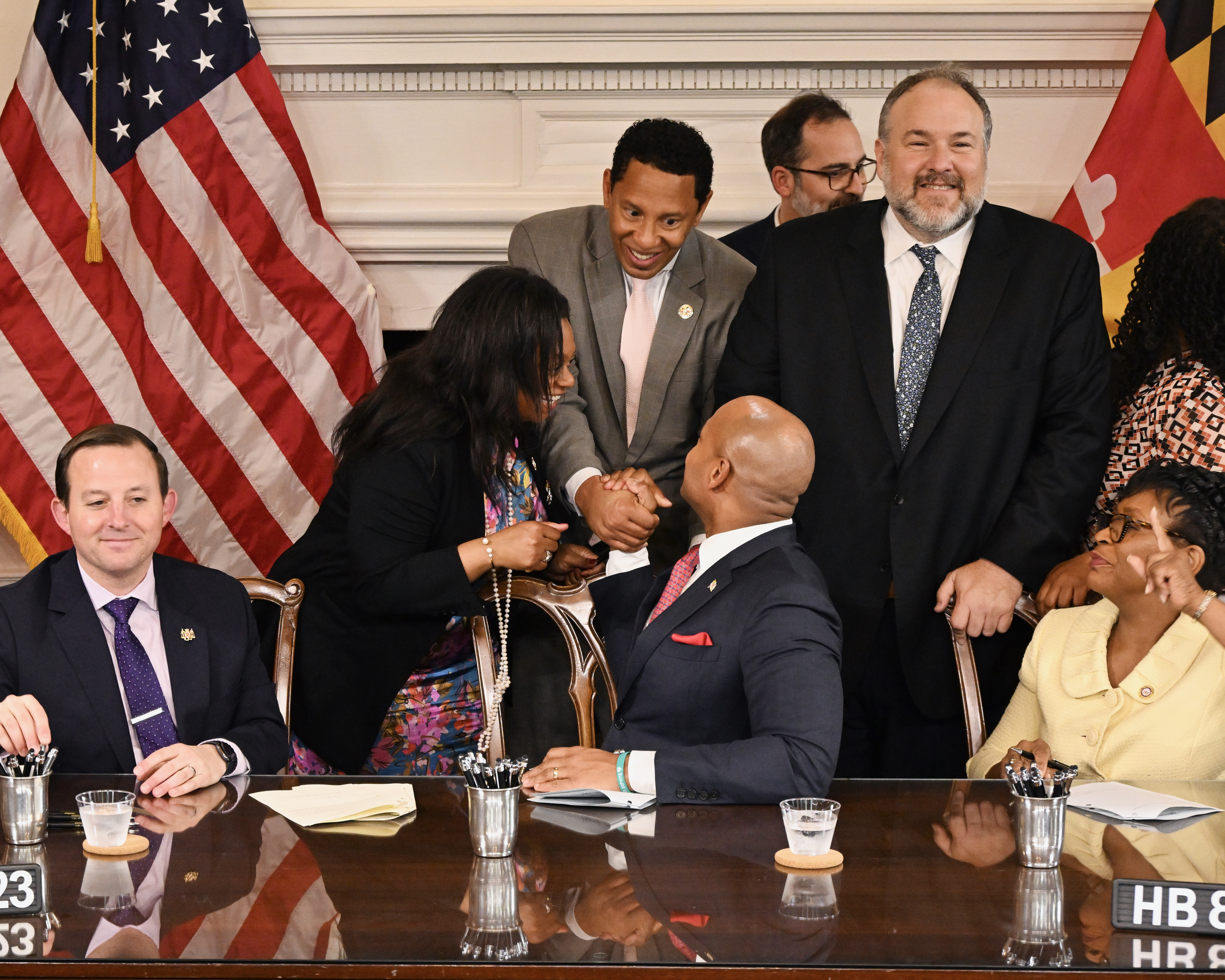
Governor Wes Moore signs Bates's gun sentencing bill, 2023

During the 2023 legislative session, Bates endorsed a bill to increase maximum sentences from three years to five years for people who illegally carry handguns, arguing that it would "ensure fairness under the law and serve as a deterrent". The bill was supported by all elected state's attorneys in Maryland, and opposed by the American Civil Liberties Union of Maryland, faculty of Baltimore law schools, and the Maryland Office of the Public Defender, who cited research from Johns Hopkins University which showed that longer sentences did not deter crime. The bill was later incorporated into the Gun Safety Bill of 2023, which was passed by the Maryland General Assembly in April, and signed into law by Governor Wes Moore in May 2023. In March 2023, Bates endorsed an anti-crime package introduced by the Maryland Republican Party, which included bills strengthening penalties for gun theft and repeat violent offenses.

During the 2024 legislative session, Bates supported legislation to extend probationary periods for gun crimes committed by juveniles, limit the Child Interrogation Protection Act, and allow state's attorneys to file a motion to modify an incarcerated individual's sentence "at any time".

During the 2026 legislative session, Bates opposed a bill that would end the practice of automatically charging youth as adults for certain crimes, saying that the bill "puts the interest of the accused juvenile offender ahead of the rights of the victims".

==== Prosecutions ====
In July 2022, Bates told The Baltimore Banner that he planned to drop the controversial case against Keith Davis Jr., who was scheduled for a fifth murder trial in the fatal shooting of Pimlico Race Course security guard Kevin Jones in 2015. He declined to comment on the case after winning the Democratic primary, saying that "[a]s State's Attorney-elect, I am no longer a private citizen. I must be mindful of the gag order imposed to the current State's Attorney and how it would ethically apply to me". On January 13, 2023, Bates ended the State's Attorney's office's prosecution of Davis, dropping all charges against him.

In July 2023, amid a mass shooting in Baltimore that killed two and injured 28, Bates released a statement expressing his condolences and calling for gun control and policies targeting repeat violent offenders.

In May 2018, Bates told the Rolling Stone that he would drop charges against Adnan Syed, the Serial podcast host who was serving life in prison for his initial conviction in the killing of Hae Min Lee in 1999. In February 2025, Bates announced that his office was withdrawing a previously filed motion to vacate Syed’s conviction. Bates however said he supported Syed's motion for a reduced sentence under the state's Juvenile Restoration Act, which provides a pathway to release for people serving long prison terms for crimes committed when they were minors. On March 6, Judge Jennifer Schiffer issued a decision that reduced Syed's sentence to time served so that the conviction would stand but that Syed would remain free.

== Personal life ==
Bates has two daughters named Brielle and London. He lives in the Locust Point community of Baltimore.

In 2021, Bates's third wife, Lana, filed for a divorce. In February 2025, he became engaged to Danielle "Dani" Gomes. They married on May 25, 2025.

Hours before Bates was sworn in as State's Attorney of Baltimore, he was hospitalized and treated for dehydration. Despite this, his swearing-in went as planned.

== Electoral history ==
Baltimore City State's Attorney Democratic primary election, 2018
Party	Candidate	Votes	%
Democratic	Marilyn Mosby (incumbent)	39,766	49.4
Democratic	Ivan Bates	22,619	28.1
Democratic	Thiru Vignarajah	18,130	22.5

Baltimore City State's Attorney Democratic primary election, 2022
Party	Candidate	Votes	%
Democratic	Ivan Bates	34,684	40.9
Democratic	Thiru Vignarajah	25,685	30.3
Democratic	Marilyn Mosby (incumbent)	24,415	28.8

Baltimore City State's Attorney election, 2022
Party	Candidate	Votes	%
Democratic	Ivan Bates	129,961	98.2
Write-in		2,417	1.8
