= John Causin =

American politician (1811-1861)

John M. S. Causin (1811 – January 30, 1861) was an American politician.

Causin was born in St. Mary's County, Maryland. He studied law, was admitted to the bar in Prince George's County, Maryland about 1836, and returned to St. Mary's County to practice. He served as a member of the Maryland House of Delegates in 1837 and again 1843, and was elected as a Whig to the Twenty-eighth Congress, serving from March 4, 1843, to March 3, 1845.

After his tenure in Congress, Causin moved to Annapolis, Maryland, and served as a delegate to the State constitutional convention. He later moved to Chicago, Illinois, in 1858 and resumed the practice of law. He died in Cairo, Illinois, and is interred in the City Cemetery (now Lincoln Park) of Chicago.

U.S. House of Representatives
| Preceded by Isaac Dashiell Jones | Member of the U.S. House of Representatives from Maryland's 1st congressional district March 4, 1843 – March 3, 1845 | Succeeded by John Grant Chapman |
