= Isaac D. Jones =

American politician (1806-1893)

Isaac Dashiell Jones
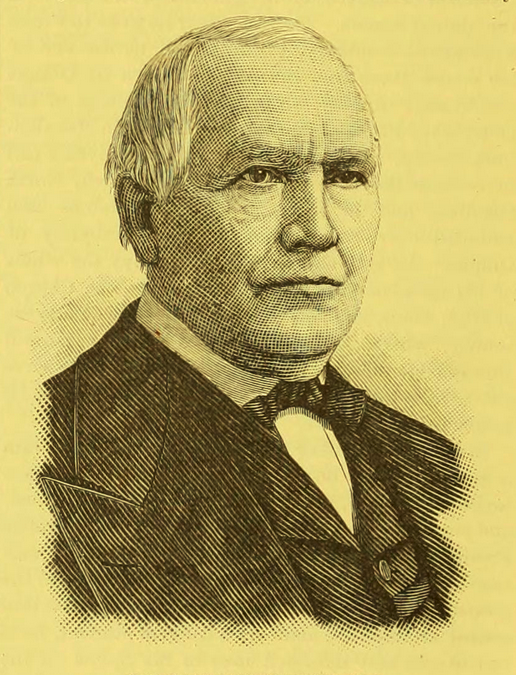

Member of the U.S. House of Representatives from Maryland's 1st district
- In office March 4, 1841 – March 3, 1843
- Preceded by: John Dennis
- Succeeded by: John Causin

15th Attorney General of Maryland
- In office 1867–1871
- Governor: Thomas Swann; Oden Bowie
- Preceded by: Alexander Randall
- Succeeded by: Andrew K. Syester

Member of the Maryland House of Delegates
- In office 1832, 1834, 1840–1841, 1867

Personal details
- Born: November 1, 1806 Somerset County, Maryland, U.S.
- Died: July 5, 1893 (aged 86) Baltimore, Maryland, U.S.
- Resting place: Green Mount Cemetery; Baltimore, Maryland, U.S.
- Party: Whig
- Spouse: Eliza Hays
- Occupation: Politician; lawyer

Isaac Dashiell Jones (November 1, 1806 – July 5, 1893) was a U.S. Congressman from Maryland, serving from 1841 to 1843.

== Early life ==
Isaac Dashiell Jones was born on the family homestead Wetipquin in Somerset County, Maryland, to Priscilla and Benjamin Jones. Jones completed preparatory studies and graduated from Washington Academy, where he became assistant tutor before his studies were completed. He studied law, was admitted to the bar, and commenced practice in Princess Anne.

== Career ==
Jones served as a member of the Maryland House of Delegates in 1832, 1834, 1840–1841, and 1867.

Jones was elected as a Whig from Maryland's 1st congressional district to the Twenty-seventh Congress, serving from March 4, 1841, to March 3, 1843. He took an active part in the Maryland constitutional conventions of 1864 and 1867, and was elected Attorney General of Maryland in 1867. He was later elected judge of the court of arbitration of Baltimore, Maryland, in 1877, and served as director of the Maryland School for the Deaf in Frederick, Maryland, from 1867 to 1893, and of the Maryland School for the Colored Blind and Deaf at Baltimore from 1872 to 1893.

== Personal life ==
Jones married Eliza Hays.

Jones died in Baltimore on July 5, 1893, and is interred in Green Mount Cemetery.

U.S. House of Representatives
Preceded by John Dennis	Member of the U.S. House of Representatives from Maryland's 1st congressional district 1841–1843	Succeeded by John Causin
Legal offices
Preceded by Alexander Randall	Attorney General of Maryland; 1867–1871	Succeeded by Andrew K. Syester
