= Stuart O. Simms =

American politician

- Born: July 17, 1950 (age 76); Baltimore, Maryland
- Occupation: Politician
- Known for: Ran unsuccessfully for the Democratic Party's nomination in the 2006 election for Attorney General of the state of Maryland

Stuart "Stu" O. Simms (born July 17, 1950) is a Maryland politician, who ran unsuccessfully for the Democratic Party's nomination in the 2006 election for Attorney General of the state of Maryland in the United States.

Simms was born in Baltimore, Maryland and attended the prestigious Gilman School in Baltimore. He received his undergraduate degree from Dartmouth College and his law degree from Harvard Law School.

In 1983, he was appointed Deputy State's Attorney of Baltimore City, serving until 1987. He was later elected to the position of State's Attorney and served two four-year terms from 1987 to 1995.

From 1995 to 2003, he served in the Cabinet of Governor Parris Glendening as Secretary of the Maryland Department of Juvenile Services from 1995 to 1997, and as Secretary of the Maryland Department of Public Safety and Correctional Services, one of the state's largest agencies, with 12,000 employees and a budget of $900 million from 1997 to 2003.

Simms worked for the Baltimore-based law firm Brown, Goldstein, and Levy from 2003 to 2020. Simms and his wife, Candace Simms, have two sons.

== 2006 Maryland Attorney General Primary election ==
Democratic
Candidate	Votes	Percent
Doug Gansler (winner)	286,016	55.7%
Stuart O. Simms	227,699	44.3%
Totals	513,715	100%
Source: Maryland State Board of Elections
