= Charles J. M. Gwinn =

American lawyer and politician (1822–1894)

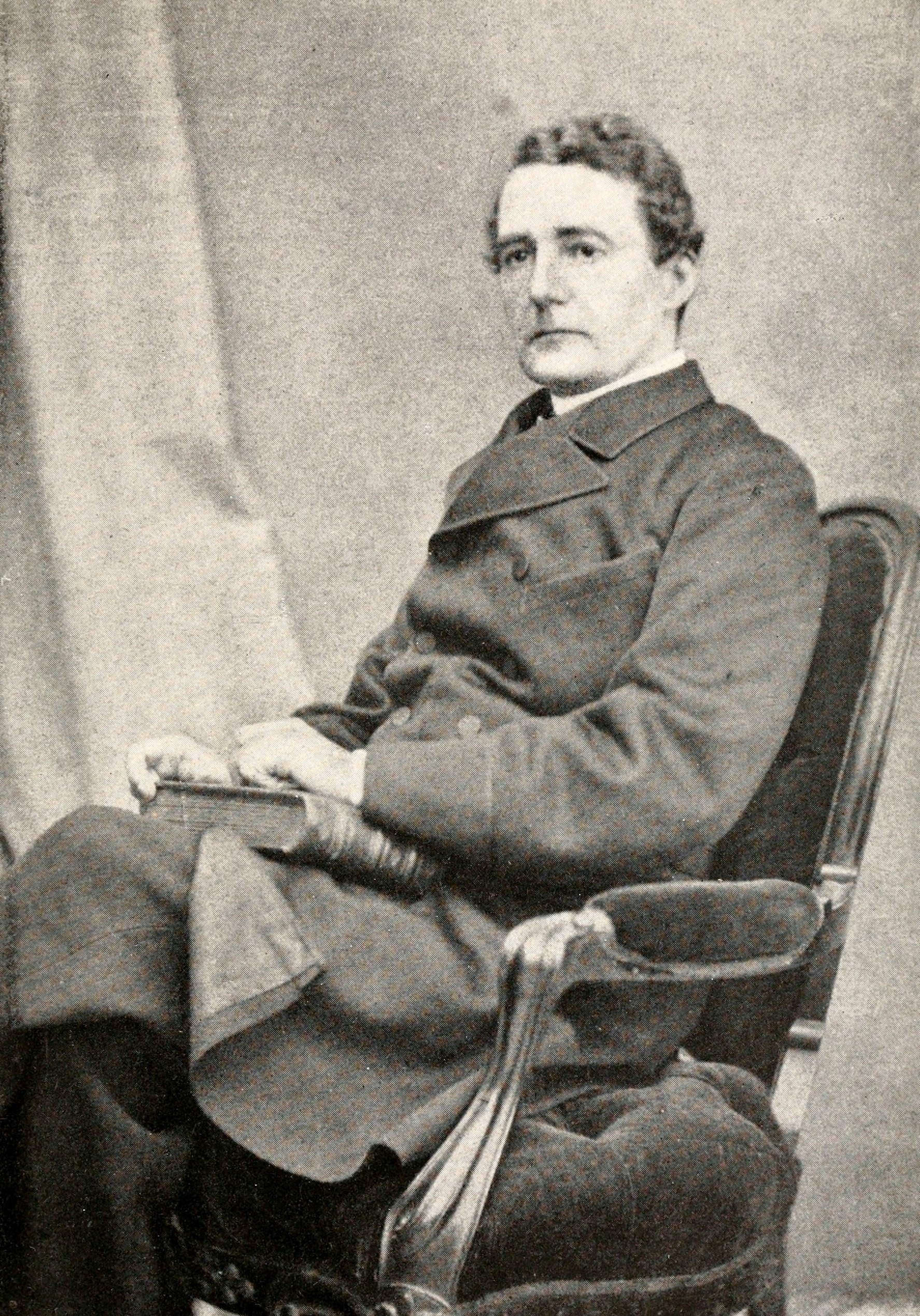

Attorney General of Maryland
- In office 1875–1883
- Governor: James Black Groome; John Lee Carroll; William Thomas Hamilton
- Preceded by: Andrew K. Syester
- Succeeded by: Charles B. Roberts

State's Attorney of Baltimore
- In office January 5, 1852 – January 8, 1856
- Preceded by: Position established
- Succeeded by: Milton Whitney Sr.

Member of the Maryland House of Delegates from Baltimore
- In office 1849–1849 Serving with Sidnor S. Donaldson, Oliver F. Hack, John Marshall, and Charles S. Spence
- Preceded by: Multi-member district
- Succeeded by: Multi-member district

Personal details
- Born: Charles John Morris Gwinn; October 21, 1822 Baltimore, Maryland, US
- Died: February 11, 1894 (aged 71) Baltimore, Maryland, US
- Resting place: Green Mount Cemetery
- Party: Democratic
- Spouse: Matilda Johnson (m. 1858)
- Children: Mary
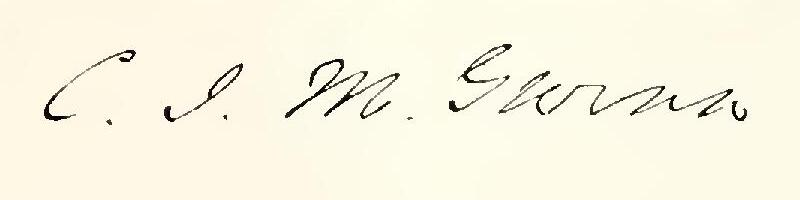
- Signature

Charles John Morris Gwinn (also spelled Gwin; October 21, 1822 – February 11, 1894) was an American lawyer and politician who served as attorney general of Maryland from 1875 to 1883. A member of the Democratic Party, Gwinn also served as the first state's attorney of Baltimore from 1852 to 1856 and as a member of the Maryland House of Delegates from Baltimore in 1849.

Gwinn was born in Baltimore; his father was a merchant. After attending the University of Maryland and Princeton University, he was admitted to the bar in 1843 and served a one-year term in the House of Delegates in 1849. He was a delegate to the convention that formed the Maryland Constitution of 1851 and the first state's attorney of Baltimore elected under that constitution. He took office in January 1852 and served one four-year term, declining to seek reelection in 1855 and being replaced by Milton Whitney Sr. After serving as state's attorney, he returned to law, where he was lead counsel for the Baltimore and Ohio Railroad and counsel for several other people and companies. He was elected attorney general of Maryland in 1875 and re-elected in 1879. He left office in 1883 and died of pneumonia in his Baltimore home in 1894.

== Early life ==
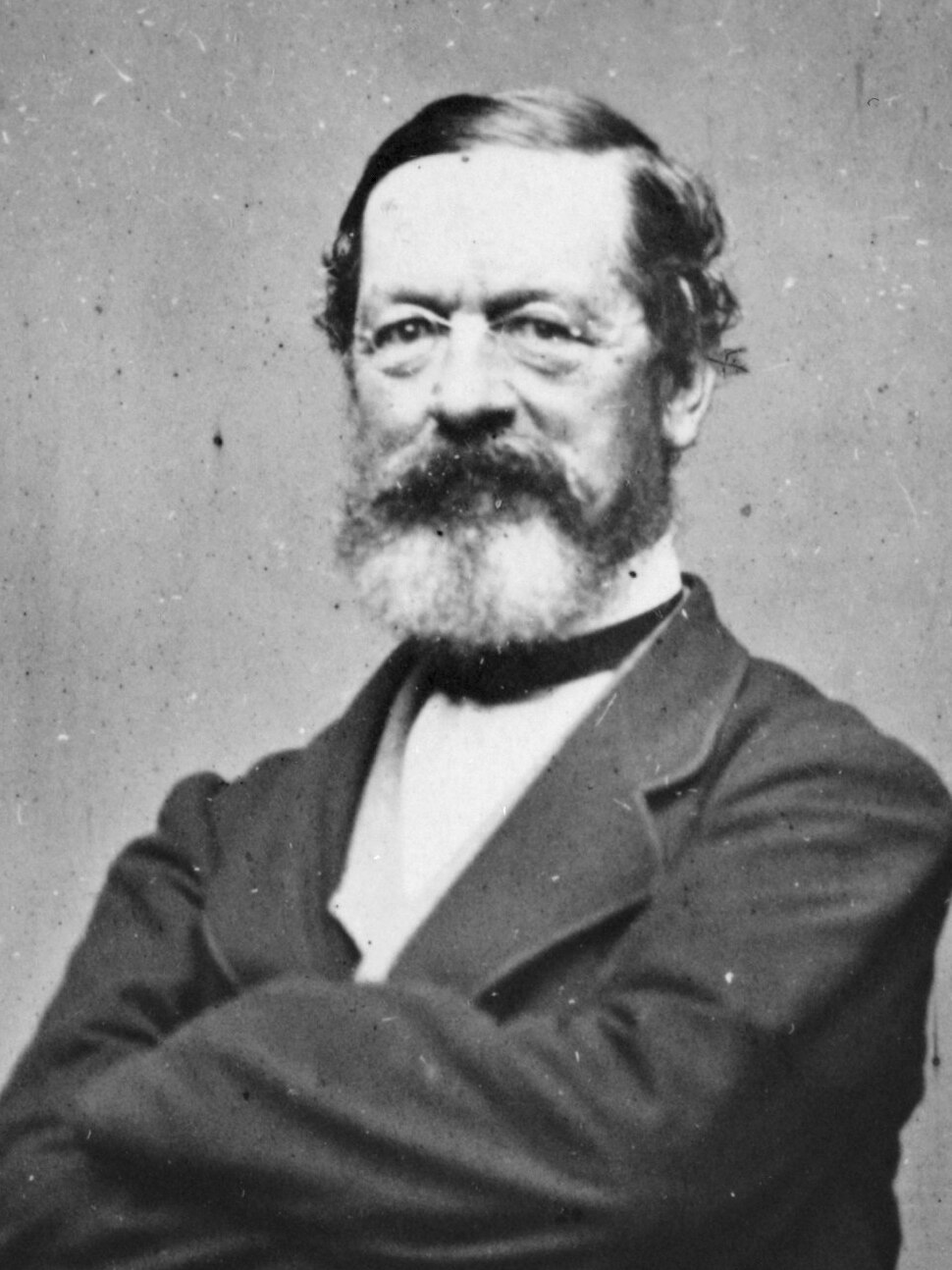
Gwinn studied law alongside John H. B. Latrobe.

Charles John Morris Gwinn was born October 21, 1822, in Baltimore, Maryland, to Charles, a merchant, and Eliza. He had three younger sisters, all of whom died unmarried and childless: Elizabeth M., Sarah M., and Emily Ann. He attended the University of Maryland, graduated from Princeton University in 1840, and studied law alongside lawyer and inventor John H. B. Latrobe.

== Early legal and political career (1843–1856) ==
Gwinn was admitted to the bar in 1843. His political career began as a member of the Maryland House of Delegates from Baltimore in 1849, serving alongside Sidnor S. Donaldson, Oliver F. Hack, John Marshall, and Charles S. Spence. Next year, he was a Baltimore delegate to the convention that formed the Maryland Constitution of 1851. He was elected as the first state's attorney of Baltimore in 1851, (Note: While Baltimore: Its History and Its People and the Maryland State Archives report Gwinn's participation in the constitutional convention and his election as state's attorney as in 1857 and 1858, respectively, newspapers of the time report those events as in 1850 and 1851.) defeating Whig candidate S. Teackle Wallis and taking office on January 5, 1852. While state's attorney, he was an elector for Franklin Pierce during the 1852 presidential election. Towards the end of Pierce's term, Gwinn was sent as a diplomat to Europe. He did not seek a second four-year term; his successor Milton Whitney Sr. took office on January 8, 1856.

== Later legal career (1856–1875) ==
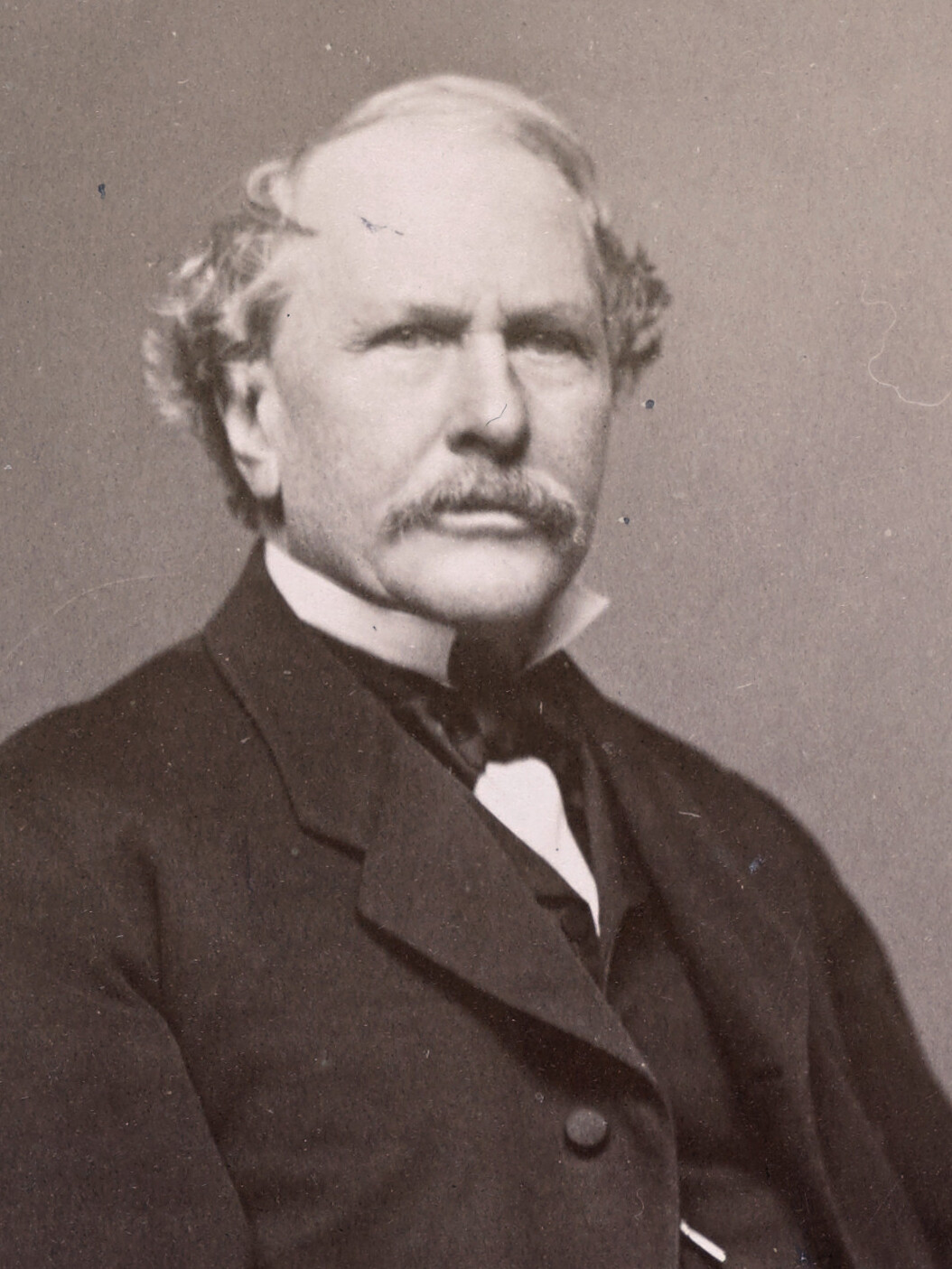
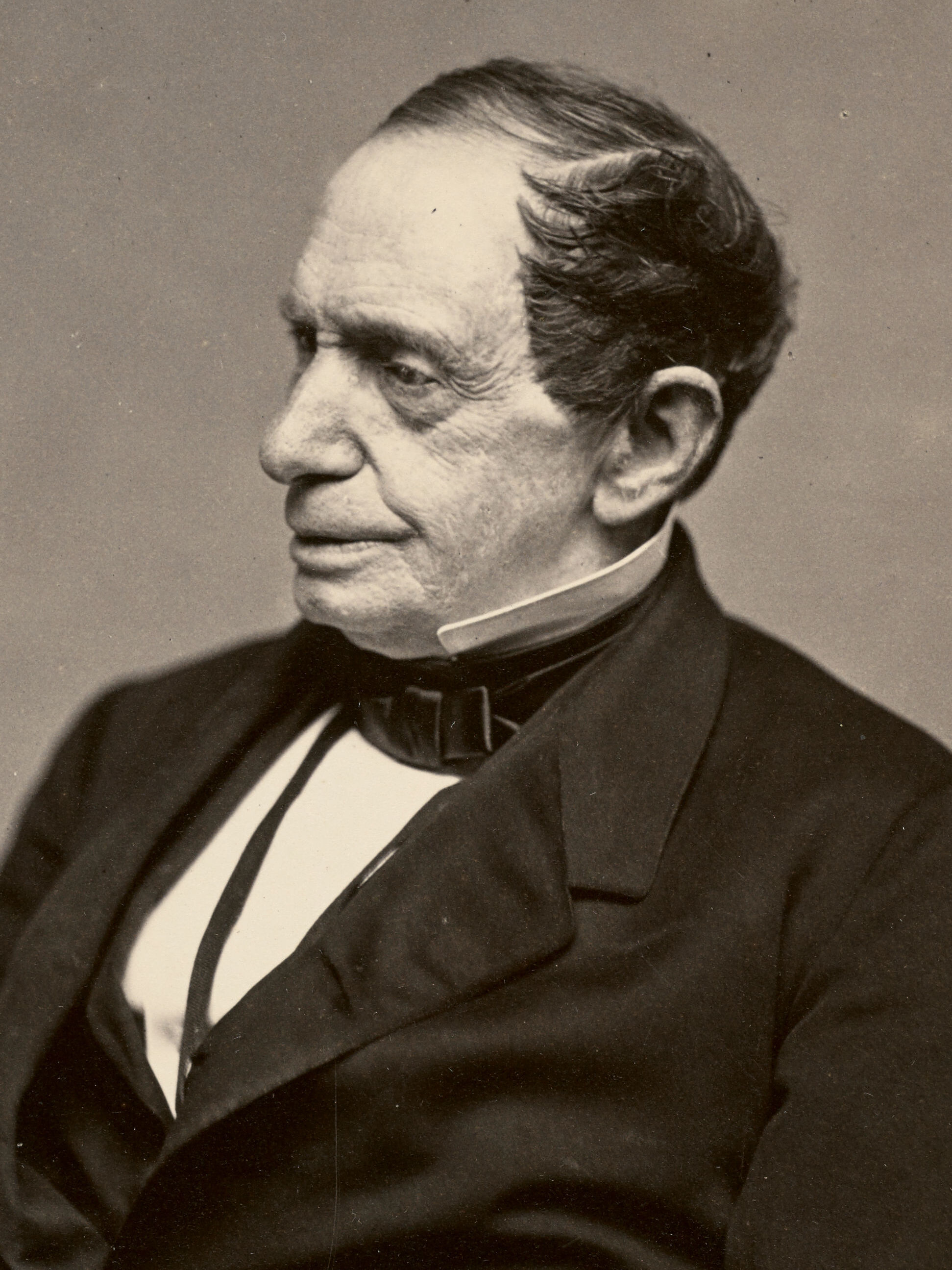
Gwinn was counsel for Arunah Shepherdson Abell (left) and Johns Hopkins (right).

After serving as state's attorney, Gwinn returned to law in 1856. He became the lead counsel alongside Latrobe for the Baltimore and Ohio Railroad and a counsel for several people, including Arunah Shepherdson Abell and Johns Hopkins, and companies, including C&P Telephone; Robert Garrett & Sons, a bank; and the Western Union Telephone Company. He helped draft Hopkins's will and later helped found the hospital and the university named after Hopkins, which he was one of the first trustees of.

== Attorney general of Maryland (1875–1883) ==
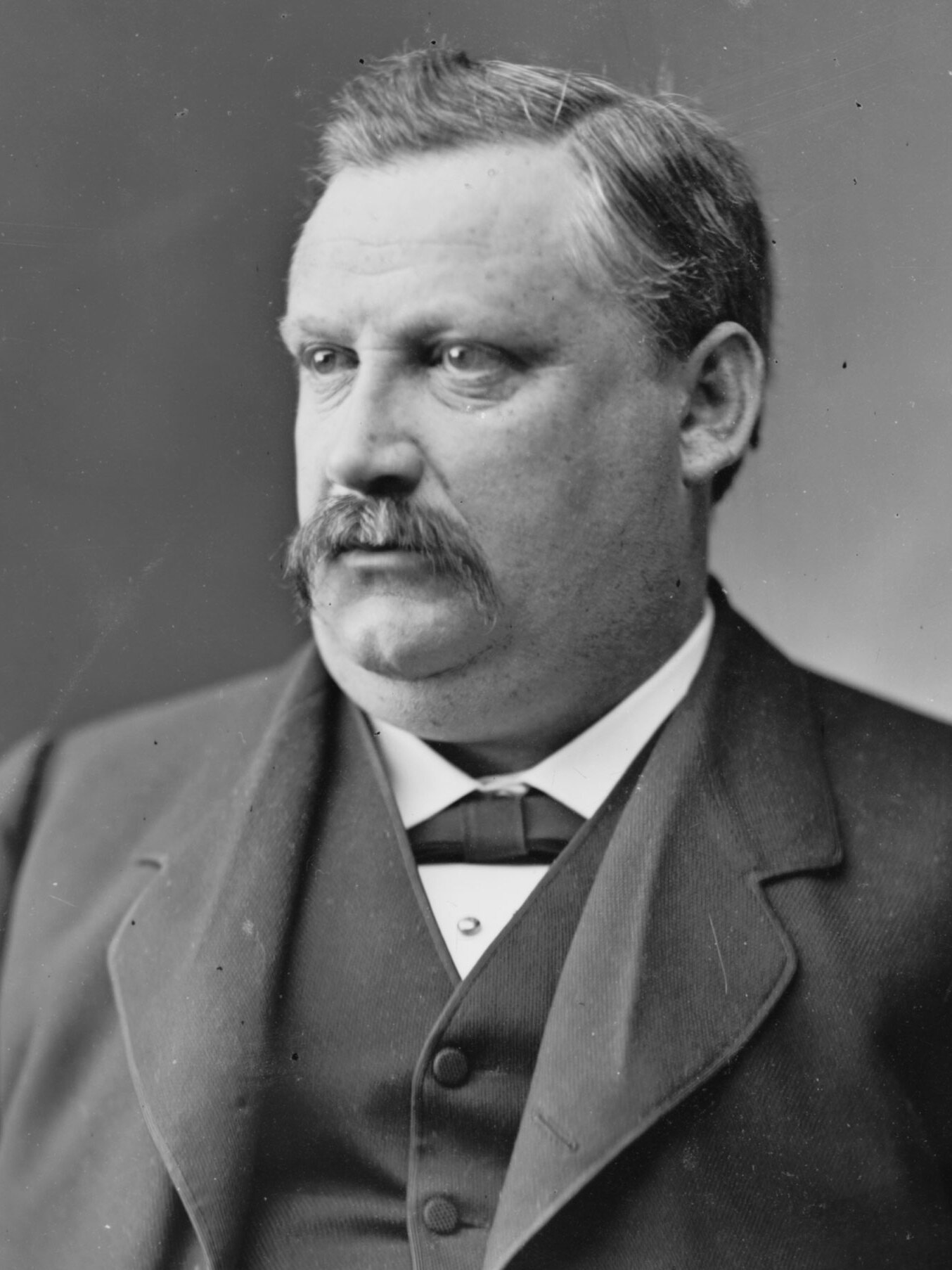
James Black Groome ruled in favor of Gwinn during the contested 1875 election.

In the 1875 election for attorney general of Maryland, Gwinn won the Democratic nomination at the Democratic State Convention on July 22, receiving 60 of 110 votes on the fourth ballot against four other candidates: Daniel Clarke from Prince George's County, Charles C. Goldsborough from Talbot County, W. H. Tuck from Anne Arundel County, and Frederick J. Nelson from Frederick County. In the general election held on November 2, Gwinn was declared the winner against the now-independent S. Teackle Wallis, which Wallis challenged, citing "fraud, intimidation, and violence" against him in Baltimore, which Gwinn won with 36,749 votes against Wallis's 22,473. Democratic governor of Maryland James Black Groome and the Maryland Court of Appeals (now the Supreme Court of Maryland) ruled in favor of Gwinn on December 6 and 21, respectively. He was re-elected in 1879.

== Personal life ==
Gwinn was a member of the Episcopal Church. He married Matilda Elizabeth Bowie Johnson, a daughter of U.S. Senator Reverdy Johnson, at St. Paul's Episcopal Church on January 26, 1858. They had one child, Mary "Mamie" Mackall Gwinn, in 1861; she married Alfred Hodder in 1904 and died childless in 1940.

Gwinn was a delegate to several Democratic National Conventions, including 1860, 1868, 1880, and 1884.

=== Death ===
After a period of illness starting on February 1, Gwinn died of pneumonia at his Baltimore home on February 11, 1894. His last public appearance was at the Maryland Court of Appeals (now the Supreme Court of Maryland) on February 2. After his death, governor of Maryland Frank Brown ordered the flags at the Maryland State House to be at half-mast. He is buried at Green Mount Cemetery.

== Notes ==
Legal offices
Preceded by Andrew K. Syester	Attorney General of Maryland; 1875–1883	Succeeded by Charles B. Roberts
New office	State's Attorney of Baltimore; 1852–1856	Succeeded by Milton Whitney Jr.
