= A. Robert Kaufman =

American socialist, civil rights activist, and perennial candidate (1931-2009)

- Born: March 8, 1931; Baltimore, Maryland, U.S.
- Died: December 25, 2009 (aged 78); Randallstown, Maryland, U.S.
- Political party: Democratic

Alan Robert Kaufman (March 8, 1931 – December 25, 2009) was an American socialist, civil rights activist, and perennial candidate in Baltimore, Maryland.

== Early life ==
Alan Robert Kaufman was born in Baltimore in 1931 into a middle-class Jewish family. He was the son of Frank Ezekiel and Helen (Leibowitz) Kaufman.

== Politics ==
Kaufman ran as a candidate in the Democratic primary for the 1986 United States Senate election in Maryland, losing to Barbara Mikulski. Kaufman received 6,505 votes, 1.05% of the ballots.

In 1999, Kaufman ran as a candidate in the Democratic primary of the 1999 Baltimore mayoral election. Losing to Martin O'Malley, he received 238, less than 0.1% of the vote. As a mayoral candidate, Kaufman proposed creating a red light district in Baltimore for legalized sex work. Kaufman also called for the decriminalization of drugs and the establishment of clinics to dispense drugs to drug addicts. Kaufman believed that decriminalization of prostitution and drugs would help reduce Baltimore's high rate of HIV and STI infections and help discourage the illegal drug market and related violence.

== Personal life ==
Kaufman never married or had children. In December 2005, a drug-addicted tenant attacked Kaufman at his Baltimore home with a brick, stabbed him, and stole his wallet. In September, the tenant was sentenced to three years in prison, pleading guilty to robbery with a deadly weapon. Kaufman spoke at the hearing, saying that his assailant should receive counseling and drug rehabilitation.

== Death ==
Kaufman died on December 25, 2009, at Northwest Hospital in Randallstown, Maryland. Kaufman had been undergoing kidney dialysis since his assault in 2005, which had caused his kidneys to fail. His sister Ruth Lipsetts was his sole surviving relative.
