= Robert C. Murphy (judge) =

American judge (1926–2000)

The Honorable Robert C. Murphy

Chief Judge of the Maryland Court of Appeals
- In office 1972–1996
- Appointed by: Marvin Mandel
- Preceded by: Hall Hammond
- Succeeded by: Robert M. Bell

Attorney General of Maryland
- In office 1966
- Preceded by: Thomas B. Finan
- Succeeded by: Francis B. Burch

Personal details
- Born: October 9, 1926 Baltimore, Maryland, U.S.
- Died: October 31, 2000 (aged 74) Timonium, Maryland, U.S.
- Party: Democratic
- Spouse: Helen Murphy
- Children: Karen, Thomas, and Kathy
- Parent(s): Leo Joseph Murphy and Eva (LaFontaine) Murphy
- Education: University of Maryland (J.D.)

Military service
- Allegiance: United States
- Branch/service: United States Navy
- Years of service: 1944–1946
- Unit: Nevada National Guard
- Battles/wars: World War II

Robert Charles Murphy (October 9, 1926 – October 31, 2000) was a Maryland lawyer and jurist. He served as Chief Judge of the Maryland Court of Appeals, the state's highest court, from 1972 to October 9, 1996, the same that day he turned 70 years old. Seventy is the Maryland State Constitution's mandatory retirement age for judges, which Murphy unsuccessfully attempted to raise to 75 years old. Murphy was 45 years old when he was appointed by then Governor Marvin Mandel, making Murphy the youngest chief judge in Maryland state history.

== Early life and career ==
Robert Charles Murphy was born in Baltimore and attended Baltimore public schools, including Forest Park Senior High School. He served in the United States Navy from 1944 to 1946. He graduated from the University of Maryland Law School with a Juris Doctor in 1951. In 1952, he was admitted to the Maryland bar.

From 1955 to 1966, Murphy worked for the office of the Attorney General of Maryland, and in 1966, became Attorney General. After his mandatory retirement as Chief Judge in 1996, the Maryland Court of Appeals building in Annapolis was renamed and dedicated in his honor as the Robert C. Murphy Courts of Appeal Building.

== Personal life ==
Murphy was married to Helen Murphy. They had three children, Karen, Thomas and Kathy, and seven grandchildren. His daughter, Karen Murphy Jensen, served as judge for the Circuit Court of Caroline County, Maryland from 1999 to 2016, and currently holds senior judge status. He was Catholic.

Legal offices
Preceded by Thomas B. Finan	Attorney General of Maryland; 1966	Succeeded by Francis B. Burch
Preceded by Hall Hammond	Chief Judge of the Maryland Court of Appeals; 1972–1996	Succeeded by Robert M. Bell
