= 2018 Maryland elections =

The 2018 Maryland elections were held on November 6, 2018. Voters elected offices at the federal, state, and local levels, including one United States Senate seat, all eight of the state's U.S. House seats, the governor, and every seat in the Maryland General Assembly.

== United States Senate ==
Incumbent Democratic Senator Ben Cardin won re-election to a third term, defeating Republican Tony Campbell with 64.9% of the vote to 30.3%.

== United States House of Representatives ==
All eight of Maryland’s congressional districts were contested; the party balance remained seven Democrats and one Republican.

== Governor ==
Republican incumbent Governor Larry Hogan was re-elected to a second term, defeating Democrat Ben Jealous with 55.4% of the vote to 43.5%.

== Maryland General Assembly ==
Elections were held for all seats in the Maryland State Senate and the Maryland House of Delegates.

== Ballot measures ==
Voters considered two statewide ballot questions:

- Question 1: Gambling Revenue Dedicated to Education Lockbox Amendment
- Question 2: Election-Day Voter Registration Amendment
