= Marshall College High School =

Erstwhile High School in Huntington,West Virginia

Coordinates: 38°25′23.1″N 82°25′38.4″W

Marshall College High School, also known as the Jenkins Laboratory School, was a high school in Huntington, West Virginia. It was a division of Marshall University, then still known as Marshall College. The school was established in 1932, and moved into a permanent facility in what is now known as the Education Building (Formerly known as Jenkins Hall) on the Marshall campus in 1938. The ostensible purpose was that the school was a demonstration or laboratory where teacher education majors could do "student teaching" and new education theories could be practiced. However, another purpose of the school was that the college found recruiting professors difficult as those with children were unwilling to send them to the public schools of that era. Such college affiliated schools were not uncommon in the south and midwest, as well as Upstate New York, of that era. West Virginia University operated a similar venture which later became University High School.

The school mostly drew students from among the children of professors and the wealthy of the Huntington community. The school fielded teams in various sports, using Marshall's facilities, mascot, and school colors, and competed against both public and private schools. As the quality of the public schools improved, the need for the school was diminished and the university closed it in 1970, and repurposed Jenkins Hall into the general university.

The school maintains an active alumni group which erected a memorial to its students killed in World War II in front of the Education Building.

Formerly known as Jenkins Hall, around 2019, student body and residents of the school petitioned to change the name of the building due to the building being named after Albert Gallatin Jenkins who was a confederate general. The name was changed to the Education Building due to the extreme racial intolerance Albert Gallatin Jenkins had expressed during his lifetime.
