= Francis B. Burch =

American lawyer and politician (1918–1987)

Attorney General of Maryland
- In office 1966–1978
- Governor: Spiro T. Agnew; Marvin Mandel
- Preceded by: Robert C. Murphy
- Succeeded by: Jon F. Oster

Personal details
- Born: Francis Boucher Burch; November 26, 1918 Baltimore, Maryland, U.S.
- Died: June 1, 1987 (aged 68) Baltimore, Maryland, U.S.
- Party: Democratic
- Education: Loyola College (BA); Yale University (JD)

Francis Boucher "Bill" Burch (November 26, 1918 – June 1, 1987) was an American politician who served as the Attorney General of Maryland from 1966 until 1978.

== Education ==
Burch, the son of L. Claude Burch and Constance Boucher, was born in Baltimore, Maryland and attended the public elementary and parochial schools in the city, graduating from the Baltimore City College high school in 1937. He received his A.B. degree from Loyola College where he graduated summa cum laude and first in his class in 1941. In 1943 he received his Juris Doctor degree from the Yale Law School and was fourth in his class.

== Background ==
During World War II he was a volunteer in the Port Security Force and then became an instructor at Loyola College until 1957. Roman Catholic. Married Mary Patricia Howe. He died in Towson, Baltimore County, June 1, 1987. While attending Baltimore City College, Burch was a member of student government, the lacrosse and tennis teams, yearbook committee, honor society, the Hi-Y club which sponsored school activities such as receptions for members of the schools sports teams, and finally as a senior in 1937, was a member of the prom and banquet committee. The Green Bag. Baltimore: Senior Class of Baltimore City College, 1937.

== Political career ==
Burch first ran for Maryland Attorney General in 1966. He was victorious, and won the elections for Attorney General in 1970 and 1974. He ran for Governor of Maryland in 1978, but was unsuccessful.

While Attorney General of Maryland, Burch, an advocate for higher education, would be influential in expanding student intern programs and law clerk programs in order to expose law students to the work, functions, and responsibilities of the Department of Law. Burch, Francis. Annual Report and Official Opinions of The Attorney General of Maryland. Baltimore: 20th Century Printing Company, 1973.

Throughout his life, Burch was always known as "Bill" and not as Francis or Frank. In 1978, Burch would finally have his name changed, legally inserting Bill into his formal name. Burch was quoted as saying Bill is a name in which I am "publicly and generally known."(1978, March 21).{Burch, Francis Boucher, 1918-} The Baltimore Sun, 1.

== Notes ==
Legal offices
| Preceded by Robert C. Murphy | Attorney General of Maryland; 1966–1978 | Succeeded by Jon F. Oster |
