= Maryland Attorney General =

Attorney general for Maryland, U.S.

Attorney General of the State of Maryland
- Seal of the Maryland Attorney General

- Flag of the State of Maryland

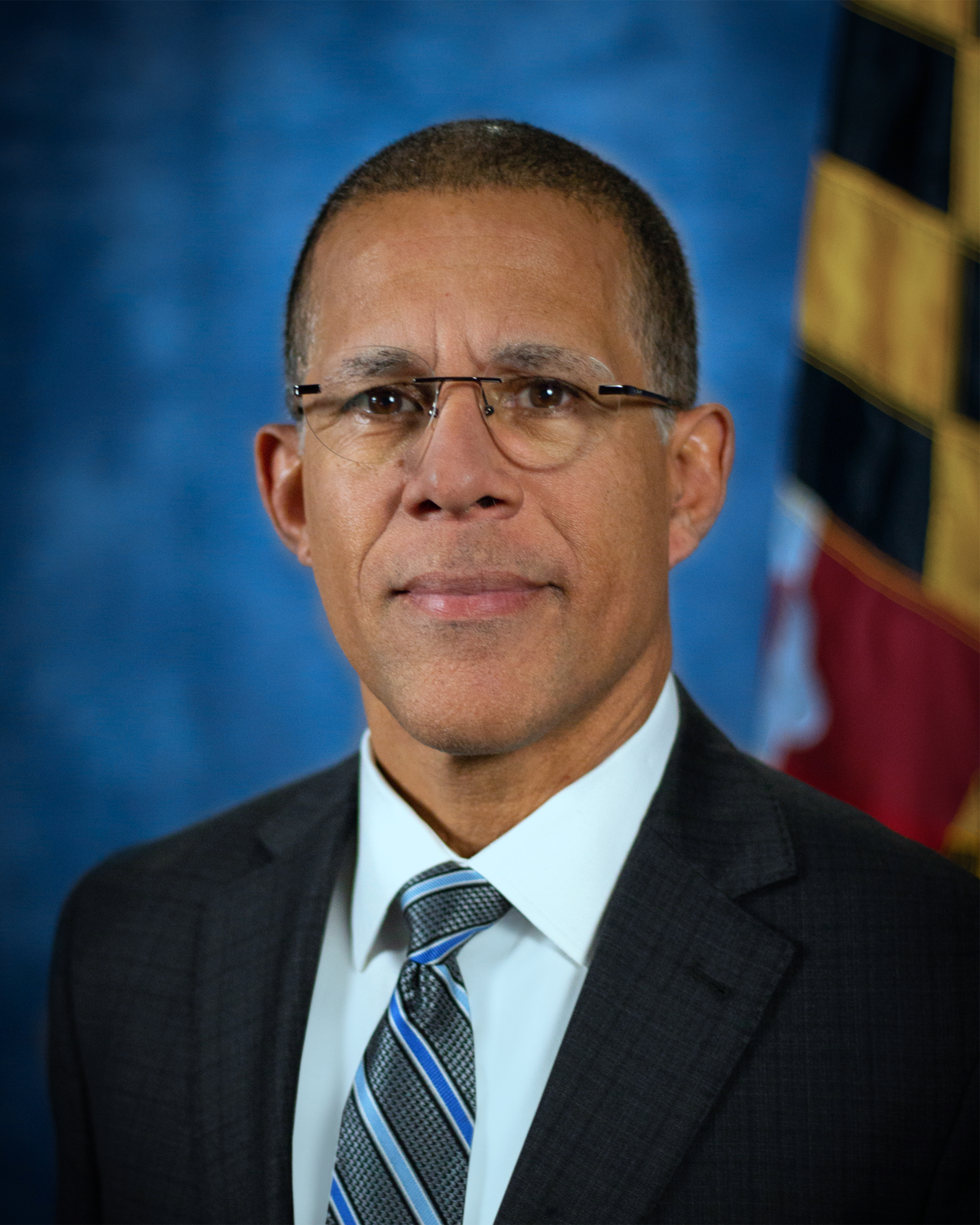
- Incumbent; Anthony Brown since January 3, 2023
- Style: The Honorable
- Term length: Four years, no term limit
- Inaugural holder: James Tilghman; 1777
- Formation: Maryland Constitution of 1776 (originally); Maryland Constitution of 1864 (most recently)
- Website: oag.maryland.gov

The Attorney General of the State of Maryland is the chief legal officer of the U.S. state of Maryland, serving as the state's primary prosecutor and legal representative.

The current attorney general is Anthony Brown, who was elected in 2022 and has served since 2023.

== Selection and qualifications ==
Like most state attorneys general, the attorney general is elected by statewide vote every four years. The officeholder serves a four-year term and is eligible for re-election with no term limits. As with all statewide offices in Maryland, the attorney general is elected on even-numbered years when there is no election for the president of the United States.

To run for the office, a person must be a citizen of and qualified voter in Maryland and must have lived and practiced law in the state for at least ten years. If the office becomes vacant, the Governor appoints a replacement to serve the remainder of the term.

== Functions and responsibilities ==
The attorney general has general charge, supervision and direction of the legal business of the State. The main constitutional duties of the attorney general are to enforce the rule of law and to provide legal counsel and representation to the state of Maryland.

The attorney general is the legal advisor and representative of the governor, the General Assembly, the judiciary, and all state departments, various boards, commissions, officials, and institutions of state government. Notably, the governor cannot employ additional legal counsel without legislative authorization.

The office consists of fourteen Central Divisions and fifty-six state agency client units. The office provides written legal opinions interpreting state law to the General Assembly, the governor, and other state and local elected officials. Administrative rules and regulations promulgated by state agencies, and bills passed by the General Assembly, are reviewed by the office and defended in court when necessary.

=== Litigation ===
The attorney general and assistant attorneys general represent the state of Maryland in all legal cases. This includes representing the state before the Maryland Circuit Courts, the Appellate Court of Maryland, the Supreme Court of Maryland, the U.S. Court of Appeals for the Fourth Circuit, the U.S. District Court for the District of Maryland, and in the United States Supreme Court.

The attorney general represents state agencies, officials, and employees in civil lawsuits and defends the constitutionality of state laws when challenged.

=== Law enforcement ===
The attorney general is charged with the enforcement of various laws and to investigate and prosecute a broad range of criminal acts occurring against and within state government.

==== Criminal Division ====
The Criminal Division investigates and prosecutes crimes by state employees, fraud against the state, public corruption, gun trafficking, and organized or multi-jurisdictional crimes.

==== Independent Investigations Division ====
Established by the General Assembly in 2021, the Independent Investigations Division investigates police-involved deaths or critical injuries that occur in Maryland. Since October 1, 2023, the Division has the authority to prosecute involved law enforcement officers.

==== Support to local prosecutors ====
The attorney general is charged with providing assistance to local state's attorneys when they require additional resources or specialized expertise, or when directed by the governor or General Assembly.

=== Consumer and public protection ===
==== Consumer Protection Division ====
The Consumer Protection Division offers mediation between complainants and businesses, investigates and prosecutes illegal business practices, and registers home builders and health clubs. The division also provides educational materials for Maryland residents.

The attorney general may bring an action to restrain a foreign limited liability company from doing business in this state. The attorney general may obtain a court order prohibiting the guarantor or service contract provider from further violations in this state.

==== Securities and investment protection ====
The Securities Division protects Maryland investors from fraud, and administers the Maryland Securities Act, Franchise Registration and Disclosure Law, and Business Opportunities Sales Act.

==== Healthcare fraud prevention ====
The Medicaid Fraud and Vulnerable Victims Unit investigates and prosecutes healthcare provider Medicaid fraud, waste, and abuse.

=== Board and commission memberships ===
By law, the attorney general, or his or her designee, serves on the School Safety Subcabinet and chairs the Maryland Cybersecurity Council, the Commission on Hate Crimes Response and Prevention, and the Maryland Sexual Assault Evidence Kit Policy and Funding Committee.

== Notable actions ==
=== Tobacco Master Settlement ===
Maryland was the eighth state to sue the major tobacco manufacturers over the public health costs of smoking. Under Attorney General J. Joseph Curran Jr., the state joined the 1998 Tobacco Master Settlement Agreement, under which the four largest cigarette makers agreed to pay Maryland more than $4 billion over 25 years, beginning with an initial payment of $54 million.

=== Litigation against the first Trump administration ===
Until 2017, Maryland law required the attorney general to obtain permission from the governor or General Assembly before suing the federal government, a requirement dating to the office's restoration under the Constitution of 1864. In February 2017, after Governor Larry Hogan did not respond to Attorney General Brian Frosh's request to challenge the Trump administration's travel ban, the General Assembly passed the Maryland Defense Act of 2017, a joint resolution granting the attorney general independent authority to sue the federal government. Frosh subsequently joined or filed more than 20 lawsuits against the federal government by late 2018, on subjects including the 2020 census citizenship question, environmental rollbacks, and immigration policy. In District of Columbia and Maryland v. Trump (2017), Frosh and D.C. Attorney General Karl Racine alleged that President Trump's business holdings violated the Constitution's foreign and domestic emoluments clauses; the case was dismissed as moot after Trump left office in 2021.

=== Archdiocese of Baltimore report ===
In April 2023, following a four-year grand jury investigation begun under Frosh in 2018, Attorney General Anthony Brown released a report finding that 156 clergy and other personnel of the Archdiocese of Baltimore had sexually abused more than 600 children from the 1940s through 2002, and that archdiocese leadership had failed to report allegations or remove abusers. In April 2026, the Supreme Court of Maryland ruled that the state could not publicly identify individuals named in the report who had not been indicted.

=== Litigation against the second Trump administration ===
Brown first sued the second Trump administration on January 21, 2025, the day after the president's inauguration, joining a multistate suit challenging an executive order ending birthright citizenship for children of undocumented immigrants. As of May 2026, Brown had filed or joined 62 lawsuits against the administration, typically in coalitions of Democratic state attorneys general, on subjects including federal funding conditions, immigration enforcement, and education policy. Critics, including Maryland Republicans, have characterized the volume of litigation as politically motivated.

== List of Maryland attorneys general ==
=== Colonial period ===
Colonial attorneys general of Maryland
Image	Name	Term	Home
	Lt. Richard Smith, Sr.	1657–1660/61	Calvert County
	Capt. Thomas Manning	1660/61–1666	Calvert County
	Col. William Calvert	1666–1670	St. Mary's City
	Col. Vincent Lowe	1670–1676	Talbot County
	Kenelm Cheseldyne	1676–1681	St. Mary's City
	Thomas Burford	1681–1686/87	Charles County
	Robert Carvile	1688	St. Mary's City
	Charles Carroll	1688–1689	St. Mary's City & Anne Arundel County
	Col. George Plater, I	1691–1692	St. Mary's County
	Edward Wynn	1692	St. Mary's County
	Col. George Plater, I	1692–1698	St. Mary's County
	Maj. William Dent	1698–1704	Charles County
	Col. William Bladen	1704–1718	Annapolis
	Thomas Bordley	1718–1721	Annapolis
	Daniel Dulany, Sr.	1721–1725	Annapolis
	Michael Howard	1725–1734	Talbot County
	Daniel Dulany, Sr.	1734–1744	Annapolis
	Henry Darnall, III	1744–1756	Prince George's County
	Stephen Bordley	1756–1763	Annapolis
	Edmund Key	1764–1766	Annapolis
	Robert Goldsborough, II	1766–1768	Dorchester County
	Thomas Jennings	1768–1776	Annapolis

=== Modern attorneys general ===
Modern attorneys general of Maryland
Image	Name	From	To	Party	Law school
	James Tilghman	1777	1778		
	Luther Martin	1778	1805		
	William Pinkney	1805	1806	Democratic-Republican	
	John Thomson Mason	1806	1806		
	John Johnson, Sr.	1806	1811		
	John Montgomery	1811	1818	Democratic-Republican	
	Luther Martin	1818	1822		
	Thomas Beale Dorsey	1822	1824	Democratic-Republican	
	Thomas Kell	1824	1827		
	Roger B. Taney	1827	1831	Democratic	
	Josiah Bayly	1831	1846		
	George R. Richardson	1846	1851		
	Robert J. Brent	1851	1864	Whig	
	Alexander Randall	1864	1867	Whig	
	Isaac Dashiell Jones	1867	1871	Whig	
	Andrew K. Syester	1871	1875	Whig	
	Charles J. M. Gwinn	1875	1883	Democratic	
	Charles Boyle Roberts	1883	1887	Democratic	
	William Pinkney Whyte	1887	1891	Democratic	Harvard Law School
	John Prentiss Poe	1891	1895	Democratic	
	Harry M. Clabaugh	1895	1899	Republican	University of Maryland School of Law
	George Riggs Gaither Jr.	1899	1899	Republican	
	Isidor Rayner	1899	1903	Democratic	University of Virginia School of Law
	William Shepard Bryan Jr.	1903	1907	Democratic	University of Virginia School of Law
	Isaac Lobe Straus	1907	1911	Democratic	University of Maryland School of Law
	Edgar Allan Poe	1911	1915	Democratic	University of Maryland School of Law
	Albert Ritchie	1915	1919	Democratic	University of Maryland School of Law
	Ogle Marbury (acting)	1918	1919	Democrat	University of Maryland School of Law
	Alexander Armstrong	1919	1923	Republican	University of Pennsylvania Law School
	Thomas H. Robinson	1923	1930	Democratic	
	William Preston Lane Jr.	1930	1934	Democratic	University of Virginia School of Law
	Herbert O'Conor	1934	1938	Democratic	University of Maryland School of Law
	William C. Walsh	1938	1945	Democratic	Catholic University School of Law
	William Curran	1945	1946	Democratic	University of Maryland School of Law
	Hall Hammond	1946	1952	Democratic	University of Maryland School of Law
	Edward D. E. Rollins	1952	1954	Republican	University of Maryland School of Law
	C. Ferdinand Sybert	1954	1961	Democratic	University of Maryland School of Law
	Thomas B. Finan	1961	1966	Democratic	University of Maryland School of Law
	Robert C. Murphy	1966	1966	Democratic	University of Maryland School of Law
	Francis B. Burch	1966	1978	Democratic	Yale Law School
	Jon F. Oster	1979	1979	Democratic	University of Maryland School of Law
	George A. Nilson	1979	1979	Democratic	Yale Law School
	Stephen H. Sachs	1979	1987	Democratic	Yale Law School
	J. Joseph Curran Jr.	1987	2007	Democratic	University of Baltimore School of Law
	Doug Gansler	2007	2015	Democratic	University of Virginia School of Law
	Brian Frosh	2015	2023	Democratic	Columbia Law School
	Anthony Brown	2023		Democratic	Harvard Law School

== See also ==
- Government of Maryland
- Law of Maryland
