= 2010 Maryland gubernatorial election =

- November 2, 2010
- Turnout: 54.02% ▼3.51%
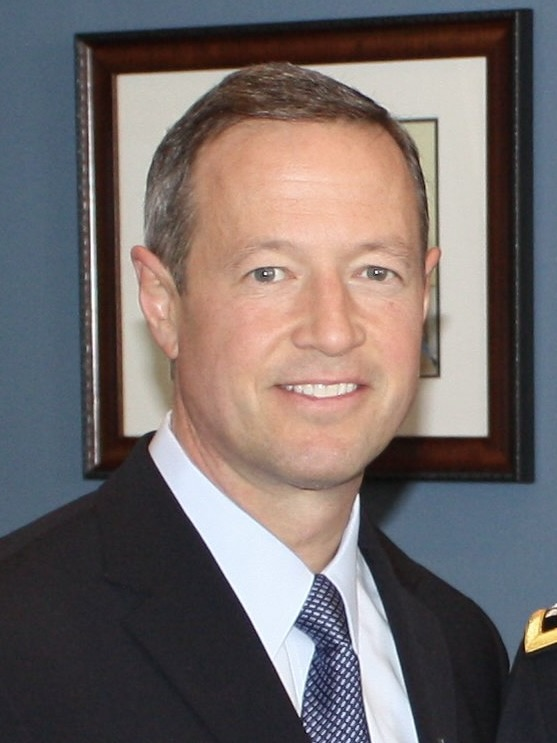

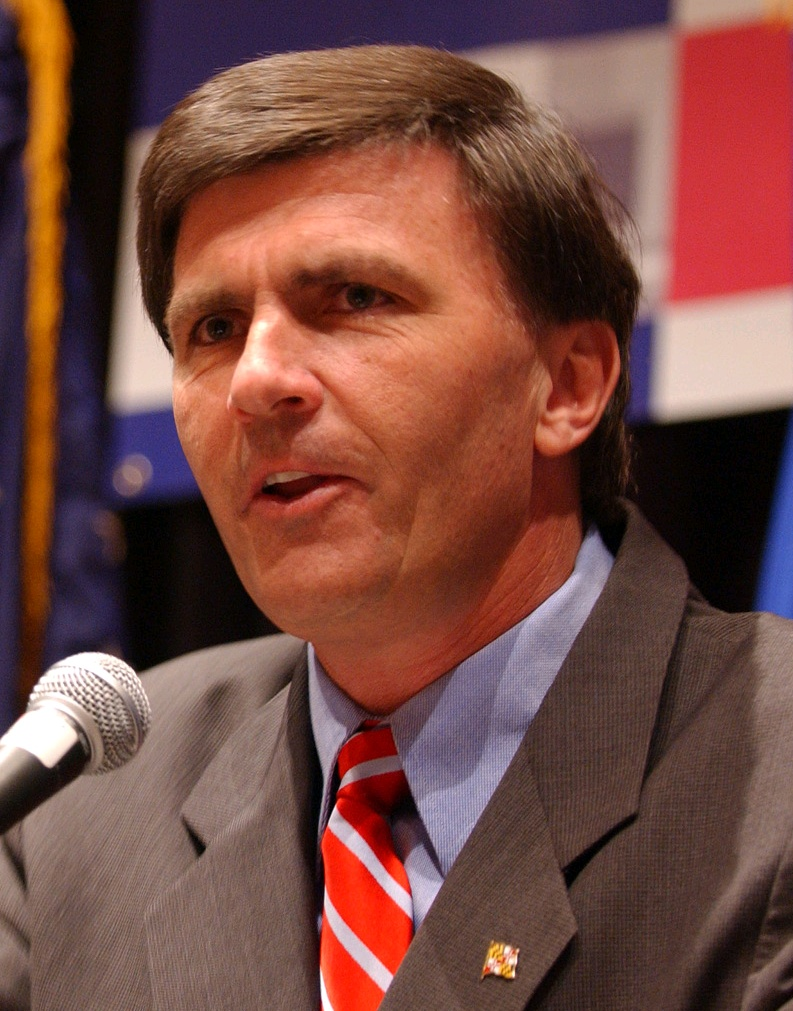
Nominee	Martin O'Malley	Bob Ehrlich
Party	Democratic	Republican
Running mate	Anthony Brown	Mary Kane
Popular vote	1,044,961	776,319
Percentage	56.24%	41.79%
- O'Malley: 40–50% 50–60% 60–70% 70–80% 80–90% >90% Ehrlich: 40–50% 50–60% 60–70% 70–80% 80–90% >90% Tie: 40–50% 50%
Governor before election
Martin O'Malley
Democratic
Elected Governor
Martin O'Malley
Democratic

The 2010 Maryland gubernatorial election was held on November 2, 2010. The date included the election of the governor, lieutenant governor, and all members of the Maryland General Assembly. Incumbent Democratic Governor Martin O'Malley and Lieutenant Governor Anthony Brown won election to a second term in office, defeating Republican former Governor Bob Ehrlich and his running mate Mary Kane.

Ehrlich had previously lost to O'Malley in 2006. O'Malley and Brown became the first gubernatorial ticket in Maryland history to receive more than a million votes.

While Ehrlich won a clear majority of Maryland's counties, he lost in the area between Baltimore and Washington, which accounts for more than 90% of the state's population. This allowed O'Malley to win by a relatively large margin of 14.4%.

== Background ==
In his first term as governor of Maryland, Martin O'Malley had made accomplishments, including raising total state tax collections by 14%. In April 2009 he signed the traffic speed camera enforcement law. He had supported raising revenue to try to overcome an imminent state deficit. Through his strenuous lobbying, he also implemented on a statewide level, Maryland StateStat One, the same CitiStat system he used to manage the city of Baltimore as mayor. One off his first actions as governor was to close the Maryland House of Corrections in Jessup, a notoriously violent maximum-security prison. By 2010, O'Malley's approval ratings had reached 55%, making his chances of reelection very good.

== Democratic primary ==
In the Democratic primary O'Malley faced J. P. Cusick and Ralph Jaffe, placing him in an unusual position, as he had run unopposed in the 2006 Democratic primary. He benefited from being the incumbent, and he handily defeated them in the primary. O'Malley received 86.3% of the vote. Cusick came in second with 9.7%, and Jaffe finished in last place with 5% of the vote. O'Malley again chose incumbent Democratic Lieutenant Governor Anthony Brown as his running mate.

=== Candidates ===
- J. P. Cusick
  Running mate: Michael Lange
- Ralph Jaffe, teacher and perennial candidate
  Running mate: Freda Jaffe
- Martin O'Malley, incumbent governor
  Running mate: Anthony Brown, incumbent lieutenant governor

=== Results ===
Results by county: O'Malley—≥90% O'Malley—80–90% O'Malley—70–80%

Democratic primary results
Party	Candidate	Votes	%
Democratic	Martin O'Malley (incumbent)	414,595	86.28
Democratic	J. P. Cusick	46,411	9.66
Democratic	Ralph Jaffe	19,517	4.06
Total votes		480,523	100

== Republican primary ==
The frontrunner for the Republican primary was former Republican Governor (and O'Malley's predecessor) Bob Ehrlich. He faced Brian Murphy in the primary. Like O'Malley, Erlich had also run unopposed in the 2006 Republican primary. Ehrlich easily defeated Murphy in the Republican primary by a margin of 75.8%-24.2%. He chose his former Secretary of State Mary Kane as his running mate.

=== Candidates ===
- Bob Ehrlich, former governor

- Running mate: Mary Kane, former Maryland secretary of state

- Brian Murphy, businessman

- Running mate: Mike Ryman, former federal and congressional inspector and candidate for the State Senate in 2006
- Former running mate: Carmen Amedori, former state delegate

=== Results ===
Results by county: Ehrlich—80–90% Ehrlich—70–80% Ehrlich—60–70%

Republican primary results
Party	Candidate	Votes	%
Republican	Bob Ehrlich	211,428	75.84
Republican	Brian Murphy	67,364	24.16
Total votes		278,792	100

== Minor party candidates ==
=== Constitution Party ===
- Eric Delano Knowles

- Running mate: Michael Hargadon

=== Green Party ===
- Maria Allwine

- Running mate: Ken Eidel

=== Libertarian Party ===
- Susan Gaztanaga

- Running mate: Doug McNeil

== General election ==
=== Predictions ===
Source	Ranking	As of
Cook Political Report	Tossup	October 14, 2010
Rothenberg	Likely D	October 28, 2010
RealClearPolitics	Likely D	November 1, 2010
Sabato's Crystal Ball	Likely D	October 28, 2010
CQ Politics	Lean D	October 28, 2010

=== Polling ===
Polling for the election overwhelmingly showed O'Malley would be reelected. The first poll taken in September 2009 showed him with an 11-point lead over Ehrlich. Throughout the election, only a few polls showed Ehrlich with a lead. By the last few months of the campaign, O'Malley held a strong double-digit lead over Ehrlich. The last poll taken showed him with a 10-point lead over Ehrlich: 52%-42%.

Poll source	Dates administered	Bob Ehrlich (R)	Martin O'Malley (D)
Rasmussen Reports	October 24, 2010	42%	52%
Rasmussen Reports	October 5, 2010	41%	49%
The Washington Post	September 22–26, 2010	41%	52%
Rasmussen Reports	September 15, 2010	47%	50%
Center Maryland/Opinion Works	August 13–18, 2010	41%	47%
Rasmussen Reports	August 17, 2010	44%	45%
Gonzales poll	July 13–21, 2010	42%	45%
Public Policy Polling	July 10–12, 2010	42%	45%
Rasmussen Reports	July 12, 2010	47%	46%
Magellan Strategies	June 29, 2010	46%	43%
The Polling Company	June 8–10, 2010	43%	44%
Rasmussen Reports	June 8, 2010	45%	45%
The Washington Post	May 3–6, 2010	41%	49%
Rasmussen Reports	April 20, 2010	44%	47%
Rasmussen Reports	February 23, 2010	43%	49%
Gonzales poll	September 17, 2009	38%	49%

=== Endorsements ===
Ehrlich was endorsed by high-profile people. These included Terrapin basketball standout and Memphis Grizzlies NBA draft pick Greivis Vásquez; and his former lieutenant governor, who was then the chairman of the Republican National Committee, Michael Steele. He was also supported by former Massachusetts governor Mitt Romney and former New York city mayor Rudy Giuliani. The support of these individuals elevated support to his campaign.

=== Results ===
On election night, Ehrlich won a majority of Maryland counties, but O'Malley's strong showing in the highly populated counties allowed him to win in a landslide over Ehrlich. He significantly increased his margin from 2006. In a year when Republicans made significant gains over Democrats, O'Malley received 56.2% of the vote while Ehrlich received 41.8%. The only county to flip from one party to another was Baltimore County, which Ehrlich had carried in 2006, but O'Malley carried by a narrow margin in 2010. O'Malley was certified as the winner, and was sworn in for his second term in January 2011.

2010 Maryland gubernatorial election
Party	Candidate	Votes	%	±%
Democratic	Martin O'Malley (incumbent)	1,044,961	56.24%	+3.54%
Republican	Bob Ehrlich	776,319	41.79%	−4.41%
Libertarian	Susan Gaztanaga	14,137	0.76%	
Green	Maria Allwine	11,825	0.64%	−0.26%
Constitution	Eric Knowles	8,612	0.46%	
Write-ins		2,026	0.11%	
Majority		268,642	14.45%	+7.92%
Turnout		1,857,880		
Democratic hold		Swing		

==== By county ====
County	Martin O'Malley Democratic		Bob Ehrlich Republican		Others	
County	#	%	#	%	#	%
Allegany	7,933	35.9%	13,394	60.5%	797	3.6%
Anne Arundel	88,161	43.4%	110,002	54.2%	4,797	2.4%
Baltimore	141,802	49.2%	140,476	48.7%	5,976	2.0%
Baltimore City	133,068	81.9%	26,073	16.1%	3,279	2.0%
Calvert	13,864	43.3%	17,444	54.5%	682	2.1%
Caroline	3,185	31.7%	6,571	65.4%	290	2.9%
Carroll	16,733	26.2%	45,357	71.1%	1,743	2.7%
Cecil	10,833	35.9%	18,273	60.6%	1,054	3.4%
Charles	28,818	61.3%	17,531	37.3%	660	1.3%
Dorchester	4,756	40.3%	6,780	57.5%	257	2.2%
Frederick	32,222	42.6%	41,410	54.7%	2,021	2.6%
Garrett	2,530	26.0%	6,972	71.6%	232	2.4%
Harford	31,220	33.0%	61,068	64.5%	2,346	2.6%
Howard	58,215	54.0%	47,642	44.2%	1,947	1.8%
Kent	3,574	43.4%	4,485	54.4%	185	2.2%
Montgomery	198,950	68.1%	89,108	30.5%	4,000	1.3%
Prince George's	203,957	87.9%	26,156	11.3%	1,841	0.8%
Queen Anne's	6,278	31.6%	13,238	66.6%	372	1.9%
Somerset	3,198	41.5%	4,318	56.0%	189	2.4%
St. Mary's	12,990	41.0%	17,804	56.2%	874	2.8%
Talbot	6,331	38.7%	9,707	59.3%	319	2.0%
Washington	15,155	37.5%	23,651	58.6%	1,578	3.9%
Wicomico	12,661	42.6%	16,325	54.9%	734	2.5%
Worcester	8,527	39.7%	12,534	58.3%	427	1.9%
Totals	1,044,961	56.3%	776,319	41.8%	35,072	1.9%

County that flipped from Republican to Democratic

- Baltimore County (largest municipality: Dundalk)

== Ehrlich campaign robocall controversy ==
In the summer before the election, Ehrlich's campaign hired a consultant who advised that "the first and most desired outcome is voter suppression", in the form of having "African-American voters stay home." To that end, the Republicans placed thousands of Election Day robocalls to Democratic voters, telling them that O'Malley had won, although in fact the polls were still open for some two more hours. The Republicans' call, worded to seem as if it came from Democrats, told the voters, "Relax. Everything's fine. The only thing left is to watch it on TV tonight." The calls reached 112,000 voters in majority-African American areas. In 2011, Ehrlich's campaign manager, Paul Schurick, was convicted of fraud and other charges because of the calls. Ehrlich denied knowing about the calls.

== See also ==
- 2010 Maryland Senate election
- 2010 Maryland House of Delegates election
