= Kristen Cox =

University fellow, instructor, keynote speaker, author, trainer, and consultant

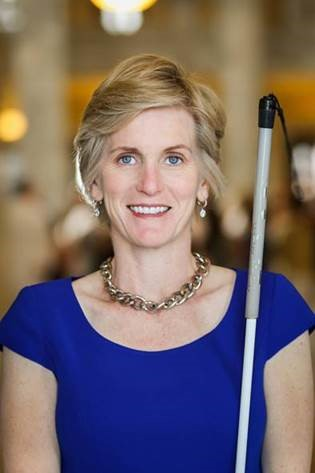
- Born: Bellevue, Washington
- Political party: Republican
- Spouse: Randy Cox

Kristen Cox (née Eyring) is an American business executive, university fellow and instructor, keynote speaker, published author, trainer, consultant, and co-founder of The Fulcrum. Cox is a fellow and instructor at the David Eccles School of Business at the University of Utah.

== Early life ==
Cox was born in Bellevue, Washington. While growing up in Utah, Cox gradually lost most of her vision starting about age 11 due to a genetic eye disorder.

Cox earned her Bachelor of Science in Educational Psychology from Brigham Young University

She served a mission for the Church of Jesus Christ of Latter-Day Saints in Brazil.

She received an honorary Ph.D. from Snow College in 2019.

== Career ==
Cox worked as Secretary of the Maryland Department of Disabilities. She was appointed to a position with the Department of Education by President George W. Bush and held numerous positions with the National Federation of the Blind. She ran as the Republican candidate for lieutenant governor of Maryland during the 2006 general election.

Cox served as the executive director of the Department of Workforce Services (DWS).

She was appointed executive director of the Utah Governor's Office of Management and Budget (GOMB) by Governor Gary Herbert in 2012. She served from 2012 to 2020.

== Recognition ==
- Governing Magazine's Public Officials of the Year
- Utah Community Foundation as an Enlightened 50 (2016)
- Utah Business Magazine as one of the 30 Women to Watch (2012)
- Days of 47's Pioneers of Progress Award for Business and Enterprise (2012)
