= Mary Kane =

American politician

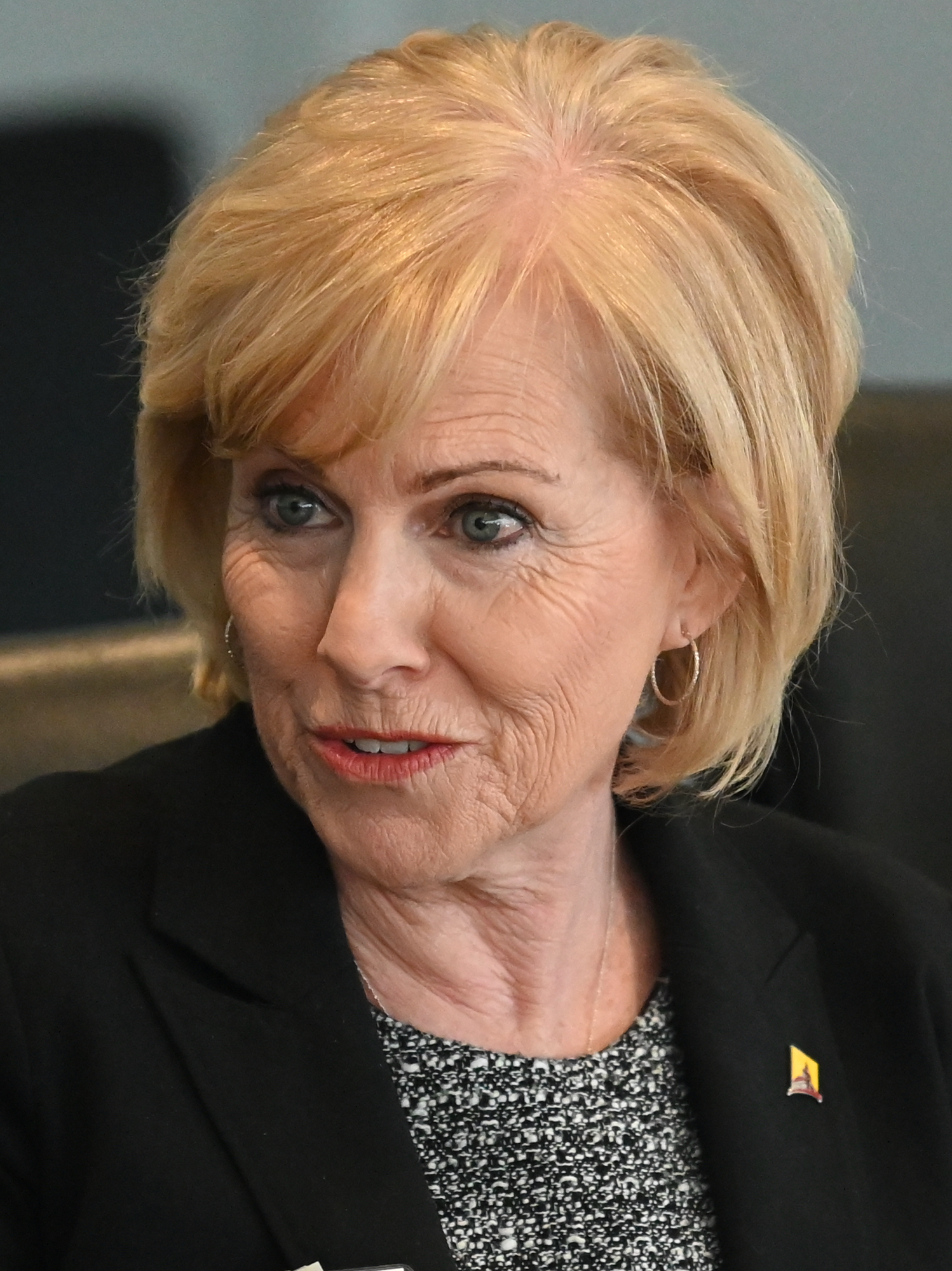
- Kane in 2023

Secretary of State of Maryland
- In office 2005–2007
- Governor: Bob Ehrlich
- Preceded by: R. Karl Aumann
- Succeeded by: Dennis C. Schnepfe

Personal details
- Born: March 10, 1962 (age 64)
- Party: Republican

Mary D. Kane (born March 10, 1962) is an American attorney from Maryland who was the Republican candidate for lieutenant governor in 2010, as the running mate of Bob Ehrlich. In October 2011, Kane became the president and CEO of Sister Cities International. Sister Cities International is a nonprofit organization for individual sister cities, counties, and states across the United States. Kane also sits on the board of Suburban Hospital, a member of Johns Hopkins Medicine and Mount St. Mary's University.

== Education ==
She graduated from Mount St. Mary's University in Emmitsburg, Maryland, with a BS in Business and Finance in 1984. After staying at home for 9 years to raise her three children, she went back to school and received her J.D. from the Catholic University of America's Columbus School of Law in Washington, D.C. in 1999.

In 2016, she became the first woman to chair the board of trustees for her alma mater, Mount St. Mary's University.

== Political career ==
Kane ran unsuccessfully as Republican candidate for the Maryland House of Delegates in District 15 in 2002. She also ran unsuccessfully for the Montgomery County Council in 2000.

She served as Secretary of State of Maryland from August 2, 2005, to January 17, 2007. Kane was the fourth woman, and first Republican woman, to hold the secretary of state office in Maryland. During her tenure she also served as the chair of the Governor's Subcabinet for International Affairs and as a member of the Governor's Executive Council, the Governor's Interagency Council for the Nonprofit Sector, the Governor's Commission on Maryland Military Monuments, and the Board of State Canvassers.

As secretary of state, Kane was instrumental in the passage of the legislation establishing the Maryland "Safe at Home" program for victims of domestic violence in 2006.

Before that, she was deputy secretary of state and chief legal counsel (2003–2005).

== Business career ==
Kane was admitted to Maryland Bar in 2001. She was of counsel with the law firm of Ethridge, Quinn, McAuliffe, Rowan & Hartinger in 2001–02.

After her term as secretary of state, Kane served as an assistant state's attorney in Montgomery County, Maryland, from 2007 to 2008.

From 2008 to 2011, Kane worked at the United States Chamber of Commerce as an executive director. In 2010, she took a leave of absence from the US Chamber to run for lieutenant governor.

In 2016, American City Business Journals named Kane one of the Top 25 Women Who Mean Business in Washington, D.C.

From 1997 to 2003, Kane was on the board of directors of Kane Co., an office moving company that held contracts with various federal agencies. On July 1, 2010, John Kane notified the Maryland Attorney General that Kane Co. would not bid on any Maryland contracts if his wife were elected lieutenant governor.

== Family ==
Mary currently resides in Washington, D.C., with her husband, John (who is the former chair of the Maryland Republican Party), and their three children Jack, Grace, and Elizabeth. Mary is the daughter of Irish immigrants.

Political offices
Preceded by R. Karl Aumann	Secretary of State of Maryland; 2005–2007	Succeeded by Dennis C. Schnepfe
