= Maryland StateStat =

Maryland StateStat is a performance-measurement and management tool used by the Government of Maryland. It was implemented by Governor Martin O'Malley in 2007.

== Origins ==
StateStat is modeled after CitiStat, Baltimore City's management program employed by O'Malley during his term as mayor of Baltimore, Maryland. CitiStat, in turn, was inspired by the success of New York City Police Department's CompStat accountability/performance management mechanism. All of these programs are based on the philosophy that careful analysis of data should dictate policies and support reform. Maryland has received national recognition as a leader in performance measurement because of its success with leveraging StateStat's data analysis to make sound budgetary decisions.

In 2009, Computerworld called Maryland the leader of the pack for its StateStat website.

== Operations ==
The participating state agencies submit data on key performance indicators to StateStat. This data is analyzed and used to identify areas of concern which are reported in an executive briefing. Leaders of each agency and the Governor's executive staff hold weekly meetings to discuss the agency's progress on selected initiatives and to develop strategies for improvement. StateStat has worked to increase transparency in government at the management level, an effort which has led to recognition from President Barack Obama.

Agency reports and summaries from every meeting can be found on the StateStat website. One tool that Maryland has pioneered is Geographic Information Systems (GIS) mapping. StateStat provides maps depicting the distribution of the capital budget and American Recovery and Reinvestment Act dollars across Maryland, along with information about the projects that the money finances. StateStat has partnered with other state agencies to launch the MD iMap, an interactive tool that lives up to O'Malley's vision of "One Maryland, One Map." This map compiles information from agencies across the state to provide information about many improvement projects clearly and accurately.

== See also ==
- Maryland BayStat
