= 2006 Maryland gubernatorial election =

- November 7, 2006
- Turnout: 57.53% ▼4.32%
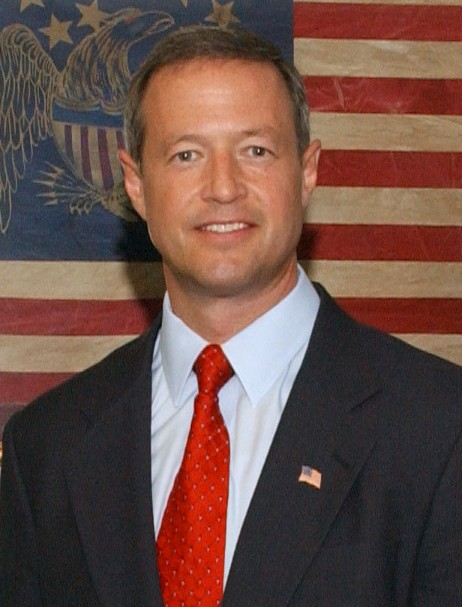

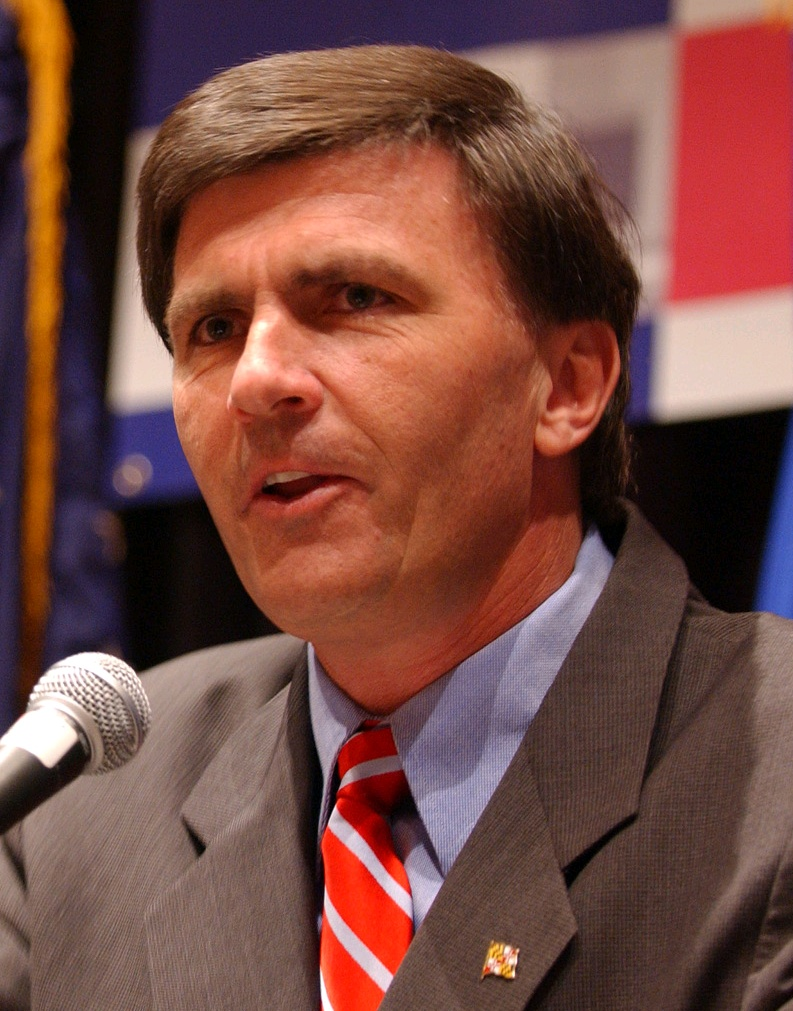
Nominee	Martin O'Malley	Bob Ehrlich
Party	Democratic	Republican
Running mate	Anthony Brown	Kristen Cox
Popular vote	942,279	825,464
Percentage	52.69%	46.16%
- O'Malley: 40–50% 50–60% 60–70% 70–80% 80–90% >90% Ehrlich: 40–50% 50–60% 60–70% 70–80% 80–90% >90% Tie: 40–50% 50%
Governor before election
Bob Ehrlich
Republican
Elected Governor
Martin O'Malley
Democratic

The 2006 Maryland gubernatorial election was held on November 7, 2006. Incumbent Republican governor Bob Ehrlich ran for a second term, but was defeated by the Democratic nominee, Baltimore Mayor Martin O'Malley. Ehrlich was the only incumbent governor to lose a general election in the 2006 midterms.

== Democratic primary ==
=== Candidates ===
- Martin O'Malley, Mayor of Baltimore

=== Campaign ===
Baltimore Mayor Martin O'Malley and Montgomery County Executive Doug Duncan emerged as the two Democratic candidates for governor in late 2005. Early polling indicated that O'Malley would have the advantage in both the Democratic primary and the general election, with a solid lead over Duncan in the primary and a several point lead over Ehrlich in the general.

As the gubernatorial campaign intensified, Duncan withdrew from the race, citing his diagnosis with clinical depression. In the same announcement, he threw his support behind O'Malley and declined to seek another office in the fall. No other Democratic candidate had announced, so O'Malley was unopposed in the primary election.

O'Malley selected Anthony Brown, a black State Delegate from Prince George's County and a veteran of the Iraq War, as his running mate.

=== Results ===
Democratic primary results
Party	Candidate	Votes	%
Democratic	Martin O'Malley	524,671	100.00%
Total votes		524,671	100.00%

== Republican primary ==
=== Candidates ===
- Bob Ehrlich, incumbent governor

=== Campaign ===
Ehrlich sought a second term as governor and did not face opposition at any point in the Republican primary. Incumbent lieutenant governor Michael Steele ran for the U.S. Senate instead of seeking a second term as lieutenant governor, so Ehrlich named Maryland Secretary of Disabilities Kristen Cox, who is blind, as his running mate.

=== Results ===
Republican primary results
Party	Candidate	Votes	%
Republican	Bob Ehrlich (incumbent)	213,744	100.00%
Total votes		213,744	100.00%

== General election ==
=== Candidates ===
- Martin O'Malley, Mayor of Baltimore (D)
- Bob Ehrlich, incumbent governor of Maryland (R)
- Ed Boyd, temporary employment agency recruiter (G)
- Christopher A. Driscoll (P)

=== Campaign ===
Elected to his first term in 2002, incumbent Republican governor Bob Ehrlich ran for a second term as governor, opposed by the Democratic nominee, Martin O'Malley, the mayor of Baltimore. Both candidates emerged from uncontested primary elections and a contentious election season began.

Early in the campaign, Ehrlich boasted decent approval ratings from Maryland citizens, with a Gonzalez Research poll taken during October 2005 showing him with a 49% approval rating. and The Baltimore Sun poll from November 2005 giving the Governor a 50% approval and a 33% disapproval. However, the unpopularity of the national Republican Party and President George W. Bush dragged Ehrlich's re-election chances down.

Ehrlich launched attack ads that hit O'Malley on crime in Baltimore under his tenure as Mayor, calling the murder rate in Baltimore "awful" and "an embarrassment to the state of Maryland." O'Malley countered with one television ad that featured testimonials from local community leaders, Howard County Executive James N. Robey, Baltimore County Executive James T. Smith Jr. and another ad that attacked Ehrlich for breaking his promise to end parole for violent criminals.

The Washington Post and The Washington Times both endorsed Ehrlich in his bid for re-election, with the Times praising Ehrlich's "brand of moderate conservatism that offers a refreshing contrast" to the state's historically Democratic leanings and the Post called him "a generally proficient, pragmatic governor" and praised him for "successes on transportation, the environment and education."

In turn, The Baltimore Sun endorsed O'Malley, saying, "the progress under the mayor's tenure is clear and irrefutable", and that he addressed "rising crime, failing schools and shrinking economic prospects." O'Malley also called upon the praise given to him by TIME Magazine when they named him one of the country's "Top 5 Big City Mayors."

=== Predictions ===
Source	Ranking	As of
The Cook Political Report	Tossup	November 6, 2006
Sabato's Crystal Ball	Lean D (flip)	November 6, 2006
Rothenberg Political Report	Lean D (flip)	November 2, 2006
Real Clear Politics	Tossup	November 6, 2006

=== Polling ===
Source	Date	Martin O'Malley (D)	Bob Ehrlich (R)
SurveyUSA	November 5, 2006	50%	47%
The Baltimore Sun/Potomac Inc.	November 1, 2006	47%	46%
The Wall Street Journal/Zogby	October 31, 2006	49.3%	43.9%
Public Opinion Strategies	October 31, 2006	46%	45%
Rasmussen	October 30, 2006	50%	47%
The Washington Post	October 29, 2006	55%	45%
Rasmussen	October 17, 2006	53%	45%
USA Today/Gallup	October 6, 2006	53%	41%
The Baltimore Sun/Potomac Inc.	September 24, 2006	50%	44%
Survey USA	September 20, 2006	51%	44%
Rasmussen	September 20, 2006	49%	42%
The Wall Street Journal/Zogby	September 11, 2006	52.5%	39.6%
The Wall Street Journal/Zogby	August 28, 2006	52.0%	42.2%
Rasmussen	August 18, 2006	50%	43%
	August 14, 2006	41%	41%
The Wall Street Journal/Zogby	July 24, 2006	51.3%	42.2%
Rasmussen	July 17, 2006	49%	42%
The Baltimore Sun/Potomac Inc.	July 16, 2006	46%	38%
The Washington Post	June 25, 2006	51%	40%
The Wall Street Journal/Zogby	June 21, 2006	53.1%	39.2%
Opinion Works	April 27, 2006	46%	37%
Rasmussen	April 21, 2006	51%	42%
Gonzales Research	April 18, 2006	46%	41%
Rasmussen	January 13, 2006	42%	47%
The Wall Street Journal/Zogby	January 13, 2006	53%	40%
Rasmussen	November 22, 2005	46%	40%
The Baltimore Sun	November 6, 2005	48%	33%
The Baltimore Sun	October 25, 2005	48%	42%
Rasmussen	July 18, 2005	41%	46%
The Baltimore Sun	April 17, 2005	45%	39%
The Baltimore Sun	January 2005	40%	40%

=== Results ===

Maryland gubernatorial election, 2006
Party	Candidate	Votes	%	±%
Democratic	Martin O'Malley	942,279	52.69%	+5.02%
Republican	Bob Ehrlich (incumbent)	825,464	46.16%	−5.39%
Green	Ed Boyd	15,551	0.87%	N/A
Populist	Christopher Driscoll	3,481	0.19%	N/A
Write-in		1,541	0.09%	N/A
Total votes		1,788,316	100.00%	N/A
Democratic gain from Republican				

==== Results by county ====
County	Martin O'Malley Democratic		Robert Ehrlich Republican		Various candidates Other parties		Margin		Total votes cast
County	#	%	#	%	#	%	#	%	Total votes cast
Allegany	9,033	41.5%	12,424	57.1%	299	1.3%	-3,391	-15.6%	21,756
Anne Arundel	78,909	42.0%	106,897	56.9%	2,117	1.1%	-27,988	-14.9%	187,923
Baltimore	135,567	47.9%	143,970	50.9%	3,391	1.2%	-8,403	-3.0%	282,928
Baltimore City	115,136	75.3%	34,554	22.6%	3,244	2.1%	80,582	52.7%	152,934
Calvert	12,519	41.7%	17,163	57.2%	319	1.1%	-4,644	-15.5%	30,001
Caroline	2,947	32.5%	5,994	66.1%	133	1.5%	-3,047	-33.6%	9,074
Carroll	18,227	29.0%	43,921	69.9%	653	1.1%	-25,694	-40.9%	62,801
Cecil	11,750	41.0%	16,559	57.7%	366	1.4%	-4,809	-16.7%	28,675
Charles	21,237	51.3%	19,757	47.7%	411	1.0%	1,480	3.6%	41,405
Dorchester	4,126	38.3%	6,529	60.7%	104	0.9%	-2,403	-22.4%	10,759
Frederick	28,644	39.2%	43,536	59.6%	908	1.3%	-14,892	-20.4%	73,088
Garrett	3,108	31.5%	6,642	67.2%	127	1.3%	-3,534	-35.7%	9,877
Harford	32,490	35.6%	57,882	63.4%	965	1.1%	-25,392	-27.8%	91,337
Howard	52,651	49.8%	51,974	49.1%	1,125	1.0%	677	0.7%	105,750
Kent	3,484	43.9%	4,369	55.0%	89	1.1%	-885	-11.1%	7,942
Montgomery	190,873	62.4%	112,071	36.7%	2,787	1.0%	78,802	25.7%	305,731
Prince George's	162,899	78.6%	42,514	20.5%	1,713	0.8%	120,385	58.1%	207,126
Queen Anne's	5,859	32.4%	12,054	66.7%	146	0.8%	-6,195	-34.3%	18,059
Somerset	2,691	39.8%	3,999	59.2%	65	1.0%	-1,308	-19.4%	6,755
St. Mary's	11,516	40.2%	16,683	58.3%	434	1.5%	-5,167	-18.1%	28,633
Talbot	5,669	35.8%	10,062	63.6%	102	0.6%	-4,393	-27.8%	15,833
Washington	15,722	37.9%	25,157	60.7%	578	1.4%	-9,435	-22.8%	41,457
Wicomico	10,214	36.2%	17,678	62.7%	317	1.1%	-7,464	-26.5%	28,209
Worcester	7,008	34.6%	13,075	64.5%	180	0.9%	-6,067	-29.9%	20,263
Totals	942,279	52.7%	825,464	46.2%	20,573	1.2%	116,815	6.5%	1,788,316

Counties that flipped from Republican to Democratic

- Charles (largest municipality: Waldorf)
- Howard (largest municipality: Columbia)
