= 2003–04 Baltimore mayoral election =

Baltimore mayoral election, 2003–2004
- November 2, 2004
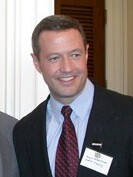

Candidate	Martin O'Malley	Elbert R. Henderson
Party	Democratic	Republican
Popular vote	173,030	24,445
Percentage	87.21%	12.32%
Mayor before election
Martin O'Malley
Democratic
Elected mayor
Martin O'Malley
Democratic

The 2003–2004 Baltimore mayoral election saw the reelection of incumbent mayor Martin O'Malley.

In 1999, Baltimore citizens voted to move mayoral elections to take place in presidential election years, effective with the 2004 elections. However, primary dates in Maryland can only be set by the General Assembly, which refused to move the primary to 2004. As a result, while the primary took place on September 9, 2003; the general election took place 14 months later, on November 2, 2004. Democratic incumbent Martin O'Malley was reelected, but only to a three-year term rather than the usual four-year term.

It would be 2012 before the General Assembly finally agreed to move municipal elections to coincide with presidential elections, effective in 2016.

Until Brandon Scott's reelection in 2024, this was the last time a mayor of Baltimore won re-election to a second full term.

== Nominations ==
=== Democratic primary ===
2003 Democratic primary results
Party	Candidate	Votes	%
Democratic	Martin O'Malley (incumbent)	59,569	66.61%
Democratic	Andrey Bundley	28,551	31.93%
Democratic	A. Robert Kaufman	667	0.75%
Democratic	Marvin Ray Jones	348	0.39%
Democratic	Charles U. Smith	288	0.32%
Total votes		89,423	

=== Republican primary ===
2003 Republican primary results
Party	Candidate	Votes	%
Republican	Elbert R. Henderson	2,504	100.00%
Total votes		2,504	

== General election ==
Baltimore City Mayoral General Election, 2004
Party	Candidate	Votes	%
Democratic	Martin O'Malley (incumbent)	173,030	87.21%
Republican	Elbert R. Henderson	24,445	12.32%
Democratic	Frank M. Conaway (write-in)	926	0.47%
Democratic	Charles U. Smith (write-in)	4	0.00%
Total votes		198,405	
Democratic hold			
