= Bob Ehrlich =

Governor of Maryland from 2003 to 2007

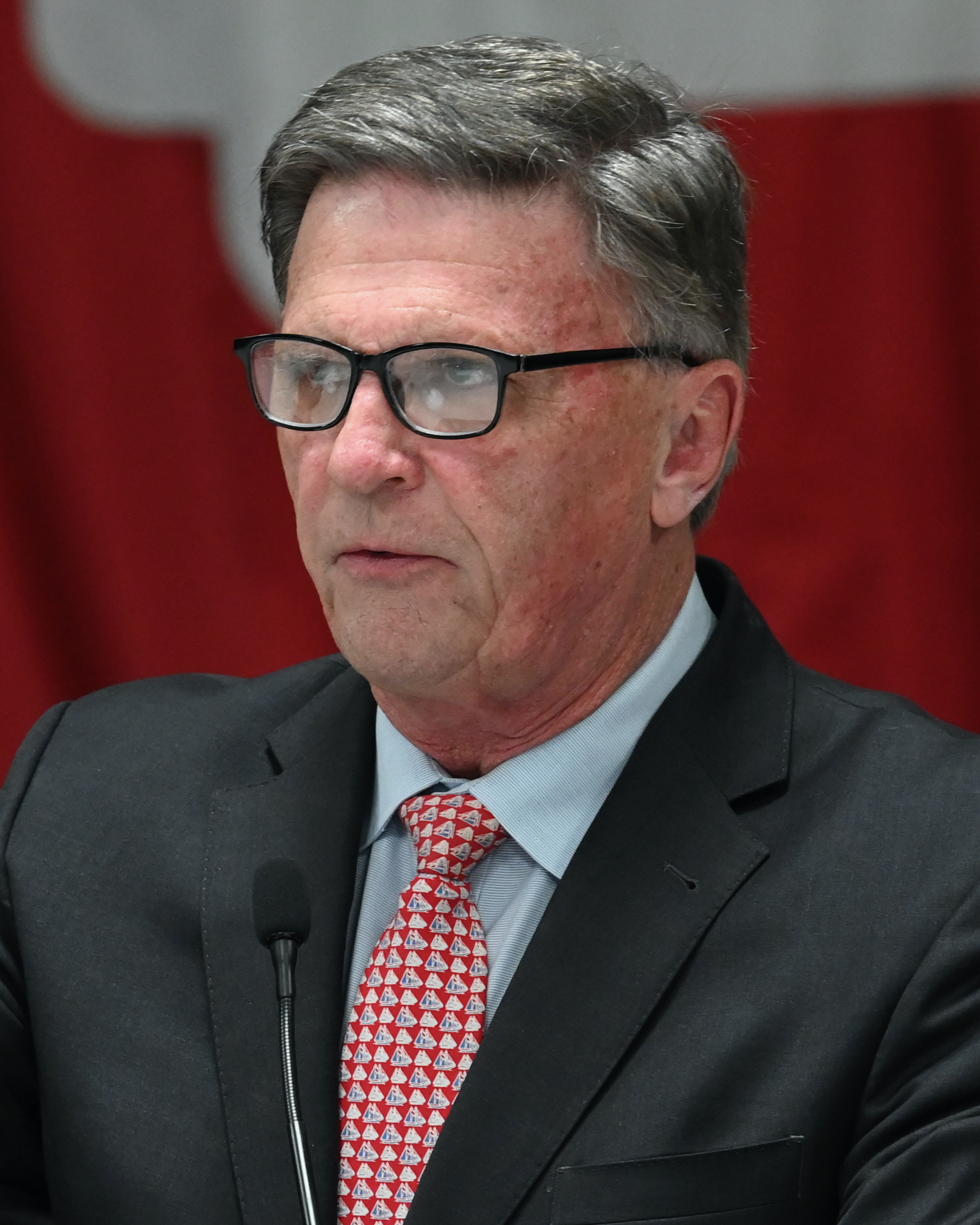
- Ehrlich in 2024

60th Governor of Maryland
- In office January 15, 2003 – January 17, 2007
- Lieutenant: Michael Steele
- Preceded by: Parris Glendening
- Succeeded by: Martin O'Malley

Member of the U.S. House of Representatives from Maryland's 2nd district
- In office January 3, 1995 – January 3, 2003
- Preceded by: Helen Bentley
- Succeeded by: Dutch Ruppersberger

Member of the Maryland House of Delegates from the 10th district
- In office January 14, 1987 – January 11, 1995 Serving with Wade Kach, Ellen Sauerbrey
- Preceded by: Thomas Chamberlain
- Succeeded by: Emmett C. Burns Jr. Shirley Nathan-Pulliam; Joan Neverdon Parker

Personal details
- Born: Robert Leroy Ehrlich Jr. November 25, 1957 (age 68) Arbutus, Maryland, U.S.
- Party: Republican
- Spouse: Kendel Sibiski (m. 1993)
- Children: 2
- Education: Princeton University (BA); Wake Forest University (JD)
- Website: Official website
- Ehrlich's voice Ehrlich on the retirement of Cal Ripken, Baltimore Orioles shortstop. Recorded October 2, 2001

Robert Leroy Ehrlich Jr. (born November 25, 1957) is an American lawyer and politician who served as the 60th governor of Maryland from 2003 to 2007. A Republican, Ehrlich represented Maryland's 10th legislative district in the House of Delegates from 1987 to 1995 and Maryland's 2nd congressional district in the U.S. House of Representatives from 1995 to 2003.

Ehrlich was the first Republican to serve as governor of Maryland since Spiro Agnew left office in 1969. He served one term before being defeated in his 2006 re-election bid by Democrat Martin O'Malley. In 2010, Ehrlich sought an unsuccessful rematch against O'Malley. Ehrlich then announced, via his website, that he would "return to private life." In October 2011, he was named chair of Mitt Romney's Maryland campaign for the 2012 Republican nomination for President.

== Early life, career, and family ==
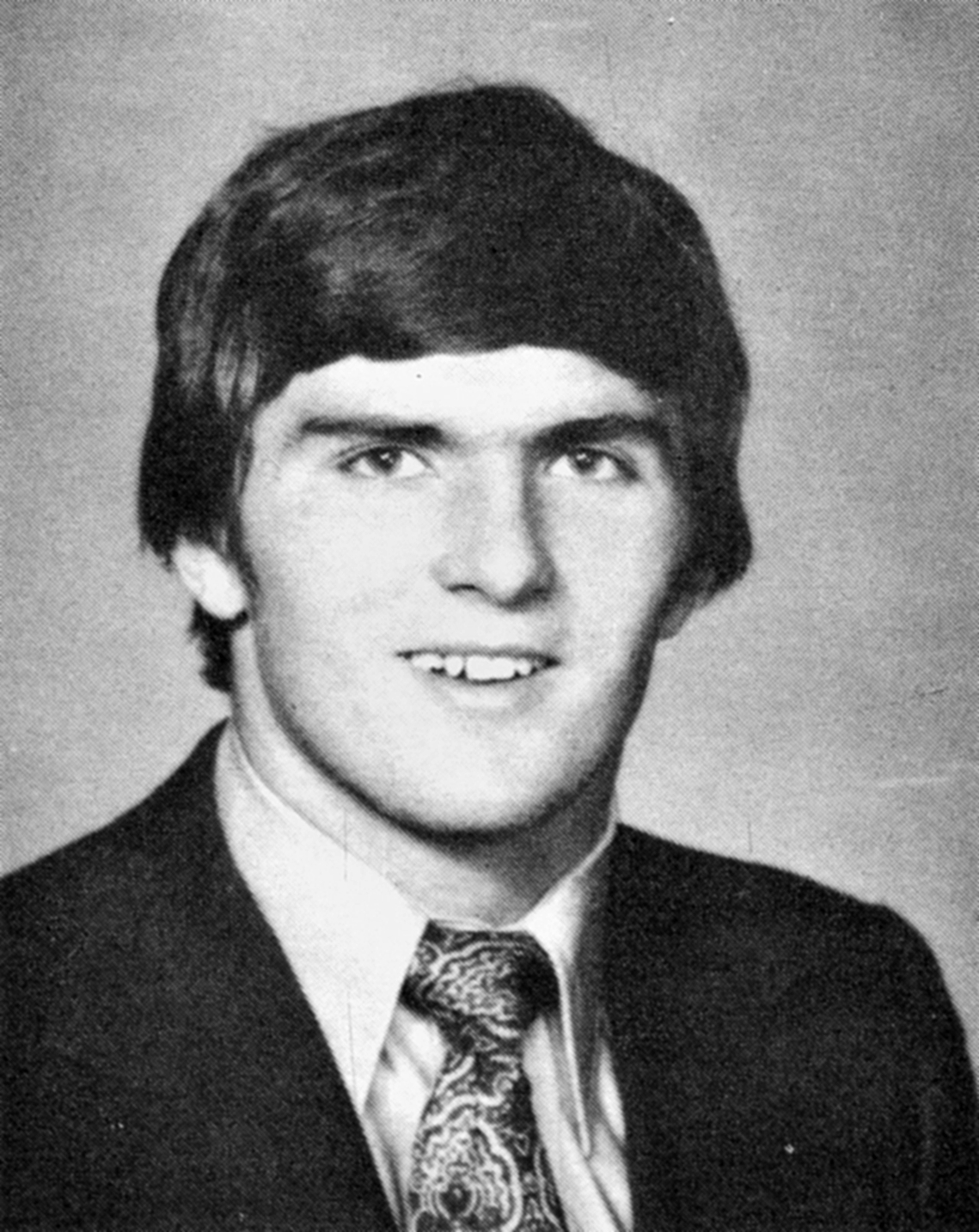
Ehrlich in the Princeton University yearbook, 1979

Of German descent, Ehrlich was born in the Southwest Baltimore suburb of Arbutus, Maryland, the son of Nancy (Bottorf), a legal secretary, and Robert Leroy Ehrlich, a commission car salesman. After attending Gilman School, he studied at Princeton University, where he attended on a partial scholarship and was captain of the football team and a member of the Cap and Gown Club. Ehrlich graduated from Princeton with an A.B. in politics in 1979 after completing a 140-page long senior thesis titled "Alexander Solzenitsyn: The Man and His Politics." He continued on to law school, graduating from Wake Forest University School of Law in 1982.

After law school, Ehrlich worked for Ober, Kaler, Grimes & Shriver, a Baltimore law firm, and became active in politics. In November 1986, Ehrlich won a seat in the Maryland House of Delegates, representing parts of Baltimore County from 1987 to 1995.

=== Personal ===
He married Kendel Sibiski in 1993. They have two sons, Drew Robert Ehrlich and Joshua Taylor Ehrlich.

As of 2013, he was a frequent guest on the Sports Junkies.

== U.S. House of Representatives (1995–2003) ==
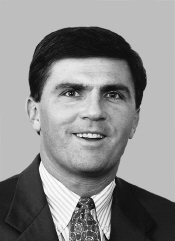
Ehrlich during his tenure in Congress

In 1993, 2nd district Representative Helen Delich Bentley announced she would be vacating her seat in the U.S. House of Representatives. Ehrlich announced his candidacy for the open seat and won the election in November 1994. During his term, he introduced legislation aimed at helping disabled people maintain employment and supported harsher gun violence penalties.

While in Congress, Ehrlich served on the U.S. House Energy and Commerce Committee. He was also a member of the subcommittees on health, telecommunications and the Internet, and environment and hazardous materials; the Congressional Biotechnology Caucus, where he served as co-chairman; and the Congressional Steel Caucus. In 1999, He voted to remove president Bill Clinton from office during Clinton's impeachment trial.

Ehrlich won all his elections in Congress by margins of at least 25%. He announced he would be forgoing reelection in 2002 to run for governor. He was succeeded by Dutch Ruppersberger, a Democrat.

== 2002 Maryland gubernatorial campaign ==
In 2002, Democratic Governor Parris Glendening's second term was ending. While Glendening had been reelected by a substantial margin in 1998, the final years of his term were plagued by a personal marital crisis, and a large state budget deficit. The rural areas of Maryland – largely Republican – had long criticized Glendening for what they perceived as zealous environmental regulations; in addition, they believed that he did not give sufficient attention to their needs for infrastructure improvements (bridges, highways, etc.).

On March 15, 2002, Ehrlich announced his candidacy for the governorship. He attacked Glendening's record, tying his Democratic opponent, Lt. Gov. Kathleen Kennedy Townsend, to him. Ehrlich promised, if elected, to increase school funding, balance the budget, and protect the Chesapeake Bay. His running mate was Michael Steele, an African-American and the chair of the Maryland Republican Party.

During the election, Townsend was criticized for her choice of running mate; she picked retired Admiral Charles R. Larson, a novice politician who had switched parties only a few weeks before. The Townsend campaign was also hurt by the unpopularity of Glendening, who had implemented a redistricting proposal that was overturned by Maryland's highest court. Townsend's popularity continued to fall when it was reported that much of her campaign money was given by out-of-state donors; Ehrlich remained on the attack while the lieutenant governor's poll numbers declined.

Though Maryland traditionally votes Democratic and had not elected a Republican governor in almost 40 years, Ehrlich won the race (52% of the vote to Townsend's 48%). He was the sixth Republican governor in state history and the first since Spiro Agnew left office to take the Vice Presidency in 1969.

== Governor of Maryland (2003–2007) ==
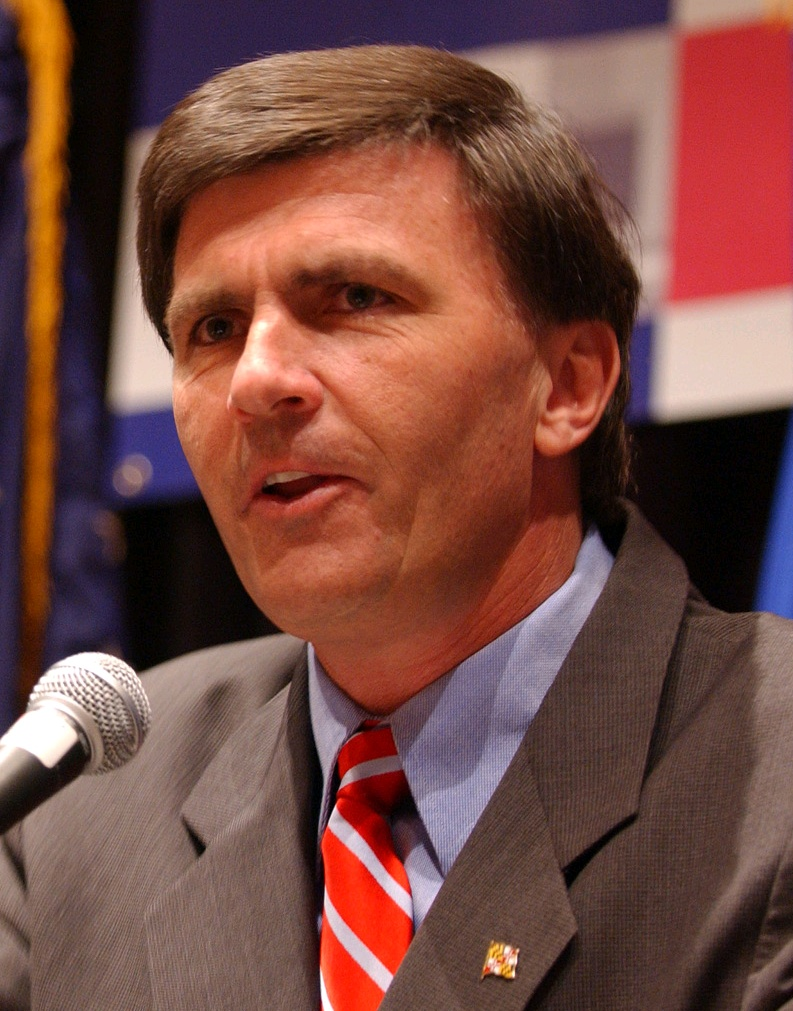
At a Steps to a HealthierUS summit, c. 2004

Ehrlich said "fiscal responsibility, education, health, and the environment, public safety, and commerce" were the "Five Pillars" of his administration. He opposed sales and income tax increases and supported legalization of slot machines to raise revenue.

Under Ehrlich's tenure, Maryland stayed 0.5% or more below the national unemployment average. The unemployment rate dropped significantly from 4.5% in 2003 to 3.9% in 2006, with an increase of 98,000 private sector jobs, aided by its proximity to the strong labor market associated with the national capital.

Ehrlich established a Department of Disabilities within his cabinet for people with disabilities – the first such cabinet-level agency in the nation.

In 2004, Ehrlich signed the Chesapeake Bay Restoration Act: it funds upgrades of water treatment plants to reduce pollution discharge by a surcharge on business and residential water and septic bills. The resulting reduction in pollution into the bay was expected to meet approximately one-third of Maryland's obligations under the 2000 Chesapeake Bay Agreement. The Chesapeake Bay Foundation described the Chesapeake Bay Restoration Act as the most significant piece of legislation for the Bay in a generation.

Ehrlich opposed President George W. Bush's 2006 approval for a United Arab Emirates firm to take control of six U.S. port operations, including those at the Port of Baltimore. (See Dubai Ports World controversy).

In 2006, Ehrlich signed a law banning police traffic ticket quotas.

=== Veto of the "Wal-Mart" Health Care Bill ===
In January 2006, Ehrlich vetoed the "Fair Share Health Care Bill," also known as the Walmart Bill, which required businesses with more than 10,000 employees in the state (three of the four companies being Walmart, Northrop Grumman, and Giant) to either spend eight percent of payroll on employee health care, or pay that amount to a state health program for the uninsured. The bill was commonly nicknamed after Walmart because it was the only company in Maryland of that size that did not already spend the requisite eight percent. Ehrlich, after consulting with counsel regarding the legal validity of the bill, vetoed the proposed legislation as it would run afoul of federal law. Despite this, and over the pleas of state representatives whose constituents benefited from Walmart's employment and feared a diminished presence in the state, the Democratic legislators of the Maryland Legislature passed the bill over Ehrlich's veto, in part leading to cancellation of the building of a Walmart distribution center in one of Maryland's poorest counties.

Critics of the international discount chain claimed that Wal-Mart's low wages force employees and their dependents to rely on state healthcare assistance. (See Wal-Mart Employee and Labor Relations). The bill's supporters claimed that the veto showed Ehrlich, whose official biography describes him as "unapologetically pro-business," had sided with "big corporate interests rather than Maryland's working families." For his part, Ehrlich called the bill the "first step toward government-run health care" by "anti-jobs lawmakers." He claimed that it would hurt low and middle-income consumers and was unfair to Wal-Mart and other businesses. On July 7, 2006, the Maryland law was overturned in federal court by U.S. District Judge Frederick Motz, who ruled that the law violated the Employee Retirement Income Security Act (ERISA) of 1974, while also noting that it would "hurt Wal-Mart by imposing the administrative burden of tracking benefits in Maryland differently than in other states."

=== 2006 gubernatorial election ===
Governor Ehrlich opted to seek a second term and did not face opposition in the Republican primary. On November 7, 2006, Ehrlich was defeated for re-election in the 2006 gubernatorial election by Baltimore Mayor Martin O'Malley, who won 53% to Ehrlich's 46%. Ehrlich's term as governor expired at noon on January 17, 2007.

=== Between elections ===
A month after he left public office, Ehrlich and several aides from his administration opened a Baltimore-area office of North Carolina law firm Womble Carlyle Sandridge & Rice. His wife Kendel took a consulting job as a director of the BankAnnapolis.

In March 2007, Ehrlich endorsed former New York Mayor Rudy Giuliani for the US presidency. He was the Chairman of Giuliani's Mid-Atlantic Campaign Committee.

In April 2007, Ehrlich became a member of the Sons of the American Revolution (SAR) through his documented descent from Zachariah Dowden Sr., who served as a Private in the Montgomery County, Maryland militia during the American Revolution.

Ehrlich and his wife hosted their own radio show on WBAL-AM Radio every Saturday from 2007 to 2010. Governor Ehrlich has guest lectured at Towson University in Professor Richard Vatz's political persuasion class twice a year since 1993.

== 2010 gubernatorial campaign ==
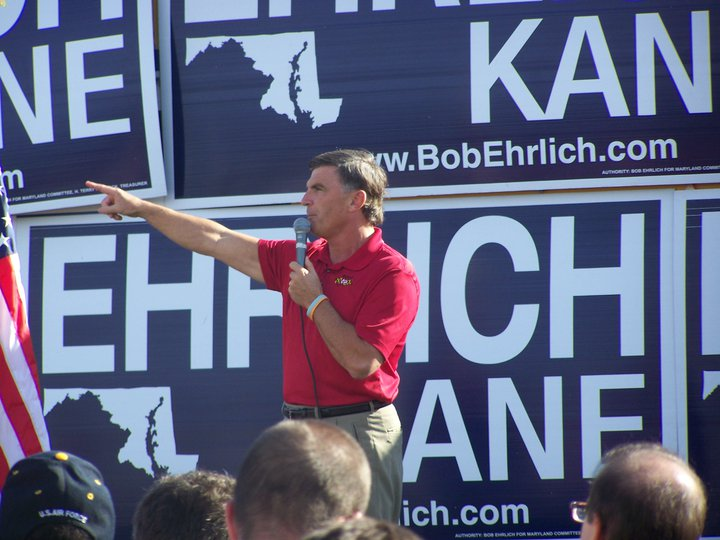
Ehrlich campaigning for governor in 2010

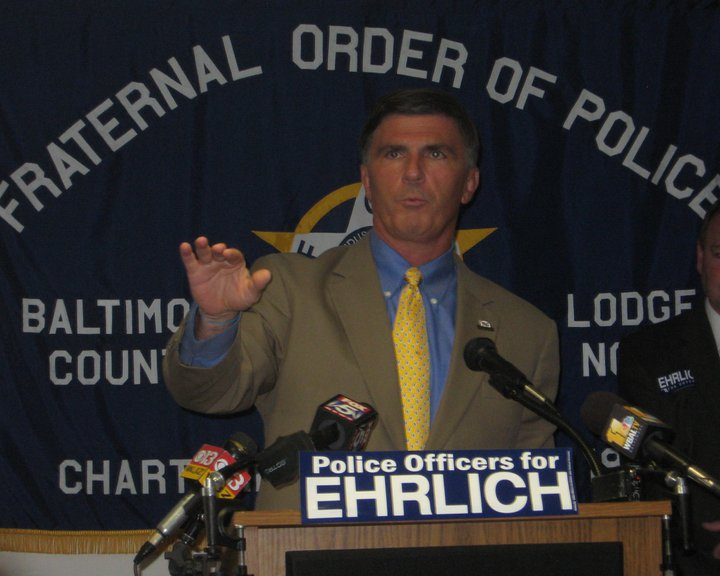
Ehrlich receiving the endorsement of the Fraternal Order of Police

On March 30, Ehrlich announced that he would challenge incumbent Governor Martin O'Malley.

In June 2010, Ehrlich was endorsed by Terrapin basketball standout and Memphis Grizzlies NBA draft pick Greivis Vásquez. On June 30, 2010, Ehrlich announced that his running mate would be Mary Kane, who had served under Governor Ehrlich as secretary of state, August 2, 2005, to January 17, 2007, and also as deputy secretary of state and chief legal counsel, March 2003 to August 2, 2005. He easily won the Republican primary.

His former lieutenant governor, then Chairman of the Republican National Committee Michael Steele, traveled to Maryland on his "Fire Pelosi" bus tour to endorse Ehrlich. Former Massachusetts Governor Mitt Romney also appeared at a fundraiser to endorse Ehrlich. Former New York City Mayor Rudy Giuliani campaigned in Maryland with Ehrlich, calling him "one of the best governors of all-time."

In the general election, Ehrlich lost again to O'Malley 56% to 42%.

In December 2011, Ehrlich's 2010 campaign manager, Paul E. Schurick, was convicted of four counts of fraud and conspiracy concerning a scheme to suppress the black vote using 112,000 fraudulent robocalls, which discouraged voters from going to the polls. Political consultant Julius Hensen was also convicted on one count.

== Support for presidential candidates ==
In March 2007, Ehrlich endorsed Rudy Giuliani in the 2008 election and was the Chairman of Giuliani's Mid-Atlantic Campaign Committee. In October 2011, Ehrlich was named chairman of Mitt Romney's Maryland campaign for election as president in 2012.

After initially supporting John Kasich as a Republican candidate in the 2016 presidential primaries, Ehrlich endorsed nominee Donald Trump in May 2016.

== After politics ==
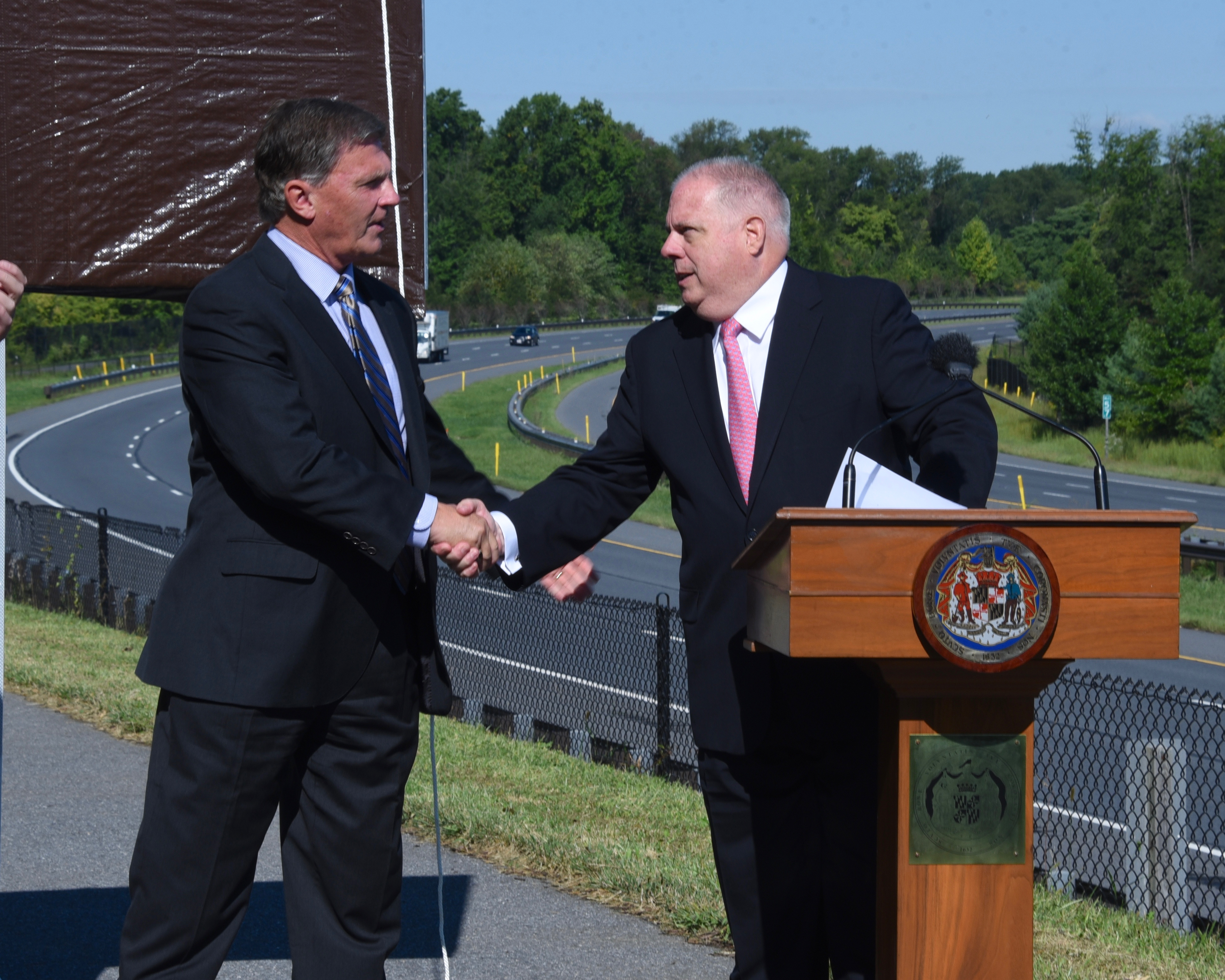
Ehrlich with Larry Hogan in 2017

As of December 2020, Ehrlich was working as senior counsel in the Washington office of King & Spalding, a major corporate law firm, on the governmental advocacy and public policy (lobbying) team.

In August 2022, the Maryland Republican Party announced that Ehrlich would lead its "2022 Victory Campaign" to support the party's nominees in that year's elections, including Dan Cox and Michael Peroutka. He spent most of his tenure fundraising for the Maryland Republican Party as a whole. Cox and Peroutka were defeated in a landslide by Democratic nominees Wes Moore and Anthony Brown in the general election on November 8, 2022. Ehrlich again supported Cox as the Republican nominee in the 2026 Maryland gubernatorial election, joining his campaign as a finance advisor in July 2026.

== Election history ==
Year	Office	Subject	Party	Votes	Pct	Opponent	Party	Votes	Pct	Opponent	Party	Votes	Pct
1994	Congress, District 2	Robert Ehrlich	Republican	125,162	63%	Gerry Brewster	Democratic	74,275	37%				
1996	Congress, District 2	Robert Ehrlich	Republican	143,075	62%	Connie Dejuliis	Democratic	88,344	38%				
1998	Congress, District 2	Robert Ehrlich	Republican	145,711	69%	Kenneth Bosley	Democratic	64,474	31%				
2000	Congress, District 2	Robert Ehrlich	Republican	178,556	69%	Kenneth Bosley	Democratic	81,591	31%				
2002	Governor	Robert Ehrlich	Republican	879,592	52%	Kathleen Kennedy Townsend	Democratic	813,422	48%	Spear Lancaster	Libertarian	11,546	<1%
2006	Governor	Robert Ehrlich	Republican	825,464	46%	Martin O'Malley	Democratic	942,279	53%	Ed Boyd	Green	15,551	1%
2010	Governor	Robert Ehrlich	Republican	776,319	42%	Martin O'Malley	Democratic	1,044,961	56%				

== See also ==
- Government of Maryland

== Footnotes ==
U.S. House of Representatives
Preceded by Helen Bentley	Member of the U.S. House of Representatives from Maryland's 2nd congressional district 1995–2003	Succeeded by Dutch Ruppersberger
Party political offices
Preceded by Ellen Sauerbrey	Republican nominee for Governor of Maryland; 2002, 2006, 2010	Succeeded by Larry Hogan
Political offices
Preceded by Parris Glendening	Governor of Maryland; 2003–2007	Succeeded by Martin O'Malley
U.S. order of precedence (ceremonial)
Preceded by Parris Glendening as Former Governor	Order of precedence of the United States	Succeeded by Martin O'Malley as Former Governor
