= Martin O'Malley =

American politician (born 1963)

- Official portrait, 2023

17th Commissioner of the Social Security Administration
- In office December 20, 2023 – November 29, 2024
- President: Joe Biden
- Preceded by: Kilolo Kijakazi (acting)
- Succeeded by: Carolyn Colvin (acting)

61st Governor of Maryland
- In office January 17, 2007 – January 21, 2015
- Lieutenant: Anthony Brown
- Preceded by: Bob Ehrlich
- Succeeded by: Larry Hogan

48th Mayor of Baltimore
- In office December 7, 1999 – January 17, 2007
- Preceded by: Kurt Schmoke
- Succeeded by: Sheila Dixon

Member of the Baltimore City Council from the 3rd district
- In office 1991–1999
- Preceded by: Multi-member district
- Succeeded by: Multi-member district

Personal details
- Born: Martin Joseph O'Malley; January 18, 1963 (age 63) Washington, D.C., U.S.
- Party: Democratic
- Spouse: Katie Curran (m. 1990)
- Children: 4
- Education: Catholic University (BA); University of Maryland, Baltimore (JD)
- Website: Official website
- Martin O'Malley's voice O'Malley on his tenure as Mayor of Baltimore. Recorded March 8, 2014

Martin Joseph O'Malley (born January 18, 1963) is an American politician who served as the 17th commissioner of the Social Security Administration from 2023 to 2024. A member of the Democratic Party, he was the 61st governor of Maryland from 2007 to 2015 and the 48th mayor of Baltimore from 1999 to 2007.

O'Malley was elected to the Baltimore City Council in 1991 and re-elected in 1995. He was elected mayor of Baltimore in 1999 after a surprise win in the Democratic primary. He won a second term as mayor in 2004. As mayor, O'Malley prioritized reducing crime within the city. O'Malley won the 2006 Maryland gubernatorial election, unseating incumbent Republican governor Bob Ehrlich. During his first term as governor, O'Malley implemented Maryland StateStat and became the first governor to sign the National Popular Vote Interstate Compact. O'Malley won reelection in 2010. In 2011, he signed a law that would make illegal immigrants brought to the United States as children eligible for in-state college tuition. In 2012, he signed a law to legalize same-sex marriage in Maryland. Both laws were approved in referendums in the 2012 general election. O'Malley served as the chair of the Democratic Governors Association from 2011 to 2013. After leaving office in 2015, O'Malley was appointed to The Johns Hopkins University's Carey Business School as a visiting professor focusing on government, business and urban issues.

Long rumored to have presidential ambitions, O'Malley publicly announced his candidacy for the 2016 Democratic presidential nomination on May 30, 2015. One of six major candidates, O'Malley struggled to gain support, and he suspended his campaign on February 1, 2016, after finishing third in the Iowa caucuses. He endorsed Hillary Clinton four months later. Following his presidential campaign, he lectured at Georgetown University and Boston College Law School and has written two books about the use of technology in government. In July 2023, President Joe Biden nominated O'Malley to lead the Social Security Administration. He was confirmed by the United States Senate with a 50–11 vote on December 18, 2023.

In November 2024, O'Malley announced that he would run for chair of the Democratic National Committee in 2025, seeking to succeed Jaime Harrison. He was defeated by Minnesota Democratic–Farmer–Labor Party chair Ken Martin, placing third with the votes of 44 delegates.

== Early life and education ==
Martin Joseph O'Malley was born on January 18, 1963, in Washington, D.C., the son of Barbara (née Suelzer) and Thomas Martin O'Malley. Martin's father served as a bombardier in the U.S. Army Air Force in the Pacific theater during the Second World War, and recalled witnessing the mushroom cloud rise over Hiroshima while on a routine mission. Thomas later became a Montgomery County–based criminal defense lawyer, and an assistant United States Attorney for the District of Columbia.

O'Malley attended the Our Lady of Lourdes School in Bethesda and Gonzaga College High School. He graduated from the Catholic University of America in 1985. Later that year, he enrolled in the University of Maryland School of Law, on the urban campus of the University of Maryland at Baltimore, earning his J.D. in 1988, and was admitted to the Maryland bar that same year.

== Early political career ==
In December 1982, while still in college, O'Malley joined the Gary Hart presidential campaign for the 1984 election. In late 1983, he volunteered to go to Iowa where he phone-banked, organized volunteers, played guitar and sang at small fundraisers and other events. In 1986, while in law school, O'Malley was named by then-Congresswoman Barbara Mikulski as state field director for her successful primary and general election campaigns for the U.S. Senate. He served as a legislative fellow in Mikulski's Senate office in 1987 and 1988. Later that year, he was hired as an assistant State's Attorney for the City of Baltimore, holding that position until 1990.

In 1990, at the encouragement of Maryland attorney general J. Joseph Curran Jr., O'Malley ran for the Maryland State Senate in the 43rd State Senate District in northeast Baltimore. He challenged one-term incumbent John A. Pica in the Democratic Party primary, and lost by just 44 votes. He was considered an underdog when he first filed to run, but "came out of nowhere" to lead Pica on election night. The loss was narrow enough that his loss could only be projected after absentee ballots were counted subsequent to the night of the election.

== Baltimore City Council (1991–1999) ==
In 1991, O'Malley was elected to the Baltimore City Council representing the 3rd Councilman District (when each of six districts had three members) and served from 1991 to 1999. His 1991 election was endorsed by the editorial board of The Baltimore Sun.

As councilman, O'Malley served as chairman of the Legislative Investigations Committee and chairman of the Taxation and Finance Committee. As a councilman, O'Malley advocated for many reforms. During the 1992 Democratic Party presidential primaries, he served as the Maryland coordinator for the presidential campaign of Nebraska U.S. Senator Bob Kerrey.

In 1996, O'Malley became a chief ally of City Council President Lawrence Bell at a time when Bell was engaged in a power-struggle with Mayor Kurt Schmoke. Fellow 3rd district councilor Joan Carter Conway joined O'Malley in aligning with Bell's positions on key votes. However, the other council member from the third district, Robert W. Curran, broke with them and instead voted for the mayor's preferred positions. O'Malley had previously been politically partnered with Curran, with the two having co-endorsed each other in the 1995 City Council election. Curran is also the uncle of O'Malley's wife. However, due to Curran's alignment with the mayor, in October 1996 O'Malley wrote an open letter assailing him.

By his second term, O'Malley was seen as a charismatic rising star in Baltimore politics, and was believed to be likely to soon seek a higher office. In a 1997 profile, Kevin Cowherd of The Baltimore Sun wrote of O'Malley,

To many, Martin O'Malley seems ideally suited to the role of reformer, almost as if he were born for the job. He is 34, tall, leading-man handsome, with a Chiclets smile that seems to make his face glow. Now in his second term as an elected official, he's articulate, passionate, charismatic in a Kennedyesque way. He's considered something of a loose cannon at City Council meetings, where the sight of him rising from his chair and clearing his throat causes half the room to lean forward in anticipation

== Mayor of Baltimore (1999–2007) ==
=== Elections ===
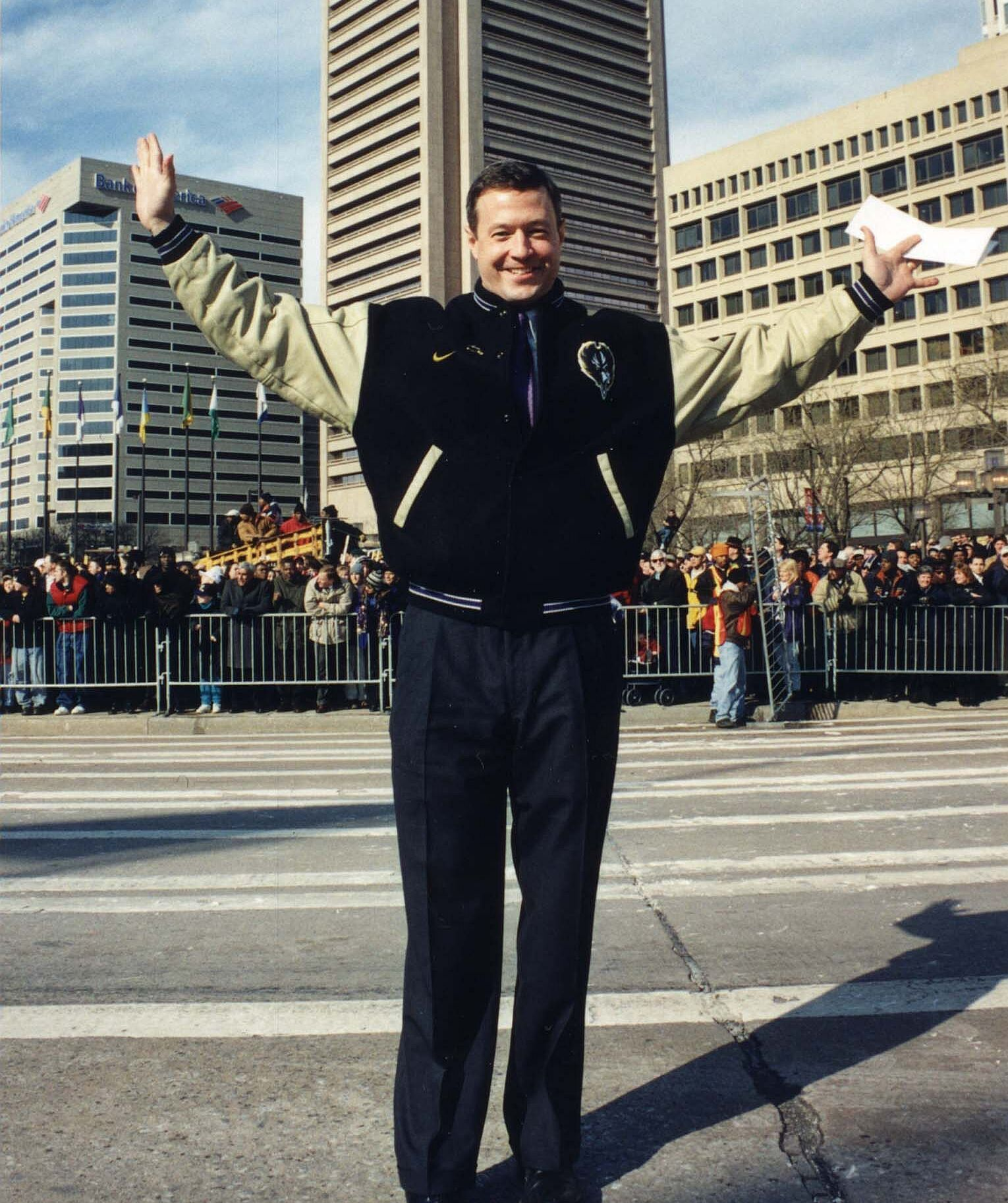
O'Malley in 2001

O'Malley announced his decision to run for Mayor of Baltimore in 1999, after incumbent Kurt Schmoke decided not to seek re-election to a third term. His entrance into the race was greatly unexpected, and he faced initial difficulties as the only white candidate for mayor of a city which had been predominantly African-American since the 1960 Census and had recently had two successive black mayors. His strongest opponents in the crowded Democratic primary of seven were former City Councilman Carl Stokes, Baltimore Registrar of Wills Mary Conaway, and Council President Lawrence Bell. In his campaign, O'Malley focused on reducing crime and received the endorsement of several key African-American lawmakers and church leaders, as well as that of former mayor of Baltimore and Maryland governor William Donald Schaefer, who had served from 1971 to 1987. On September 14, he won the Democratic primary with a 53% majority and went on to win the general election with 90% of the vote, defeating Republican Party nominee, developer David Tufaro.

In 2003, O'Malley ran for re-election. He was challenged in the Democratic primary by four candidates, but defeated them with 67% of the vote. He had to wait more than a year to run in the general election because of a conflict between Maryland election law and the Baltimore city charter. At the same time that O'Malley won his first term, Baltimore citizens voted to move municipal elections to coincide with presidential elections. However, Maryland law gives the General Assembly sole power to set primary election dates, and the General Assembly refused to move the mayoral primary. In the November 4, 2004, general election, he was reelected with 87% of the vote. Due to the conflict, he was only elected to a three-year term rather than the usual four-year term.

=== Police and crime ===
During his first mayoral campaign, O'Malley focused on a message of reducing crime. In his first year in office, he adopted a statistics-based tracking system called "CitiStat", modeled after Compstat, a crime-management program first employed in the mid-1990s in New York City. The system logged every call for service into a database for analysis. The Washington Post wrote in 2006 that Baltimore's "homicide rate remains stubbornly high and its public school test scores disappointingly low. But CitiStat has saved an estimated $350 million and helped generate the city's first budget surplus in years." In 2004, the CitiStat accountability tool won Harvard University's "Innovations in American Government" award. The system garnered interest from not only Washington, D.C. Mayor Adrian Fenty but even crime specialists from Britain.

His record as mayor of Baltimore has drawn criticism. O'Malley has been accused by many of establishing a zero-tolerance policing strategy, aimed at reducing the city's high murder rate but that instead led to the targeting and abuse of black communities.

While running for governor in 2006, O'Malley said violent crime in Baltimore declined 37% while he was mayor. That statistic came from an audit of crime that used questionable methodology and became the subject of controversy; he was accused by both his Democratic primary opponent Doug Duncan and his Republican opponent, incumbent Governor Bob Ehrlich, of manipulating statistics to make false claims. The Washington Post wrote at the time that "no evidence has surfaced of a systemic manipulation of crime statistics," but that "there is no quick or definitive way for O'Malley to prove his numbers are right."

=== Politics ===
O'Malley spoke at the 2004 Democratic National Convention, arguing that 2004 Democratic presidential nominee John Kerry was a better choice for homeland security than President George W. Bush. In early 2005, Governor Robert Ehrlich fired aide Joseph Steffen for spreading rumors of marital infidelity about O'Malley on the Internet. O'Malley and his wife had previously held a highly publicized press conference to deny the rumors and accuse Republicans of partisan politics, although discussions in which Steffen posted the rumors were initiated by an anonymous user under the pseudonym "MD4Bush" who was later found to be Maryland Democratic Party official Ryan O'Doherty.

During a 2005 conference at the National Press Club, where mayors from across the U.S. gathered to denounce President George W. Bush's proposed budget, O'Malley compared the budget to the 9/11 terrorist attacks, declaring, "Back on September 11, terrorists attacked our metropolitan cores, two of America's great cities. They did that because they knew that was where they could do the most damage and weaken us the most. Years later, we are given a budget proposal by our commander in chief. ... And with a budget ax, he is attacking America's cities. He is attacking our metropolitan core." For this he was criticized by not only Republicans but fellow Democrats, and in a subsequent interview said he "in no way intended to equate these budget cuts, however bad, to a terrorist attack."

=== Other matters ===
O'Malley's data-forward approach extended beyond policing, affecting many other areas of city management. An example of this was that his administration took measurement of the time it took to repair the city's infrastructure in order to inform their approach to such work.

In 2002, O'Malley submitted a bid for the city to be the host of the 2004 Democratic Convention. This bid was considered a long-shot, as the city lacked a standard venue of sufficient space and capacity to host a major party presidential nominating convention. Baltimore's bid proposed the unusual solution of erecting a temporary canopy at Oriole Park at Camden Yards in order to provide a venue. If Camden Yards were to host such a convention, it was likely that the Baltimore Orioles would have needed vacate the venue for a roughly two-month period of their 2004 season. Of the five cities to enter bids, Baltimore was the only one not considered as a finalist to host the convention, which was ultimately awarded to Boston.

=== Media attention ===
In 2002, at the age of 39, O'Malley was named "The Best Young Mayor in the Country" by Esquire; and in 2005, Time magazine named him one of America's "Top 5 Big City Mayors". In August 2005, Business Week Magazine Online called him one of five "new stars" in the Democratic Party, along with Senator and future President Barack Obama of Illinois, future Senator Mark Warner of Virginia, future Interior Secretary Ken Salazar and future chief of staff for President Obama and Chicago Mayor Rahm Emanuel. Business Week declared that O'Malley "has become the Party's go-to guy on protecting the homeland. The telegenic Mayor has developed a detailed plan for rail and port safety and has been an outspoken critic of White House security priorities."

== Governor of Maryland (2007–2015) ==
=== Elections ===
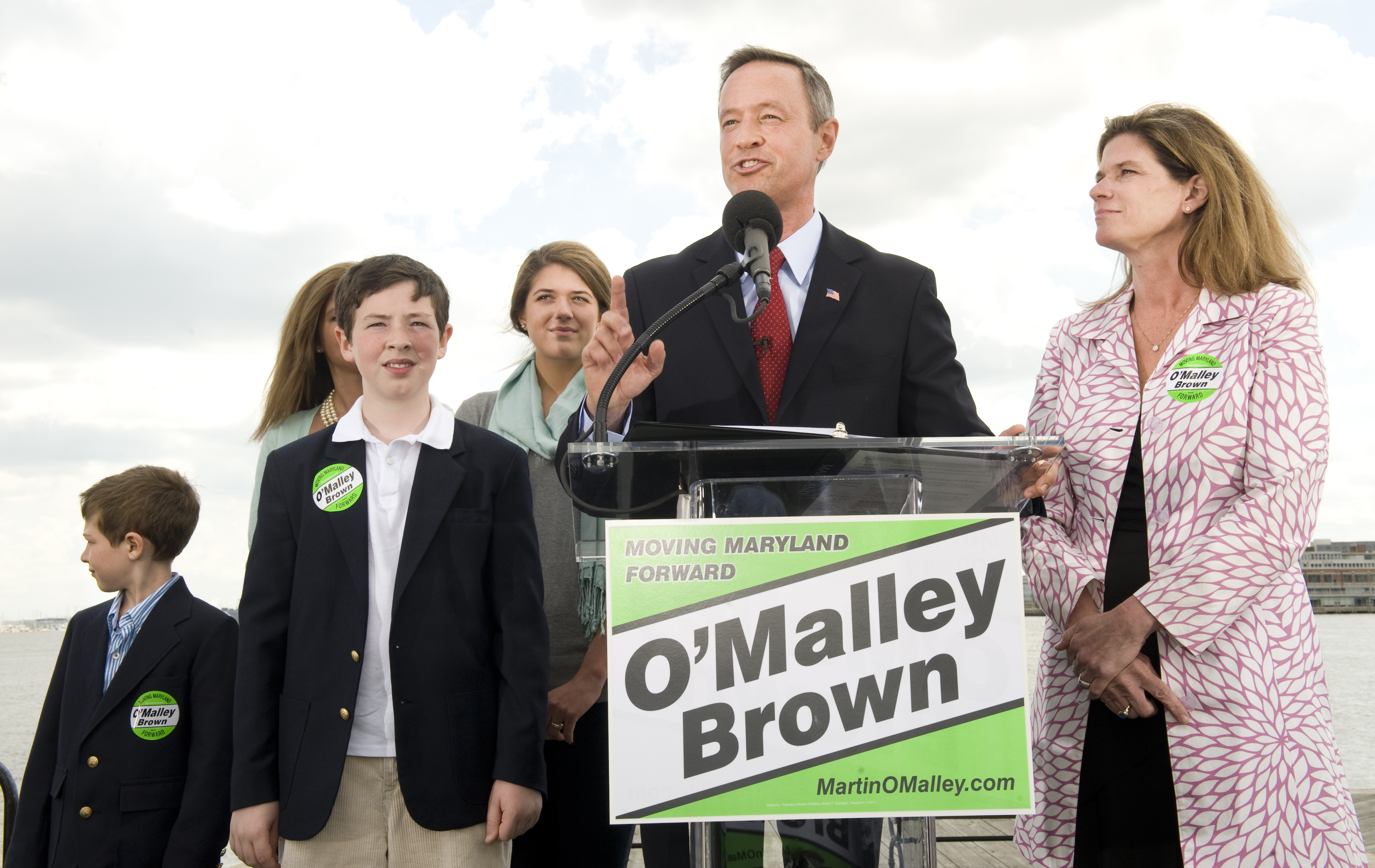
O'Malley announces his gubernatorial campaign in Baltimore.

==== 2006 ====
O'Malley considered a run for governor in the 2002 election but decided not to run. In October 2005, after much speculation, he officially announced he would run in the 2006 election. He had one primary opponent, Montgomery County Executive Doug Duncan, who abruptly dropped out in June a few days after being diagnosed with clinical depression and endorsed O'Malley, who thus became the Democratic Party nominee with no primary opposition, challenging incumbent Bob Ehrlich. He selected Delegate Anthony Brown of Prince George's County as his running mate for lieutenant governor.

The Baltimore Sun endorsed O'Malley, saying: "When he was first elected mayor in 1999, the former two-term city councilman inherited a city of rising crime, failing schools, and shrinking economic prospects. He was able to reverse course in all of these areas." The Washington Post endorsed his opponent, but noted that O'Malley, while "not solv[ing] the problems of rampant crime and rough schools in Baltimore," had "put a dent in them" while criticizing his gubernatorial campaign for being too focused on Baltimore and offering "little of substance" on Washington-area issues. The Washington Times complained that O'Malley, along with the Maryland General Assembly, had moved too far to the left. O'Malley led by margins of several points in most polls during the campaign, but polls tightened significantly in the last week of the campaign. He ultimately defeated Ehrlich 53% to 46% in the November 7, 2006, general election.

Major land developer Edward St. John was fined $55,000 by the Maryland Office of the State Prosecutor for making illegal contributions to the 2006 O'Malley gubernatorial campaign. The Washington Times reported later that the Governor's administration had issued a press release touting a new $28-million highway interchange leading from Interstate 795 to one of St. John's properties. Governor O'Malley's spokesman said there was no "quid pro quo," and a spokesman for the County Executive said the project had been a county transportation priority since before both O'Malley and the executive were elected.

==== 2008 ====
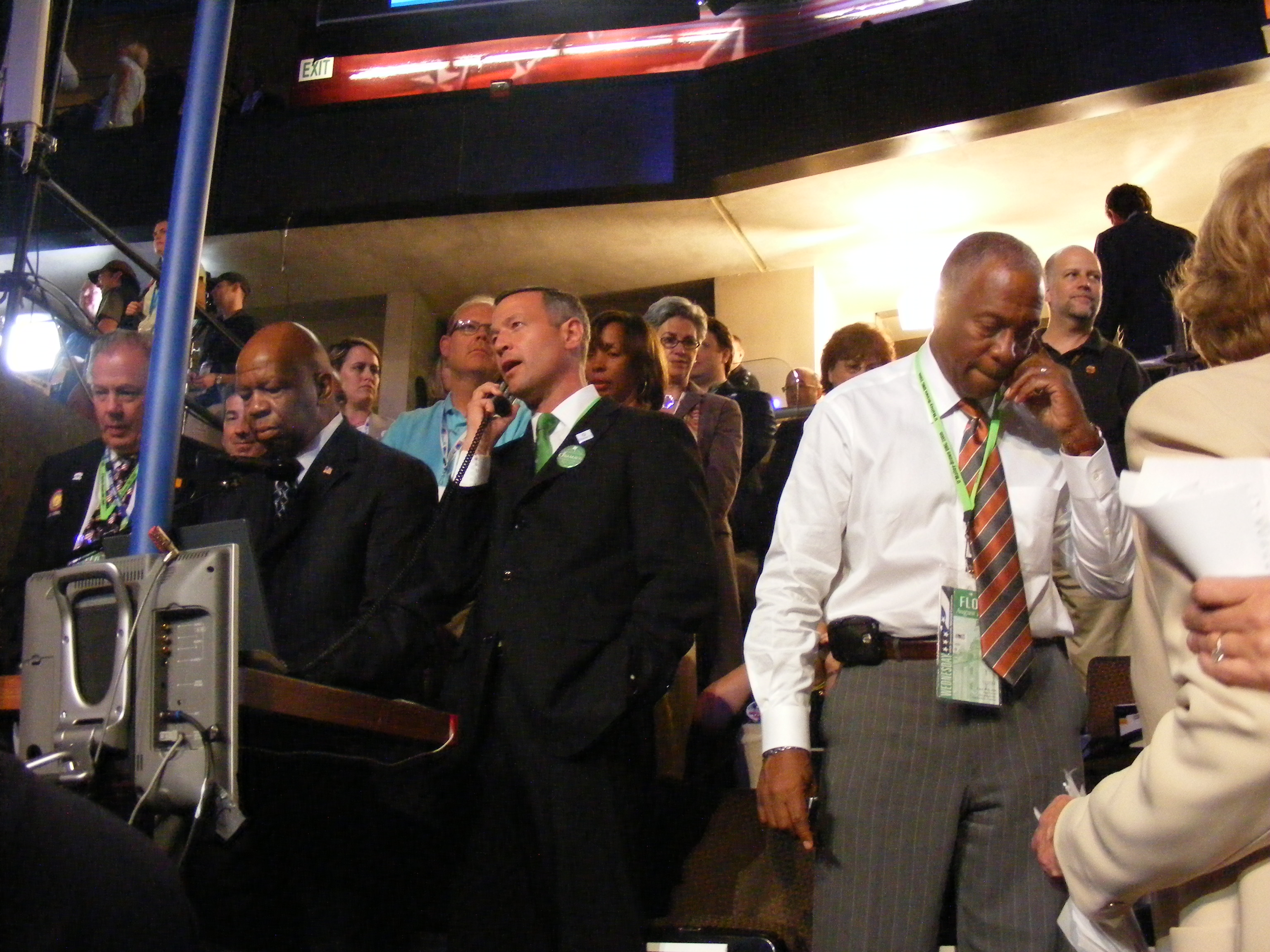

During the Democratic Primary Campaign for President of the United States between Illinois Senator Barack Obama and former Secretary of State Hillary Clinton, O'Malley supported Clinton. O'Malley was an early supporter of the Clinton Campaign, endorsing her in 2007, becoming the second sitting governor to do so. He also served as the chairman of her campaign in Maryland and helped to raise $100,000 for the campaign. Obama won the Maryland primary with more than 60% of the vote.

==== 2010 ====
In 2010, O'Malley announced his intention to run for re-election while Ehrlich announced he would also run, setting up a rematch of 2006. His future rival for the Democratic presidential nomination, Hillary Clinton, said in a private email at the time that "he should be reelected by acclamation for steering the ship of state so well." Despite major losses for Democrats nationwide, O'Malley defeated Ehrlich in a landslide 56% to 42%, receiving just over a million votes. Due to term limits, he was unable to run for a third term in 2014.

=== First term ===
==== Budget ====
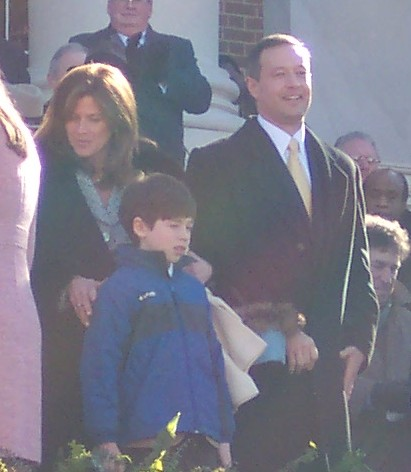
O'Malley and his family at his inauguration in 2007.

O'Malley called a special session of the General Assembly in November 2007 to close a projected budget deficit of $1.7 billion for 2008–2009, in which he and other lawmakers passed a tax plan that would raise total state tax collections by 14%. In April 2009, he signed the traffic speed camera enforcement law he had supported and fought for to help raise revenue to try to overcome an imminent state deficit. Through his strenuous lobbying, the measure was revived after an initial defeat and passed on a second vote.

==== Maryland StateStat ====
One of O'Malley's first actions as governor was to implement the same CitiStat system he used to manage the city Baltimore as mayor on a statewide level. Maryland StateStat was first tried in 2007 by a few public safety and human services agencies. By 2014, over 20 agencies were engaged in the StateStat process through monthly individual agency meetings and quarterly cross-agency Stats including BayStat, StudentStat, VetStat and ReEntryStat. (The EPA would later base its ChesapeakeStat program on O'Malley's innovative BayStat program.) In 2012, he launched Maryland's Open Data Portal- StateStat, which used the data in the Portal to track progress towards his 16 strategic goals. As one of the few states at the time linking progress directly to open data, Maryland led the nation in government transparency and accountability. O'Malley has said that President Obama has looked at StateStat as a potential model for tracking stimulus funding.

==== Democratic Party ====
O'Malley was elected as the vice chairman of the Democratic Governors Association for 2009–2010, and on December 1, 2010, he was elected chairman for 2010–2011.

==== Crime ====
Soon after entering office, O'Malley closed the Maryland House of Correction in Jessup, a notoriously violent maximum-security prison.

==== National popular vote ====
In April 2007, O'Malley became the first governor to sign legislation entering a state into the National Popular Vote Interstate Compact. Designed to reform how states allocate their electoral votes, the national popular vote plan has since been enacted in fourteen additional states and the District of Columbia.

=== Second term ===
==== Immigration ====
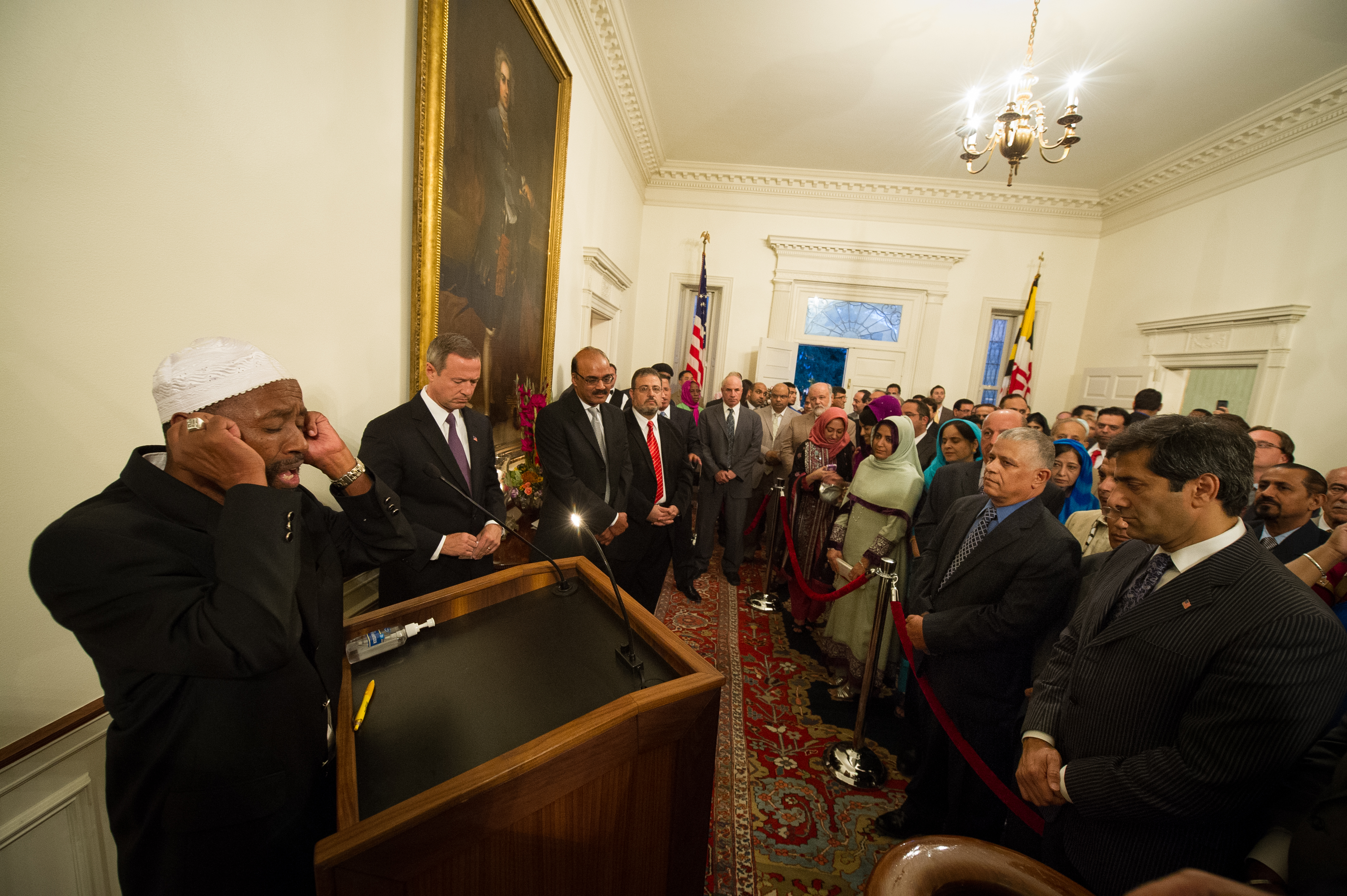
O'Malley at the Maryland State House's Iftar reception during Ramadan in August 2013

In a debate during the 2010 campaign, O'Malley referred to undocumented immigrants as "new Americans" while endorsing stricter enforcement against illegal immigration by the federal government. In May 2011, he signed a law making the children of undocumented immigrants eligible for in-state college tuition under certain conditions. The law provides that undocumented immigrants can be eligible for in-state tuition if they have attended a high school in Maryland for three years, and if they or their parents have paid state income taxes during that time. In response, Delegate Neil Parrott created an online petition to suspend the law pending a referendum to be voted on in the 2012 general election. On November 6, 2012, a majority (58%) of state voters passed referendum Question 4 in support of the law O'Malley had signed.

During the 2014 crisis involving undocumented immigrant children from Central America crossing the border, O'Malley refused to open a facility in Westminster, Maryland, to house them. The White House criticized his decision as hypocritical given his prior comments that he thought deporting all these children was wrong, but he protested that his remarks had been mischaracterized.

==== Same-sex marriage ====
O'Malley supported a bill considered by the General Assembly to legalize same-sex marriage in Maryland in 2011, even though Archbishop of Baltimore Edwin O'Brien had urged him as a Catholic not to support the bill in a private letter sent two days before O'Malley voiced his support. "I am well aware that the recent events in New York have intensified pressure on you to lend your active support to legislation to redefine marriage," O'Brien wrote. "As advocates for the truths we are compelled to uphold, we speak with equal intensity and urgency in opposition to your promoting a goal that so deeply conflicts with your faith, not to mention the best interests of our society." O'Malley responded, "I do not presume, nor would I ever presume as Governor, to question or infringe upon your freedom to define, to preach about, and to administer the sacraments of the Roman Catholic Church. But on the public issue of granting equal civil marital rights to same-sex couples, you and I disagree."

The Maryland House of Delegates approved this bill by 72–67 on February 17, 2012 and the Maryland State Senate passed it by a 25–22 margin on February 23. It was amended to take effect only on January 1, 2013, pending a voter referendum. After O'Malley signed the bill on March 1, 2012, referendum petitioners collected the necessary signatures required to challenge the law, but Referendum Question 6 in support of same-sex marriage passed by 52.4% on November 6, 2012.

==== Animal welfare ====
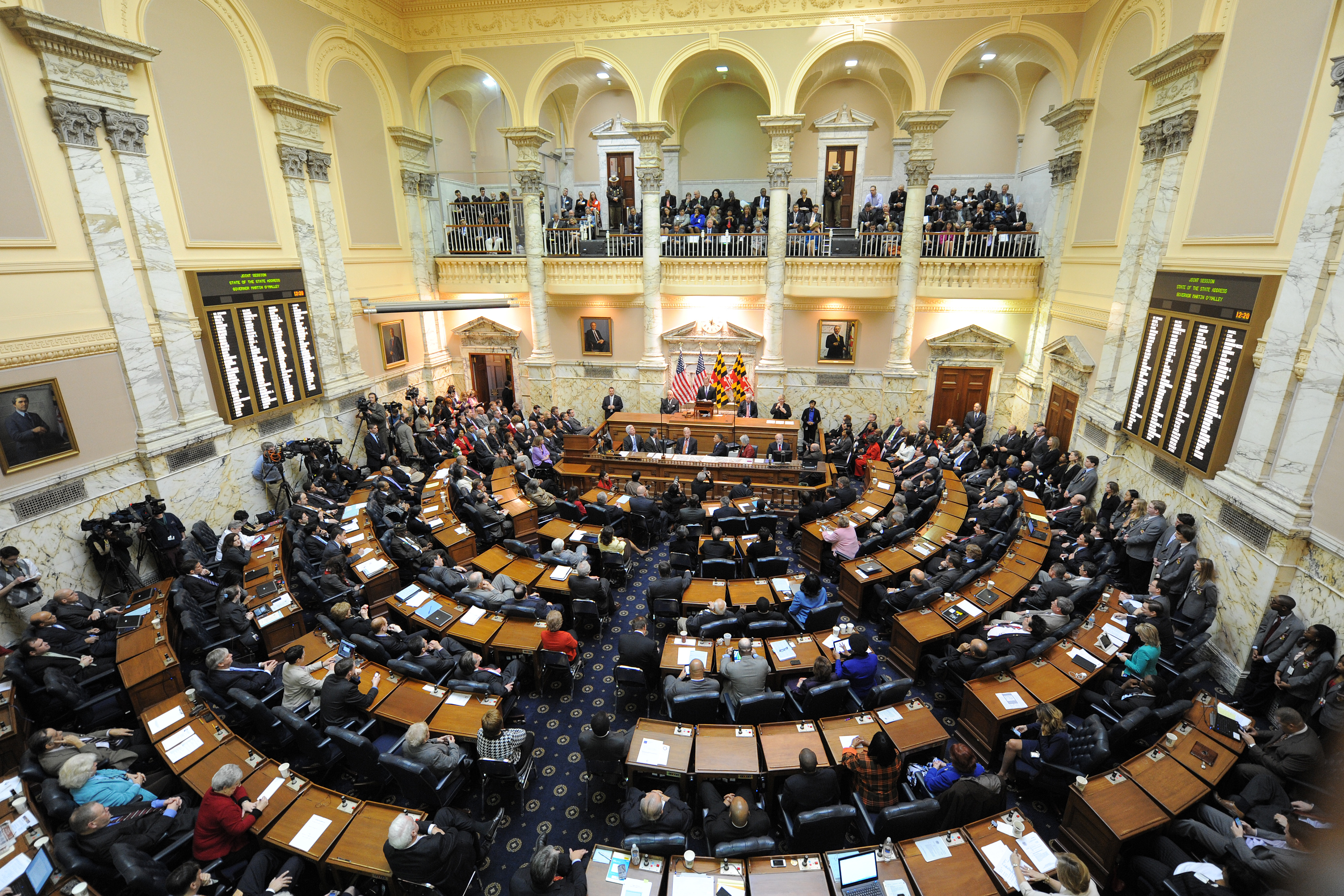
O'Malley giving the State of the State Address in 2013.

In 2013, O'Malley signed a bill to ban the practice of shark finning in Maryland, making it the sixth U.S. state to enact this regulation. The signature of this bill made Maryland the first East Coast state to make it illegal to possess, sell, trade or distribute shark fins.

==== Environment ====
O'Malley opposed a 2011 lawsuit filed by the Waterkeeper Alliance, Inc. against Perdue Farms, a poultry agribusiness corporation based in Maryland. The lawsuit accused Perdue of allowing run-off phosphorus pollution from one of its contact farms into Chesapeake Bay. In 2014, he also promised to veto the Poultry Fair Share Act which would require poultry companies in Maryland to pay taxes to clean up the Chesapeake Bay equal to the existing cleanup taxes required of Maryland citizens.

Also in 2014, O'Malley approved the practice of hydraulic fracturing, or "fracking," in western Maryland but only on condition of tight regulations. He had previously blocked the technique from the region for three years, awaiting the report from the Marcellus Shale Advisory Commission on the risks and benefits of this controversial procedure.

In December 2014, O'Malley issued an executive order to drive a Zero-Waste future for Maryland, but the plan was later cancelled by O'Malley's successor Larry Hogan in 2017 "in response to complaints from local governments.

==== Capital punishment ====
O'Malley, a long-time opponent of capital punishment, signed a bill on May 2, 2013, that repealed capital punishment in Maryland for all future offenders. Although the repeal did not affect the five inmates then on death row in Maryland, O'Malley commuted the sentences of four of them to life imprisonment without the possibility of parole.

==== Gun control ====
O'Malley supported gun control in his second term. On May 16, 2013, he signed a new gun control bill into law.

==== Reproductive rights ====
O'Malley supports legal abortion rights without government interference, up to the point of fetal viability. In Maryland fetus viability is defined as when, in a doctor's best medical judgment, there is a reasonable likelihood of the fetus' sustained survival outside the uterus, which on average is 22–24 weeks.

== 2016 presidential campaign ==
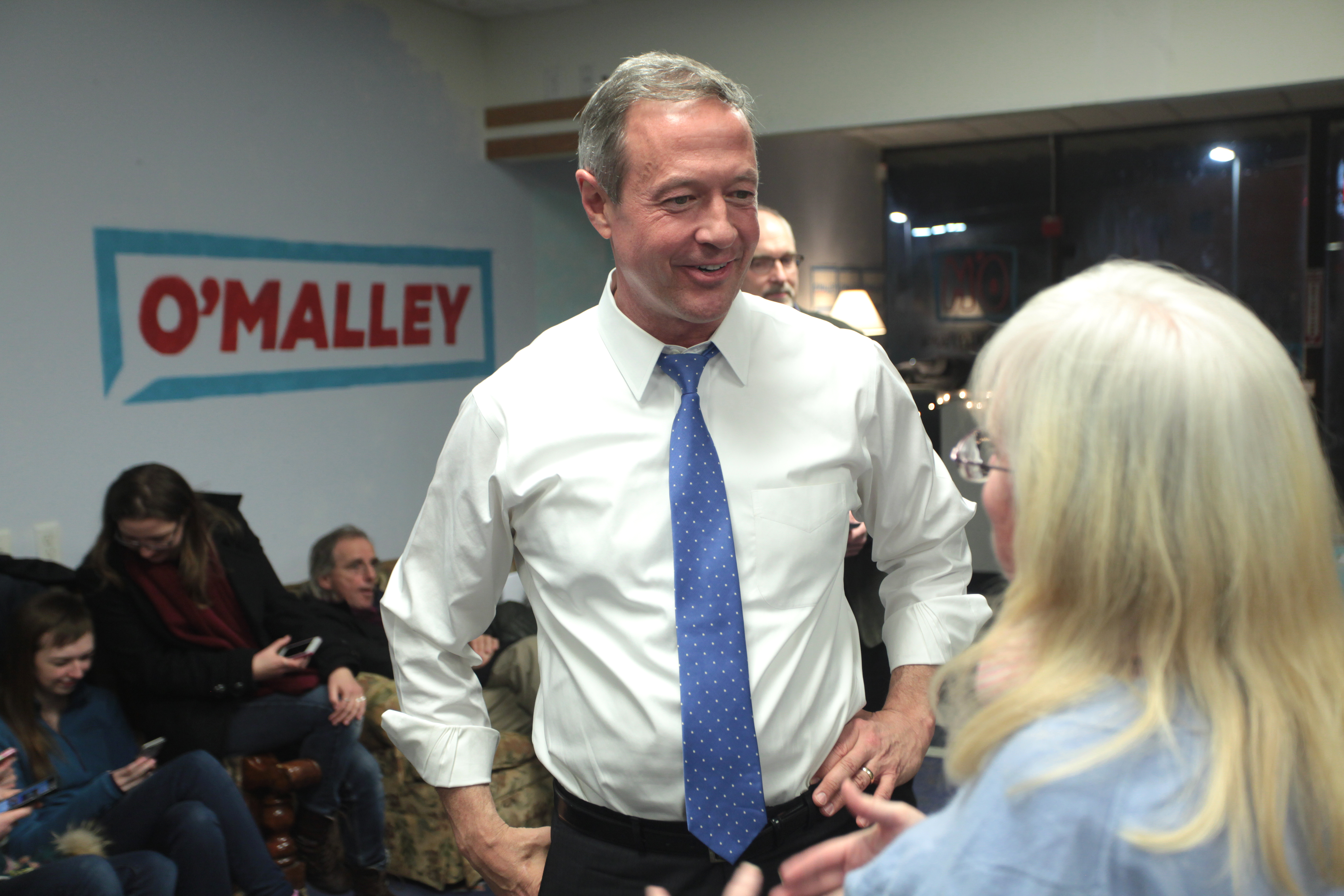
O'Malley on the campaign trail in Manchester, New Hampshire

After O'Malley stood in for 2008 Democratic presidential candidate Hillary Clinton at a Democratic campaign event on June 2, 2007, in New Hampshire, Maryland's Republican House Minority Leader Tony O'Donnell said in response, "It's the worst-kept secret in Maryland that the governor has national ambitions." State Senate President Thomas V. Miller Jr. said O'Malley's political future "comes into play in everything he does", adding O'Malley is "very much like Bill Clinton in being slow and deliberative and calculating in everything he does." Speculation about O'Malley's plans was further fueled by his high-profile at the 2012 Democratic National Convention, where he was given a prime-time speaking slot on the second night and spoke to delegations from several states including Iowa, where the first presidential caucuses are held in election years, and Ohio, a key swing state in recent presidential elections. O'Malley's prominence at the convention generated both support for, and criticism of, his record. U.S. Senator Ben Cardin and Howard County Executive Ken Ulman praised his speech, with Ulman saying, "To borrow a catchphrase from his address, his career is moving forward, not back."

O'Malley publicly expressed interest in a presidential run in 2016 on multiple occasions. At a press conference in Milwaukee, Wisconsin, and at a National Governors Association meeting in August 2013, he admitted he was laying "the framework" for a presidential run. In October 2014, he discussed some of his potential policies as president during a panel discussion with Paul Hawken and Tom Steyer. In April 2015, he said he expected to make a decision on the race by the end of May.

After months of consideration, O'Malley indicated on Twitter that he would announce his candidacy on May 30, 2015, at Baltimore's historic Federal Hill Park, overlooking the city's picturesque downtown skyline and the Inner Harbor. On that date, he formally announced his candidacy for the 2016 presidential nomination.

On February 1, 2016, after performing poorly in the Iowa caucuses, however, he suspended his campaign, receiving only 0.6% of state delegate equivalents awarded in the Iowa caucuses while both former First Lady, U.S. Senator and Secretary of State Hillary Clinton of New York and Senator Bernie Sanders of Vermont received over 49% each. After suspending his campaign, the former Maryland governor gave a speech, saying:

Tonight, I have to tell you that I am suspending this Presidential bid. But I am not ending this fight. Our country is worth saving, the American dream is worth saving, and this planet is worth saving. So as we march forward to the fall, let us all resolve together that the love, the generosity, the compassion and the commitment of this campaign will continue to point our country forward.

Four months later, on June 9, 2016, O'Malley officially endorsed Hillary Clinton.

== Subsequent work ==
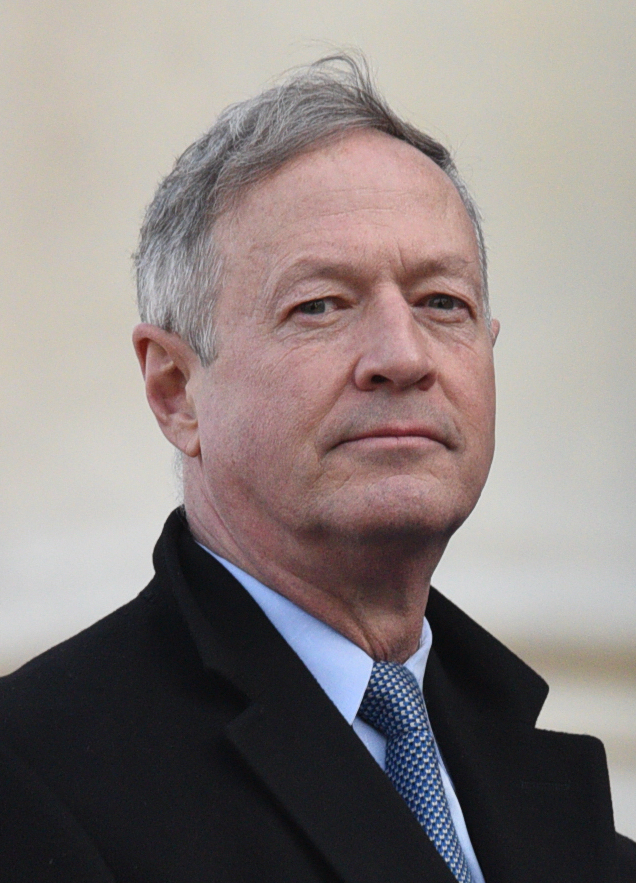
O'Malley in January 2023

After the end of his presidential campaign, there was speculation that O'Malley was a possible choice for United States Secretary of Homeland Security, should Hillary Clinton be elected president. This speculation was rendered moot as Donald Trump was instead elected, eventually choosing John F. Kelly.

On May 5, 2016, O'Malley joined the MetroLab Network, a group focusing on city–university partnerships and based at Heinz College (the public policy school of Carnegie Mellon University) in Pittsburgh, Pennsylvania. He was appointed chairman of the advisory committee and made a senior fellow. O'Malley was subsequently made a fellow of the Institute of Politics and Public Service at Georgetown University in Washington, D.C. After the Democratic primaries, O'Malley explored a potential run for chair of the Democratic National Committee. He later withdrew interest after Minnesota representative Keith Ellison received the endorsements of several major Democratic figures.

In June 2016, Boston College Law School's Rappaport Center for Law and Public Policy announced that O'Malley would be its inaugural Jerome Lyle Rappaport Visiting Professor and teach at the law school during the Spring 2017 semester.

The Baltimore Sun reported on June 1, 2017, that O'Malley admitted he, along with other Democrats, gerrymandered the state's 6th district in a successful effort to oust long-time Republican incumbent Rep. Roscoe Bartlett in 2012. In a deposition, O'Malley stated "It was also my intent to create...a district where the people would be more likely to elect a Democrat than a Republican."

In November 2019, O'Malley encountered acting deputy secretary of the Department of Homeland Security, Ken Cuccinelli II, in a Capitol Hill bar and confronted him with what The Washington Post reported one witness described as a "shame-invoking tirade" centering on the Trump administration's immigration policies. Also in 2019, O'Malley was elected to be a fellow of the National Academy of Public Administration.

== Commissioner of the Social Security Administration (2023–2024) ==
In July 2023, President Joe Biden announced he would nominate O'Malley to lead the Social Security Administration (SSA). The agency is headquartered in the suburbs west of Baltimore. On November 3, 2023, a confirmation hearing was held at the United States Capitol for the United States Senate Committee on Finance, where he reportedly received a positive reception. During his confirmation hearing, O'Malley vowed to focus on improving the agency's customer service area and "boosting the morale" of the SSA. The committee ultimately voted to advance his nomination in a 17–10 vote. His nomination was confirmed on December 18, 2023, by the United States Senate by a 50–11 vote. He was sworn in on December 20, 2023. Prior to his confirmation, the agency had lacked a permanent Senate-confirmed head since July 2021. Since O'Malley was confirmed merely to complete the remainder of the unexpired term to which Andrew Saul had previously been appointed, his appointment would have expired in January 2025 had he not resigned sooner.

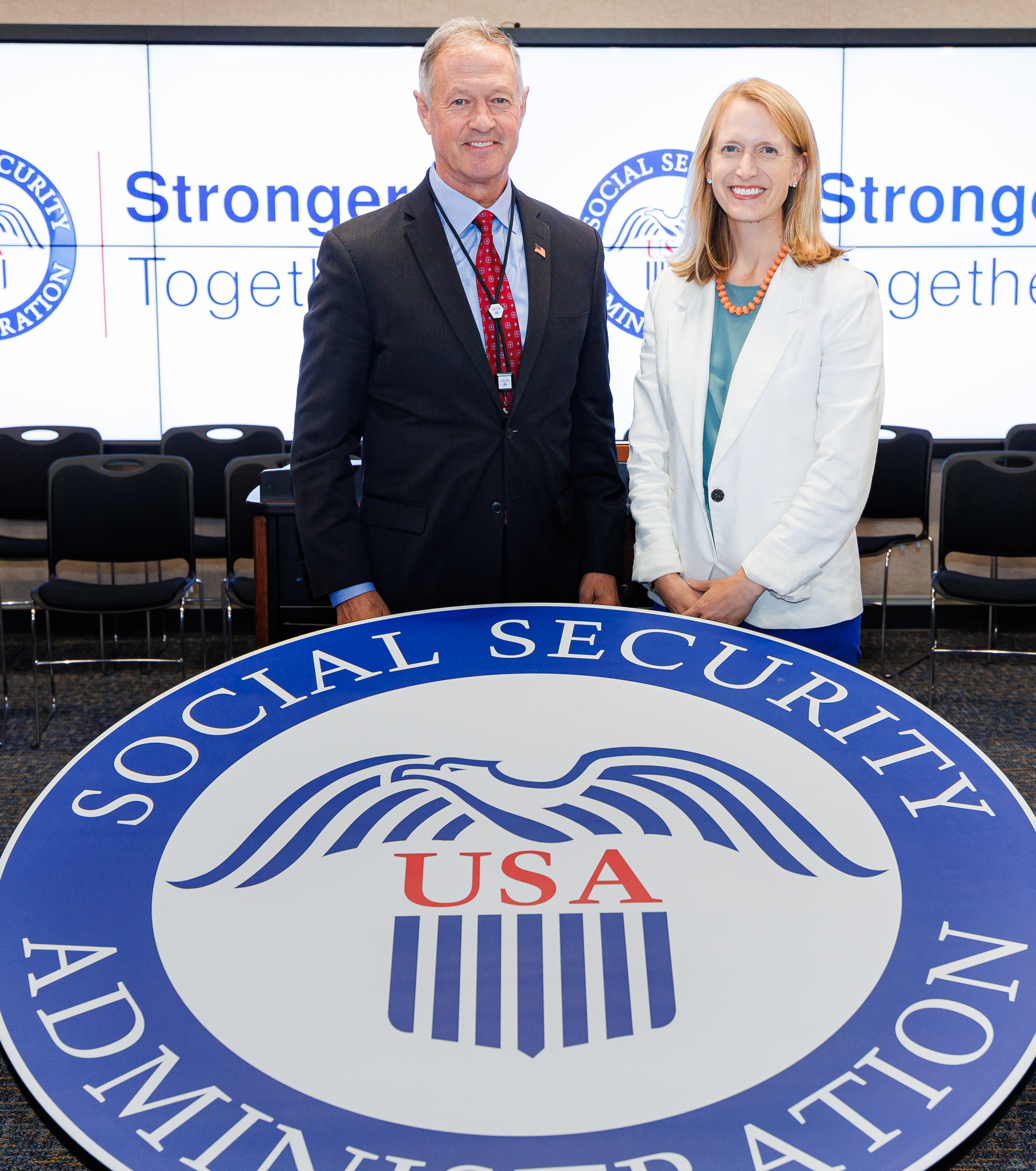
O'Malley with Brooke Lierman at a SSA STAT meeting, July 2024

Lisa Rein of The Washington Post described O'Malley as assuming leadership of an agency that had been afflicted by numerous challenges, including the impact left by the aftermath of the COVID-19 pandemic, a shrunken agency workforce (its lowest in decades), poor employee morale, and issues with efficiency. O'Malley described improving its customer service as his first priority.

O'Malley instituted a number of changes to the agency's operations after assuming leadership. One change has been simplifying forms (such as creating a "no to all" option on applications), removing excess requirements, and utilizing data exchange to decrease duplication. He has also worked to increase the shared distribution of workloads between different offices. He has also increased digitization, which has including expanding document upload and esignature access for staff and increasing the agencies "digital-first" approach to mail.

O'Malley has utilized his data-driven approach to leadership in this role. At the time that O'Malley assumed leadership, the agency was struggling with a significant backlog of pending claims in its disability program (a record-high 1 million). O'Malley analyzed data to find that the two greatest contributors to the length of processing times for claims were in state agency reviews and Social Security Agency-run hearings. The reviewed data also showed that the severity backlogs varied greatly between states. In response to these findings, O'Malley has pursued having the workload of handling claims be more flexibly shared, and has also sought greater engagement with external advocacy groups.

In a joint May 2024 commentary praising O'Malley as having been "the commissioner Social Security needs", former U.S. congressmen Earl Pomeroy (a Democrat) and Dave Camp (a Republican) praised O'Malley as making positive changes, "with diligence and speed, changing SSA's policies and procedures faster than advocates have seen in generations." They particularly praised his ending of the agency's practice of intercepting 100% of the monthly benefit of overpaid beneficiaries, instead making the default withholding rate 10%. Calling the previous practice "heavy-handed," they credited O'Malley as, "reframing SSA's guidance to shift the burdens and presumptions to a more just balance [...] making it easier for beneficiaries to ask SSA to consider that — in some circumstances — they both cannot repay and were not at fault."

== 2025 Democratic National Committee chair candidacy ==
O'Malley resigned from the Social Security Administration on November 29, 2024, in order to launch his candidacy in the February 2025 election of a new Democratic National Committee chairperson. On February 1, 2025, he came in third with 44 votes in the DNC Chair race after winner Ken Martin.

== In popular culture ==
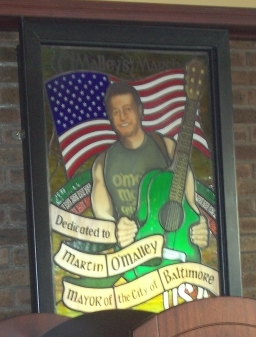
Stained-glass portrait of O'Malley at O' Sheas, Dublin.

According to David Simon, the creator of the HBO drama The Wire, the show's fictional mayor of Baltimore Tommy Carcetti is "not O'Malley," but O'Malley was one of several inspirations. Writing in Baltimore Magazine several years after the show had closed, Simon did disclose a private phone conversation with O'Malley as production of the show's second season was beginning, in which the mayor urged that the show's contents be changed to put Baltimore and his own administration in a better light, and threatened the show's continuation in Baltimore unless such changes were made.

O'Malley appeared in the film Ladder 49 as himself. He is a War of 1812 buff. History Channel's 2004 documentary First Invasion: The War of 1812 featured him in a segment regarding the British attack on Baltimore in 1814. He also appeared in the 2014 Travel Channel documentary The War of 1812 Trail. In 2019, he appeared on Ireland's The Late Late Show to discuss his love of Shane MacGowan's music.

== Honors ==
The University of Galway awarded him an honorary degree in 2008.

== Personal life ==
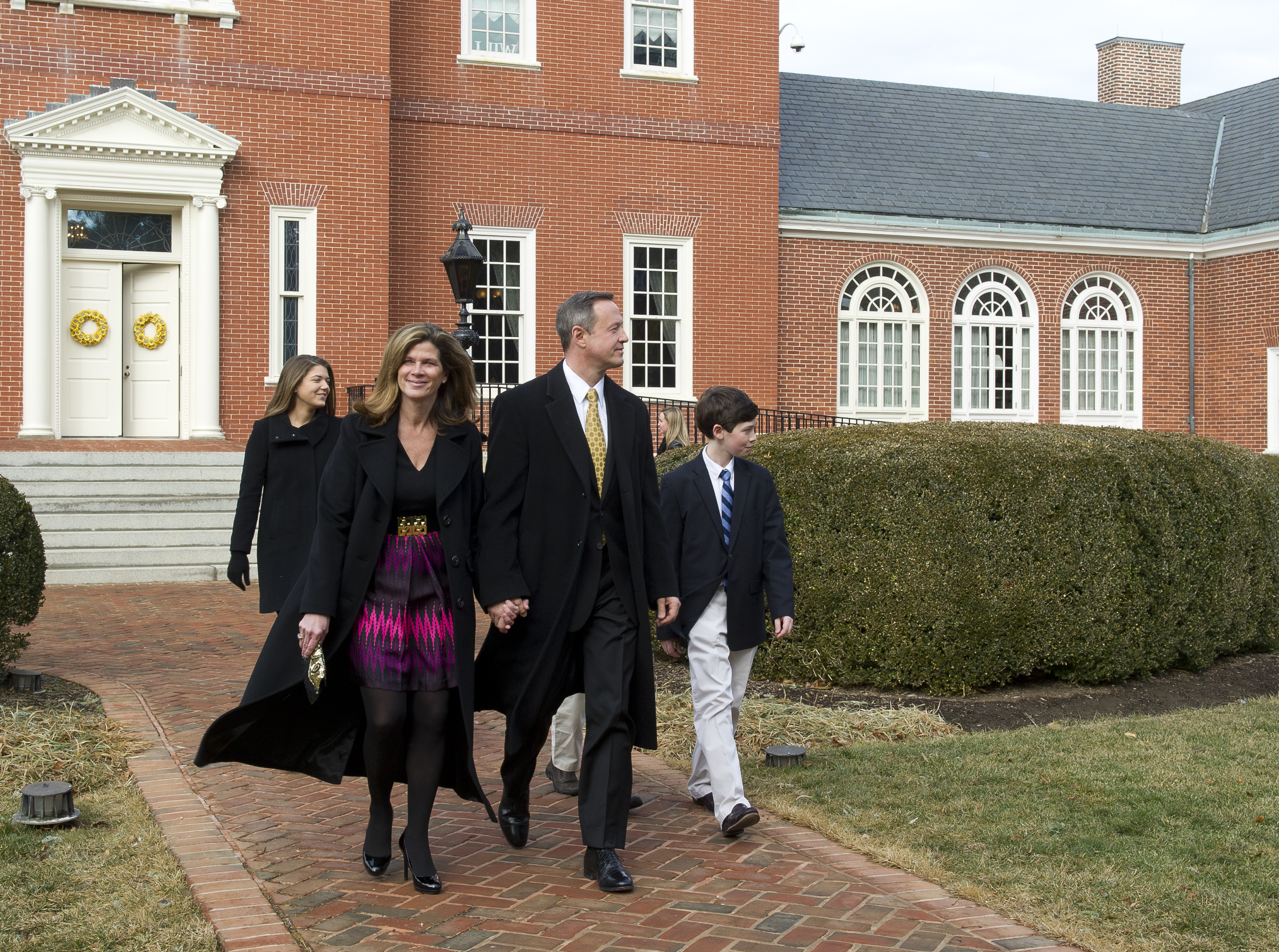
The O'Malley family outside of the Government House (Governor's Mansion) on State Circle in Annapolis in 2011

O'Malley met his wife, Catherine "Katie" Curran, in 1986 while they were both in law school. At the time, he was working on Barbara Mikulski's U.S. Senate campaign and she was working on her father J. Joseph Curran Jr.'s campaign for attorney general of Maryland. They were married in 1990 and are the parents of four children, Grace, Tara, William and Jack. Before the 2006 election, O'Malley's father-in-law, Joseph Curran, citing his age and his long career, decided not to seek re-election for attorney general, preventing any conflict of interest that might arise in having O'Malley as governor.

=== Religion ===
O'Malley is a Catholic, who was educated in Catholic schools and was described by The Washington Post in 2015 as "a pray-every-morning, church-every-Sunday believer."

=== O'Malley's March ===
O'Malley's March
- Origin: Baltimore, Maryland; Washington D.C.
- Genres: Irish rock, folk rock
- Years active: 1988–present
- Label: none
- Members: Martin O'Malley; Jared Denhard; Jamie Wilson; Jim Eagan; Ralph Reinoldi; Sean McComiskey; Pete Miller
- Past members: Danny Costello
- Website: www.facebook.com/pages/OMalleys-March

O'Malley has said that he grew up surrounded by Irish music. While attending Gonzaga College High School in Washington D.C. in 1979, O'Malley and his football coach Danny Costello formed a band, Shannon Tide, which played Irish music and folk rock. After graduating from University of Maryland Law School, O'Malley went solo for a year. In 1988, he founded the Baltimore-based Celtic rock band O'Malley's March, in which he is still the lead singer and plays acoustic guitar and penny whistle. In addition to Irish music, the band's mainstays include June Carter Cash and Merle Kilgore's "Ring of Fire," Woody Guthrie's "This Land Is Your Land," the parlor song "Hard Times Come Again No More," The Pogues ' "Body of an American" and Passenger's "Scare Away The Dark". During O'Malley's mayoralty he wrote and performed a number of songs celebrating his adopted city and its strong Irish heritage.

As the bicentennial of the War of 1812 approached in 2012–2015, while still Governor he and his compatriots celebrated the British defeat in the "Battle for Baltimore" and other musical numbers at a stirring concert in Patterson Park in East Baltimore on the anniversary of the land and sea attack on Defenders' Day in September 2014. In addition to more traditional venues, the band performs for O'Malley's campaign events. In 2012, it played at the White House for 44th President Barack Obama as part of an extended Saint Patrick's Day celebration honoring Irish Prime Minister Enda Kenny. O'Malley's March continues to perform following O'Malley's decision to end his 2016 presidential campaign. Through O'Malley's March, he has become close to Leo Moran and other members of The Saw Doctors.

== Ancestry ==
O'Malley's father was of Irish descent; his paternal ancestors come from An Mám, County Galway. His matrilineal ancestry includes Irish, German, Dutch and Scottish. He is a member of the Maryland Society of the Sons of the American Revolution and the General Society of the War of 1812.

== Electoral history ==
Mayor of Baltimore

Baltimore City Democratic mayoral primary, 1999
Party	Candidate	Votes	%	±%
Democratic	Martin O'Malley	62,711	53.2%	+25.5
Democratic	Carl Stokes	32,609	27.7	−25.5
Democratic	Lawrence Bell	20,034	17.0	−36.2
Democratic	Other	2,444	2.1	N/A

1999 Baltimore City mayoral general election
Party	Candidate	Votes	%	±%
Democratic	Martin O'Malley	87,607	90.5%	+81.0
Republican	David F. Tufaro	9,207	9.5	−81.0

Governor of Maryland

2006 Maryland gubernatorial election
Party	Candidate	Votes	%	±%
Democratic	Martin O'Malley	942,279	52.7%	+5.0
Republican	Robert Ehrlich (incumbent)	825,464	46.2%	−5.4

2010 Maryland gubernatorial election
Party	Candidate	Votes	%	±%
Democratic	Martin O'Malley (incumbent)	1,044,961	56.2%	+3.5
Republican	Robert Ehrlich	776,319	41.8	−4.4

== See also ==
- 2016 Democratic Party presidential candidates

== Bibliography ==
- Smarter Government: How to Govern for Results in the Information Age. Esri Press. 2019. ISBN 978-1589485242.
- Smarter Government Workbook: A 14-Week Implementation Guide to Governing for Results. Esri Press. 2020. ISBN 978-1589486027.

Political offices
Preceded by Kurt Schmoke	Mayor of Baltimore; 1999–2007	Succeeded by Sheila Dixon
Preceded by Bob Ehrlich	Governor of Maryland; 2007–2015	Succeeded by Larry Hogan
Preceded by Kilolo Kijakazi; Acting	Commissioner of the Social Security Administration; 2023–2024	Succeeded by Carolyn Colvin; Acting
Party political offices
Preceded by Kathleen Kennedy Townsend	Democratic nominee for Governor of Maryland; 2006, 2010	Succeeded by Anthony Brown
Preceded by Jack Markell	Chair of the Democratic Governors Association; 2010–2012	Succeeded by Peter Shumlin
U.S. order of precedence (ceremonial)
Preceded by Bob Ehrlich as Former Governor	Order of precedence of the United States	Succeeded by Larry Hogan as Former Governor
