= Rockcliffe Park Public School =

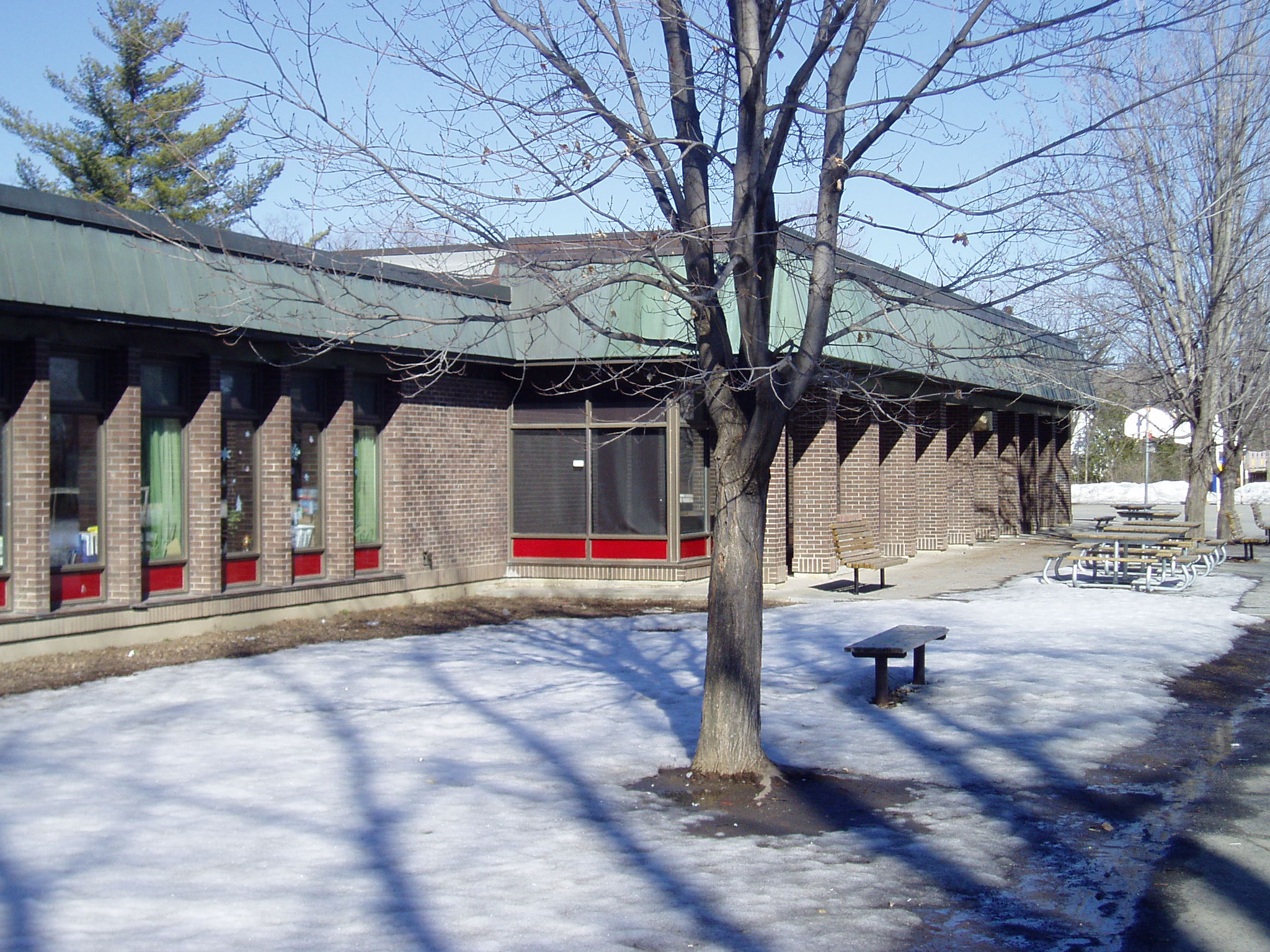

Location
- 350 Buena Vista Road; Ottawa, Ontario, K1M 1C1; Canada; 45.450281°N 75.678077°W

Information
- Founded: 1922; 104 years ago
- School board: Ottawa Carleton District School Board
- Principal: Brian Chiasson
- Staff: 22 teachers
- Grades: JK-6
- Language: English, French
- Campus: Urban
- Colours: Blue and white
- Mascot: Dragon
- Team name: Dragons
- Communities served: Rockcliffe Park, New Edinburgh, Lower Town Byward Market and Sandy Hill
- Feeder schools: Queen Elizabeth Public School, Lisgar Collegiate Institute, Elmwood School (private), Ashbury College (private)
- Website: www.rockcliffeparkps.ocdsb.ca

Rockcliffe Park Public School (RPPS) is a public elementary school in the Rockcliffe Park neighbourhood of Ottawa, Ontario, Canada.

== History ==
The school was founded in 1922. The school is located in the centre of Ottawa's wealthiest neighbourhood. Near the school are Ottawa's two most prominent private schools, Elmwood School and Ashbury College, to which many students move after Rockcliffe.

Rockcliffe Park Public School has long educated the children of politicians and ambassadors. Perhaps the most prominent former students are Princess Beatrix and Princess Irene, who attended the school while the Dutch royal family was in exile during the Second World War. Former Prime Minister Stephen Harper's daughter attended the school, as did his son, the three sons of Pierre Trudeau, including former Prime Minister Justin Trudeau and the children of John Turner. Actor Matthew Perry also attended the school.

== Programs ==
As well as Rockcliffe and neighbouring New Edinburgh, the school also draws students from the Lower Town and Sandy Hill areas of Ottawa, for its French immersion program, in which the majority of students are enrolled. The school is also well known for its annual Book Fair, a used book sale that has acted as a fundraiser for the school for 51 years. Rockcliffe is twinned with Mokoena Primary School in Butha-Buthe, Lesotho. This twinning is helped by the organization Help Lesotho. Rockcliffe Park is the first school in Canada to twin with another school in Lesotho.

Since the school has a major relationship to the Dutch royal family, the Embassy of the Netherlands in Ottawa is partnered with the school.
