= Mimi Lee =

American chemist, athlete, and philanthropist

First Lady of Maryland
- In role June 4, 1977 – January 15, 1979
- Governor: Blair Lee III
- Preceded by: Jeanne Dorsey Mandel
- Succeeded by: Jeanne Dorsey Mandel

Personal details
- Born: Mathilde Boal; May 1, 1920 Washington, D.C., U.S.
- Died: August 9, 2011 (aged 91) Laurel, Maryland, U.S.
- Spouse: Blair Lee III
- Relations: Pierre de Lagarde Boal (father)
- Children: Two daughters, six sons
- Education: Bryn Mawr College (1943)
- Occupation: Chemist

Mathilde B. "Mimi" Lee (May 1, 1920 – August 9, 2011) was an American chemist, athlete and philanthropist who served as the First Lady of Maryland from 1977 to 1979 when her husband, then Lt. Governor Blair Lee III, became acting governor following the departure of Governor Marvin Mandel.

== Biography ==
=== Early life ===
Lee was born Mathilde Boal on May 1, 1920, in Washington, D.C. She was named for her paternal grandmother, a distant relative of Christopher Columbus. Her mother, Jeanne de Menthon, a native of France, was a descendant of the 11th century French saint, Bernard of Menthon. Lee's father, Pierre de Lagarde Boal, was an American diplomat who served as the United States' ambassador to Nicaragua and Bolivia during the 1940s. Boal, who was fluent in English, French and Spanish, lived in ten countries by the time she completed college.

Boal graduated from Elmwood School, an exclusive all-girls school in Ottawa, Ontario, Canada, where her father was stationed for a diplomatic post. She obtained a bachelor's degree in chemistry in 1943, graduating cum laude from Bryn Mawr College in Bryn Mawr, Pennsylvania.

Boal took a job as a chemist with the Rockefeller Foundation in Colombia after graduating from Bryn Mawr College. She soon became engaged to Francis Preston Blair Lee III, a naval officer during World War II, whom she married in 1944. The two families, the Lees and the Boals, had previously been close friends even before the marriage. The couple had eight children.

=== First Lady of Maryland ===
Blair Lee III was sworn in as Lieutenant Governor of Maryland in 1971 and became acting Governor in 1977 when Governor Marvin Mandel was charged with racketeering and stepped down on an interim basis. As Maryland's First Lady, Lee took on an unusually independent approach from her predecessors. Lee did not move to the Government House in Annapolis instead choosing to live with her children full-time at their home and farm in Silver Spring, Maryland. When speaking to the Baltimore Sun upon taking office in 1978, Governor Lee said of his wife, "Where I go, she goes. At least that's what I keep telling myself anyway. She would rather be canoeing on the Potomac, backpacking along the Appalachian Trail or teaching children to swim than preparing for a formal party." One of Lee's predecessors, former First Lady Barbara Mandel, publicly offered to act as a "sort of senior adviser" to Lee explaining the need of First Ladies to engage in ceremonies, such as ribbon cuttings and garden tours.

Lee privately and publicly disliked much of the ceremonial roles of a traditional First Lady, like the ribbon cuttings, and the practice of politics, which she called "frivolous." Political columnist Frank DeFilippo, who served as press secretary for Governor Mandel, said of Lee, "I normally eschew the overused word 'unique,' but Mimi truly was. I've covered first ladies going back to Avalynne Tawes, and Mimi was the only one of the bunch who truly loathed life in the mansion, which, when forced to be there, she roamed in Sunny's Surplus fatigues with cargo pockets." Lee compared the formal role of First Lady, which she called "pomp," to social functions held at U.S. embassies when she was a girl. In a 1977 article, the Washington Post took note of the unusual outlook of the new First Lady, "She disdains luncheons and fashion shows except for her favorite causes — the Red Cross, water safety and Holy Cross Hospital among others. And while some other women from ordinary backgrounds would revel in the new status, Mimi Lee admits that sometimes it's inconvenient." The Washington Post also noted that she "answers her own phone, vacuums her house, cooks for her guests." In 1977, she told the Washington Post she wanted to "throw up" whenever her family was described as an "aristocracy."

While Lee limited her time in the state capitol, she partook in her state duties when necessary. Even in Annapolis, Lee preferred sneakers, jeans and work skirts to more formal attire. She once expressed irritation at the cancellation of a white water rafting trip on the Shenandoah River, but later told the Washington Post in the late 1970s that she had a "lovely" time hosting The Princess Anne. Lee focused much of her official time as First Lady on volunteer functions, such as the March of Dimes or the Red Cross. An accomplished athlete, Lee taught swimming classes for the handicapped while in office. She held an annual "Beer Bash" for Maryland Democrats at her farm in Silver Spring, often cooking for the guests.

Governor Blair Lee ran for a full term as governor in 1978, but was defeated in the Democratic gubernatorial primary by Harry Hughes. The Lees left office in January 1979, shortly before the end of his term, when Governor Mendel reclaimed his office for the two remaining days.

=== Later life ===
Her husband, Blair Lee, died in 1985. Lee devoted much of the rest of her life to athletic and philanthropic pursuits. Lee was an avid outdoor enthusiast throughout her life, pursuing skiing, canoeing, and camping. She became a practitioner of yoga during her tenure as First Lady and continued her athletic interests during her later life, becoming a competitive Senior athlete in swimming.

An accomplished Senior Olympian, Lee broke numerous national and Maryland swimming records while competing in the Senior Olympics during the 1990s. Lee also competed in the U.S. Masters Swimming Nationals, winning eight swimming competitions throughout the United States, and placed second in twenty other races. She hiked the Pyrenees between France and Spain with two of her seventeen-year-old grandchildren when she was seventy years old.

Outside of swimming, Lee learned German during her 80s.

Mimi Lee died of congestive heart failure at Laurel Regional Hospital in Laurel, Maryland, on August 9, 2011, at the age of 91. She was survived by seven of her eight children – Blair Lee IV, Joseph W. Lee, Christopher G. Lee, Erica B. Lee, Philip L. Lee, John F. Lee and Jenny Sataloff; her sister, Mary Elizabeth d'Harcourt; nineteen grandchildren and four great-grandchildren. Another son, Pierre B. Lee, died in 1973. Lee's funeral Mass was held at her parish, St. John the Baptist Catholic Church, in Silver Spring.
