= Frances Hughes Glendening =

First Lady of Maryland

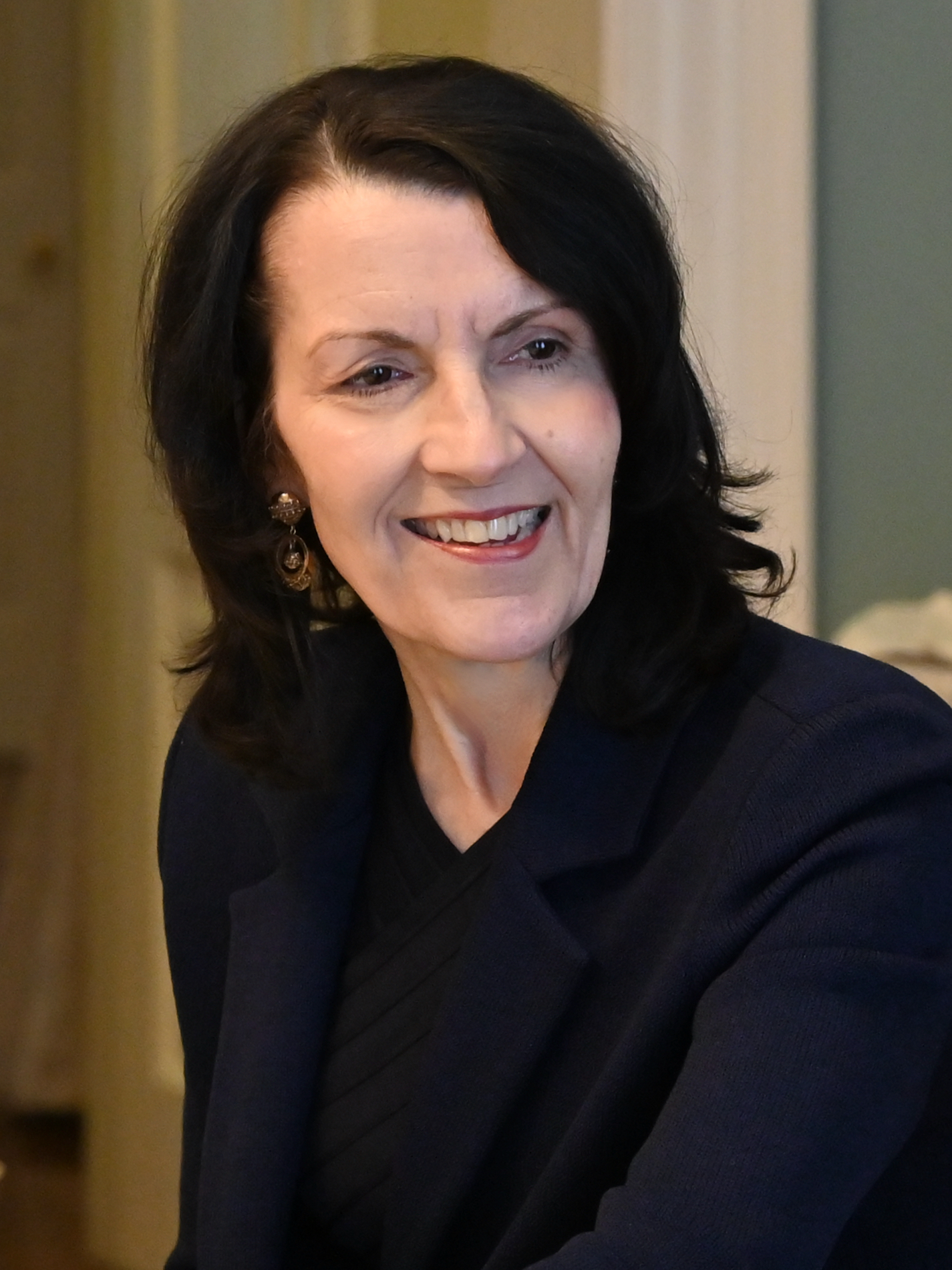
- Glendening in 2022

First Lady of Maryland
- In role January 18, 1995 – November 19, 2001
- Governor: Parris Glendening
- Preceded by: Patricia Donoho Hughes
- Succeeded by: Jennifer Crawford Glendening

Personal details
- Born: 1951 (age 74–75)
- Party: Democratic since 1996
- Other political affiliations: Republican until 1996
- Spouse: Parris Glendening (November 21, 1976 – November 19, 2001)
- Children: Raymond
- Parents: George R. Hughes, Jr. (Maryland state senator); (father); Patricia Hughes (mother)
- Education: Allegany High School (1969); University of Maryland, College Park (1974, 1977); Columbus School of Law (1986)
- Profession: FEC Legal and Policy Advisor (1985–2006); Chief Executive Officer of Jobs for America's Graduates—District of Columbia (since 2006)

Frances Anne Hughes ("Francie") Glendening (born 1951) is a former First Lady of Maryland. She was married to former Maryland Governor Parris Glendening, whom she divorced while he was governor after almost twenty-five years of marriage. The couple has a son, Raymond Glendening.

As first lady, Glendening promoted the history of the state's accomplished women, and opened Maryland's official gubernatorial home, Government House to the public. She wrote an introductory letter to Maryland Women Who Dare, a packet released in 2000 about women's accomplishments in Maryland.

Glendening's official portrait, painted by Aaron Shikler, was unveiled on June 24, 2004.

Honorary titles
Preceded by Patricia Donoho Hughes	First Lady of Maryland; January 18, 1995 – November 19, 2001	Succeeded by Jennifer Crawford Glendening
