= Elmwood School (Ottawa) =

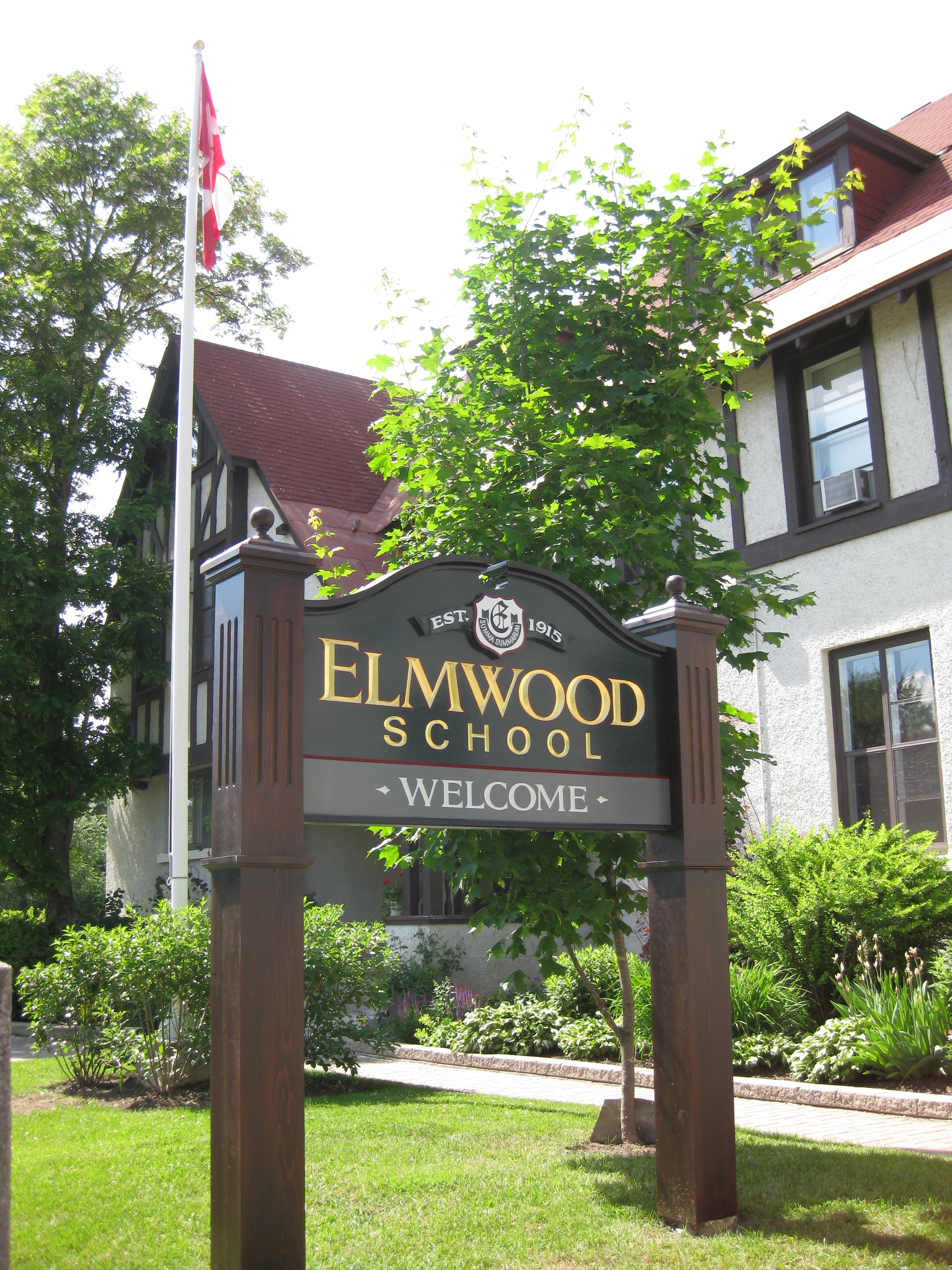

Location
- 261 Buena Vista Road; Ottawa, Ontario, K1M 0V9; Canada; 45°27′5″N 75°40′47″W

Information
- Motto: Summa Summarum (Highest of the High)
- Founded: 1915
- Headmaster: James Whitehouse
- Grades: JK - Grade 12
- Mascot: Squawk
- Team name: Eagles
- Website: www.elmwood.ca

Elmwood School is a private day school for girls located in Rockcliffe Park in the city of Ottawa, Ontario, Canada. It was founded in 1915 and is an International Baccalaureate World School. The school is also a member of the National Coalition of Girls' Schools and the Canadian Accredited Independent Schools.

The faculty provides education to 400 students aged 4 to 18. The current Head of School is James Whitehouse, who took over the leadership of the school in 2019 after seven years as Deputy Head of the Middle and Senior School. Prior to joining Elmwood, he served as Assistant Head at Seven Kings High School in Redbridge, London, United Kingdom.

Like many other private schools throughout the Commonwealth, Elmwood's traditions are based on similar schools in Britain. Senior formal leaders in their graduating year are called prefects, the students wear uniforms, and each student is a member of a house.

== Philosophy of education ==
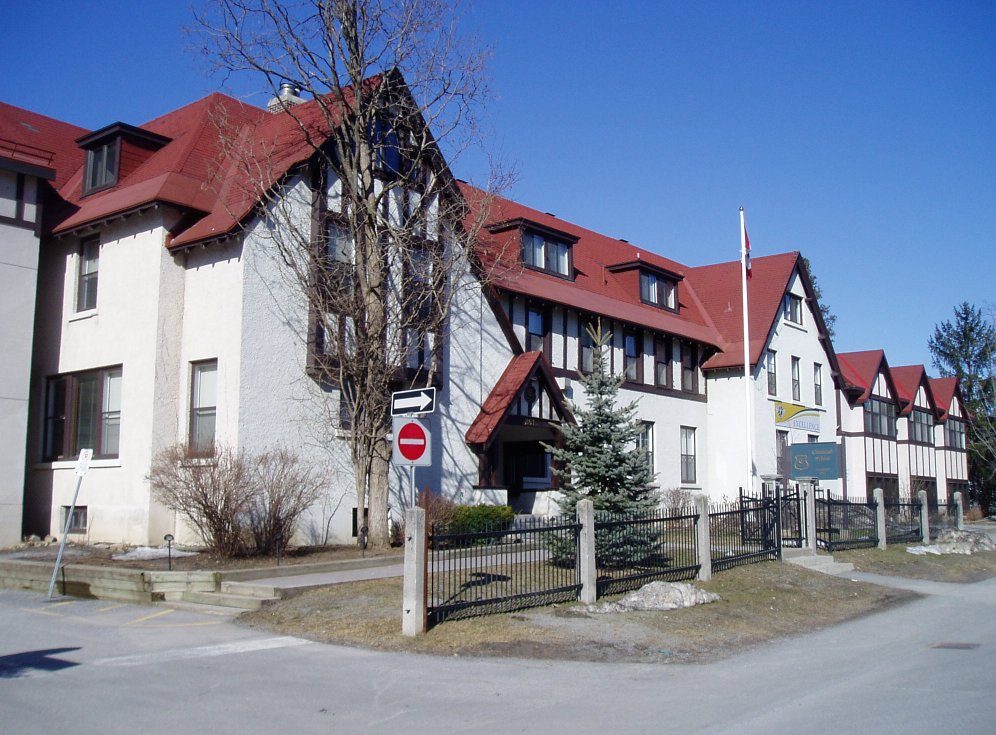
Elmwood School

Elmwood offers three International Baccalaureate programs: the PYP, MYP and DP.

== Facts and statistics ==
Over the past decade, Elmwood School has excelled in math and science. More than 50% of Elmwood's graduates go on to study math, science and engineering at university. This is significant considering that although women now account for a majority of undergraduate students at Canadian universities, female enrolment in engineering, math and science faculties has never exceeded 20%.

Elmwood's students represent more than 30 different nationalities. Roughly 20% of the student population are children of members of the diplomatic community.

=== Bilingual certification ===
Students who follow a prescribed sequence of courses and achieve fluency in both English and French are awarded a Bilingual Certificate. Elmwood also offers opportunities to study Spanish, Latin and Mandarin.

=== Technology ===
Elmwood School was one of the first schools in Canada to introduce a 1:1 laptop program in the Senior School. All students from Grades 9-12 and all faculty have their own personal laptop which they can use to enhance their learning. Additionally, many classrooms are equipped with a SMART Board and many students are accustomed to the use of technology. Students in the Junior and Middle Schools use computers in computer labs or utilize mobile laptop carts in the classroom.

=== Global connections ===
Elmwood is twinned with St. Charles High School; Seboche, Lesotho. This twinning is helped by the organization Help Lesotho. Alongside being twinned with a school in Africa, Elmwood has two sister schools. Calrossy Anglican School for Girls in Australia and Otago Girls' High School in New Zealand. It is not uncommon to have incoming and outgoing student exchanges.

== Athletics ==
Although Elmwood School is relatively small in size, it has an arguably diverse athletic program. Teams compete against other Ottawa area schools, both public and private and many teams perform at the highest level. In 2009 the Senior Girls Basketball team were the Ottawa Tier 1 'A' Champions. The grade 7/8 volleyball squad took gold at the Ottawa Independent Schools Athletic Association (OISAA) tournament as did the grade 7/8 soccer team. There is also a high participation rate in the athletics program, with occasionally over 70% of girls in Middle School represented the school on a team.

The Junior School has its own Athletics program geared towards the age of its students. Girls compete against other schools in various competitions including swimming and soccer. There is also a gymnastics and ballet program offered as a co-curricular activity

Sports offered in Middle and Senior School at Elmwood include, but are not limited to, the following:

- Alpine Ski
- Badminton
- Basketball
- Cross-country
- Field Hockey
- Golf
- Handball
- Rowing
- Rugby
- Soccer
- Snowboarding
- Swimming
- Tennis
- Touch football
- Track & Field
- Ultimate Frisbee
- Volleyball

== Duke of Edinburgh Award ==
Elmwood School offers a Duke of Edinburgh award programs in Canada to its students. The Duke of Edinburgh Award is non-competitive and available to all. It offers Bronze, Silver and Gold categories.

Elmwood School requires all grade 9 students to participate in the Bronze Award program. The vast majority of students go on to receive their Silver and Gold Awards. Elmwood School has the highest number of Gold Award recipients per capita in Ontario.

== History ==
Elmwood — originally the Rockcliffe Preparatory School — was founded in 1915 by Theodora Philpot, consisting of only four students, aged four to seven. Philpot was capable of hard work and, even as a respectable married woman with children, had plans that went far beyond her own front door. She was an entrepreneur, and her dream was to create a great school. Philpot's vision rang true with many parents. Even in the first few years, there were exponential increases in enrollment. Within ten years, Elmwood School had a student population of eighty students, served by a faculty of twelve teachers.

After founding the school, Theodora Philpot retired to England leaving Elmwood in the hands of Edith Buck. She donated a Bible Box, inscribed with the words "Pactum Serva" meaning "Keep the Faith" to the school, and it came with a plea to carry on the work she had started.

=== School symbol ===
The daffodil is the symbol of Elmwood School. Inspired by a poem by William Wordsworth, I Wandered Lonely as a Cloud also known as Daffodils, the founding Headmistress, Theodora Philpot, adopted it for the Philpot Token Award. Each year, the student who embodies the spirit and ideals of service, fellowship, freedom and fair play is presented with this award.

=== School hymn ===
The school hymn is a modified version of To be a Pilgrim by John Bunyan.

=== Elmwood Centennial 1915–2015 ===
The Elmwood School's centennial celebrations (1915–2015) consisted of a Centennial 'Kick Off' celebration on the first day of school (Sept 9, 2015), a Founder's Day celebration (Oct 2, 3, and 4, 2015), a Homecoming weekend for alumnae and current members of our community (Oct 2, 3, and 4, 2015) as well as a Centennial Finale after closing ceremonies on June 17, 2016. In addition, Elmwood held a special Centennial Gala (April 16, 2016) as well as a special Centennial Holly Tea and a Centennial Father Daughter Dinner Dance (Feb 6, 2016). A photographic exhibition was positioned around the school permanently. The Elmwood School history book, 'Voices,' previously written for our 85th anniversary, was updated to include events 2000–2015. The yearbooks were digitized and the oldest yearbooks were preserved.

=== Elmwood coat of arms ===
The centennial committee worked with the Chief Herald at the Governor General's office to create an Elmwood Coat of Arms. Her Excellency Sharon Johnston unveiled the coat of arms of Elmwood School, on Thursday, May 7, 2015, at 9:15 a.m., at Elmwood School. The symbol represents Elmwood's proud tradition as well as looks forward to its future. "This year, Elmwood is celebrating its centennial. I'm delighted to take part in the celebrations by unveiling a very important symbol that speaks to the school's rich history, values and traditions," said Her Excellency.

=== Notable alumnae ===
Many Elmwood students have gone on to have remarkable careers and successful lives. Canada's first female Senator, Cairine Wilson, attended the school and was Head Girl in her final year. The school's Wilson House is named in her honour. Canadian television broadcaster Catherine Clark, daughter of the Right Honourable Joe Clark, also attended Elmwood. Gemini Award-winning Canadian screenwriter Tassie Cameron spent her formative years at Elmwood and was a writer and co-executive producer on the hit CBS/CTV television series Rookie Blue. Tassie and her sister Amy created the 2009 CBC television series Wild Roses. Mimi Lee, an American chemist, served as First Lady of Maryland from 1977 to 1979.

Over the years, Elmwood has admitted boys in its early years program, many of which attend Ashbury College in high school. Actor Hume Cronyn, Adrian Harewood (host of Ottawa's afternoon program All In A Day), and entrepreneur Ben Barry are all examples of such 'Old Boys' of Elmwood.

== Traditions ==
There are many strong traditions that have been upheld at Elmwood over the years. One of the most striking traditions is the practice of the Grade 12 graduates wearing white dresses to their Closing (Graduation) Ceremony rather than the black caps and gowns found at other schools. The graduates traditionally have their photograph taken on the staircase in the Front Hall, the oldest part of the school.

The Rose Ceremony is a more recent graduate tradition. Each year a girl in Grade 12 is given a rose by a student in Grade 11. At this time, the graduate's accomplishments and contributions to the school are celebrated through a short testimonial given by a Grade 11 student. If the graduate has a sister in a younger grade, the sister is permitted to make the presentation.

Another tradition which has existed for over 20 years is the annual Father Daughter Dinner Dance. This formal event takes place in February and gives Elmwood fathers and their daughters in Grades 6-12 an opportunity to socialize with each other and celebrate the bond between father and daughter. More recently a Mother Daughter weekend has also been added to the social calendar as well as a Junior School Tea for Elmwood's youngest students.

== House system ==
Elmwood students are divided into four Houses, each named after a prominent and inspirational woman in history: Elizabeth Fry, Helen Keller, Florence Nightingale and Cairine Wilson.

=== Fry ===
- Bio: Elizabeth Fry (1740–1845) is remembered for her pioneering work in prison reform in Britain. She was chosen by the students in 1927 "because of the great work she did among the poor and unfortunate and in the prisons... In this house the aim is to follow her example of love to all humanity and to try to have some of her courage and determination to do the right thing."
- Motto: Societas Huamana – Friendship for All
- Pin: circle, with a red letter "F" on a white background
- Symbol: Gold star
- Colour: Red and Gold
- Charity: Humane Society

=== Keller ===
- Bio: After a childhood illness, Helen Keller (1880–1968) became both deaf and blind. Despite her handicap, she made phenomenal progress learning to communicate with the outside world. Her determination and success paved the way for other handicapped people to find hope and help in their struggle to achieve success as well.
- Motto: Fair Play
- Pin: Circle with a light blue letter "K" on a white background
- Symbol: Paw print
- Colour: Light blue and White
- Charity: Canadian Guide Dogs for the Blind

=== Nightingale ===
- Bio: Florence Nightingale (1820–1910) was well schooled having studied Greek, Latin, French, German, and Italian, history, philosophy and mathematics. In adulthood she became a nurse and is best known for her struggle to improve the quality of nursing care of the sick and wounded soldiers during the Crimean War.
- Motto: Non Nobis Solum – Not for Ourselves Alone
- Pin: circle, with a navy blue letter "N" on a white background
- Symbol: Anchor
- Colour: Navy blue and Silver
- Charity: Make A Wish Foundation

=== Wilson ===
- Bio: Cairine Wilson (1885–1962) was named Canada's first woman senator on February 20, 1930. A leader in Women's Liberal clubs and youth groups, President of the Canadian League of Nations Society, Chair of the Canadian National Committee on Refugees and a delegate to the United Nations.
- Motto: To Give Ourselves and Never Count the Cost for Others' Greater Need
- Pin: Circle with a yellow "W" on a white background
- Symbol: The Sun
- Colour: Purple and Yellow
- Charity: Boys & Girls Clubs of Canada

Each student is placed in a House upon entering the school and stays in that house until graduation.

House meetings are held regularly during assembly period. House games are held during the lunch hour. The Spirit Afternoon in the fall and Sports Day in the spring are structured around House teams. Attendance at all House activities is compulsory.

Houses also choose a program of social service each year and are responsible for designing and carrying out fund-raising activities.

=== Arms ===
Coat of arms of Elmwood School

Notes
Granted 20 March 2015.
Crest
Issuant from a circlet of mullets Or a female monarch butterfly Vert embellished Or.
Escutcheon
Per saltire Or and Vert four elm leaves their stems inward counterchanged.
Supporters
Two little owls (Athene noctua) Or standing on a rocky mount set with daffodils and trillium flowers Proper above barry wavy Or and Vert.
Motto
Summa Summarum
