= 1978 Maryland gubernatorial election =

- November 7, 1978
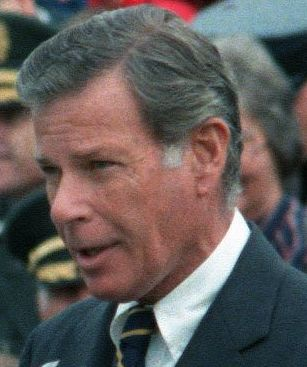

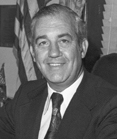
Nominee	Harry Hughes	John Glenn Beall Jr.
Party	Democratic	Republican
Running mate	Samuel Bogley	Aris T. Allen
Popular vote	705,910	293,635
Percentage	70.62%	29.38%
- County results Hughes: 50–60% 60–70% 70–80% 80–90% Beall: 50–60% 60–70%
Governor before election
Marvin Mandel
Democratic
Elected Governor
Harry Hughes
Democratic

The 1978 Maryland gubernatorial election was held on November 7, 1978. Democratic nominee Harry Hughes defeated Republican nominee John Glenn Beall Jr. with 70.62% of the vote.

== Primary elections ==
Primary elections were held on September 12, 1978.

=== Democratic primary ===
==== Candidates ====
- Harry Hughes, former State Senator
- Blair Lee III, incumbent Lieutenant Governor
- Ted Venetoulis, County Executive of Baltimore County
- Walter S. Orlinsky, President of the Baltimore City Council

==== Results ====
Democratic primary results
Party	Candidate	Votes	%
Democratic	Harry Hughes	213,457	37.23
Democratic	Blair Lee III	194,236	33.88
Democratic	Ted Venetoulis	140,486	24.50
Democratic	Walter S. Orlinsky	25,200	4.40
Total votes		573,379	100.00

=== Republican primary ===
==== Candidates ====
- John Glenn Beall Jr., former United States Senator
- Carlton Beall, former Postmaster General of Washington, D.C.
- Louise Gore, former State Senator
- Ross Zimmerman Pierpont, perennial candidate

==== Results ====
Republican primary results
Party	Candidate	Votes	%
Republican	John Glenn Beall Jr.	76,011	57.69
Republican	Carlton Beall	30,119	22.86
Republican	Louise Gore	20,690	15.70
Republican	Ross Zimmerman Pierpont	4,940	3.75
Total votes		131,760	100.00

== General election ==
=== Candidates ===
- Harry Hughes, Democratic
- John Glenn Beall Jr., Republican

=== Results ===
1978 Maryland gubernatorial election
Party	Candidate	Votes	%	±%
Democratic	Harry Hughes	705,910	70.62%	
Republican	John Glenn Beall Jr.	293,635	29.38%	
Majority		424,693		
Turnout		1,011,963		
Democratic hold		Swing		
