= John Dorsey (American football) =

American football player and executive (born 1960)

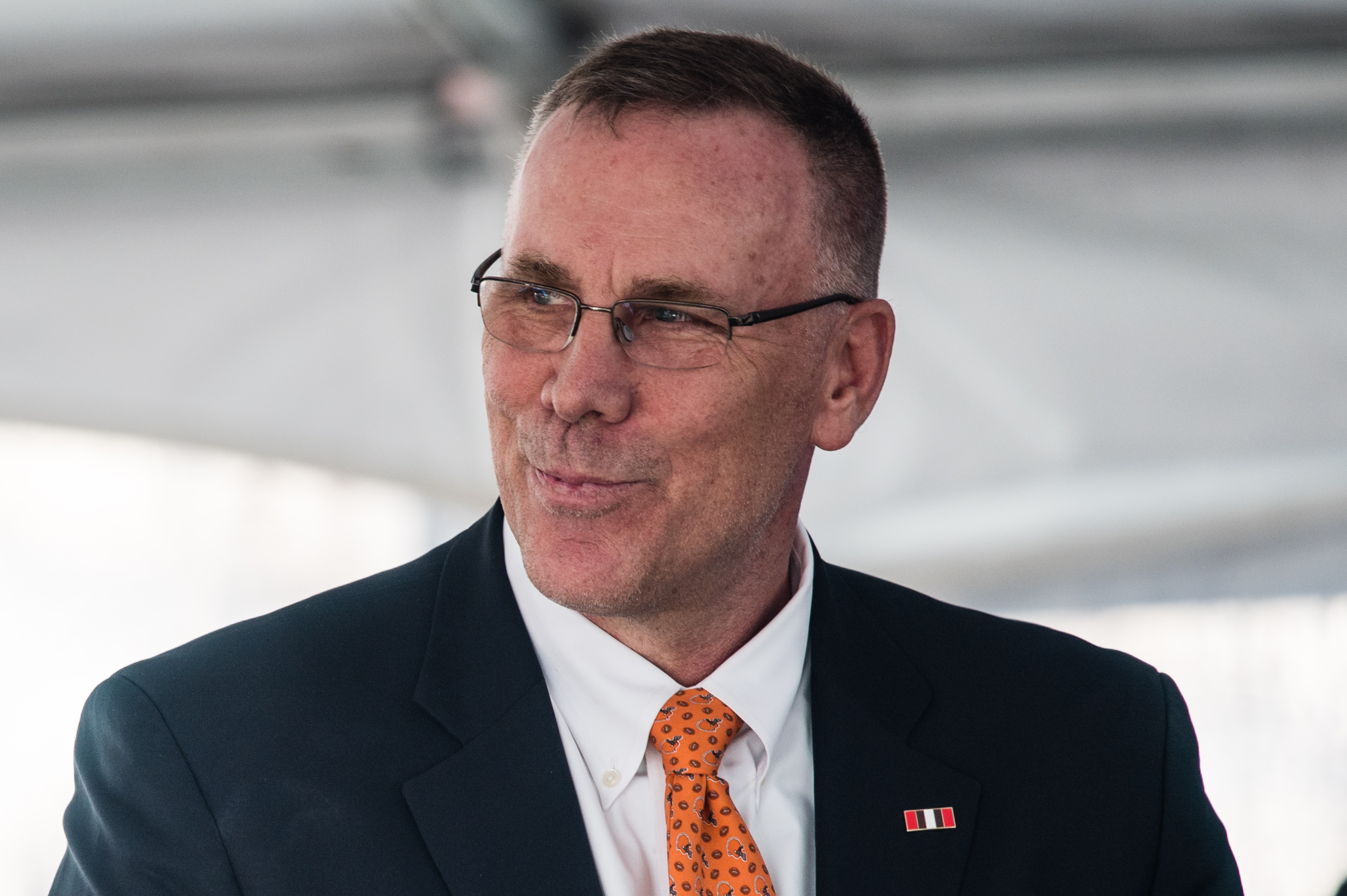
- Dorsey in 2019

Detroit Lions
- Title: Senior personnel executive

Personal information
- Born: August 30, 1960 (age 66); Leonardtown, Maryland, U.S.
- Listed height: 6 ft 2 in (1.88 m)
- Listed weight: 240 lb (109 kg)

Career information
- Position: Linebacker (No. 99)
- High school: Fork Union Military Academy (VA)
- College: Connecticut
- NFL draft: 1984: 4th round, 99th overall pick

Career history

Playing
- Green Bay Packers (1984–1989)

Operations
- Green Bay Packers (1991–1998); Scout (1991–1996); Director of college scouting (1997–1998); Seattle Seahawks (1999) Director of player personnel; Green Bay Packers (2000–2012); Director of college scouting (2000–2011); Director of football operations (2012); Kansas City Chiefs (2013–2017) General manager; Cleveland Browns (2017–2019) General manager; Philadelphia Eagles (2020) Front office consultant; Detroit Lions (2021–present) Senior personnel executive

Awards and highlights
- As an executive: 2× Super Bowl champion (XXXI, XLV)
- Stats at Pro Football Reference
- Executive profile at Pro Football Reference

John Michael Dorsey (born August 30, 1960) is an American professional football executive and former player who is a senior personnel executive for the Detroit Lions of the National Football League (NFL). He previously served as general manager of the Cleveland Browns and Kansas City Chiefs. He is a former National Football League player for the Green Bay Packers, and later served in the Packers' scouting department for more than two decades, including director of college scouting from 2000 to 2011. He served as the Seattle Seahawks' director of player personnel in 1999, between two stints in Green Bay's front office.

== College career ==
Dorsey was a four-year starter at linebacker for the University of Connecticut Huskies, being twice named Yankee Conference Defensive Player of the Year as well as an NCAA Division I-AA All-American honors.

== Professional career ==
Dorsey was a fourth-round pick by the Green Bay Packers in the 1984 NFL draft. He was also seventh-round draft pick by the USFL's Philadelphia Stars in the 1984 USFL draft. He played five seasons for Green Bay at linebacker and on special teams. His thirty-five special teams tackles for the Packers in 1984 is still a team record.

Dorsey spent the 1989 season on the injured reserve list after suffering a knee injury during pre-game warmups of the Packers regular season opener, effectively ending his playing days. He totaled 130 tackles and two fumble recoveries during his five-year career.

== Administrative career ==
=== Green Bay Packers (first stint) ===
After his playing career ended, Dorsey chose to remain in football, taking a job as a college scout for the Packers in May 1991. He was later promoted to director of college scouting for the team in February 1997.

=== Seattle Seahawks ===
In January 1999, Dorsey followed former Packers coach Mike Holmgren to the Seattle Seahawks, assuming the role of the team's director of player personnel. He resigned in 2000.

=== Green Bay Packers (second stint) ===
In 2000, Dorsey returned to the Packers, taking over again as director of college scouting. He remained in that position through 2011, and winning a Super Bowl ring. In 2012, he was named director of football operations. He is credited with making the Packers one of the best drafting teams in the NFL, helping choose star players like Aaron Rodgers, Clay Matthews and Greg Jennings.

=== Kansas City Chiefs ===
On January 13, 2013, Dorsey became the general manager of the Kansas City Chiefs. The move reunited Dorsey with new Chiefs head coach Andy Reid. The pair served on the Green Bay Packers coaching staff together from 1992 to 1997. It had previously been announced that Reid would have the final say in football matters when he came over from Philadelphia, but the Chiefs then announced that Dorsey would have the same authority over personnel as other NFL general managers. However, Dorsey and Reid reported on an equal basis to chairman and CEO Clark Hunt, unlike past years in which the coach reported to the general manager.

While with Kansas City, Dorsey made the decision to trade up to draft Patrick Mahomes with the tenth selection in the 2017 NFL draft. This pick was criticized, as many commentators believed that Deshaun Watson was the better pick. Dorsey stood by the decision, saying about Mahomes "these types of guys don't come around that often.... I believe in his skillset, and what he's going to develop into." Mahomes would later help the Chiefs to three Super Bowl championships in five seasons.

On June 22, 2017, the Chiefs organization and Dorsey agreed to part ways, after posting a 43–21 record and three trips to the postseason in his four seasons as GM for the Chiefs. Shortly before leaving the Chiefs, former Chiefs wide receiver Jeremy Maclin said that Dorsey informed him of his release on a voicemail, which drew criticism from Maclin himself and the media.

=== Cleveland Browns ===
On December 7, 2017, Dorsey became the general manager of the Cleveland Browns, hours after Sashi Brown was relieved of his duties; a press conference announcing Dorsey's hiring was held the following day with team owner Jimmy Haslam. Dorsey drafted quarterback Baker Mayfield (Oklahoma) with the 1st overall selection in the 2018 NFL draft, followed by cornerback Denzel Ward (Ohio State) with the 2018 4th overall selection, then running back Nick Chubb (Georgia) in the 2nd round, wide receiver Antonio Callaway (Florida) in the 4th round, and others. Dorsey also traded for star wide receiver Jarvis Landry, previously a member of the Miami Dolphins. After finishing 7-8-1 in the 2018 season and missing the playoffs, Dorsey went on to trade for star wide receiver Odell Beckham Jr. (previously a teammate of Landry's at LSU), as well as acquiring other assets via trade and the draft (cornerback Greedy Williams, running back Kareem Hunt, defensive tackle Sheldon Richardson, and defensive end Olivier Vernon).

On December 31, 2019, the Browns announced the departure of Dorsey.

=== Detroit Lions ===
After consulting for the Philadelphia Eagles in 2020, Dorsey was hired by the Detroit Lions as a senior personnel executive on January 27, 2021.

== Personal life ==
Dorsey is a son of former Maryland state senator Walter B. Dorsey and Jeanne Dorsey Mandel, who remarried in 1974 to Maryland Governor Marvin Mandel.

Dorsey attended and graduated from St. Mary's High School in Annapolis. He earned bachelor's degrees in Political Science and Economics from the University of Connecticut.

Dorsey has two adult sons from his first marriage and has a son and daughter with his current wife, Patricia. The couple first met in Kansas City while Dorsey was on a scouting trip for the Packers. After several years of dating, they were married in 2005.

Dorsey has competed in multiple marathon races and is an avid water skier.

== Honors ==
- 1987 – Green Bay Packers "Man of the Year" for civic contributions
- 1998 – Selected to the University of Connecticut 100th Anniversary All-Time Football Team
- 2002 – Inducted into the Anne Arundel County, Maryland Sports Hall of Fame
- 2016 – Inducted into Fork Union Military Academy Sports Hall of Fame
