= Garr Auditorium =

Pentecostal church in Charlotte, North Carolina

Coordinates: 35°10′9″N 80°44′45″W

Garr Auditorium, also previously identified by the names Cannon Cathedral, Wesley Heights Church, or Garr Church, is a Pentecostal church in Charlotte, North Carolina founded by Alfred Goodrich Garr and his wife Lillian. They founded the church in 1930 and officially moved into the building they constructed in 1933, where the church stood for 80 years until 2010. The church was relocated after Hurricane Hugo in 1989, and operated at 7700 Wallace Rd in Charlotte, North Carolina. The building was destroyed in the early 2010s, and has since been replaced by a parking lot for a dealership.

== Founder ==
Alfred Goodrich Garr was born in 1874 in Danville, Kentucky to Oliver and Josephine Garr. He was the fifth and youngest child by 12 years, and particularly doted on by his older siblings and mother. From a young age, Alfred expressed a "spiritual hunger" and at age 7 he repented of his sin and began searching for God in his life, followed by baptism in the local Baptist church.

Alfred Goodrich Garr met Lillian Anderson when they were in school at Ashbury College. They married and entered the ministry through the Methodist Church, and moved to California so Alfred could pastor an independent church, the Burning Bush Mission. It was at this time that the Azusa Street Revival broke out in Los Angeles, California. The Holy Spirit was outpoured upon Los Angeles and the community that had gathered there, and Alfred Garr was the first white pastor to receive baptism by the Holy Spirit on June 16, 1906.

A week after receiving the Holy Spirit, Garr was called to go to India and spread the message of Azusa Street, and then two weeks later he departed. Both he and his wife believed they had been gifted with the gift of speaking in languages that would aid their Indian outreach. Alfred believed he had the gift of speaking Bengali and Lillian thought she had Mandarin and Tibetan. However, when they arrived in India they attempted to preach in these languages but could not. They abandoned the gift of tongues to try and speak to the native peoples, but Alfred still practiced it as evidence of the Spirit baptism.

== Foundation of the Church ==
After returning from India, the Garr's traveled briefly around the United States until they settled in Charlotte, North Carolina in 1930. They began a tent revival and began to preach, with the meetings starting on Mother's Day. After a miraculous healing, people began swarming to the tent and popularity increased dramatically. As the numbers grew, Garr looked for a larger location, purchasing lumber from the Charlotte Speedway to construct a tabernacle to seat several thousand people.

The worship continued for several months in the tabernacle, until Garr bought Charlotte Civic Auditorium in the midst of the Great Depression. Construction to rebuild the new church took until June 18, 1933 when the auditorium was officially opened. Garr Auditorium quickly became the largest Pentecostal Church in the Eastern United States. Alfred Garr died on July 23, 1944, but Garr Auditorium was kept running by his wife Lillian, and still continues to hold services today.

== Beliefs ==
The Garr Church's website provides a comprehensive statement of the church's beliefs and teachings. There are 7 main points of doctrine: the Bible is the word of God, the one true God is three in one, salvation is found only in Jesus Christ, the Holy Spirit empowers us to live out our faith, we are the church with a mission, the second coming of Christ & final judgement, and human sexuality.

The Church's mission statement, as copied from their website, is:

"To lead others into a growing relationship with Jesus Christ by providing and environment where they feel loved, valued and connected."

== Jesus Saves Sign ==
The original Garr Auditorium had a sign that said "Jesus Saves", constructed out of big white letters and mounted on top of the church. The sign was originally mounted on top of the church so planes passing over could see it. The sign became a local landmark, and even after the congregation was moved in 1989 after Hurricane Hugo, the sign still remained atop the original Garr Auditorium. In 2010, crews removed the sign from the decaying building.
