= Robert A. Pascal =

American politician (1934–2021)

2nd County Executive of Anne Arundel County
- In office 1974–1982
- Preceded by: Joseph W. Alton
- Succeeded by: O. James Lighthizer

Member of the Maryland Senate from the 6B district
- In office 1971–1974
- Preceded by: John W. Steffey (R)
- Succeeded by: Nancy Pascal (R)

Personal details
- Born: July 20, 1934 Glen Ridge, New Jersey, U.S.
- Died: March 12, 2021 (aged 86)
- Party: Republican
- Spouse: Married
- Children: Four daughters
- Education: Duke University, B.A.(economics), 1957
- Football career

Profile
- Position: Halfback

Personal information
- Listed height: 5 ft 11 in (1.80 m)
- Listed weight: 183 lb (83 kg)

Career history
- 1956: Montreal Alouettes

Awards and highlights
- Third-team All-American (1954); First-team All-ACC (1954)

Robert A. Pascal (July 20, 1934 – March 12, 2021) was an American Republican politician, collegiate football player, professional Canadian football player and a propane entrepreneur who served as County Executive of Anne Arundel County, Maryland from 1975 to 1982.

== Early life ==
Pascal was born in Glen Ridge, New Jersey. He was raised in Bloomfield, New Jersey, where his father worked in the local school district, and he attended Bloomfield High School. He played football at Duke University. During this time, Pascal earned first team All-American as a halfback in 1955. He led the Duke Blue Devils in rushing for two seasons, and was named team MVP in 1955. He was also a two time first team All-ACC selection. After graduating from Duke in 1956, Pascal was drafted in the third round by the Baltimore Colts. Pascal instead decided to play in the Canadian Football League for the Montreal Alouettes. During his one season in the league, he played for the Grey Cup.

== Career ==
After playing in the Canadian Football League, Pascal then moved back to the United States and entered the propane business. He eventually bought his own company, United Propane, and built it into one of the top 25 in the country. Pascal sold the company to Inergy, L.P. in 2003. Pascal also entered politics.

Pascal was a State Senator from 1971 to 1974. From 1974 to 1982 he served as the Anne Arundel County Executive and was key to the creation of Kinder Farm Park, which he had the county buy from the Kinder family.

Pascal was the Republican nominee for Governor of Maryland in 1982, losing to incumbent Harry R. Hughes. Pascal served as the Secretary of Appointments to Governor William Donald Schaefer from 1989 to 1995.

== Legacy ==
The following have been named after Bob Pascal:

- Pascal Field House, Duke University, Durham, North Carolina
- Pascal Senior Center, Glen Burnie, Maryland — Anne Arundel County's first senior center
- Pascal Center for the Performing Arts, Anne Arundel Community College, Arnold, Maryland
- Pascal Field, St. Mary's High School, Annapolis, Maryland
- Robert A. Pascal Youth & Family Services, Inc., Odenton, Maryland

== Philanthropy ==
Pascal donated $6 million to Duke University to help fund the construction of an indoor practice facility for the Duke football team. The facility was later named the Pascal Field House in his honor.

== Personal life ==
Pascal had four daughters, Catherine Anne, Margaret, Clara, and Robin.

Political offices
Preceded by Joseph W. Alton	Anne Arundel County Executive; 1974–1982	Succeeded by O. James Lighthizer
Party political offices
Preceded by J. Glenn Beall Jr.	Republican nominee for Governor of Maryland; 1982	Succeeded by Thomas J. Mooney
