= Pierre de Lagarde Boal =

American diplomat and aviator

Pierre de Lagarde Boal (September 29, 1895, Thonon-les-Bains, Haute-Savoie, France – May 24, 1966, Neuilly-sur-Seine, France) was an American diplomat and aviator. Boal served as the United States Ambassador to Nicaragua from 1941 to 1942 and the United States Ambassador to Bolivia from May 1942 to February 5, 1944.

== Biography ==
He was born Pierre Denis de Lagarde Boal on September 29, 1895, at Thonon-les-Bains, Haute-Savoie, France, to Theodore Davis Boal and his wife, Mathilde Marie Dolorès Denis de Lagarde. In 1925 his father was a lieutenant colonel in the 28th Infantry Division, a unit in the Army National Guard and the oldest division-sized unit in the United States armed forces.

Boal's French wife, Jeanne de Menthon, was a descendant of Bernard of Menthon, an 11th-century saint. Their children included Mimi Lee, who served as the First Lady of Maryland from 1977 to 1979.

Boal joined the Foreign Service in 1919. Before his appointment as ambassador, he served tours as diplomatic secretary of counselor of embassy in Mexico City, Belgrade, Warsaw, Bern, Lima, and Ottawa. Boal was also the one time Chief of the Western European Division.

He died at 3 p.m. of a "cerebral vascular accident" on May 24, 1966, at the American hospital on 63 Victor Hugo Boulevard, Neuilly-sur-Seine, France. After his death, his body was released to his wife Jeanne and transported from the Paris Orly Airport to Kennedy International Airport on its way to Boalsburg, Pennsylvania, for interment.

Diplomatic posts
Preceded by post created	United States Ambassador to Bolivia; 1942–1944	Succeeded by Walter C. Thurston
