= A. Gordon Boone =

American politician

Member of the Maryland House of Delegates
- In office 1947–1964

Speaker of the Maryland House of Delegates
- In office 1963–1963
- Preceded by: Perry O. Wilkinson
- Succeeded by: Marvin Mandel

Personal details
- Born: December 2, 1910 Baltimore County, Maryland, U.S.
- Died: October 14, 1988 (aged 77) Swan's Island, Maine, U.S.
- Party: Democratic
- Education: Johns Hopkins University; University of Baltimore

A. Gordon Boone (December 2, 1910 – October 14, 1988) was an American politician. He served as a Democratic member of the Maryland House of Delegates.

== Life and career ==
Boone was born in Baltimore County, Maryland. He attended Johns Hopkins University and the University of Baltimore.

Boone served in the Maryland House of Delegates from 1947 to 1964.

Boone died on October 14, 1988 at his home in Swan's Island, Maine, at the age of 77.
