= Ann Hull =

American politician

Ann Remington Hull (February 24, 1925 – October 30, 2003) served as a member of the Maryland House of Delegates for twelve years. She also involved herself in other areas of politics including the Vice President of Maryland's chapter of the League of Women Voters and the executive assistant to Governor Harry Hughes. During her career, Hull was involved on issues of education, civil rights, health and mental health, childcare, and other political and social issues.

== Early life and education ==
Hull was born in Seattle, Washington. She attended public schools in Seattle.

Hull attended the University of Washington and graduated with a Bachelors of Arts in geography in 1945. She was also elected into the Phi Beta Kappa society because of her undergraduate academics. She then attended Syracuse University for her master's degree in geography, graduating in 1948.

== Career ==
Hull moved to the Washington, D.C. area in 1948. She worked as a geographer for the federal government until 1954.

Raising her children in Takoma Park, Maryland, Hull involved herself in the local chapter of the League of Women Voters. In 1962, Hull was elected as the president of the Prince George's County league. She served in this position until 1965. From 1965 to 1966, she served as the vice president for the Maryland state league.

In 1966, she was elected to the Maryland House of Delegates, representing the second district of Prince George's County. She started her term in 1967 and served three terms, ending in 1979. She was a member of the Democratic Party. In the 1975-1976 legislative session, Hull served as Speaker pro Tempore.

During her terms as a state delegate, Hull advocated for children in the foster care system, groups homes and residential facilities, for child care, juvenile courts, education, among others. Hull was also on several committees and commissions, including member of the Board of Directors of Maryland Community Coordinated Child Care (1971), vice-chair of Prince George's Delegation (1971-1974), member of Governor's Task Force on Financing Education (1972) and others.

Hull did not run an election campaign for a fourth term. She had been hopeful that she could be appointed to fill a seat in the state Senate but was not chosen for the position.

Hull worked as the executive assistant to Governor Harry Hughes from 1979 to 1985. During her time there, Hull's work was focused on issues of health and mental health. From 1985 until 1988, she was the chair of the Governor's Commission to Revise the Mental Retardation and Developmental Disabilities Laws. She also worked as a member of the Transportation Research Board of the National Academy of Sciences.

From August 1983 until June 1988, Hull was vice chair of the Board of Trustees of State Universities and Colleges. She then served as a member and vice chair of the Board of Regents of the University of Maryland System from 1989 to 1997.

== Awards and recognitions ==
Hull received the Distinguished Citizen Award from Maryland Action for Foster Children in 1974. In 1975, Hull became the first woman legislator from Maryland to donate her papers to the University of Maryland’s Special Collections and University Archives.

Hull was a member of the American Association of Geographers.

== Personal life ==
Hull met Gordon C. Hull during her graduate program, and they married in 1948. Together they had two children.

Hull died in Chestertown, Maryland due to complications due to her Parkinson's disease.

== Written works ==
- Maryland., Hull, A. R., & Maryland. (1977). Report of the Task Force on Collective Bargaining for Public Employees, General Assembly of the State of Maryland, Annapolis, Maryland, October, 1977. Annapolis, Md: The Task Force. OCLC 11439223
- Maryland., & Hull, A. R. (1985). Report of the Governor's Commission to Revise the Mental Retardation and Developmental Disabilities Law. Annapolis, Md.: The commission. OCLC 13119434
