= Jeanne Dorsey Mandel =

2nd wife of Maryland Governor Marvin Mandel

First Lady of Maryland
- In role August 13, 1974 – June 4, 1977
- Governor: Marvin Mandel
- Preceded by: Barbara Oberfeld Mandel
- Succeeded by: Mimi Lee (acting)
- In role January 15, 1979 – January 17, 1979
- Preceded by: Mimi Lee
- Succeeded by: Patricia Donoho Hughes

Personal details
- Born: Jeanne Blackistone; May 11, 1937 Leonardtown, Maryland, U.S.
- Died: October 6, 2001 (aged 64) Annapolis, Maryland, U.S.
- Spouse(s): Walter B. Dorsey (m. 1955 – 1969 div.), Marvin Mandel (m. August 13, 1974)
- Relations: Nehemiah Blakiston (Governor of Maryland colony, 1690–1692, Nathaniel Blakiston (royal governor of Maryland colony, 1698–1702), John Blakiston (c. 1603–1649, a regicide of King Charles I of England), William J. Blakistone (Speaker of the Maryland House of Delegates, 1834 and 1847)
- Children: Philip, Helen, John, and Paul (all during her first marriage)
- Education: Strayer College
- Profession: Politician

Jeanne Blackistone Dorsey Mandel (May 11, 1937 – October 6, 2001) was a First Lady of Maryland and second wife of former Maryland Governor Marvin Mandel, whom she had met in January 1963. She was a native of Leonardtown, St. Mary's County, Maryland. She died from amyotrophic lateral sclerosis (ALS, also known as Lou Gehrig's disease).

Jeanne Blackistone Dorsey was elected as one of Leonardtown's town commissioners in 1968, the first woman elected to public office in St. Mary's County. She served two consecutive two-year terms in that office while holding the position of Leonardtown's first female police commissioner. She also served for two years as vice-chair of the Southern Maryland Municipal League and as a member of the Board of Parks and Recreation of St. Mary's County.

Her son, John Dorsey, is a former general manager of the Kansas City Chiefs and Cleveland Browns.

Honorary titles
Preceded by Barbara Oberfeld Mandel	First Lady of Maryland; August 13, 1974 – January 17, 1979	Succeeded by Patricia Donoho Hughes
