= Alfred Goodrich Garr =

Alfred Gaelton Garr (July 27, 1875 – July 23, 1944) was an early leader in the Pentecostal movement. Hundreds of churches were born out of his ministry, and he was a pioneer in the healing ministry of Pentecostalism as a whole, leading hundreds of healings during his lifetime. He became a leader in the Burning Bush movement before attending the Azusa Street Revival and subsequently devoting the rest of his life to healing evangelism and planting Pentecostal churches in the nation and across the globe.

== Early life ==
Garr was born in Danville, Kentucky, on July 27, 1875, the youngest child in his family by 12 years. He was baptized at age seven at a local Baptist church, after having a conviction of sin. He continued to feel distant from God, however, as he did not have the real experience with God that he had expected post-baptism. He remained hungry for spiritual encounters in his young age, even traveling to Charleston, Virginia, for a Presbyterian Church meeting. As a teen, he struggled with his relationship with churches and God, and began using tobacco.

While in Kentucky for business, Garr met a preacher from the Holiness movement. Garr believed the preacher's conviction that he was free of sin, and felt inspired by that notion. After this meeting, Garr said he felt the call of God to preach, but resisted that call initially.

Garr later enrolled in Asbury College in Wilmore, Kentucky, in the fall of 1898 to study ministry. Shortly thereafter, he married his wife, Lillian Anderson, on March 12, 1899, and withdrew from Asbury College. They both became ordained with the Methodist Church and the International Apostolic Prayer Union, led by Martin Wells Knapp.

== Career ==
Through Knapp, the Garrs met leaders of the Burning Bush movement and moved to Chicago to join it. During his time with the movement, Garr was exposed to the use of technology to spread ministry and the use of free healings, which would later affect his ability to spread the Pentecostal faith. As Garr and his wife continued to gain success and more responsibility within the movement, they were asked to pastor a small revival meeting in Kewanee, Illinois, for the Burning Bush and the Pillars of Fire, another Holiness group. Their meeting drew wide success, and they soon held more meetings. Garr eventually resigned from the leadership of the Kewanee congregation in 1903, but still remained part of the Burning Bush movement.

In 1904, the Garrs moved to Danville, Virginia, to lead a new congregation for 18 months. By February 1906, the Garrs moved to Los Angeles by request of the Burning Bush leaders. Garr was named the west coast director of the movement, and his first decision was to get a 1,000-seat facility, an upgrade from the smaller venue the movement had been using. He gradually became disenchanted with the movement, however, and decided to begin visiting the Azusa Street Revival led by William J. Seymour. Lillian soon attended a meeting with him and she was consequently baptized in the Holy Spirit and spoke in tongues.

Garr himself was baptized in the Holy Spirit on June 16, 1906, in the bell tower of the Burning Bush facility. He went on to shut down that church and combine it with the Azusa Street Mission. He brought hundreds of new attendees to Azusa, helping the previously struggling ministry grow. Three weeks after Garr's experience, he said God called on him to take Pentecostalism to India and China. In congruence with this, Garr was taken off of the editor list for the Burning Bush magazine and was denounced by other leaders of the Burning Bush movement.

Before they arrived in India and China, however, the Garrs stopped in Danville to spread the Pentecostal message to their former congregations. Gifts of the Holy Spirit were given to many in the congregation. They then went on to India and arrived in Calcutta, where Garr began preaching on January 13, 1907. He ministered there for three months, believing that God had given him the gift of the Bengali language because one of the attendees at Azusa Street reported recognizing the languages he spoke in tongues as 'languages of India' and Garr heard himself say 'Bengali' before moving to Bombay. By October 8, 1907, the Garrs were in Hong Kong. Garr preached about repentance and restitution, and many in the meetings had convictions of sin.

In the spring of 1908, the Garrs were back in Los Angeles, after the Lord spoke to them about the Pentecostal movement struggling in the states. They decided to travel the states for 16 months to spread the gospel and message of Pentecostalism. During this time, Garr met with Joseph H. King, who went on to become the leader of the Pentecostal Holiness Church. The Garrs went on to travel to Toronto and participate in a meeting where many emerging Pentecostal leaders, such as Aimee Semple McPherson, were also in attendance.

== Later life and legacy ==
In the fall of 1909, the Garrs returned to Hong Kong. Garr then decided to open a missionary home, and shift his focus from pastoring churches to planting them. On April 9, 1911, the Garrs had a son, Alfred Gaeleton Garr Jr. By 1914, the Garrs were back in Los Angeles. Garr rented out a large building for a new congregation he named The Garage. By this time he also decided to live by the Finished Work doctrine and help unite the fractioning Pentecostal movement. He then joined the Assemblies of God.

Lillian died on April 12, 1916, and Garr went on to marry Hannah Erickson on July 26, 1918. They moved to Los Angeles in 1919. In September 1922, Garr partnered with Hannah's father, R.L. Erickson, to evangelize in open-air meetings that included healing services and prayers for the sick. There were several healings and the number of attendees swelled. After this success, Garr went on to travel for the next five years, evangelizing and planting more churches in his wake.

In April 1930, Garr and his family arrived in Charlotte, North Carolina. He held meetings in a tent in a vacant lot and they gradually grew in size after a dramatic healing that caught the attention of local media. Garr then built a wooden tabernacle to increase the size of the crowd that could attend a meeting. The tabernacle was soon bested by the Garr Auditorium, which opened on June 18, 1933. Garr continued to train hundreds of missionaries and ministers until he died on July 23, 1944.
