= Patricia Donoho Hughes =

First Lady of Maryland

First Lady of Maryland
- In role January 17, 1979 – January 21, 1987
- Governor: Harry Hughes
- Preceded by: Jeanne Dorsey Mandel
- Succeeded by: Frances Hughes Glendening

Personal details
- Born: Patricia Donoho; August 18, 1930 Delaware, U.S.
- Died: January 20, 2010 (aged 79) Denton, Maryland, U.S.
- Spouse: Harry Hughes (m. 1951)
- Children: 2
- Education: Sorbonne (1949), Bryn Mawr College (1951), University of Delaware (1966)
- Profession: Teacher

Patricia Donoho Hughes (August 18, 1930 – January 20, 2010) was a First Lady of Maryland, married to former Maryland Governor Harry Hughes. She was educated at the Sorbonne (1949) and Bryn Mawr College (1951). She and Hughes eloped on February 7, 1950, and got a marriage licence in Prince George's county before officially getting married on June 30, 1951. She later continued her education at the University of Delaware (1966). Hughes was a teacher and educator by profession.

While serving as first lady in the 1980s, she worked to restore Government House, the governor's mansion.

== Family ==
The Hughes family lived in Denton, Maryland, and have two daughters, Ann and Elizabeth.

== Death ==
Hughes died on January 20, 2010, in Denton, aged 79, after 16 years of battling Parkinson's disease.

Honorary titles
Preceded by Jeanne Dorsey Mandel	First Lady of Maryland; January 17, 1979 – January 21, 1987	Succeeded by Frances Hughes Glendening
