= 1982 Maryland gubernatorial election =

- November 2, 1982
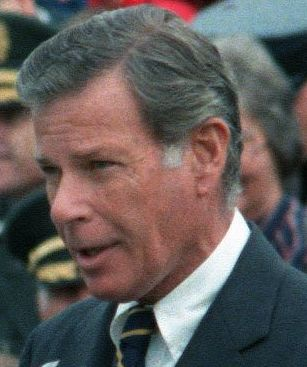

Nominee	Harry Hughes	Robert A. Pascal
Party	Democratic	Republican
Running mate	J. Joseph Curran Jr.	Newton Steers
Popular vote	705,910	432,826
Percentage	61.97%	38.00%
- County results Hughes: 50–60% 60–70% 70–80% Pascal: 50–60%
Governor before election
Harry Hughes
Democratic
Elected Governor
Harry Hughes
Democratic

The 1982 Maryland gubernatorial election was held on November 2, 1982. Incumbent Democrat Harry Hughes defeated Republican nominee Robert A. Pascal with 61.97% of the vote.

== Primary elections ==
Primary elections were held on September 14, 1982.

=== Democratic primary ===
==== Candidates ====
- Harry Hughes, incumbent Governor
- Harry J. McGuirk, State Senator
- Harry W. Kelley
- John J. Schwartz

==== Results ====
Democratic primary results
Party	Candidate	Votes	%
Democratic	Harry Hughes (incumbent)	393,244	66.58
Democratic	Harry J. McGuirk	129,049	21.85
Democratic	Harry W. Kelley	61,271	10.37
Democratic	John J. Schwartz	7,084	1.20
Total votes		590,648	100.00

=== Republican primary ===
==== Candidates ====
- Robert A. Pascal, County Executive of Anne Arundel County
- Ross Zimmerman Pierpont, perennial candidate

==== Results ====
Republican primary results
Party	Candidate	Votes	%
Republican	Robert A. Pascal	113,425	84.27
Republican	Ross Zimmerman Pierpont	21,165	15.73
Total votes		134,590	100.00

== General election ==
=== Candidates ===
- Harry Hughes, Democratic
- Robert A. Pascal, Republican

=== Results ===
1982 Maryland gubernatorial election
Party	Candidate	Votes	%	±%
Democratic	Harry Hughes (incumbent)	705,910	61.97%	
Republican	Robert A. Pascal	432,826	38.00%	
Majority		273,084		
Turnout		1,139,149		
Democratic hold		Swing		
