= Joseph W. Alton =

American politician (1919–2013)

Joseph W. Alton Jr.

1st County Executive of Anne Arundel County
- In office February 1, 1965 – December 2, 1974
- Preceded by: Position established
- Succeeded by: Robert A. Pascal

Member of the Maryland Senate from the Anne Arundel County district
- In office 1963 – February 1, 1965
- Preceded by: John F. McNulty
- Succeeded by: John W. Steffey

Personal details
- Born: Joseph Walter Alton Jr. January 18, 1919 Annapolis, Maryland, U.S.
- Died: March 29, 2013 (aged 94) Annapolis, Maryland, U.S.
- Party: Republican
- Children: 2
- Occupation: sheriff; politician

Joseph W. Alton Jr. (January 18, 1919 – March 29, 2013) was an American politician and a Republican. He represented Anne Arundel County in the Maryland Senate from 1963 to February 1, 1965.

== Early life ==
Joseph Walter Alton Jr. was born in Annapolis, Maryland on January 18, 1919, to Joseph W. Alton, the county sheriff. He graduated from Annapolis High School.

== Career ==
Alton served as Deputy Sheriff of Anne Arundel County from 1947 to 1951. After his father's death in 1950, Alton became the next Sheriff of Anne Arundel County, serving from 1950 to 1962. He represented Anne Arundel County as a State Senator from 1963 to February 1, 1965.

Alton then served as the first County Executive of Anne Arundel County, Maryland from February 1, 1965, to 1974.

In December 1974, Alton pleaded guilty in U.S. District Court to charges of conspiracy to commit extortion for attempting to get $36,000 in kickbacks from consultants. He was sentenced to eighteen months in federal prison, of which he served seven months at Allenwood Federal Prison Camp, in Allenwood, Pennsylvania. He was paroled in September 1975.

== Personal life ==
Alton married and divorced three times. He had two children: Joseph W. Alton III and Marsha J. Alton.

== Death ==
Alton died on March 29, 2013, at Genesis Eldercare Spa Creek Center in Annapolis, two days after his son, Joseph W. Alton III.

Preceded by No one	Anne Arundel County Executive; 1965—1974	Succeeded by Robert A. Pascal
