= Ben Barry =

Canadian fashion businessman

- Born: February 9, 1983 (age 43); Ottawa, Ontario, Canada
- Education: University of Toronto, University of Cambridge
- Writing career
- Notable work: Fashioning Reality: A New Generation of Entrepreneurship
- Notable awards: Queen's Golden Jubilee Medal, Governor General's Award in Commemoration of the Persons Case

Ben Barry (born February 9, 1983) is a Canadian entrepreneur, academic, author, and women's health advocate. He is currently the Dean of Fashion at the New School. Ben is the founder and CEO of the Ben Barry Agency, a modelling agency and consultancy known for its use of diverse models, and the author of the Canadian bestseller Fashioning Reality: A New Generation of Entrepreneurship.

== Early life and career ==
Barry was born in Ottawa, Ontario. In 2001, Teen People magazine included him on its list of "One of 20 Teens Who Would Change the World". He attended the Elmwood School before moving on to Ashbury College, and graduated from the University of Toronto, where he was a member of Trinity College, in 2005 with a BA in Women's Studies and Political Science. He later attended the University of Cambridge and completed an MPhil in Innovation, Strategy, and Organization in 2007 and a PhD with an Ogilvy Foundation research grant at Cambridge Judge Business School in 2012. Barry's second book, Beyond Beauty: Discovering, Challenging, and Refining Beauty, will examine perceptions of beauty across the world and will be based on his Ph.D. research. He is the Chair of the Board of Directors of the Toronto Fashion Incubator, and sits on the Board of the Canadian Foundation for Women's Health. Barry was an assistant professor of equity, inclusivity, and diversity in fashion at the Toronto Metropolitan University School of Fashion before being promoted to Chair of the School of Fashion in 2018. In 2021, he was hired as the new Dean of Fashion at the New School in New York City, New York, USA. He also writes a bi-weekly small business column for The Globe and Mail, Canada's national newspaper of record.

== Ben Barry Agency ==
Barry began the Ben Barry Agency at the age of 14, an agency known for its use of diverse models; those of widely different sizes, races, ages, and abilities. This was in contrast to most modelling agencies of the time which imposed strict height, weight, and age requirements. The Agency took part in the Dove Campaign for Real Beauty. Barry has been acknowledged for his efforts to reform the fashion industry to more accurately represent women's diversity, and to end the use of a standard physical beauty ideal.

== Awards ==
He has been awarded the Queen's Golden Jubilee Medal and is the inaugural male recipient of the Governor General's Awards in Commemoration of the Persons Case. According to Maclean's, he was recognized as "one of twenty-five leaders of tomorrow".
