= Ryan Semple (skier) =

Canadian alpine skier (born 1982)

Ryan Semple (born October 21, 1982, in Montreal, Quebec) is a Canadian alpine skier from Ottawa, Ontario.

Semple's best finish on the Alpine skiing World Cup circuit is 11th place in a combined at Kitzbühel in 2010. Semple has also competed at multiple FIS Alpine World Ski Championships, finishing 15th in the 2005 giant slalom and 19th in the 2007 combined.

Semple competed in both the giant slalom and the combined at the 2006 Olympics in Turin. He failed to finish his first run in the giant slalom, and while he did finish the downhill portion of the combined, he did not finish the first run of the slalom. At the 2010 Olympics in Vancouver he finished 15th in the super combined. He is a graduate of Ashbury College, a private boarding school in Ottawa, Ontario.
