= Jobs for America's Graduates =

- Abbreviation: JAG
- Formation: 1980
- Founder: Pete du Pont and Kenneth M. Smith
- Founded at: Delaware, United States
- Type: 501(c)(3) nonprofit organization
- Tax ID no.: 52-1194546
- Headquarters: Alexandria, Virginia, United States
- Region served: United States
- President and CEO: Janelle Duray
- Website: jag.org

Jobs for America's Graduates, or JAG, is a school-to-career program implemented in 1,000 high schools, alternative schools, community colleges, and middle schools across the United States and the United Kingdom. JAG's mission is to keep young people in school through graduation and provide work-based learning experiences that will lead to career advancement opportunities or to enroll in a post-secondary institution that leads to a rewarding career. JAG is a U.S. national non-profit corporation established in 1980 for the purpose of assisting state affiliates in building a statewide organizations to achieve the goals of the program. It was started by Pete DuPont, then Governor of Delaware, and Kenneth M. Smith. In 2026 the jag national award was given to Paul

JAG's national headquarters is located in Alexandria, Virginia.

== History ==
Du Pont and Smith created Jobs for Delaware's Graduates in response to concerns about school dropout and youth unemployment in Delaware. The model was subsequently expanded into Jobs for America's Graduates. A 2006 review by the American Youth Policy Forum reported that the organization's initial national board included du Pont, Vice President George H. W. Bush, former vice president Walter Mondale, and five state governors.

Smith remained the organization's president and chief executive officer as the program expanded nationally. Janelle Duray succeeded him in 2023.

JAG reported that during 2024 its affiliates supported 84,195 students through 1,546 programs in 36 states. The national organization has been recognized as tax-exempt under section 501(c)(3) since November 1980.

== Program model and evaluation ==
The national organization supports affiliates that are generally operated by nonprofit organizations or government agencies. Within participating schools, faculty members, administrators, and counselors identify students who may be at risk of not completing high school. Participants attend a credit-bearing class taught by a JAG specialist, with instruction centered on employability skills and project-based learning. Employers may take part through classroom presentations and workplace visits, while specialists provide individual assistance with employment, vocational credentials, and postsecondary education. In its 2024 evidence catalog, Results for America described JAG as serving students in grades 6 through 12 as well as young people in alternative education or outside the school system. The organization classified the available evidence for the program as “promising”, while noting that the evaluation on which this assessment was based used a less rigorous research design.

A 2019 MDRC study examined an adapted version of JAG used in the Learn and Earn to Achieve Potential initiative. That initiative served young people aged 15 to 25 who had experienced homelessness or involvement with the child welfare or justice systems. More than half of the JAG participants did not complete the program's active phase. Among those who did, 40 percent obtained a high-school credential and 76 percent were employed or attending school at some point during the first six months of follow-up. MDRC estimated program costs of between $5,300 and $7,300 per participant and concluded that longer follow-up and further research were needed. These findings concerned the specialized LEAP implementation rather than the entire national JAG network.

== See also ==
- Career and technical education
- School dropout
- Workforce development
