= Harry Hughes =

American politician (1926–2019)

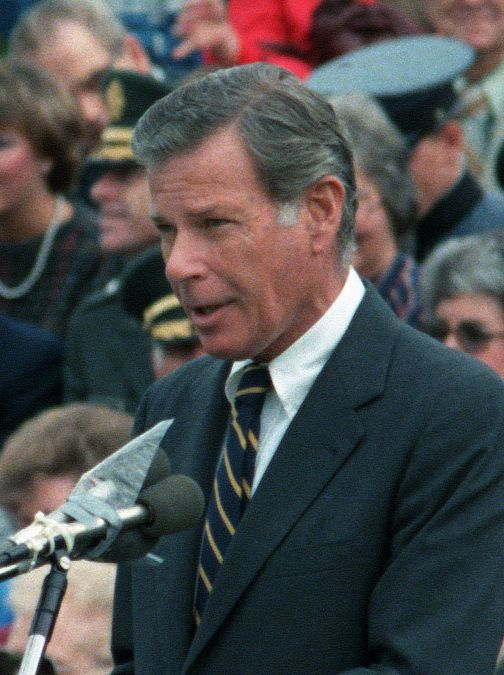
- Hughes in 1985

57th Governor of Maryland
- In office January 17, 1979 – January 21, 1987
- Lieutenant: Samuel Bogley; J. Joseph Curran Jr.
- Preceded by: Marvin Mandel
- Succeeded by: William Donald Schaefer

1st Maryland Secretary of Transportation
- In office July 1, 1971 – May 1977
- Appointed by: Marvin Mandel
- Preceded by: Office established
- Succeeded by: Herman K. Intemann

Member of the Maryland Senate from the 15th district
- In office 1959–1970

Member of the Maryland House of Delegates from Caroline County
- In office 1955–1959

Personal details
- Born: Harry Roe Hughes; November 13, 1926 Easton, Maryland, U.S.
- Died: March 13, 2019 (aged 92) Denton, Maryland, U.S.
- Party: Democratic
- Spouse: Patricia Donoho Hughes (m. 1951; died 2010)
- Children: 2
- Education: Mount St. Mary's University; University of Maryland, College Park (BA); George Washington University (JD)

Military service
- Allegiance: United States
- Branch/service: United States Navy
- Years of service: 1944–1945
- Battles/wars: World War II

Harry Roe Hughes (November 13, 1926 – March 13, 2019) was an American politician from Maryland. A member of the Democratic Party, he served as a member of the Maryland House of Delegates from 1955 to 1959, a member of the Maryland Senate from 1959 to 1970, and the 57th governor of Maryland from 1979 to 1987.

== Early life and family ==
Hughes was born in Easton, Maryland, the son of Helen (Roe) and Jonathan Longfellow Hughes. Hughes attended Caroline County, Maryland, public schools before attending the Mercersburg Academy in Mercersburg, Pennsylvania. After school, Hughes served in the U.S. Naval Air Corps during the World War II.

After the War, Hughes continued his education by attending Mount Saint Mary's University and the University of Maryland, from which he graduated in 1949. At Maryland he was a member of the Alpha Psi chapter of the Theta Chi social fraternity. He received his Juris Doctor degree from The George Washington University Law School in 1952 and was admitted to the Maryland bar the same year. Hughes married his wife, Patricia Donoho Hughes, on June 30, 1951. They have two daughters, Ann and Elizabeth. Patricia Hughes died on January 20, 2010, in Denton, Maryland at the age of 79.

Prior to his election as governor, Hughes was an attorney and one-time professional baseball player in the Eastern Shore League. From 1966 to 1970, Hughes was the chairman of Maryland Democratic State Central Committee.

== Political career ==
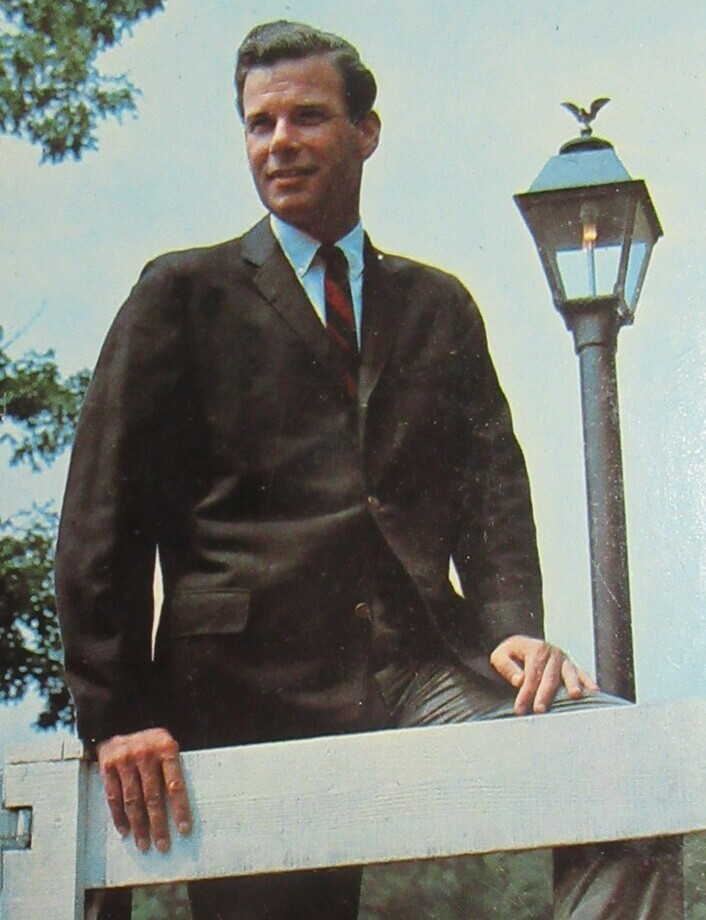
Hughes c. 1966

Hughes began his political career as a member of the Maryland House of Delegates from 1955 to 1959, representing Caroline County, Maryland. He was elected a member of the Maryland Senate in 1958 and served until 1970 for district 15, representing Caroline County, Cecil, Kent, Queen Anne's, and Talbot counties. In 1971, Hughes was offered and accepted the position of secretary of the Maryland Department of Transportation.

In May 1977, however, Hughes resigned from his position because of a disagreement in the State Department of Transportation regarding the award of a construction contract for a subway in Baltimore.

Hughes was elected governor in 1978 after defeating Lieutenant Governor Blair Lee III in the Democratic primary election, and Republican J. Glenn Beall Jr. in the general election. Among other things, Hughes was a strong advocate for the Chesapeake Bay. He signed into law such legislation as that approving the Chesapeake Bay Agreement, which set into motion efforts to restore the Bay and recover from excessive fishing.

Also during his administration, Maryland initiated foreign trade with China. The Savings and loan crisis, involving the failure of many savings and loan organizations across the United States, hit Maryland near the end of Hughes' tenure with the run at Old Court Savings and Loans, but nevertheless steps were taken to insure Maryland savings and loans organizations. Hughes served two terms, defeating Republican challenger Robert A. Pascal in 1982, and concluded his governorship in 1987.

In 1986, Hughes and United States House of Representatives member Michael D. Barnes both unsuccessfully sought the Democratic nomination for the United States Senate seat being vacated by Charles Mathias. They lost to Barbara Mikulski, who went on to win the general election. Hughes is the most recent sitting governor to lose a primary for the United States Senate while not running against an incumbent.

== Later career ==
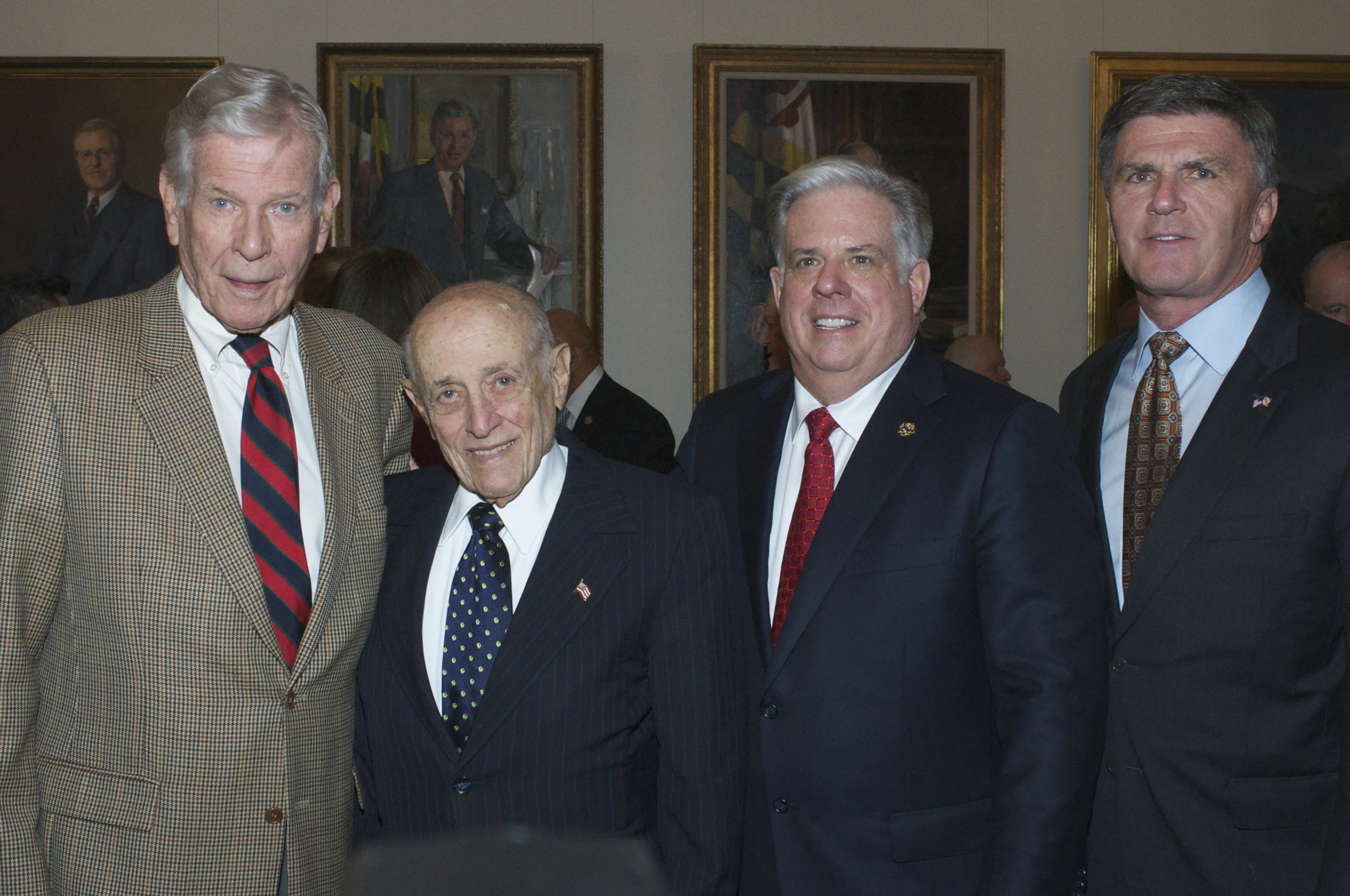
Hughes with Marvin Mandel, Larry Hogan, and Bob Ehrlich in January 2015

Hughes was a member of the Chesapeake Bay Trust from 1995 to 2003; a member of the Board of Regents of the University System of Maryland from 1996 to 2000; the chairman of the Blue Ribbon Citizens Pfiesteria Commission in 1997; the chairman of the Maryland Appellate Judicial Nominating Commission from 1999 to 2003; and a member of the committee to Establish the Maryland Survivors Scholarship Fund from 2001 to 2002. Hughes was a member of the Advisory Committee for the Eastern Shore Land Conservancy's board of directors.

Hughes published an autobiography in 2006.

After a series of illnesses, including pneumonia, Hughes died under hospice care at his home in Denton, Maryland on March 13, 2019, aged 92.

== See also ==
- Ann Hull, Hughes' executive assistant from 1979 to 1985 and chair of Hughes' Governor's Commission to Revise the Mental Retardation and Developmental Disabilities Laws.

Party political offices
| Preceded by Marvin Mandel | Democratic nominee for Governor of Maryland; 1978, 1982 | Succeeded by William Donald Schaefer |
| Preceded by Vera Hall | Chair of the Maryland Democratic Party; 1994–1997 | Succeeded by Peter B. Krauser |
Political offices
| Preceded by Marvin Mandel | Governor of Maryland; 1979–1987 | Succeeded by William Donald Schaefer |
