= Adrian Harewood =

Canadian journalist

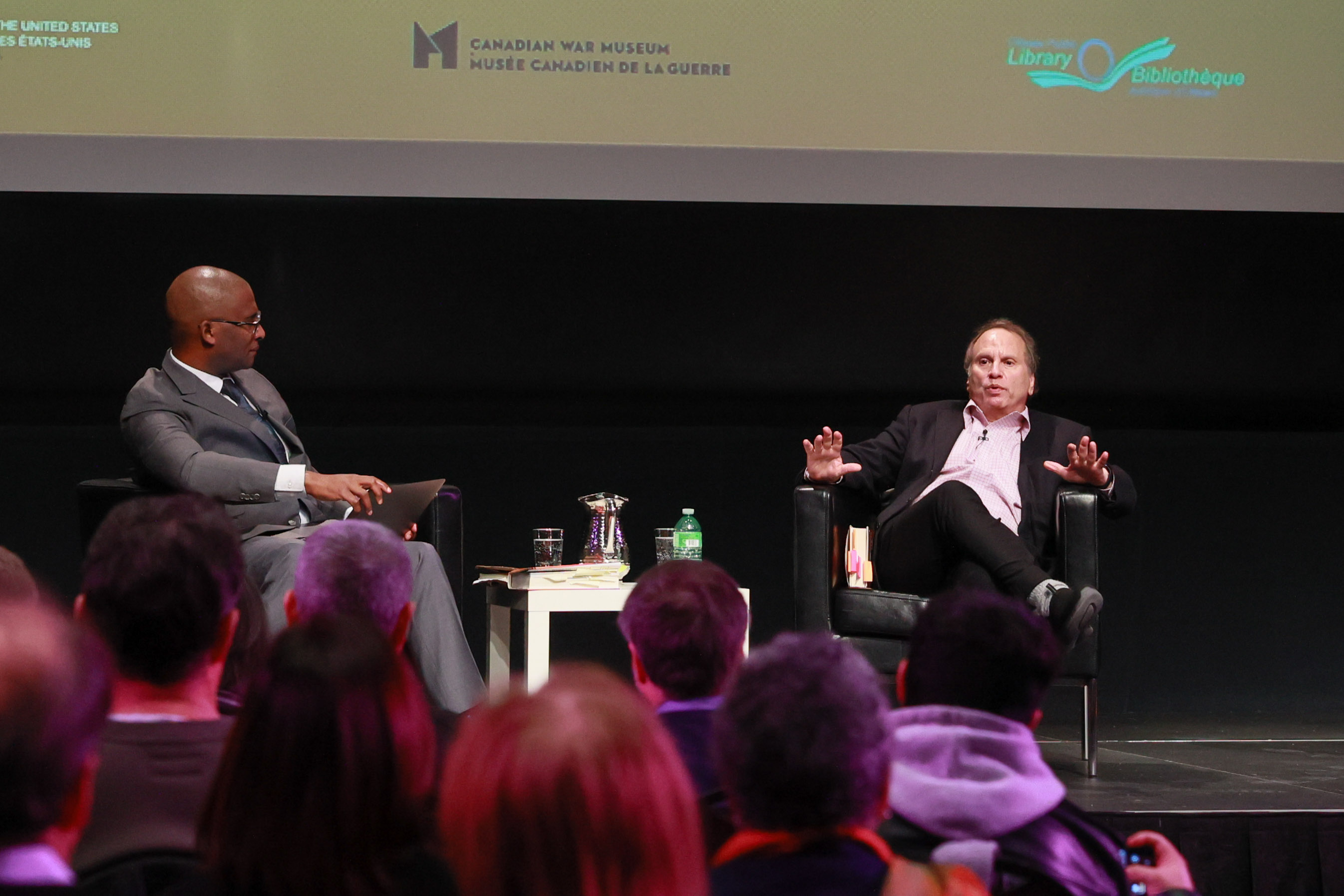
Harewood (left) interviews author Buzz Bissinger (right) in 2023

Adrian Harewood is a Canadian television and radio journalist, and the anchor of CBOT's CBC News: Ottawa at 5/5:30/6 and CBC News: Late Night in Ottawa.

An Ottawa native, Harewood attended Ashbury College, a private school in Rockcliffe, where he was headboy. Harewood volunteered for CKCU-FM and CHUO-FM before moving to Montreal, earning a degree from McGill University in political science and becoming a programmer and station manager for CKUT-FM. At CKUT, he hosted a weekly program, Soul Perspective, about Black Canadian issues. Notably, he devoted several episodes of the program to the issue of homophobia in the black community after a performance poetry night at which poet Judge Dread Mathematik performed a work which some audience members felt was homophobic.

He later joined CBC Radio, becoming a journalist and substitute host on CBLA-FM in Toronto, before being named the permanent host of CBO-FM's All in a Day in 2006. He remained in that role until September 2009, when he joined CBC News: Late Night. Some of the national programs he has hosted on CBC Radio and CBC Television include As it Happens, Sounds Like Canada, The Current and CounterSpin as well as Toronto shows Metro Morning, Ontario Morning, and Here and Now. He was also the host of The Actors, The Directors and Literati as seen on BRAVO and PBS.
