= Ashbury College =

- Coat of arms

Location
- 362 Mariposa Avenue; Ottawa, Ontario, K1M 0T3; Canada; 45.447586°N 75.675663°W

Information
- School type: Independent day and boarding
- Motto: Probitas, Virtus, Comitas (Honesty, Courage, Kindness)
- Religious affiliation: Anglican
- Established: 1891
- Founder: George Woollcombe
- Headmaster: Norman Southward
- Faculty: 70
- Grades: 3 to 12
- Gender: Coeducational
- Enrollment: 580 Senior School; 150 Junior School (approximate values)
- Campus: Rockcliffe Park, Ontario
- Campus type: Suburban
- Houses: Woollcombe, Alexander, New, Connaught
- Colours: Maroon, Green and Blue
- Mascot: Colt
- Endowment: $16,000,000 CAD
- Website: ashbury.ca

Ashbury College is an independent day and boarding school located in the Rockcliffe Park area of Ottawa, Ontario, Canada. It was founded in 1891 by former faculty of Bishop's College School in Quebec to accommodate BCS students living in Ottawa. Ashbury College moved to its current location in 1910. Previously, it occupied what now houses Senate of Canada offices. It is an International Baccalaureate World School, a member of the Canadian Accredited Independent Schools, and a member of Round Square. The school currently enrolls approximately 550 senior (grades 9-12) and 200 junior (grades 3-8) students. The current Head of School is Norman Southward, with Andrew Young directing the Junior School and Brad Moyle as the Head of Senior School.

Ashbury College is an independent school which offers a joint Ontario High School Diploma and Ashbury College Diploma, as well as the International Baccalaureate Diploma and International Baccalaureate Bilingual Diploma. Originally a single-gender boys school, Ashbury began accepting female students in 1982. The male/female student proportion is approximately equal. The campus is 13 acres (48,562.277 m^{2}) in Rockcliffe Park. There are 108 boarders yearly from approximately 60 countries throughout the world.

Notable alumni include John Turner, Canada's seventeenth Prime Minister; Stockwell Day, former leader of the Official Opposition; Ben Barry, founder of the modeling agency Ben Barry Agency Inc.; Canadian war artist and heraldry expert Alan Beddoe; actor Matthew Perry; and journalist Adrian Harewood.

== History ==
In 1888, a young Oxford graduate (George Wollcombe, B.A.) started his career at Bishop's College School and Bishop's University when he was invited there by the BCS Rector/BU Principal, the Rev. Dr. Thomas Adams (Oxford). In 1891, Wollcombe was recommended by the head of Bishop's, and by some Ottawa-based parents of his BCS students, to start a school there. The Ottawa school eventually became Ashbury College, where Wollcombe served as the headmaster for 42 years from 1891 to 1933. He still found time regularly to make the four-hour train journey to Lennoxville to teach his classes. He obtained an ad eundem Master of Arts from Bishop's in 1906 without actually being enrolled as a student by the arrangements of Bishop's with Oxford.

Rhodes Scholar Dr. C.L. Odgen Glass graduated from BCS and BU in 1935 and served at Ashbury as the fourth headmaster, but he later returned to BCS. The BCS-Ashbury Cup, the Oxford University and Bishop's University arms presented on the stained glass in Ashbury Memorial Chapel are signs of the traditional friendship between these institutions. Wollcombe also eventually became the headmaster of BCS later.

The three-room school for boys was originally located on Wellington Street in Ottawa, but soon moved to bigger quarters on Wellington Street to what was the Victoria Chambers (now Victoria Building). In 1900, Ashbury College moved to Argyle Avenue near the present Museum of Nature. In 1905, Ashbury College had twenty borders, fifty day boys, led by the headmaster and a staff of five graduates. There was a preparatory department for little boys. The students were prepared for the Royal Military College of Canada and universities. Eleven boys had entered the Royal Military College of Canada between 1900 and 1905.

In 1910, the school (called Ashbury College after Woollcombe's English home) moved to its current location on 13 acres (5.2-hectare) in the village of Rockcliffe Park. Arthur Le B. Weeks (architect) designed the Ashbury College building (1909) on Mariposa Avenue. With the support of Ottawa benefactors, a new building was constructed for the 115 students, 48 of whom were boarders.

Ashbury was originally an all-boys institution but began admitting females for grades 9–12 in 1982 and then admitted girls for the first time into fourth grade (the youngest grade offered) in 2010. The institution is divided between the Senior School and the Junior School, which have separate faculties and students but share resources such as the cafeteria (MacLaren Hall), gymnasiums, art departments, music facilities, theatre, and the chapel.

In 2016, Ashbury celebrated its 125th birthday. Alumni receptions around the world were held as well as numerous events in Ottawa.

Ashbury College's innovative and modern adaptations include Canada's first teaching green roof, and a LEED Gold-certified boys' residence. Ashbury College was included amongst other architecturally interesting and historically significant buildings in Doors Open Ottawa, held June 2 and 3, 2012.

== Stained glass ==
In 1952, a stained glass window depicting Sir Galahad was erected by Robert McCausland Limited as a memorial dedicated to students who served during the Great War and World War II.

The Memorial Window in memory of Canon Woollcombe, Ashbury's founder and Headmaster, was unveiled and dedicated on October 29, 1961, by the Venerable Archdeacon C. G. Hepburn. The window features seven symbolic designs: the Crown and Palm, for Wisdom; Ivy for Fidelity; a Vine symbolizing the Blood of Christ; a Sheaf of Wheat for the Body of Christ; Oak leaves for Strength; and a Cross and Wreath signifying Peace. The crests refer to Canon Woollcombe's academic affiliations to Bishop's University, Oxford University, McGill University and Ashbury College. The three large windows show pictorial representations of Canon Woollcombe as Teacher, Preacher and Counsellor. The large left hand window includes the Torch of Light; the Centre window shows a Spiritual Flame, with the School Motto in the Circle surrounding Canon Woollcombe, and the Ashbury buildings in the background. The Lamp of learning is at the top of the right hand window.

A window is dedicated to the memory of alumni Michael F. A. Ney (RMC 1944) R.C.N., who was killed in an accident in Kenya on October 31, 1954, while serving as an inspector with the Kenya Police Service. The 1955 design includes the crests of the Royal Roads Military College and of Trinity College at the University of Toronto and the message "First unto God and then to the Queen". A window is dedicated to Alfred Beaufort Belcher a member of Ashbury staff from 1942 until his death April 4, 1963. The 1955 design includes the crests of the Royal Military College of Canada and a few lines of one of Belcher's poems "and God runs quiet fingers through ...the tired hair of the World".

== Senior School ==
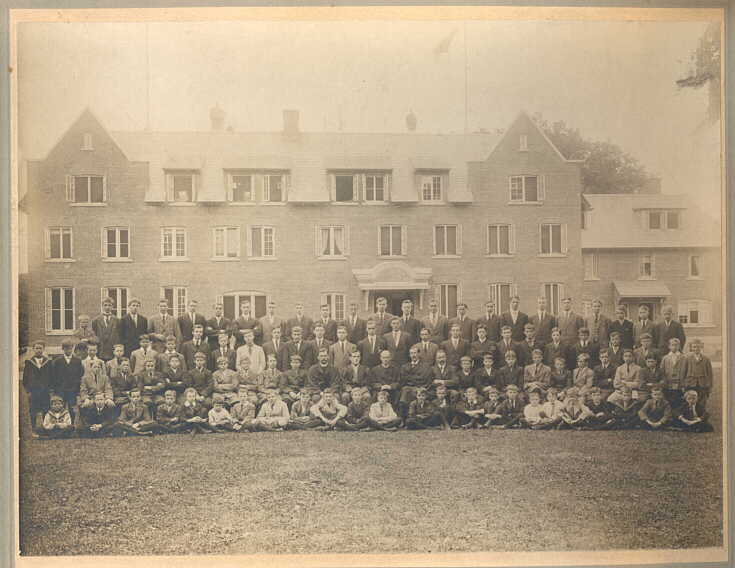
The 1902 Wilson Shield winners.

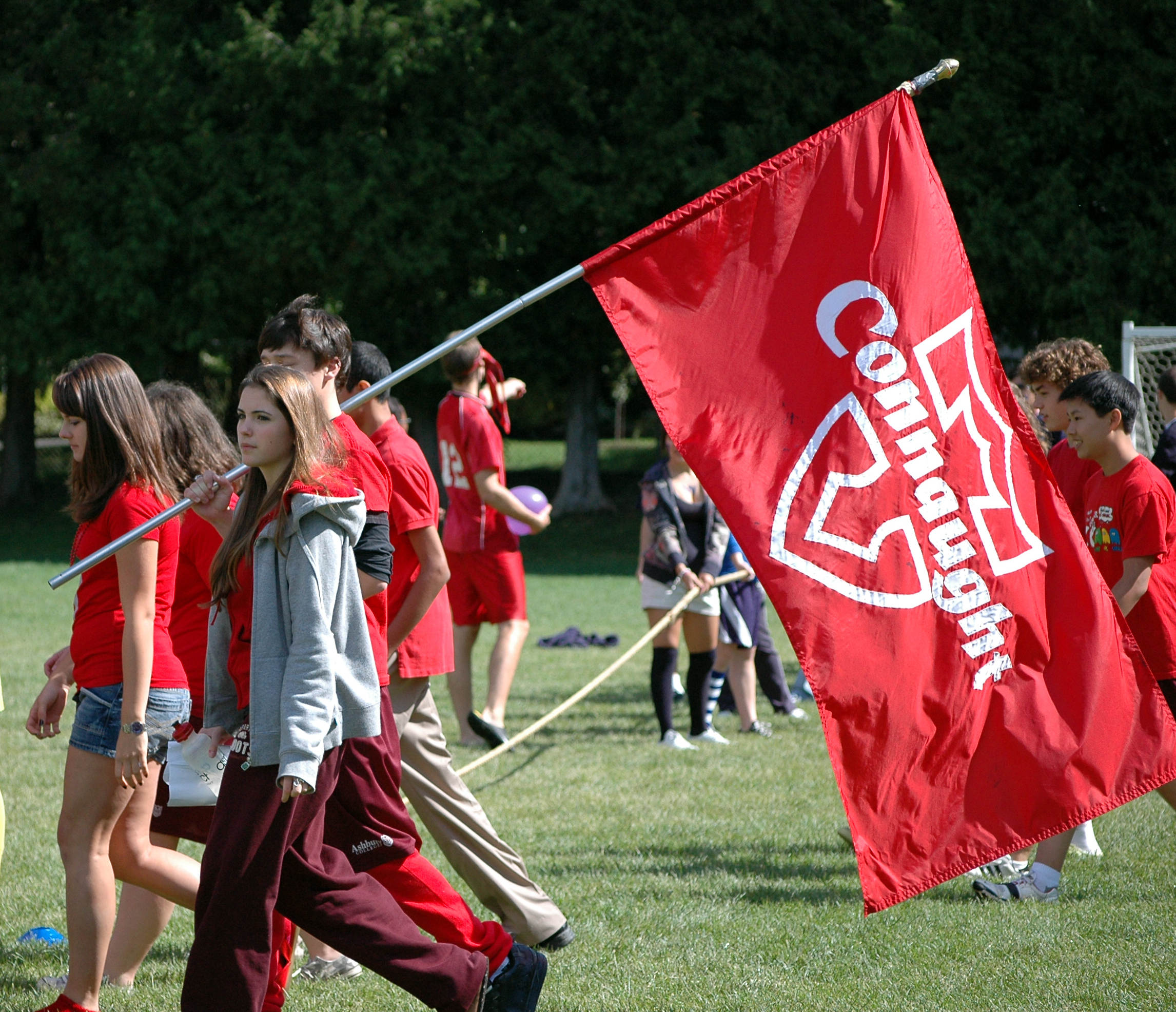
A student in Connaught House carries the House Flag during a competition.

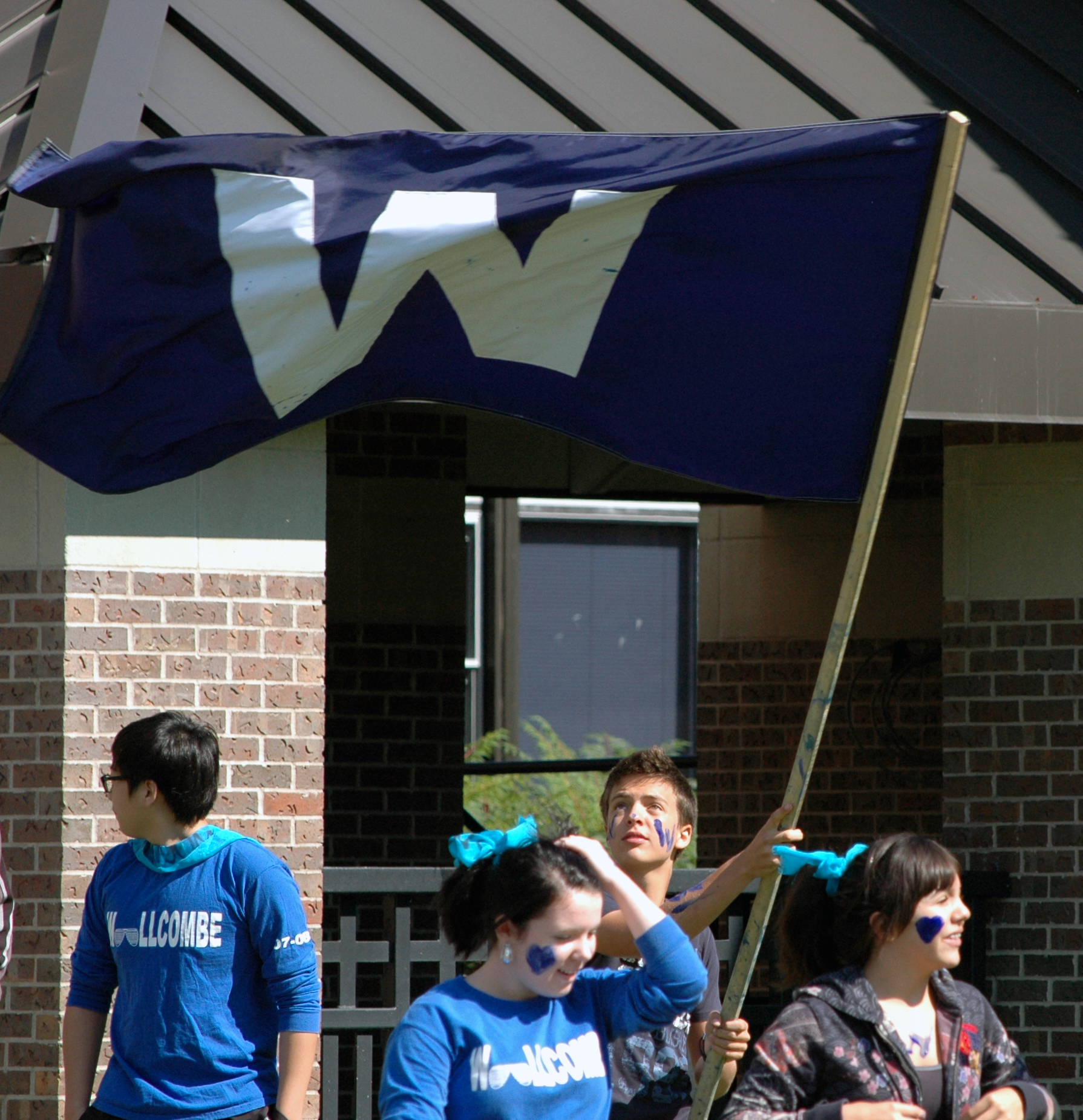
Woolcombe House students during an event.

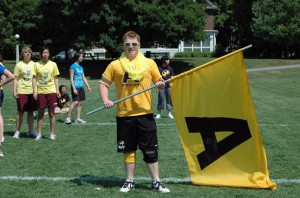
Alexander House Flag during House Games.

Ashbury College offers the traditional Ontario Secondary School Diploma but also the International Baccalaureate Diploma, otherwise known as the IB. Students take six academic subjects each year and the Senior School program is grades 9 through 12. Ashbury follows a traditional approach to education in the liberal arts and requires participation in athletics and volunteering/community service in order to graduate. Approximately 20% of the students are considered international students. Each graduating class is approximately 140 students.

=== House system and prefects ===
The House system has been in place since 1937 and Ashbury students are divided into four houses upon entering Ashbury. Each house has roughly 30 students per grade and 120 in each house during any academic year with the exception of Woollcombe House that has roughly 80. Students with older siblings or alumni parents are put in their "family" house and others are randomly assigned. Houses are permanent from grade nine until graduation and identification is often through the house-specific neck-tie or commonly worn house T-shirts during physical education, house events or after 4:00 pm when No. 3 (casual) uniform can be worn. The houses compete for the "Wilson Shield" which is awarded at the end of the academic year. The houses are:

- Woollcombe House (Blue)
- New House (Green)
- Connaught House (Red)
- Alexander House (Yellow)

The junior school houses are:

- Goblins (Blue)
- Wizards (Green)
- Hobbits (Red)
- Dragons (Yellow)

Each house is led by prefects, graduating students chosen for their leadership, role-model ability, involvement in school life and strong academic standing. Prefects are typically identified by their burgundy blazers.

=== University placement ===
Ashbury College offers the International Baccalaureate Bilingual Diploma program and has had a university placement rate of 100% for the past fifteen years. Graduates often matriculate to colleges and universities in Canada, the United States, and around the globe.

In 2018, the average SAT score from Ashbury College was 1255/1600, and the average ACT score was 26/36 (87th percentile). Moreover, the average IB Diploma score is 33, 3 points above the global average of 30. In that same year, eighty percent of students were admitted to their first choice university, and the most popular university choices were the University of Toronto, the University of Ottawa, McGill University, and Queen's University. Other graduates are enrolled in US post-secondary schools such as Amherst College, Brown University, Cornell University, and Harvard University.

=== Student life ===
Students in grade 9 and 10 are required to participate in co-curricular activities in all three terms. Grade 11 students must participate in co-curricular activities in two terms and grade 12s in one term. As a requirement for the Ontario Diploma, all students complete a minimum of 40 Community Service Hours with an additional 20 hours for to complete the Ashbury Diploma. Ashbury also offers co-curricular programs in bilingual debating, drama and theatre, Model United Nations, the Yearbook Committee, and the 'Blazer' (student magazine), among many others. Additionally, Ashbury students can complete requirements for The Duke of Edinburgh's Award.

==== Athletics ====
Ashbury College is a member of the Canadian Association of Independent Schools, the Ottawa Independent Schools Athletic Association, the Ottawa-Carleton Catholic Intermediate Athletic Association, the National Capital Secondary School Athletic Association (NCSSAA) and the Ontario Federation of School Athletic Associations. Ashbury is recognized for its strong athletics program. In 2017, the senior boys varsity basketball team won the Ontario provincial championship, and the school also captured OFSAA medals in rugby, swimming, Nordic skiing, track and field, and tennis. They also won the OFSAA football independent bowl in 2018. Ashbury won the football tier one city championship in 2019. Ashbury maintains teams for the following sports:

- Badminton
- Baseball
- Basketball
- Cross country running
- Curling
- Downhill Skiing
- Field Hockey
- Football
- Golf
- Ice hockey
- Rowing
- Rugby union
- Soccer
- Softball
- Swimming
- Tennis
- Touch football
- Track and Field
- Ultimate Frisbee
- Volleyball

== Junior School ==
The Junior School is a division of Ashbury College for students from grade 4 to grade 8. Unlike the Senior School's blue colours, Junior School uses green as its dominant colour which is prevalent in many locations as a symbol, including the website and uniforms. Junior School students typically wear uniform ties with maroon, grey, and green stripes, while Senior School students wear a specific Senior school tie on Mondays and wear an appropriate tie of choice on other days of the week, including but not limited to house ties. Like the Senior School, Junior School students are placed into one of four houses upon their arrival.

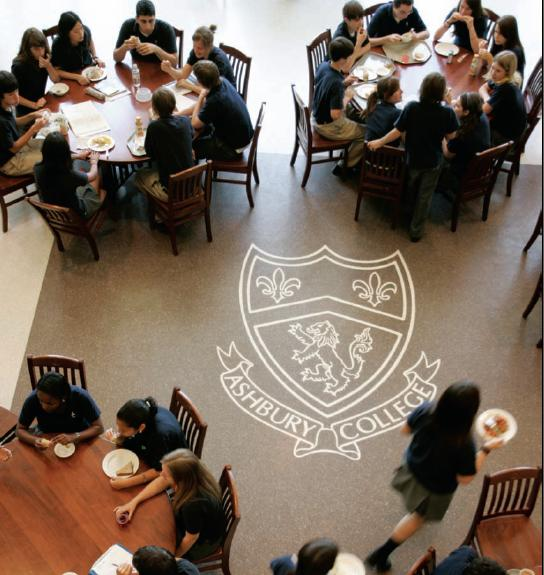
Students in summer uniform eat in the Maclaren Hall

- Dragons (Yellow)
- Hobbits (Red)
- Wizards (Green)
- Goblins (Blue)

Houses compete extensively throughout the academic year and house points are accumulated throughout the year. Students are identified by house in many situations, primarily athletic, where everyone sports a house shirt with varying colours for physical education activities. Students are also assigned a "home form", where there are presently one for each of grades 4 and 5, two for grade 6, and three for grades 7-8.

== Maclaren Hall ==
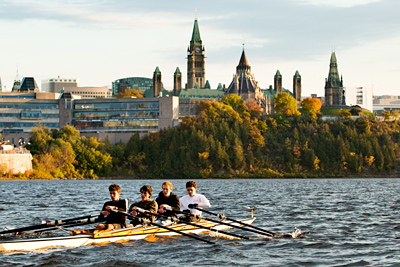
Students competing for the Ashbury College rowing team on the Ottawa River

Maclaren Hall, formerly known as the Great Hall, is Ashbury's cafeteria. Opened in 2004, the MacLaren Hall serves breakfast, lunch and dinner for boarders and lunch for day students (Junior and Senior school alike). Open from 7:00 am to 7:00 pm, Maclaren Hall offers selections for vegetarians as well as those with other needs. In addition to cash being tendered, students are able to use their student cards to access meal plans and "flex dollars", which is a refillable debit card system.

Maclaren Hall is one part of an addition to the College that was completed in 2004 as a part of the "Building Futures" fundraising campaign. Other additions included a new double gymnasium, four new classrooms (equipped with SmartBoards), a student common area, a staff room, and several offices. The increase in square footage has added more than 20% of usable space to the school.

The Great Hall was renamed in 2006 as the Maclaren Hall in honour of alumnus Don Maclaren.

In 2014, the Creative Learning Centre opened, and in 2018, the school celebrated the groundbreaking of a new Centre for Science & Innovation.

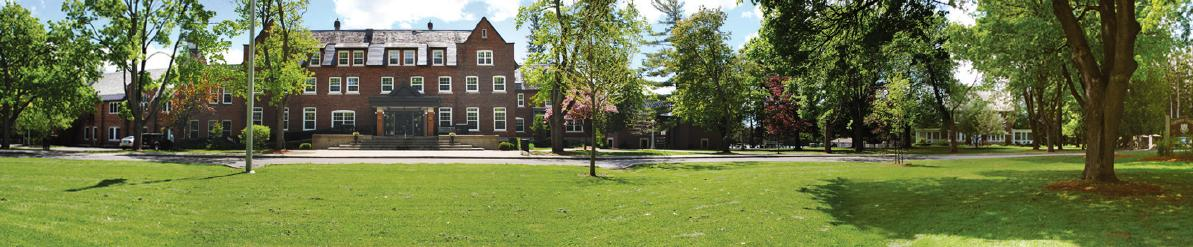
Main entrance of the Ashbury College Campus

== Controversies ==
During a 2007 field trip to Boston, four students allegedly committed sexual assault on another student, sparking controversy and a lawsuit against the school. As a result, several students were expelled, and more stringent punishments were handed down to the perpetrators. The students pleaded guilty in a Boston courtroom to the charges, and were punished according to youth criminal justice laws (namely, probation and juvenile detentions). One of the perpetrators pleaded guilty to assault and battery and was sentenced to four years probation. He apologized to the victim and his family, claiming he was pulling a common prank. The teachers and the school have been criticized for the handling of the incident. The victim and their family submitted victim impact statements detailing the effect the events had on their family.

Two teachers were found guilty for "(failing) in their duty of care" by the Ontario Teachers' College. The college's disciplinary panel initially ruled the teachers guilty as they failed to immediately report the sexual assault to the parents of the boy. However, in December 2015, the two teachers were fully exonerated and charges dismissed, after winning an appeal in the Ontario Divisional Court.

== Notable alumni ==
- John Turner, Canadian Prime Minister
- Stockwell Day, Member of House of Commons
- E. P. Taylor, businessman
- Douglass North, recipient of Nobel Prize in Economics
- Guy Simonds, Canadian Army officer, commander of the II Canadian Corps during World War II, later named Chief of the General Staff
- Matthew Perry, actor best known for his role as Chandler on Friends
- Stewart Johnston, 15th commissioner of the Canadian Football League
- Max Graham, DJ and producer
- Ben Barry, entrepreneur
- John Emilius Fauquier, Royal Canadian Air Force Commodore
- Ryan Semple, 2006, 2010 Olympian, skiing
- Trevor Matthews, founder and CEO of Brookstreet Pictures
- Donald Steven, composer
- Adrian Harewood, CBC news journalist
- Derek Harvie, TV & film writer and producer, Peabody Award recipient
- Arthur Fogel, music promoter and executive, Live Nation Entertainment
- Andrew Brewin, Canadian politician
- John Tuzo Wilson, geophysicist and geologist

== Gallery ==
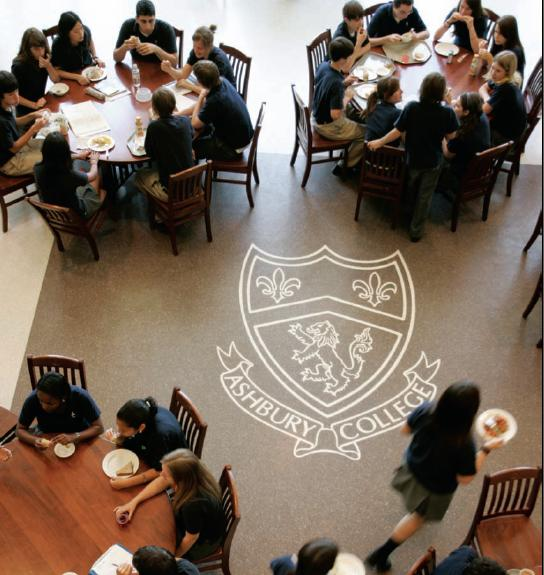

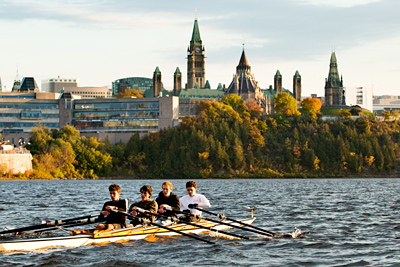

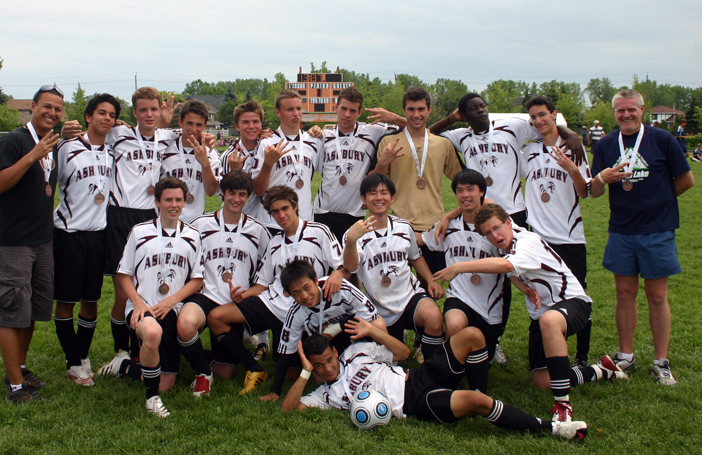

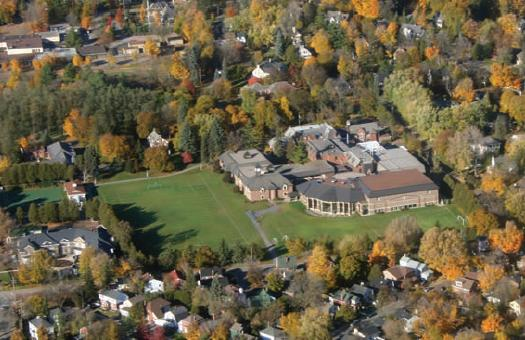
