= Marvin Mandel =

56th governor of Maryland

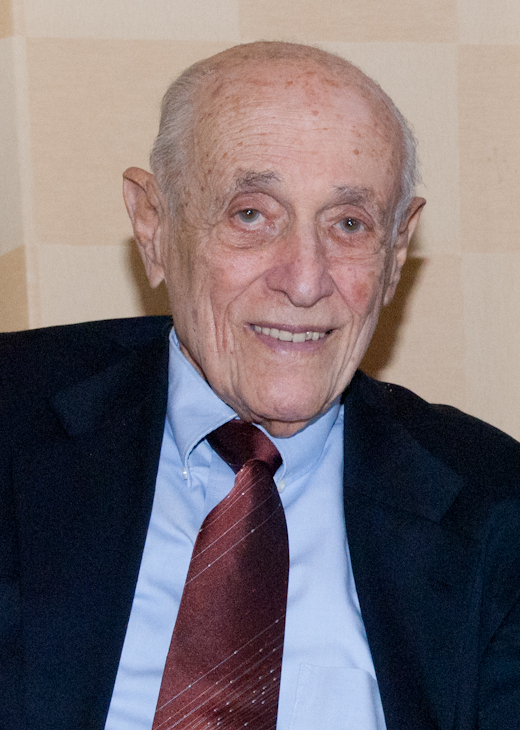
- Mandel in 2015

56th Governor of Maryland
- In office January 7, 1969 – January 17, 1979^{[a]}
- Lieutenant: None (1969–1971); Blair Lee III (1971–1979)
- Preceded by: Spiro Agnew
- Succeeded by: Harry Hughes

Chair of the National Governors Association
- In office June 4, 1972 – June 3, 1973
- Preceded by: Arch A. Moore Jr.
- Succeeded by: Daniel J. Evans

Speaker of the Maryland House of Delegates
- In office February 1964 – January 1969
- Preceded by: A. Gordon Boone
- Succeeded by: Thomas Hunter Lowe

Member of the Maryland House of Delegates from Baltimore City District 5
- In office 1952–1969
- Preceded by: Hugh A. Kennedy
- Succeeded by: Steven V. Sklar

Personal details
- Born: April 19, 1920 Baltimore, Maryland, U.S.
- Died: August 30, 2015 (aged 95) Compton, Maryland, U.S.
- Resting place: Lakemont Memorial Gardens, Davidsonville, Maryland, U.S.
- Party: Democratic
- Spouses: Barbara Oberfeld (m. 1941; div. 1974); Jeanne Blackistone Dorsey (m. 1974; died 2001)
- Education: University of Maryland, College Park (BA); University of Maryland, Baltimore (LLB)
- a. Blair Lee III served as acting governor from June 4, 1977, to January 15, 1979.

Marvin Mandel (April 19, 1920 – August 30, 2015) was an American politician and lawyer who served as the 56th governor of Maryland from January 7, 1969, to January 17, 1979, including a one-and-a-half-year period when Lieutenant Governor Blair Lee III served as the state's acting governor from June 1977 to January 15, 1979 while Mandel was in federal prison for mail fraud and racketeering. He was a member of the Democratic Party, as well as Maryland's first, and to date, only Jewish governor.

Before he became the state's Governor, Mandel had been Speaker of the Maryland House of Delegates from 1964 to 1969 and a delegate since 1952.

Mandel was elected as Governor of Maryland on January 7, 1969, by the joint vote of both houses of the Maryland General Assembly due to the approaching vacancy created by the election of Spiro T. Agnew, the incumbent governor, as Vice President of the United States, as there was no lieutenant governor at the time to succeed the governor, as in most other states. Such an office was created by amendment in 1970.

== Early life ==
Mandel was born and raised in a Jewish family in Baltimore and attended the Baltimore City Public Schools, graduating from the Baltimore City College, which was a citywide, all-male institution that served as an early model of a college prep, specialized "magnet" school that developed and became popular in American public education 40 years later. Mandel received a Bachelor of Arts degree from the University of Maryland at College Park in 1939 and a Bachelor of Laws degree from the University of Maryland Law School in 1942, also receiving an honorary prize for his part in a school practice court honor case.

== Political career ==
Mandel was first elected to public office in the Maryland House of Delegates in 1952, representing northwest Baltimore. Mandel served several terms throughout the tumultuous events and urban politics of the 1950s and early '60s when civil rights was on the state's front burner, and was finally chosen as Speaker of the House of Delegates in January 1963 and served in that position until January 1969. Speaker Mandel was first elected Governor and then sworn in by the legislative members of both houses in a joint session of the General Assembly in January 1969, upon the resignation of Governor Agnew, who was sworn in as vice president later that month. In his short inaugural speech to the legislators, he famously predicted his method and attitude towards the powers of his office putting aside the indirect and unusual way he came to the executive office and the idea of serving as an "acting governor", from the formerly opposing party, saying, "Make no mistake about it, we intend to govern!". After serving 23 months (almost two years of the unfinished Agnew term), he was duly further elected by the entire Maryland state body of voters in a regular gubernatorial election for a full four-year term in November 1970, and re-elected in a state election in November 1974.

=== Governor ===
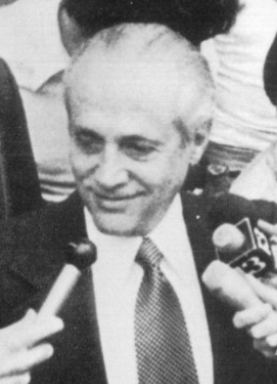
Mandel as governor.

Mandel's executive administration was notable for many reasons. While he was governor, the executive branch of the Maryland state government was reorganized, combining the recent 20th-century growth of commissions, boards, offices, bureaus and agencies into twelve departments headed by supervising secretaries with several administrative levels in each executive department. Each secretary and their assistants and deputies reported directly to the governor and their chief-of-staff, reflecting the current American federal presidency and presidential cabinet system.

Additionally, the mass-transit system of Maryland was established and fostered under Mandel, enacting plans begun back in 1969 for the establishment of two urban subway networks. The first such rail network was for the Baltimore metropolitan area and its two adjoining suburban counties of Baltimore County and Anne Arundel County), and the second was for the National Capital area of Washington, D.C. (comprising several northern Virginia counties, and the Maryland suburban counties of Montgomery and Prince George's Counties).

A statewide public school construction program initiative for Baltimore and the 23 counties of Maryland to be equalized and fully funded by the State was undertaken while Mandel was governor. Accordingly, students in kindergarten or first grade would begin their public education through to high school with equally adequate buildings, supplies and teachers.

The additional executive departmental reorganization and structure simplified the state government. Although narrowly rejected by state voters in a 1968 referendum (because of several large controversial proposals), many of the proposed charter's other more generally acceptable provisions and reorganizations were later pushed past the legislature by the new Mandel administration and enacted into law and policy by the voters in several special elections/referendums and the edicts of the Mandel and later Hughes and Schaefer administrations. This included the reorganized four-level state court system.

Other similar administrative organizations and efficiencies were reflected in the various other departments as they were set up and took shape with the various "administrations", authorities" and "offices" arrayed beneath the state secretaries in the governor's new cabinet, including newer unprecedented departments such as the environment, general services, public safety and correctional services, and natural resources.

Mandel's idea to grow Maryland business and create more jobs was to attract existing overseas companies to the state. In 1972, Mandel selected Philip Kapneck, a local businessman, to start Maryland's International Business efforts by opening an office in Brussels, Belgium. In 1974, Mandel appointed Kapneck as Maryland Trade Ambassador. Mandel's initiative was so successful that over the next 40 years, his Trade Ambassador attracted hundreds of businesses, creating more than a hundred thousand jobs.

== Legal controversy ==
Mandel was convicted in 1977 along with five co-defendants of mail fraud and racketeering. The charges stemmed from what prosecutors said was a complicated scheme in which Mandel was given money and favors for vetoing one bill and signing another to help his friends make money on a race track deal. On June 4, 1977, he notified Lieutenant Governor Blair Lee III that Lee would have to serve as "Acting Governor of Maryland" until further notice. Lee continued to serve as "Acting Governor" until January 15, 1979, when Mandel rescinded his letter appointing Lee as "Acting Chief Executive" (just two days before the expiration of his second full term) on the basis of his overturned previous legal conviction and the neutral legal opinions on the status of his appeal case, that the governor was now eligible to re-assume the powers of his office previously delegated to Lee, even at that late date.

Mandel had already served nineteen months of his original sentence in the low-security federal prison camp at Eglin Air Force Base in Florida, before having his sentence commuted by President Ronald Reagan in 1981.

Based on the reasoning of an opinion of the U.S. Supreme Court, a U.S. District Court judge overturned the former governor's conviction in 1987. A year after that, the U.S. Court of Appeals for the Fourth Circuit affirmed the final decision, ending the long legal and political saga.

In addition, in 1980, Mandel's administrative aide Maurice R. Wyatt, Maryland District Court Judge Allen B. Spector, and State Health Department director Donald H. Noren were tried and convicted by Judge James Macgill on bribery charges related to payments for land development and septic tank installation moratoriums. Although not connected with Gov. Mandel's personal integrity and administration, these additional trials and convictions cast a pall on an otherwise overwhelming record of positive accomplishments in Maryland during the Mandel years.

Mandel's official gubernatorial portrait was not hung in the governor's Reception Room of the Maryland State House, the historic state capitol, with the most recent occupants of the office, until 1993, fourteen years after he left the executive chair and two administrations had intervened.

== Personal life ==
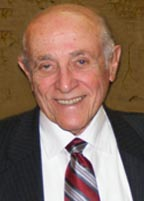
Mandel in 2008

Mandel married Barbara Oberfeld (his first wife) on June 8, 1941, at age 22 and later had two children, Gary and Ellen. Mandel announced through his press office on July 3, 1973, that he was leaving his wife of 32 years to marry the woman he loved, Jeanne Blackistone Dorsey. In 1974, after temporarily moving out of the governor's mansion into a small Annapolis apartment and separating from his first wife, Mandel later obtained a decree of divorce from Oberfeld, who had remained in the mansion and attempted to continue to act as "First Lady" and maintain a domestic life. After finally coming to a legal and domestic agreement, Oberfeld left and moved to her own quarters. Thereafter, Mandel soon married Dorsey, who occasionally entertained and performed some official functions as "First Lady" of the State in the later Mandel administration. Dorsey died on October 6, 2001, after 27 years of marriage to Mandel.

Mandel lived briefly in Arnold, Maryland, and lived and practiced law in Annapolis.

Mandel served as the chairman of the governor's Commission on the Structure and Efficiency of State Government, beginning in 2003. He was also a member of the Board of Regents for the University System of Maryland from 2003 through 2009.

Mandel died on August 30, 2015, at the age of 95 in Compton, Maryland. After lying in state at the Maryland State House, a funeral service was held in Pikesville, and he was interred at Lakemont Memorial Gardens in Davidsonville, Maryland. A Fall 2017 issue of his law school's magazine reported that Mandel had since been inducted into the Jewish Community Center of Greater Baltimore Hall of Fame.

== See also ==
- List of people pardoned or granted clemency by the president of the United States

Political offices
Preceded by Gordon Boone	Speaker of the Maryland House of Delegates; 1964–1969	Succeeded by Thomas Lowe
Preceded by Spiro Agnew	Governor of Maryland; 1969–1979	Succeeded by Harry Hughes
Preceded by Arch Moore	Chair of the National Governors Association; 1972–1973	Succeeded by Daniel Evans
Party political offices
Preceded by George Mahoney	Democratic nominee for Governor of Maryland; 1969, 1970, 1974	Succeeded by Harry Hughes
Preceded by Robert W. Scott	Chair of the Democratic Governors Association; 1971–1972	Succeeded by Dale Bumpers
