= Henry S. Magraw =

American politician (1815–1867)

Member of the Maryland House of Delegates from the Cecil County district
- In office 1867 – February 1, 1867 Serving with Alexander Evans, John Golibart, William Lindsey, George P. Whitaker
- Preceded by: Jesse A. Kirk, James McCauley, Jethro J. McCullough, George B. Pennington
- Succeeded by: John Ward Davis, Levi R. Mearns, William Richards, James Touchstone

24th Treasurer of Pennsylvania
- In office May 1, 1856 – May 1, 1859
- Governor: James Pollock; William F. Packer
- Preceded by: Eli Slifer
- Succeeded by: Eli Slifer

Personal details
- Born: Henry Slaymaker Magraw; December 17, 1815 West Nottingham, Maryland, U.S.
- Died: February 1, 1867 (aged 51) Washington, D.C., U.S.
- Resting place: West Nottingham Cemetery
- Party: Democratic
- Spouse: Emily W. Hopkins
- Children: 4
- Occupation: Politician; lawyer

Henry Slaymaker Magraw (December 17, 1815 – February 1, 1867) was an American politician and lawyer. He served as State Treasurer of Pennsylvania from 1856 to 1859. He served as a member of the Maryland House of Delegates, representing Cecil County in 1867.

== Early life ==
Henry Slaymaker Magraw was born on December 17, 1815, in West Nottingham, Maryland, to Rebecca (née Cochran) and James Magraw. His father was a Presbyterian minister and founded the Presbyterian Church in West Nottingham. He attended West Nottingham Academy. He studied law in Lancaster, Pennsylvania, with John R. Montgomery and was admitted to the bar on December 1, 1838.

== Career ==
Magraw moved to Pittsburgh. He was admitted to the bar in Allegheny County on February 4, 1839. He practiced law there with Robert McKnight. He was a Democrat. In 1845, he was the Democratic nominee for Mayor of Pittsburgh. He was appointed deputy attorney general of Allegheny County in 1845. He resigned the post in October 1848.

In 1850, Magraw moved to California and practiced law a year there. In 1852, he returned to Pennsylvania and worked as an attorney there until 1863. He was elected as State Treasurer of Pennsylvania and served in that role for three terms, from May 1, 1856, to May 1, 1859. He ran again in 1859, but lost to Eli Slifer.

In July 1861, Magraw was present at the First Battle of Bull Run trying to retrieve the body of James Cameron. He was then imprisoned by the Confederates in Richmond, Virginia.

In 1866, Magraw was elected as a member of the Maryland House of Delegates, representing Cecil County. He served with Alexander Evans, William Lindsey and George P. Whitaker. The four delegates were known as "The Big Four" due to their physical size.

== Personal life ==
Magraw married Emily W. Hopkins. She was a descendant of George Ross, lieutenant governor of Pennsylvania. They had four children, Adam R. (died 1908), Rebecca (died 1865), Henry Stephen and Emily. His son Henry Stephen was a state examiner of banks in Montana.

In 1862, Magraw moved back to West Nottingham and purchased his family's old home in West Nottingham. He was a friend of James Buchanan. He was a member of the Presbyterian Church. On January 29, 1867, Magraw had a stroke. He died on February 1, 1867, in Washington, D.C. He was buried at West Nottingham Cemetery.
