= George P. Whitaker =

American politician and industrialist (1803–1890)

George Price Whitaker

Member of the Maryland House of Delegates from the Cecil County district
- In office 1867–1867 Serving with Alexander Evans, John Golibart, William Lindsey, Henry S. Magraw
- Preceded by: Jesse A. Kirk, James McCauley, Jethro J. McCullough, George B. Pennington
- Succeeded by: John Ward Davis, Levi R. Mearns, William Richards, James Touchstone

Personal details
- Born: December 1803 near Reading, Pennsylvania, U.S.
- Died: December 31, 1890 (aged 87) Cecil County, Maryland, U.S.
- Resting place: St. Mark's Protestant Episcopal Chapel near Perryville, Maryland, U.S.
- Party: National Union
- Spouses: Eliza Ann Simmons (died 1875): Mary Evans
- Children: 10, including Nelson E.
- Relatives: Joseph Whitaker (brother); Samuel W. Pennypacker (great nephew); John Waters (great-great-great-grandson)
- Occupation: Politician; manufacturer; businessman
- Known for: owner of the Principio and Durham Furnaces

George Price Whitaker (December 1803 – December 31, 1890) was an American politician and iron manufacturer of the Whitaker iron family from Maryland. He served as a member of the Maryland House of Delegates, representing Cecil County in 1867. He and his brother Joseph Whitaker owned various iron works in Maryland, Pennsylvania, and West Virginia, notably the Principio Furnace in Cecil County and the Durham Furnace in Bucks County, Pennsylvania.

== Early life ==
George Price Whitaker was born on December 30 or 31, 1803, near Reading, Pennsylvania, to Sarah (née Updegrove) and Joseph Whitaker of the Whitaker iron family. His father was a farmer. Whitaker attended local schools. He had limited education and worked on a farm until around the age of 19. He learned the business of iron manufacturing. In 1827, he moved to Maryland.

== Career ==
Whitaker worked as a workman at Delaware Iron Works in New Castle County, Delaware, for about two years. He moved to Philadelphia to study, but became sick. He then became a manager of the Gibraltar forges near Reading, Pennsylvania. He worked there about two years. In 1832, Whitaker and his brother Joseph bought Elk Rolling Mills near Big Elk Creek in Elkton. He later bought North East Rolling Mills in North East with the same partners. He worked there about seven years. In 1835, he sold North East Rolling Mills. That year he purchased the Principio Furnace along with 9,000 acres (3,600 ha) of timberland. The property had been abandoned since it was burned down by Admiral George Cockburn in the War of 1812. Their company manufactured pig iron there.

In 1845, he along with his brother Joseph, David Reeves and Joseph's son W. P. C. Whitaker built Havre de Grace Iron Works in Havre de Grace. Soon after Reeves retired and the business was run as Joseph & George P. Whitaker. In 1848, he along with partners purchased Durham Furnace in Bucks County, Pennsylvania. There they built two new furnaces. He also purchased an iron commission house in Philadelphia that year with his son-in-law Joseph Coudon under the firm Whitaker & Coudon. They operated the commission house until 1862. In 1855, Whitaker and his brother purchased an interest in the Crescent Iron Works in Wheeling, West Virginia. In 1861, at the outbreak of the Civil War, Whitaker dissolved the partnership with his brother, and he incorporated the company as George P. Whitaker Company. His brother took the properties in Pennsylvania and New Jersey and Whitaker took the properties in Delaware and Maryland. In that year, the Havre de Grace Iron Works were sold to McCullough Iron Company. In 1862, he sold out his portion of Durham Furnace to his brother Joseph. In 1863, Whitaker became the full owner of Crescent Iron Works. He ran it until 1868 when he sold it off. He purchased it again after the Panic of 1873 and ran it under the stock company The Whitaker Iron Company. He served as president of the company and his son Nelson E. served as secretary. Whitaker worked as the head of the company until his death.

He served as director of the Baltimore and Ohio Railroad. He owned over 6,000 acres (2,400 ha) in Cecil County, Maryland. He also owned the Phoenix Iron Works in Phoenixville, Pennsylvania.

Whitaker was a member of the National Union Party. He served as a member of the Maryland House of Delegates, representing Cecil County in 1867. He served with Alexander Evans, William Lindsey and Henry S. Magraw. The four delegates were known as "The Big Four" due to their physical size.

== Personal life ==
Whitaker married Eliza Ann Simmons. They had ten children, including Edmund S., Nelson E. and Caroline (married Joseph C. Naudaine). His wife died in 1875. He then married Mary Evans, widow of Amos A. Evans. He was vestryman of St. Ann's Episcopal Church. His great nephew was Pennsylvania governor Samuel W. Pennypacker.

Whitaker died on December 31, 1890, at Principio Furnace in Cecil County. He was buried at St. Mark's Protestant Episcopal Chapel near Perryville.

He is the great-great-great-grandfather of filmmaker John Waters.
