= Whitaker iron family =

American industrialist family

During the 19th and 20th centuries, several members of the Whitaker family and related families made important contributions to the American iron and steel industry.

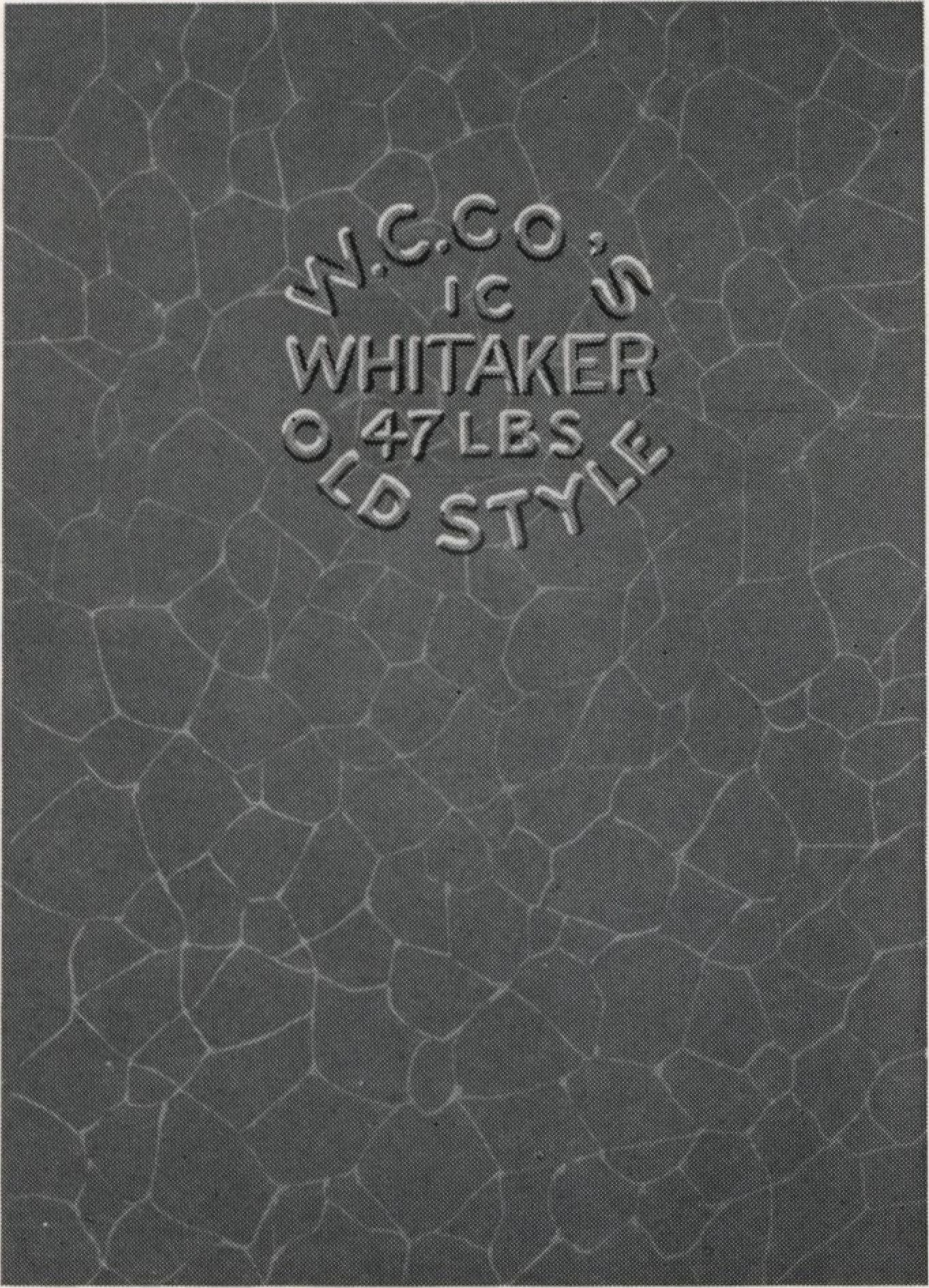
An image from a 1911 Wheeling Corrugating Company catalog

== First generation ==
- Joseph Whitaker I (1755–1838) was the son of a Leeds cloth manufacturer; he came to America as a British soldier during the American Revolution and deserted, settling in Pennsylvania near Hopewell Furnace. He was merely a woodcutter for the ironmakers, but four of his children became prominent ironmakers.

== Second generation ==
- James Whitaker (1782–1875) began producing nails in Philadelphia about 1805, and in 1816 he and his brother Joseph II leased a rolling mill at the Falls of the Schuylkill, the first of many investments in the iron trade. He was the managing partner at the Phoenix Iron Works for several years and later was active in family interests at Reading. In 1846 he returned to Philadelphia and mostly retired from iron work, although he remained an investor in several enterprises. He became a Quaker late in life.
- Joseph Whitaker II (1789–1870) was a prominent ironmaster, businessman, and politician. He was the ironmaster at the Phoenix Iron Works, the Principio Furnace, and owned parts of these businesses and others, along with others of his family.

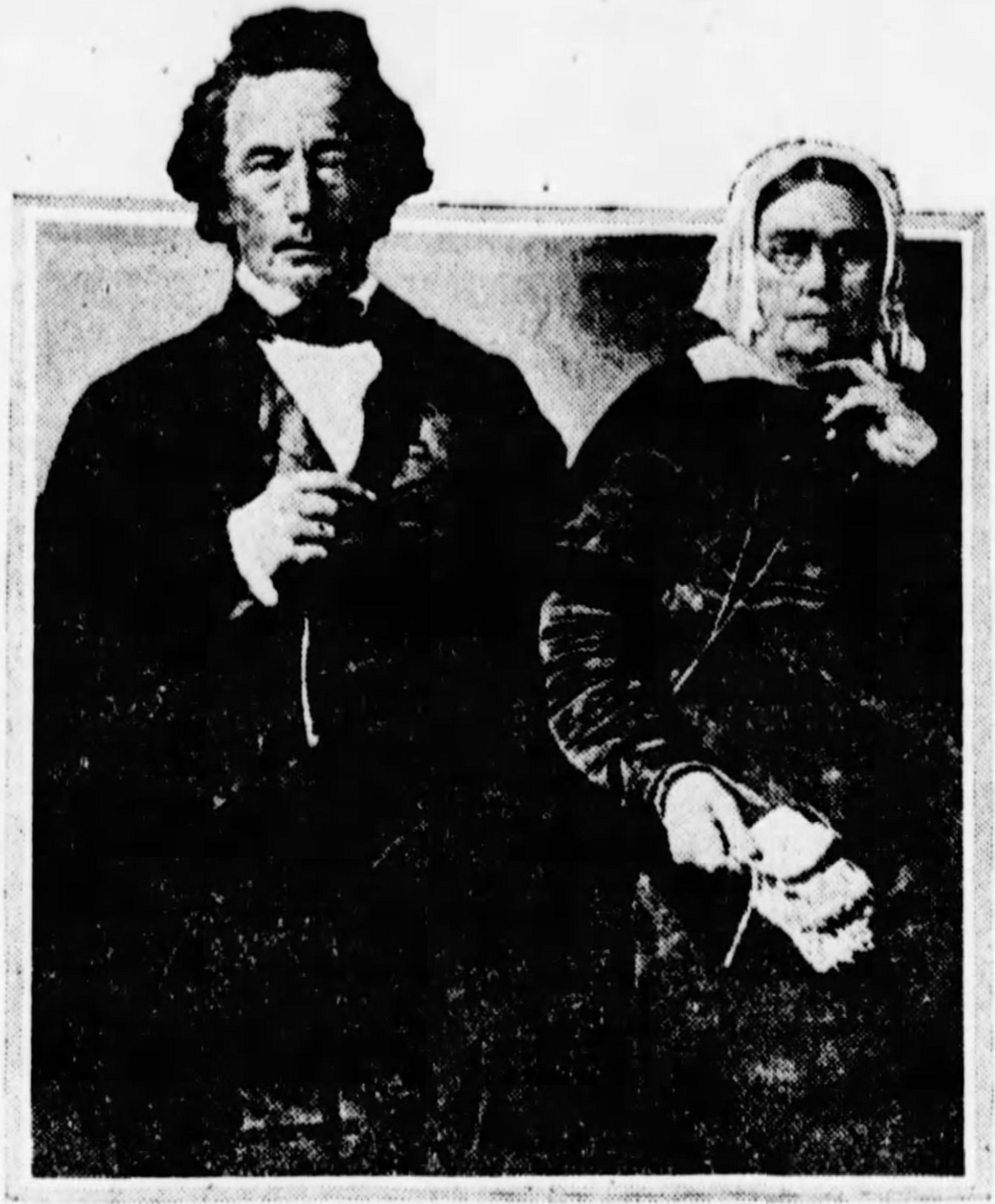
Drawing of Joseph Whitaker II and his wife Grace in a 1917 newspaper

- Francis A. Whitaker (1799–1876), brother of Joseph Whitaker II, was also an ironmaster. He operated the Matilda Furnace, Mifflin County, Pennsylvania in 1848-9, and also operated the Elk Iron Works near Elkton, Maryland.
- George Price Whitaker (1803–1890), brother of Joseph Whitaker II, was his partner in most of his enterprises. He received his early training at an iron works in New Castle County, Delaware and also saved enough money to receive some formal education in Philadelphia. He went on to manage a forge near Reading, Pennsylvania. His first investments were in a rolling mill near Elkton, Maryland and (with his brother James) a forge in North East, Maryland, which he managed for seven years. In 1836 George and his brother Joseph Whitaker II purchased the Principio Furnace and related properties, which had been in ruins since being burned during the War of 1812, and rebuilt. In 1845 George, Joseph, W. P. C. Whitaker and a partner built an ironworks at Havre de Grace, Maryland. In 1848 George, Joseph, and partners purchased the old Durham Furnace (once run by George Taylor, a signer of the Declaration of Independence) in Durham Township, Pennsylvania and revived it. In 1855 George and Joseph purchased an interest in the Crescent Iron Works in Wheeling in what was then Virginia. At the beginning of the Civil War George and Joseph divided their properties, George receiving the Maryland and Virginia share, Joseph the Pennsylvania holdings. In 1863 George purchased the Crescent ironworks outright and ran it until 1868, when it was bought by others. George repurchased the works after the owners went bankrupt and created the "Whitaker Iron Company", with George as president and his son Nelson E. Whitaker as secretary. George P. Whitaker served one term in the Maryland legislature, in 1867, and also represented Maryland on the board of the Baltimore and Ohio Railroad.

== Third generation ==
- William P. C. Whitaker (1812–1888), eldest son of Joseph Whitaker II, helped run the family furnaces at Principio and erected new ones at Havre de Grace, Maryland.
- Joseph Coudon (III) (1823–1880), a member of a wealthy Maryland family (owner of the estate Woodlands), married Caroline Whitaker (1833-1898), daughter of George Price Whitaker, in 1854. He became a partner in Whitaker & Coudon, which sold iron products from the family furnaces and elsewhere in Philadelphia.
- Joseph Rusling Whitaker (1824–1895), son of Joseph Whitaker II, helped his brother William erect ironworks at Havre de Grace, Maryland in 1845 and became for ten years the family's manager at the Durham Iron Works after his father and uncle purchased it in 1848. He was later president of the Swede Iron Company and made lucrative investments in street railways in Philadelphia. In 1878 he moved to Delaware and was a delegate to the national Republican convention of 1888.
- George W. Whitaker (1826–1891), son of Joseph Whitaker II, served as president of the Saucon Iron Company in Hellertown, Pennsylvania, in which he and his brother Joseph R. Whitaker had shares.
- William H. Whitaker (1835–1920), son of Francis A. Whitaker, was a president and owner of the Philadelphia Athletics baseball team of 1882–1890.
- Nelson Evans Whitaker (1839–1909) was the son of George Price Whitaker and inherited a share of his iron and steel interests in West Virginia and Maryland. He ran the businesses successfully and became a politician in West Virginia as well, serving as president of the state senate 1897–99.
- Edmund Simmons Whitaker (1838–1898) was another son of George Price Whitaker. He managed the Durham Iron Works in Bucks County, Pennsylvania and the Principio Furnace for many years.

== Fourth generation ==
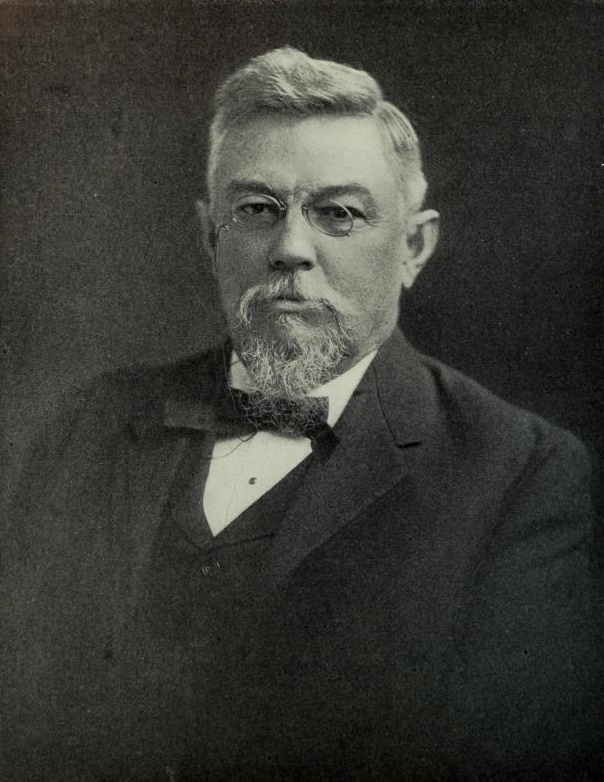
Samuel W. Pennypacker, 1905

- Samuel Whitaker Pennypacker (1843–1916) was a grandson of Joseph Whitaker II; he was a judge, historian, and governor of Pennsylvania. As a young man he worked at the firm of Whitaker & Coudon, iron merchants, in Philadelphia, which sold iron from the family ironworks and other furnaces.
- Joseph Coudon (IV) (1858–1940), grandson of George Price Whitaker, was one of the executors of George Price Whitaker's will, and helped to defend the actions of the executors from legal challenges by some of the other members of the family. He had large land holdings in Cecil County, Maryland, was the president of several banks there, and was a director of the Wheeling Steel Company at his death.
- Alexander Glass (1858–1941) was a son-in-law of Nelson E. Whitaker. After working for both the LaBelle Iron Works in Steubenville, Ohio (which his father Andrew Glass had helped found) and Whitaker family steel plants, he started the Wheeling Corrugating Company, with the help of an investment from his father-in-law. It was the first firm in Wheeling to make zinc-coated steel, corrugated for strength, for building, and it was a success. In 1919 Glass' company, the La Belle Iron Works, the Whitaker-Glessner Company (which bought the Portsmouth Steel Company), and the Wheeling Steel and Iron Company combined to form the Wheeling Steel Corporation, which Glass later led until his death in 1941. Wheeling Steel merged with Pittsburgh Steel to form Wheeling-Pittsburgh Steel in 1968. Glass incidentally made Wheeling, West Virginia famous by placing a large red "Wheeling" label on the company's garbage pails, which were widely used.
- Joseph Whitaker Thompson (1861-1946) was a grandson of Joseph Whitaker II through his daughter Gertrude. He was a federal judge at the district and circuit levels.
- Albert C. Whitaker (1867–1951) was a son of Nelson E. Whitaker; he served as president of the Whitaker Iron Company, the Wheeling Corrugating Company, and the Riverside Bridge Company. He mostly retired from business in 1921, but continued to serve on the board of directors of Wheeling Steel until at least 1929.
- Nelson Price Whitaker (1873–1922) was a grandson of George Price Whitaker (through his son Cecil, who predeceased him). He helped manage the family businesses, serving in 1910 as the general manager of the Whitaker-Glessner Company, Wheeling Corrugating Company, and the Portsmouth Steel Company. He was elected to the West Virginia House of Delegates in 1916, and was chairman of the state Highway Commission until shortly before his death.
- Dwight Homans Wagner (1874–1958) married Eliza "Elsie" Whitaker (1874–1931), daughter of Nelson E. Whitaker. Trained as an architect at Cornell, Wagner was put to work running the family enterprises, serving as an officer in various Whitaker companies and running his own business manufacturing concrete blocks, bridge piers, and other forms. He eventually served as president of Alexander Glass' Wheeling Corrugating Company, by then a subsidiary of the Whitaker-Glessner Company.

== Fifth generation ==
- Andrew Glass (1881–1925) was a nephew of Alexander Glass. He started as a salesman for his uncle's Wheeling Corrugating Company, managed the Portsmouth, Ohio ironworks of the Whitaker-Glessner Company, and later served as president of the Whitaker-Glessner Company and vice-president of the Wheeling Steel Company (after their consolidation). He died of an illness at the age of 44.
- William Warfield Holloway (1886–1969) married Alexander Glass' daughter Margaret Louise Glass (1886–1980). Son of Wheeling businessman Jacob James Holloway, W. W. Holloway earned an engineering degree at Yale in 1907 and by 1909 was working at the Glasses' Labelle Iron Works. After his marriage in 1911 he went to work at his father-in-law's company, Wheeling Corrugated, initially in advertising. In 1927 he was made president of the Wheeling Steel Company, in 1930 chairman of the executive board. He was also active in steel industry organizations, serving for instance on the executive committee of the American Iron and Steel Institute from 1931 to 1958.
- George Parks Whitaker (1891–1948) was the son of Albert C. Whitaker. A Princeton University graduate, he helped run some of the Whitaker family enterprises, serving as secretary/treasurer of the Whitaker Iron Company, assistant treasurer of the Whitaker-Glessner Company, and assistant treasurer of the Wheeling Corrugating Company.

== Sixth generation ==
- George Parks Whitaker Jr. (1922–2003) was the son of George Parks Whitaker. He served in the Army Air Force (Air Medal, Distinguished Flying Cross) during World War II, graduated from Kenyon College, and traveled around Europe, meeting his future wife Anita Malmstrom while working at the Sandvik Steel Works in Sweden. He returned to Wheeling to join the Wheeling Steel company and retired after 25 years as the General Manager of the Ohio Valley Division of Wheeling-Pittsburgh Steel. He then became president of the Wheeling Stamping Company, a manufacturer of tubes.
