= Alexander Evans (American politician) =

American politician (1818–1888)

Member of the Maryland House of Delegates from the Cecil County district
- In office 1867–1867 Serving with John Golibart, William Lindsey, Henry S. Magraw, George P. Whitaker
- Preceded by: Jesse A. Kirk, James McCauley, Jethro J. McCullough, George B. Pennington
- Succeeded by: John Ward Davis, Levi R. Mearns, William Richards, James Touchstone

Member of the U.S. House of Representatives from Maryland's 5th district
- In office March 4, 1847 – March 3, 1853
- Preceded by: Albert Constable
- Succeeded by: Henry May

Personal details
- Born: September 13, 1818 Elkton, Maryland, U.S.
- Died: December 5, 1888 (aged 70) Elkton, Maryland, U.S.
- Resting place: Elkton Presbyterian Cemetery
- Party: Whig; Democratic
- Spouse: Mary Manly
- Children: 1

Alexander Evans (September 13, 1818 – December 5, 1888) was an American politician from Maryland. He served as a U.S. representative from Maryland from 1847 to 1853. He served as a member of the Maryland House of Delegates, representing Cecil County in 1867.

== Early life ==
Alexander Evans was born on September 13, 1818, in Elkton, Maryland, to Mary (née Oliver) and Amos Alexander Evans. His father worked as a medical doctor in Elkton. Evans attended the public schools and the local academy at Elkton. He later studied law. He was admitted to the bar in 1845 and commenced practice in his native city.

== Career ==
Evans was a civil engineer's assistant and was appointed the chief engineer of the Annapolis and Elk Ridge Railroad.

Evans was elected as a Whig to the Thirtieth, defeating Richard Carmichael. He then went on to serve in the Thirty-first, and Thirty-second Congresses; serving from March 4, 1847 – March 3, 1853.

Evans was elected to the Maryland House of Delegates in 1866 under a Democratic ticket. He served in 1867. While a delegate, he was involved in arranging the 1867 Maryland Constitution.

He engaged in the practice of law until his death.

== Personal life ==
Evans was married to Mary Manly. Together, they had one child, Alexander Evans Jr. He was the nephew of Levi Hollingsworth Evans, a Maryland state senator and Cecil County judge. His brother was Colonel Andrew Wallace Evans.

Evans died in Elkton, Maryland, on December 5, 1888. He is interred in Elkton Presbyterian Cemetery.

U.S. House of Representatives
Preceded by Albert Constable	Member of the U.S. House of Representatives from Maryland's 5th congressional district 1847–1853	Succeeded by Henry May
