= Nelson E. Whitaker =

American businessman and politician

- Born: November 9, 1839; Principio, Maryland, U.S.
- Died: December 28, 1909 (aged 70); Wheeling, West Virginia, U.S.
- Occupations: Businessman; politician
- Spouse: Sallie F. Roberts
- Children: 4

Nelson Evans Whitaker (November 9, 1839 - December 28, 1909) was an American businessman and politician, principally in the state of West Virginia.

Whitaker came from a family of ironmakers, beginning with his grandfather Joseph Whitaker and his uncle Joseph Whitaker II. His father George P. Whitaker owned the Whitaker Iron Company and related enterprises. Nelson E. Whitaker was president of the Principio Forge Company, Whitaker-Glessner Company, and many other businesses. The Whitaker iron and steel holdings eventually became an important part of the Wheeling Steel Company, which after a merger in 1968 became Wheeling-Pittsburgh Steel. Whitaker's nephew Alexander Glass was the president of Wheeling Steel until 1941.

Whitaker's businesses and others came together in 1887 to launch "The Ohio Valley Manufacturer", a trade newspaper; Whitaker was the first president of the publishing company.

Whitaker was the Republican President of the West Virginia Senate from Ohio County and served from 1897 to 1899. He served in the West Virginia Senate from 1891 to 1902. He also served one term in the West Virginia House of Delegates (1887-8).

Whitaker married Sallie F. Roberts in 1864; they had at least four children - Sallie, Albert, Henry, and Eliza.

Political offices
Preceded by William G. Worley	President of the WV Senate; 1897–1899	Succeeded by Oliver S. Marshall
