= Durham Mill and Furnace =

- U.S. National Register of Historic Places
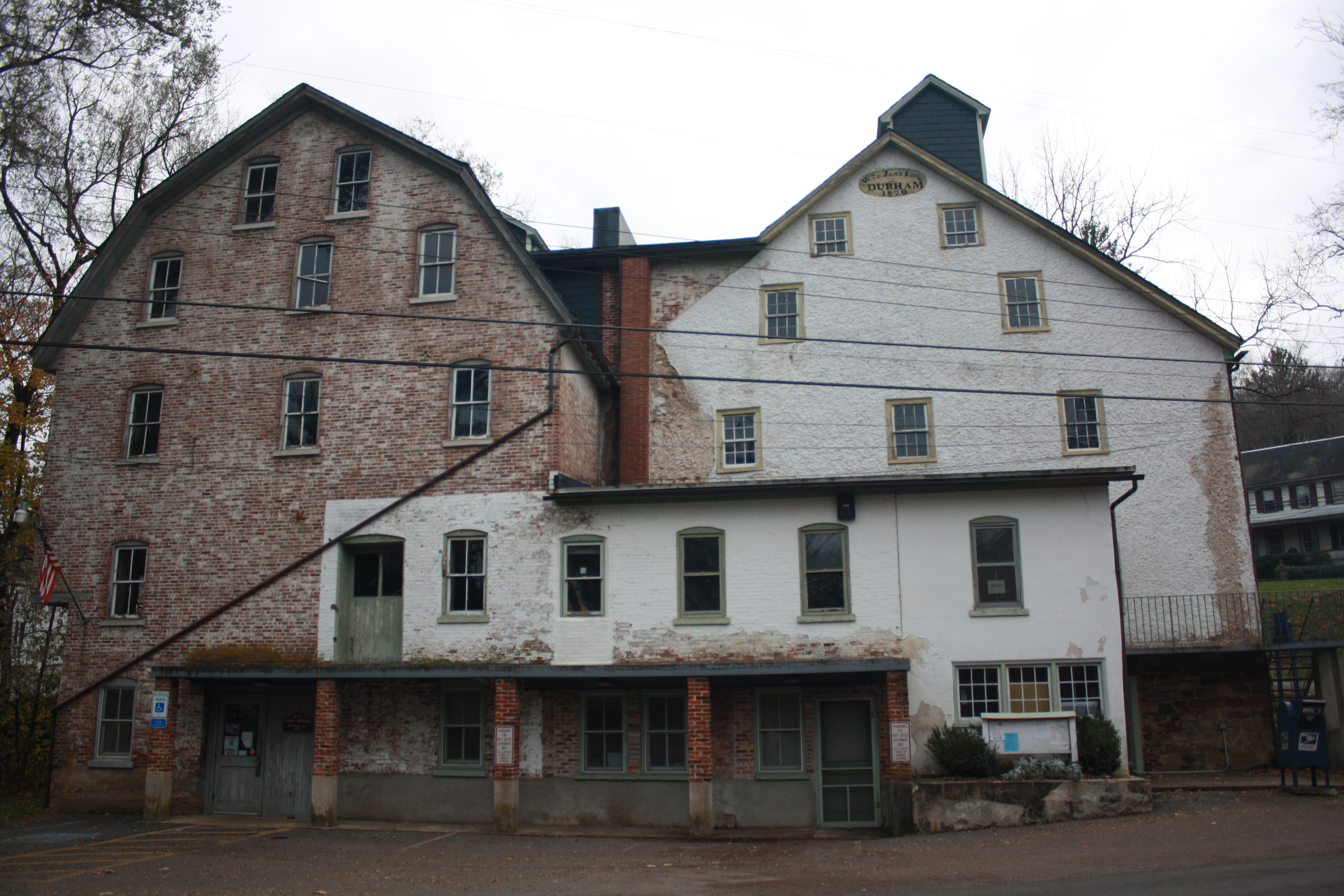
- Durham Mill (Durham Post Office). November 2012.

- Location within Pennsylvania Location within the United States
- Location: Durham Rd., Durham Township, Pennsylvania.
- Coordinates: 40°34′34.9″N 75°13′25.6″W
- Area: 3.5 acres (1.4 ha)
- Built: 1727, 1820
- NRHP reference No.: 76001608
- Added to NRHP: November 21, 1976

Durham Mill and Furnace is a historic grist mill located in Durham Township in Bucks County, Pennsylvania. The mill was built in 1820, on the foundations of Durham Furnace. The furnace was built in 1727 and remained in operation for 70 years.

The furnace produced pig and bar iron and during the American Revolution cannons, ballshot, and other military equipment. One of its managers was Col. George Taylor (c. 1716–1781), a signer of the Declaration of Independence. The mill building is a three-story, stone structure with the overshot wheel located inside. Attached to it is a large, brick gambrel roofed warehouse added in 1912. At that time, the post office opened at the mill, the second oldest post office in the United States; the Durham Post Office was founded in 1723. The furnace was owned by George P. Whitaker and Joseph Whitaker in the mid-19th century. The mill was owned by Congressman Reuben Knecht Bachman (1834–1911) in the late-19th and early-20th century. The mill remained in commercial operation until 1967.

It was added to the National Register of Historic Places in 1976. See Benjamin F. Fackenthal, The Durham Iron Works: Durham Township, Bucks County, Pennsylvania read at a meeting of the Friends Historical Association of Philadelphia, 10 June 1922 (Holicong, PA: Buckingham Friends Meeting House, 1937).

== Gallery ==
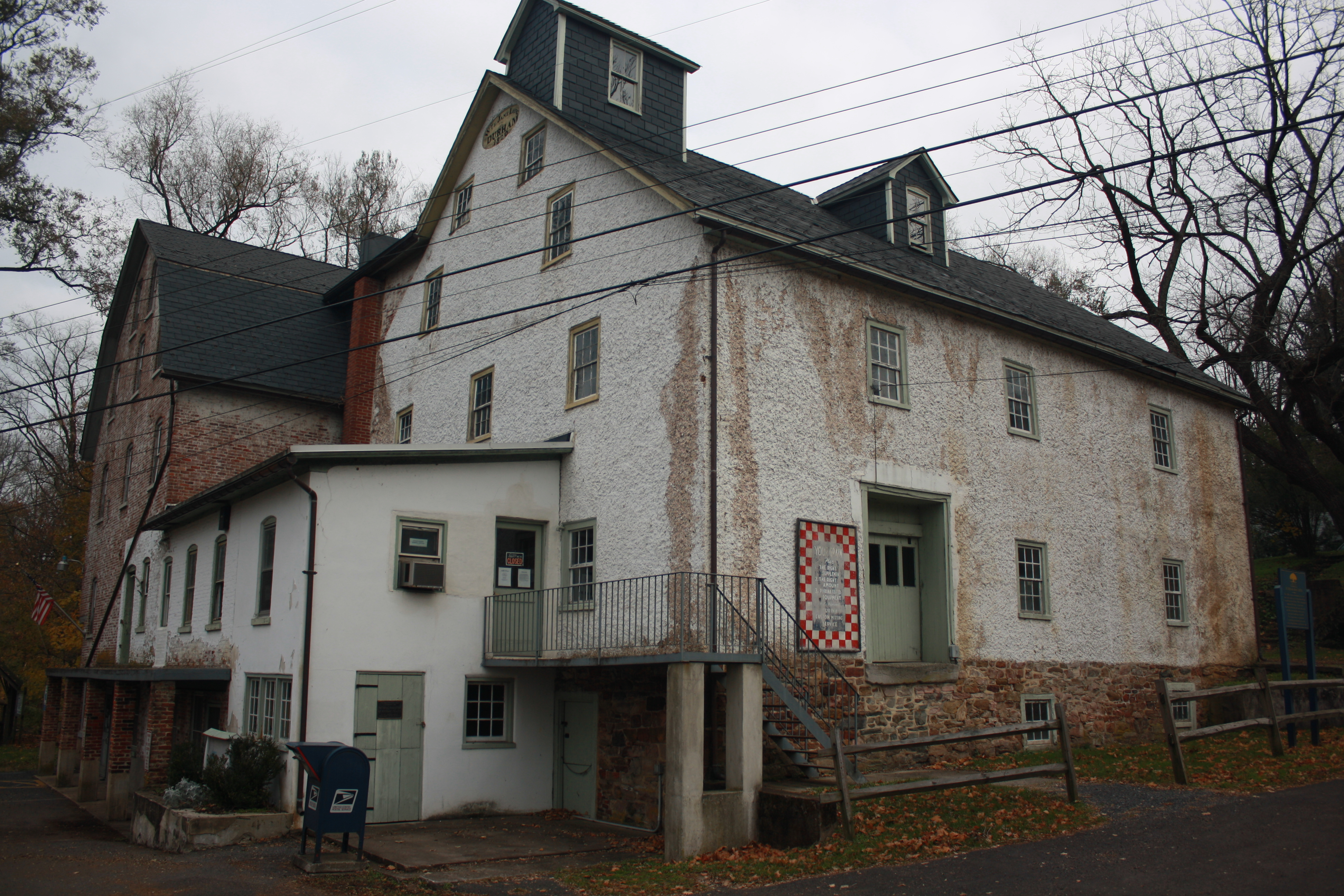
Durham Mill, side view

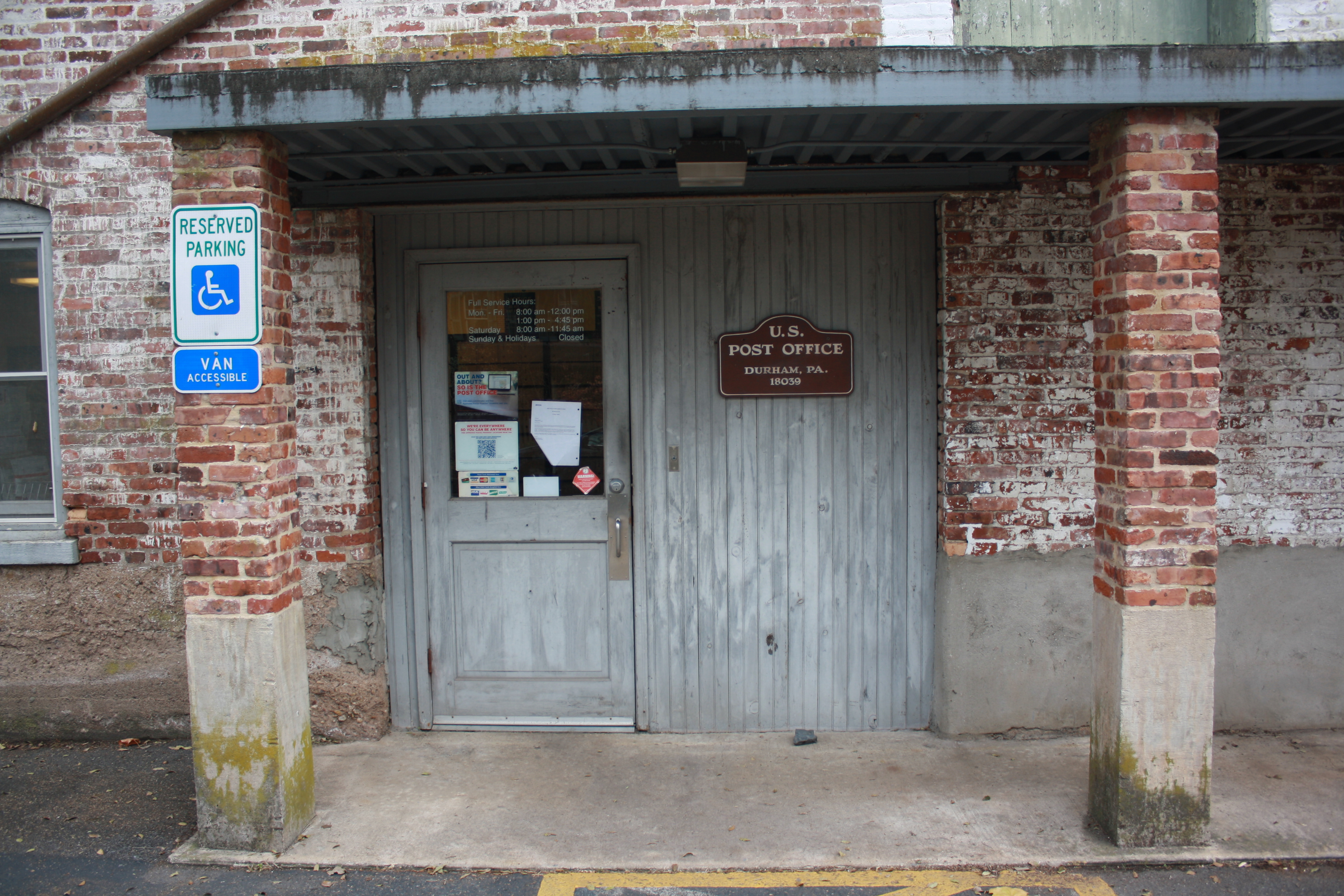
Durham Mill, main door.

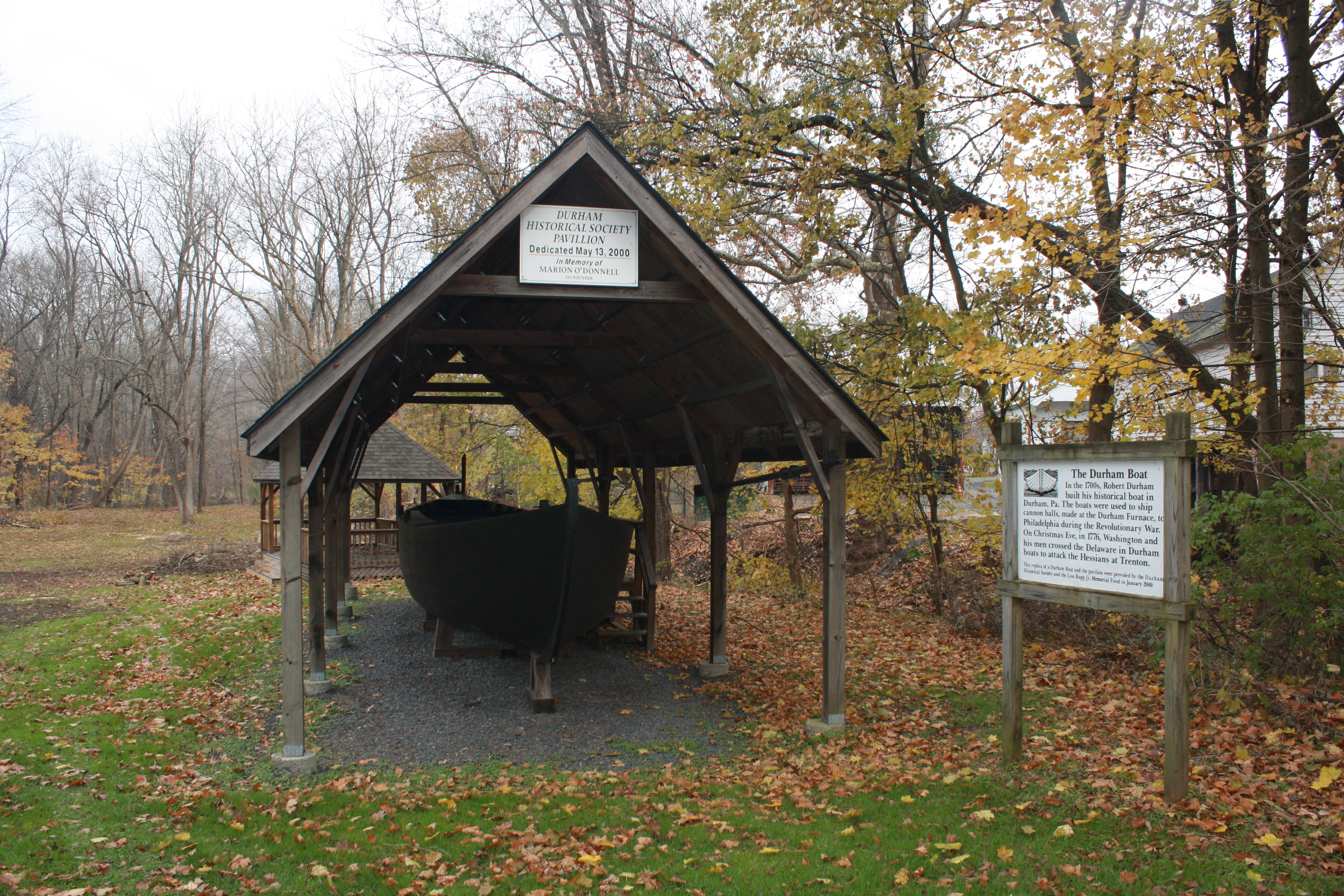
Durham Boat.

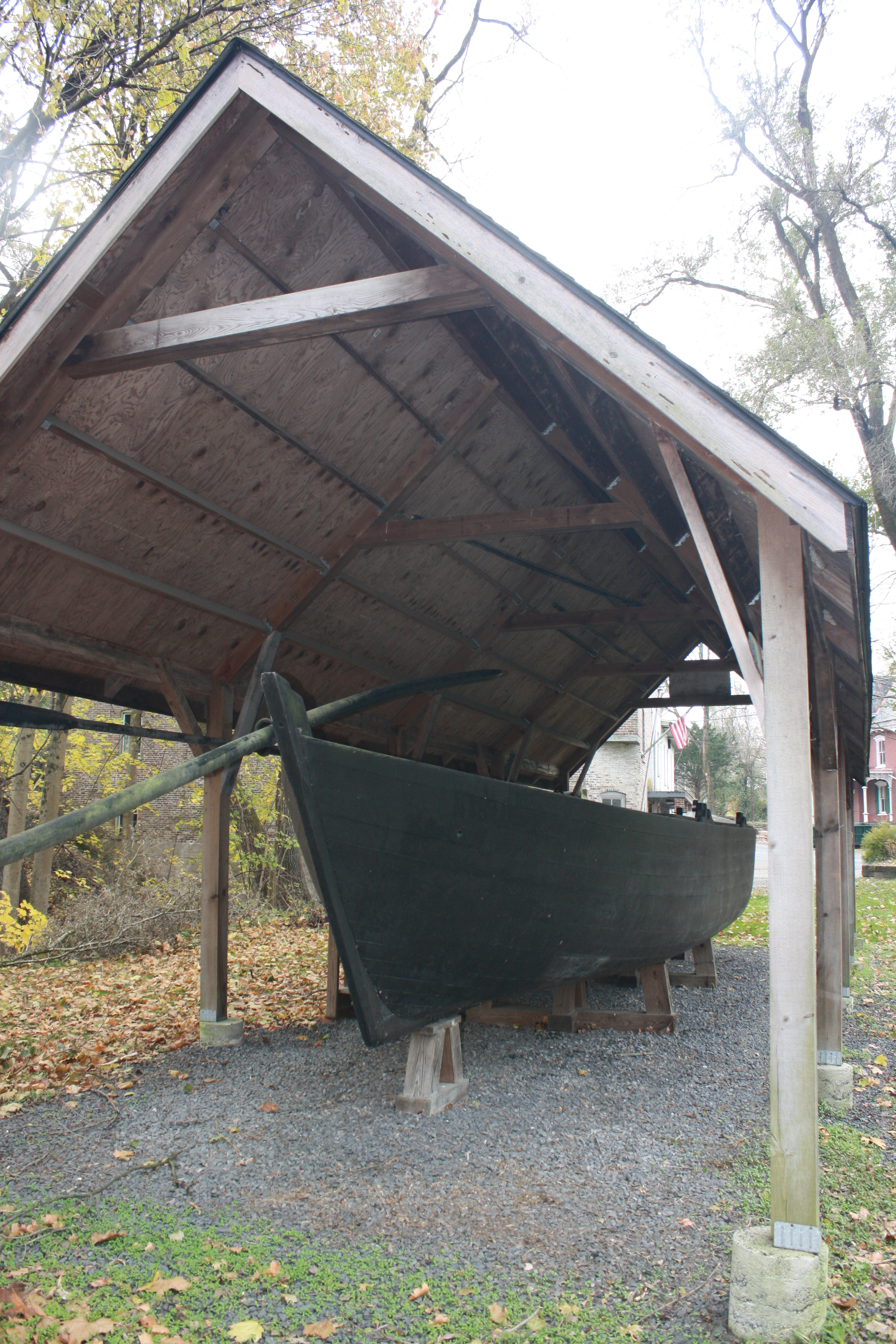
Durham Boat, rear view.
