= Senator Whitaker =

Senator Whitaker may refer to:

- Nelson E. Whitaker (1839–1909), West Virginia State Senate
- Ruth Whitaker (1936–2014), Arkansas State Senate
