= Woodlands (Perryville, Maryland) =

Historic house in Maryland, United States

- U.S. National Register of Historic Places
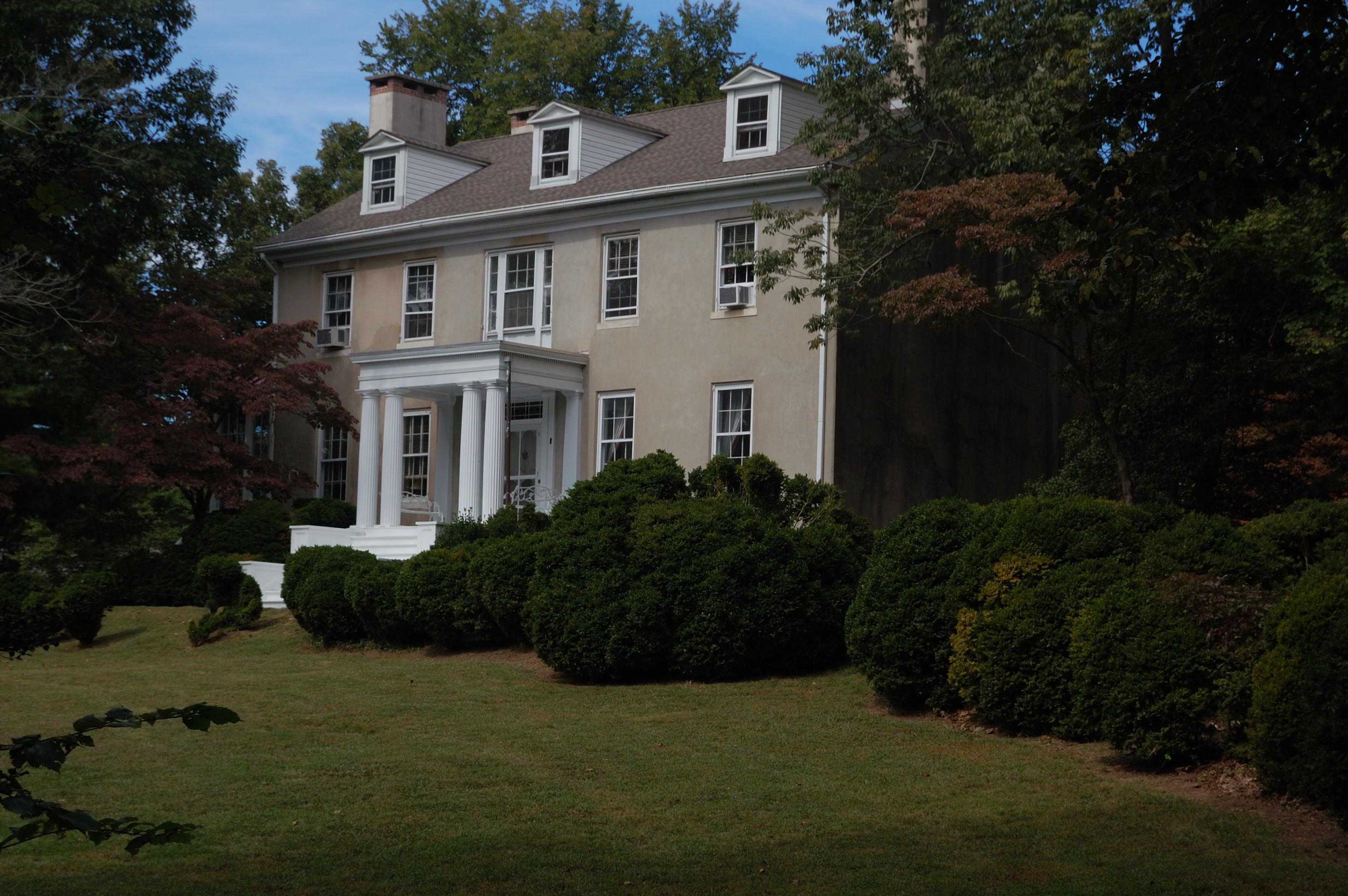

- Location within Maryland Location within the United States
- Location: 93 Millcreek Lane, Perryville, Maryland
- Coordinates: 39°34′12″N 76°3′27″W
- Area: 96 acres (39 ha)
- Built: 1810
- Architectural style: Greek Revival
- NRHP reference No.: 79003274
- Added to NRHP: September 24, 1979

Woodlands is a historic home located at Perryville, Cecil County, Maryland, United States. It appears to have been constructed in two principal periods: the original 2 1/2-story section built between 1810 and 1820 of stuccoed stone and a 1 1/2-story rear kitchen wing; and two bays of stuccoed brick, with double parlors on the first story, and a one-story, glazed conservatory constructed between 1840 and 1850. The home features Greek Revival details. Also on the property are a 2-story stone smokehouse and tenant house, a small frame barn and corn house, a square frame privy with pyramidal roof, a carriage house, frame garage, and a large frame bank barn.

Woodlands was listed on the National Register of Historic Places in 1979.

Significance: Woodlands is the estate and ancestral home of the Coudon family. The main dwelling house and adjoining outbuildings are situated on a hill overlooking the headwaters of the Chesapeake Bay. The house has lovely grounds, with landscaped gardens, boxwoods, and several old trees of merit. The mansion is one of the most important 19th century buildings in Cecil County. The house has endured moderate alterations, but still portrays pre-Civil War times more like the antebellum South than a border state. The Greek Revival period of the house is without equal in Cecil County. Another important feature of the property is the large number of original outbuildings still intact and continuing to perform as part of a working farm. The Coudon family has been an important family in Cecil County, particularly in the field of religion. The Reverend Joseph Coudon, father of the first Coudon to own Woodlands, served as rector to St. Mary Anne's Church in nearby North East, Maryland, from 1787 to 1792. The family has continued to worship at and support this church through the years. Joseph Coudon, Jr.'s son married the daughter of George P. Whitaker, owner of Principio Furnace, which created early ties between the two historic properties. Due to the long occupancy of Woodlands, a large amount of furniture and artwork have accumulated within the house.
