= Judge McPherson =

Judge McPherson may refer to:

- John Bayard McPherson (1846–1919), judge of the United States Court of Appeals for the Third Circuit
- Smith McPherson (1848–1915), judge of the United States District Court for the Southern District of Iowa
