= Joseph Whitaker Thompson =

American judge (1861–1946)

Senior Judge of the United States Court of Appeals for the Third Circuit
- In office May 1, 1938 – January 7, 1946

Judge of the United States Court of Appeals for the Third Circuit
- In office January 29, 1931 – May 1, 1938
- Appointed by: Herbert Hoover
- Preceded by: Seat established by 46 Stat. 538
- Succeeded by: William Clark

Judge of the United States District Court for the Eastern District of Pennsylvania
- In office July 16, 1912 – February 3, 1931
- Appointed by: William Howard Taft
- Preceded by: John Bayard McPherson
- Succeeded by: George Austin Welsh

Personal details
- Born: Joseph Whitaker Thompson; August 19, 1861 Stroudsburg, Pennsylvania, U.S.
- Died: January 7, 1946 (aged 84)
- Education: University of Pennsylvania Law School (LLB)

Joseph Whitaker Thompson (August 19, 1861 – January 7, 1946) was a United States circuit judge of the United States Court of Appeals for the Third Circuit and previously was a United States district judge of the United States District Court for the Eastern District of Pennsylvania.

== Family and early life ==
Thompson was the son of the Rev. Charles Impey Thompson (1819-1883) and Gertrude Whitaker Thompson (1830-1914). Gertrude was the daughter of Joseph Whitaker II, a member of the prosperous Whitaker iron family. Thompson was a younger cousin of Samuel Whitaker Pennypacker (1843-1916), historian, judge, and governor of Pennsylvania, and studied law with him.

Born in Stroudsburg, Pennsylvania, Thompson graduated from the University of Pennsylvania Law School with a Bachelor of Laws in 1887. He was an Assistant United States Attorney for the Eastern District of Pennsylvania from 1900 to 1904, and then the United States Attorney for that district until 1912.

== Federal judicial service ==
Thompson was nominated by President William Howard Taft on June 5, 1912, to a seat on the United States District Court for the Eastern District of Pennsylvania vacated by Judge John Bayard McPherson. He was confirmed by the United States Senate on June 16, 1912, and received his commission on July 16, 1912. His service terminated on February 3, 1931, due to his elevation to the Third Circuit.

Thompson was nominated by President Herbert Hoover on December 4, 1930, to the United States Court of Appeals for the Third Circuit, to a new seat authorized by 46 Stat. 538. He was confirmed by the Senate on January 22, 1931, and received his commission on January 29, 1931. He assumed senior status on May 1, 1938. His service terminated on January 7, 1946, due to his death.

== Sources ==
Legal offices
Preceded by John Bayard McPherson	Judge of the United States District Court for the Eastern District of Pennsylvania; 1912–1931	Succeeded by George Austin Welsh
Preceded by Seat established by 46 Stat. 538	Judge of the United States Court of Appeals for the Third Circuit; 1931–1938	Succeeded by William Clark
