= James K. Moorhead =

American politician (1806–1884)

James Kennedy Moorhead
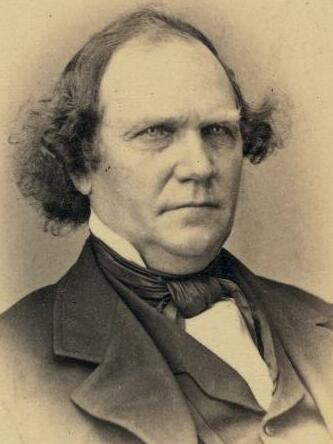

Member of the U.S. House of Representatives from Pennsylvania
- In office March 4, 1859 – March 3, 1869
- Preceded by: David Ritchie (21st); Robert McKnight (22nd)
- Succeeded by: John L. Dawson (21st); James S. Negley (22nd)
- Constituency: 21st district (1859-63); 22nd district (1863-69)

Personal details
- Born: September 7, 1806 Halifax, Pennsylvania, US
- Died: March 6, 1884 (aged 77) Pittsburgh, Pennsylvania, US
- Resting place: Allegheny Cemetery
- Party: Republican
- Other political affiliations: Democratic, Know Nothing
- Profession: Politician, Canal Executive

James Kennedy Moorhead (September 7, 1806 – March 6, 1884) was a Republican member of the U.S. House of Representatives from Pennsylvania.

== Biography ==
James K. Moorhead was born in Halifax, Pennsylvania. He served an apprenticeship at the tanner's trade, after which he became a canal contractor. He was superintendent and supervisor on the Juniata Canal in 1828, and projected and established the first passenger packet line on the Pennsylvania Canal in 1835.

In 1838 he was appointed adjutant general of Pennsylvania. He constructed the Monongahela Navigation Canal and was president of the company for twenty-one years. He was president of the Atlantic & Ohio Telegraph Co., which later became the Western Union Telegraph Company.

In his early political career he was a Democrat, but defected to the Know Nothings shortly after the fall elections of 1854.

He was elected as a Republican to the 36th Congress and to the four succeeding Congresses. In Congress he served as chairman to Committee on Manufactures during the 38th and 39th Congresses.

On March 31, 1868, he testified in the impeachment trial of President Andrew Johnson, having been called as a witness by the prosecution.

He declined to be a candidate for renomination in 1868. He was a delegate to the Republican National Convention in 1868, and an unsuccessful candidate for election to the United States Senate in 1880.

James K. Moorhead was the father of Pittsburgh financier Maxwell K. Moorhead, a member of the elite South Fork Fishing and Hunting Club of Johnstown Flood fame.

He was president of the chamber of commerce of Pittsburgh from 1877 until his death in 1884, aged 77.

U.S. House of Representatives
Preceded by David Ritchie	Member of the U.S. House of Representatives from Pennsylvania's 21st congressional district March 4, 1859 – March 3, 1863	Succeeded by John L. Dawson
Preceded by Robert McKnight	Member of the U.S. House of Representatives from Pennsylvania's 22nd congressional district March 4, 1863 – March 3, 1869	Succeeded by James S. Negley
