= William Butler (judge) =

American judge (1822–1909)

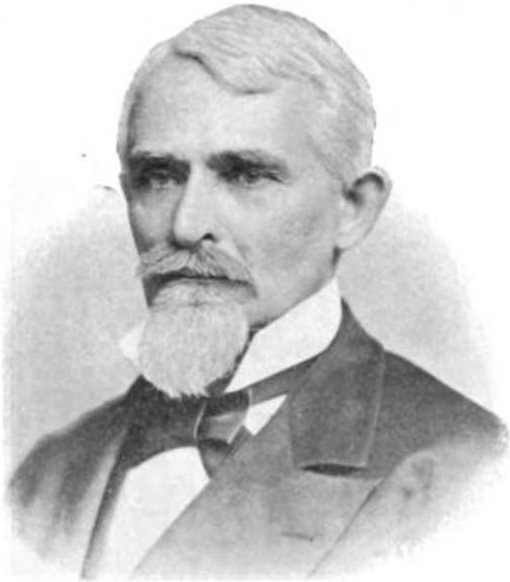
- Butler in a 1899 publication

Judge of the United States District Court for the Eastern District of Pennsylvania
- In office February 19, 1879 – January 31, 1899
- Appointed by: Rutherford B. Hayes
- Preceded by: John Cadwalader
- Succeeded by: John Bayard McPherson

Personal details
- Born: William Butler; December 2, 1822; Upper Uwchlan Township, Pennsylvania, U.S.
- Died: November 2, 1909 (aged 86); Chester County, Pennsylvania, U.S.
- Resting place: Oaklands Cemetery
- Education: read law

William Butler (December 2, 1822 – November 2, 1909) was a United States district judge of the United States District Court for the Eastern District of Pennsylvania.

== Education and career ==
William Butler was born on December 2, 1822, in Upper Uwchlan Township, Pennsylvania. He read law and was admitted to the bar on December 14, 1845. He was in private practice in West Chester, Pennsylvania and was district attorney of Harrisburg, Pennsylvania from 1856 to 1859. He was presiding judge of the Court of Common Pleas in Harrisburg from October 8, 1861, to his resignation on February 17, 1879, whereupon he was succeeded by West Chester attorney and historian J. Smith Futhey.

== Federal judicial service ==
On February 12, 1879, Butler was nominated by President Rutherford B. Hayes to a seat on the United States District Court for the Eastern District of Pennsylvania vacated by Judge John Cadwalader. Butler was confirmed by the United States Senate on February 19, 1879, and received his commission the same day. Butler served in that capacity until his retirement from the bench on January 31, 1899.

== Death ==
His son William Butler Jr. was also a judge.

Butler died on November 2, 1909, in Chester County. He was interred at Oaklands Cemetery in West Chester.

His younger brother was Samuel Butler, who served as a Pennsylvania state representative and state treasurer.

Legal offices
Preceded by John Cadwalader	Judge of the United States District Court for the Eastern District of Pennsylvania; 1879–1899	Succeeded by John Bayard McPherson
