= William H. Rease =

William H. Rease (1818–1893) was an American lithographer. He has been described as "the most prolific lithographer...during the 1840s and 1850s."

== Biography ==
William H. Rease was born in Pennsylvania in 1818. Throughout his career, he lived in both North Philadelphia and Fairmount.

Rease became active in the trade of lithography and advertising prints c. 1844. Throughout the 1850s, he primarily worked with printers Frederick Kuhl and Wagner & McGuigan. His work focused on advertising materials, and he was known for his portray of human details. During his career Rease often collaborated with other lithographers.

By 1850, Rease promoted his own business, which was located at 17 South Fifth Street, above Chestnut Street. Rease advertising his lithographs of "foundries, factories, stores, machinery, portraits, landscapes, architectural drawings etc." From c. 1853 to 1855, Rease worked in partnership with illustrator and lithographer Francis H. Schell.

In 1855, Rease relocated his business to the "northeast corner of Fourth and Chestnut streets." Rease offered not just advertising prints, but also "certificates, views, maps, and maritime prints". From 1856 to 1861, Rease partnered with Henry W. Scattergood, forming another store front. In 1861, Rease advertised lithographs of the USS Hartford.

Rease died on April 26, 1893.

== Gallery ==
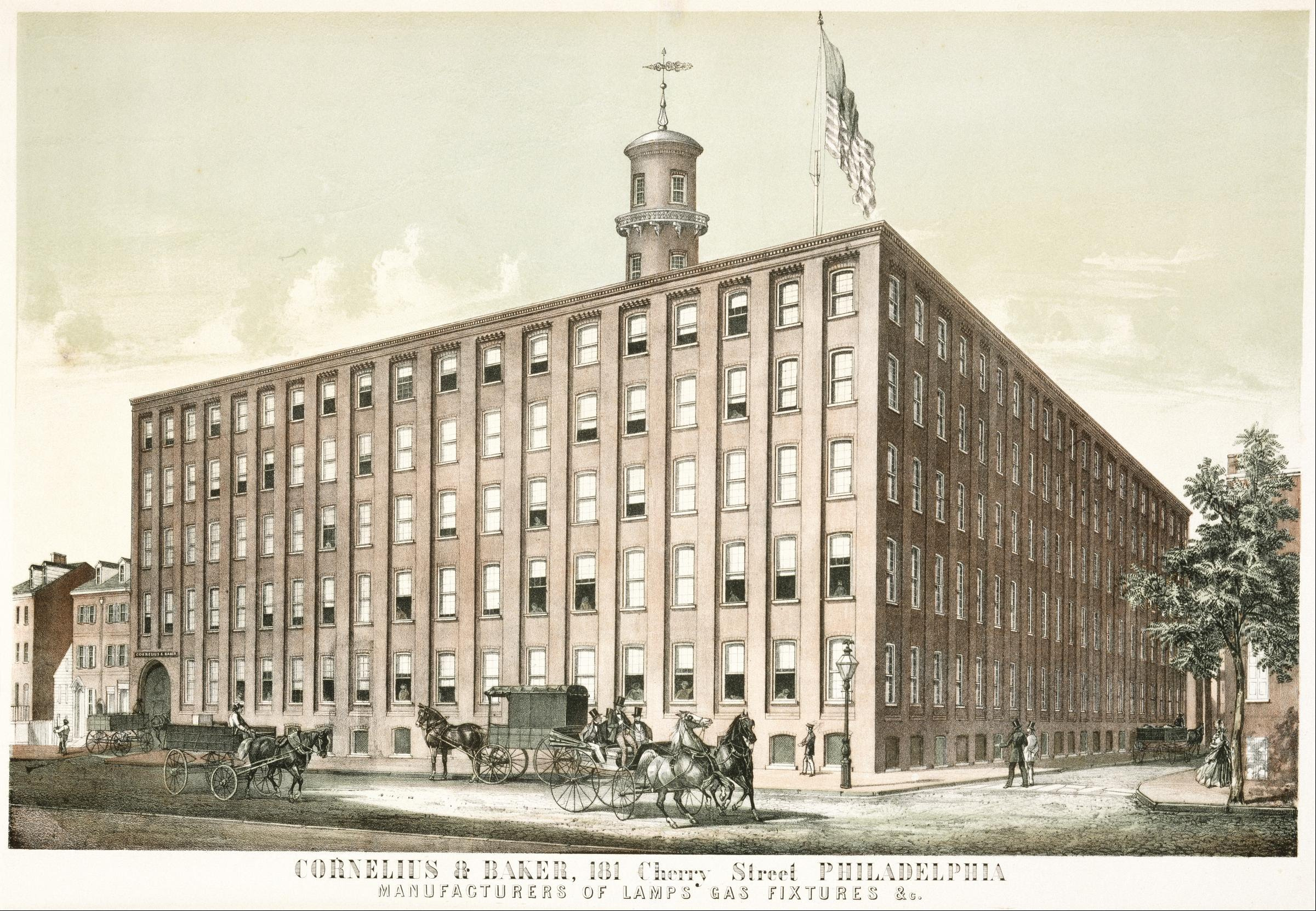
A lithograph of the Cornelius and Baker building by William H. Rease, printed by Wagner & McGuigan and published by J.H. Colton & Co. (1856)

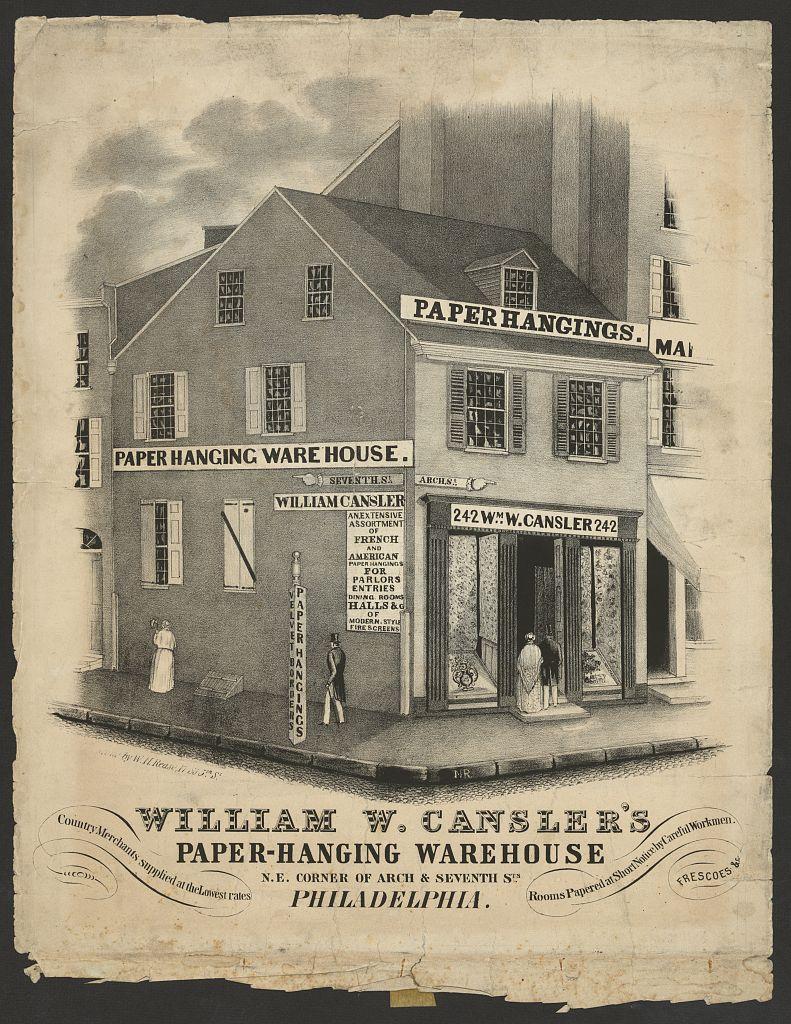
A lithograph of the Cansler paper-hanging warehouse in Philadelphia by William H. Rease. (c. 1845)

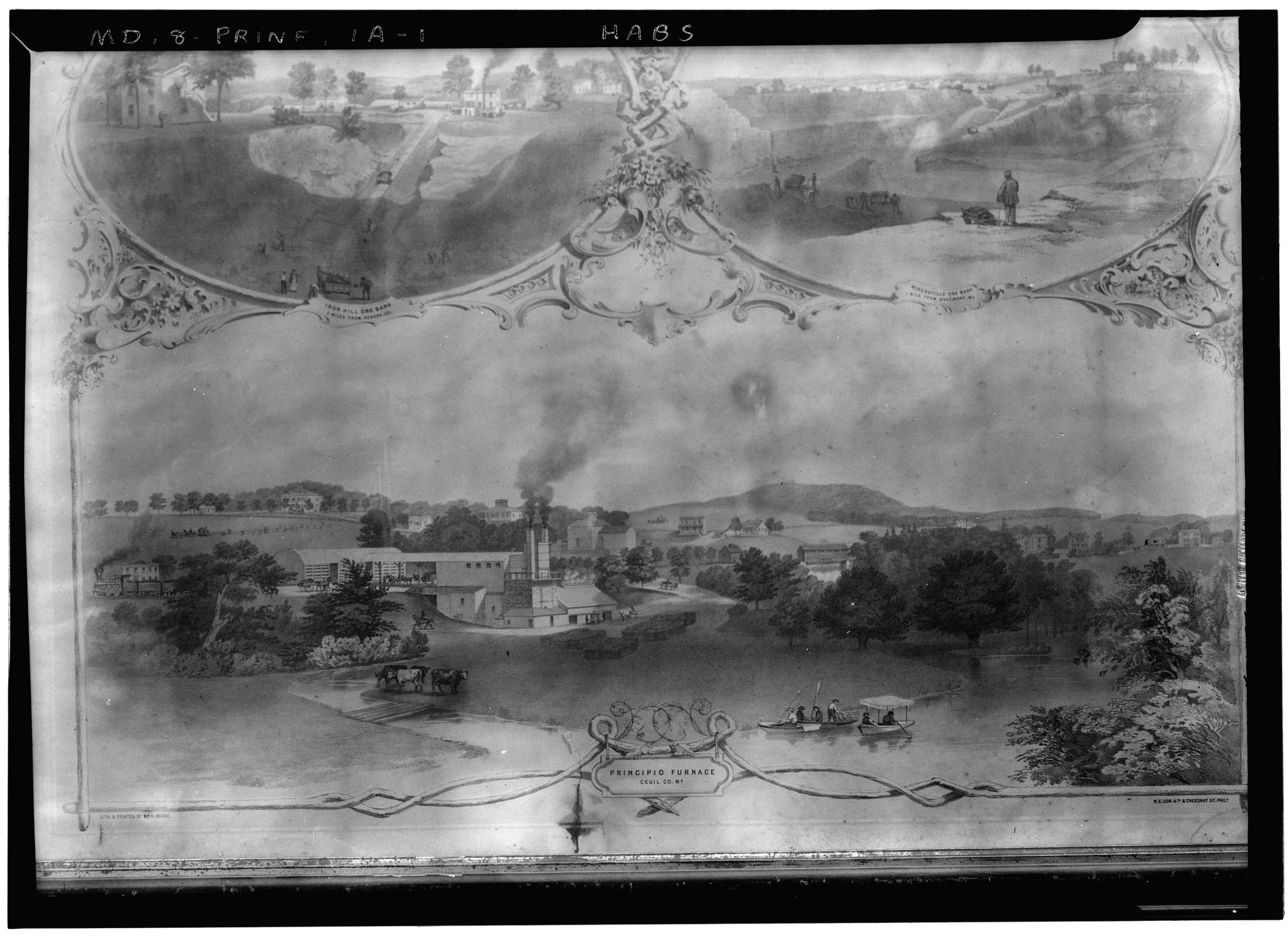
Views of the Principio Furnace by William H. Rease (After 1855)
