= Robert McKnight =

American politician (1820–1885)

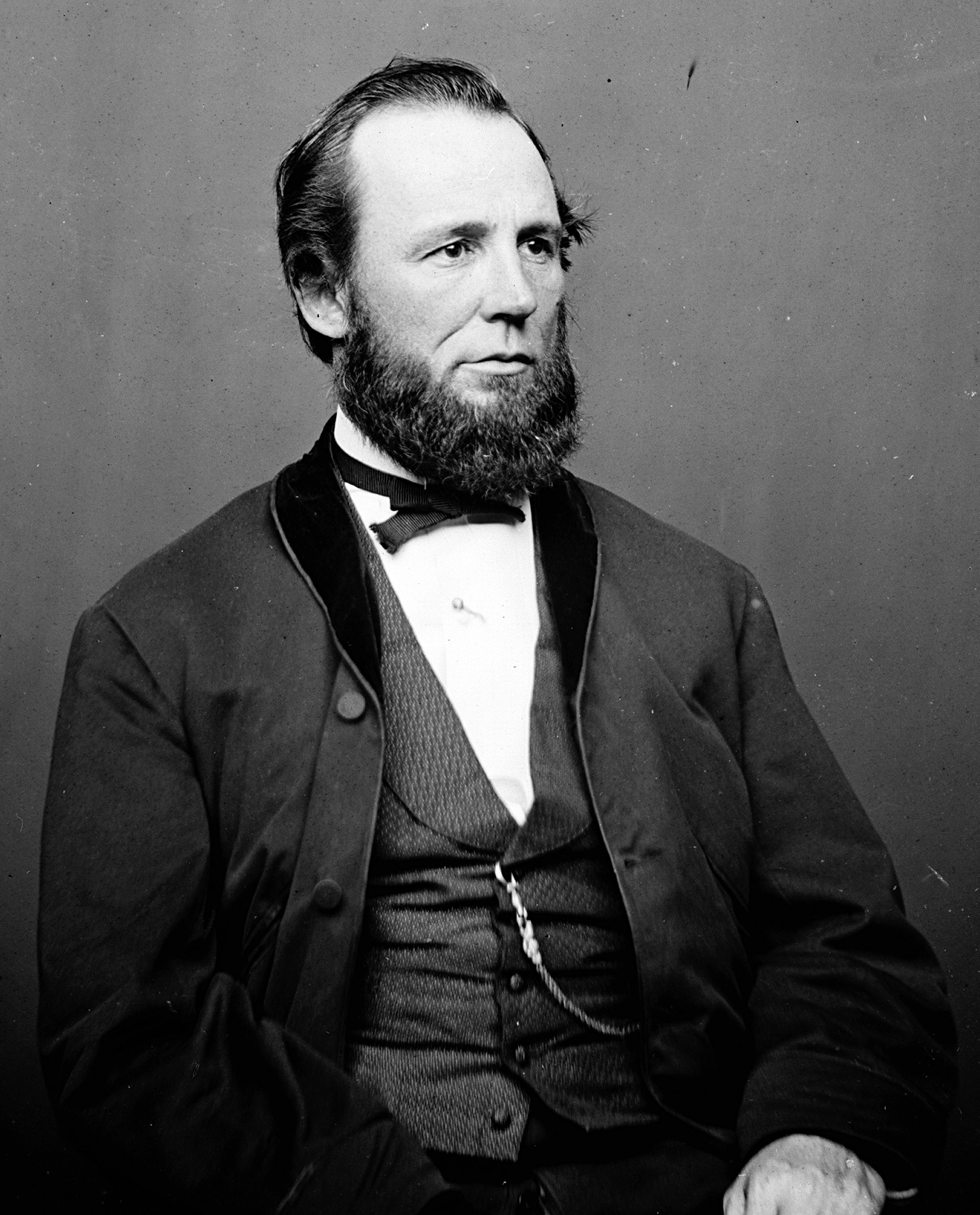

Member of the U.S. House of Representatives from Pennsylvania's 22nd district
- In office March 3, 1859 – March 4, 1863
- Preceded by: Samuel A. Purviance
- Succeeded by: James K. Moorhead

Member of the Pittsburgh City Council
- In office 1847–1849

Personal details
- Born: January 20, 1820 Pittsburgh, Pennsylvania, U.S.
- Died: October 25, 1885 (aged 65) Pittsburgh, Pennsylvania, U.S.
- Resting place: Allegheny Cemetery
- Party: Republican
- Children: Denny McKnight
- Education: Princeton College (BA)

Robert McKnight (January 20, 1820 – October 25, 1885) was an American lawyer and politician who represented Pennsylvania's 22nd congressional district in the United States House of Representatives from 1859 to 1863.

== Early life and education ==
Robert McKnight was born in Pittsburgh, Pennsylvania. He attended the common schools and a private school at Xenia, Ohio. He graduated from Princeton College in 1839.

== Career ==
McKnight studied law, was admitted to the bar in 1842, and joined a law partnership with Henry S. Magraw in Pittsburgh. In 1846, he was hired to be a solicitor for the Bank of Pittsburgh.

MnKnight served as a member of the Pittsburgh City Council from 1847 to 1849, and was subsequently elected as a Republican to the Thirty-sixth and Thirty-seventh Congresses. He served his district during the American Civil War.

After his final term in 1863, he resumed the practice of law.

== Personal life ==
McKnight died in Pittsburgh in 1885. He was interred at the Allegheny Cemetery. Early Pittsburgh Pirates owner Denny McKnight was his son.

== Gallery ==
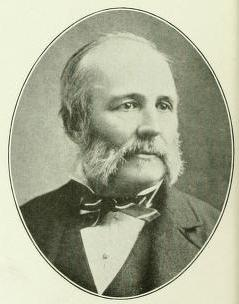
Robert McKnight, in later years

U.S. House of Representatives
| Preceded by Samuel A. Purviance | Member of the U.S. House of Representatives from Pennsylvania's 22nd congressional district 1859–1863 | Succeeded by James K. Moorhead |
