= David Ritchie (politician) =

American politician (1812–1867)

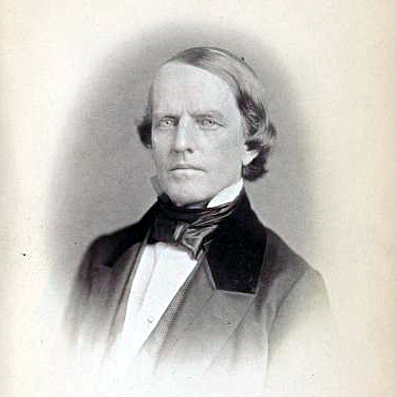

Member of the U.S. House of Representatives from Pennsylvania
- In office March 4, 1853 – March 3, 1859
- Preceded by: Thomas M. Howe
- Succeeded by: James K. Moorhead
- Constituency: 21st district

Associate Judge of the Court of Common Pleas of Allegheny County
- In office 1862

Personal details
- Born: August 19, 1812 Canonsburg, Pennsylvania
- Died: January 24, 1867 (aged 54) Pittsburgh, Pennsylvania
- Party: Whig; Republican
- Parent: Craig Ritchie Sr. (father)

David Ritchie (August 19, 1812 – January 24, 1867) was an American lawyer, politician and judge who served as a member of the U.S. House of Representatives from Pennsylvania.

== Early life and career ==
Ritchie was in Canonsburg, Pennsylvania on August 19, 1812. He was the youngest son of Craig Ritchie Sr. He graduated from Jefferson College in Canonsburg in 1829, and subsequently from a university in Heidelberg, Germany. He studied law, was admitted to the bar in 1835 and began his legal practice in Pittsburgh, Pennsylvania.

== U.S. House of Representatives ==
Ritchie served a member of the United States House of Representatives from 1853 until 1859. At different points, he was a member of the Whig and Republican parties.

Ritchie was elected as a Whig to the Thirty-third Congress, reelected as a Whig Party candidate to the Thirty-fourth Congress, and elected as a Republican to the Thirty-fifth Congress. He served as chairman of the United States House Committee on Revolutionary Claims during the Thirty-fourth Congress.

== County judgeship ==
He was appointed associate judge of the court of common pleas of Allegheny County, Pennsylvania, in 1862 and served nine months.

== Later career ==
Following the end of his legislative and judcicial careers, Ritchie resumed the practice of law.

== Death ==
Ritchie died in Pittsburgh on January 24, 1867.

U.S. House of Representatives
Preceded by Thomas M. Howe	Member of the U.S. House of Representatives from Pennsylvania's 21st congressional district 1853-1859	Succeeded by James K. Moorhead
