= La Belle Iron Works =

- U.S. National Register of Historic Places
- U.S. Historic district
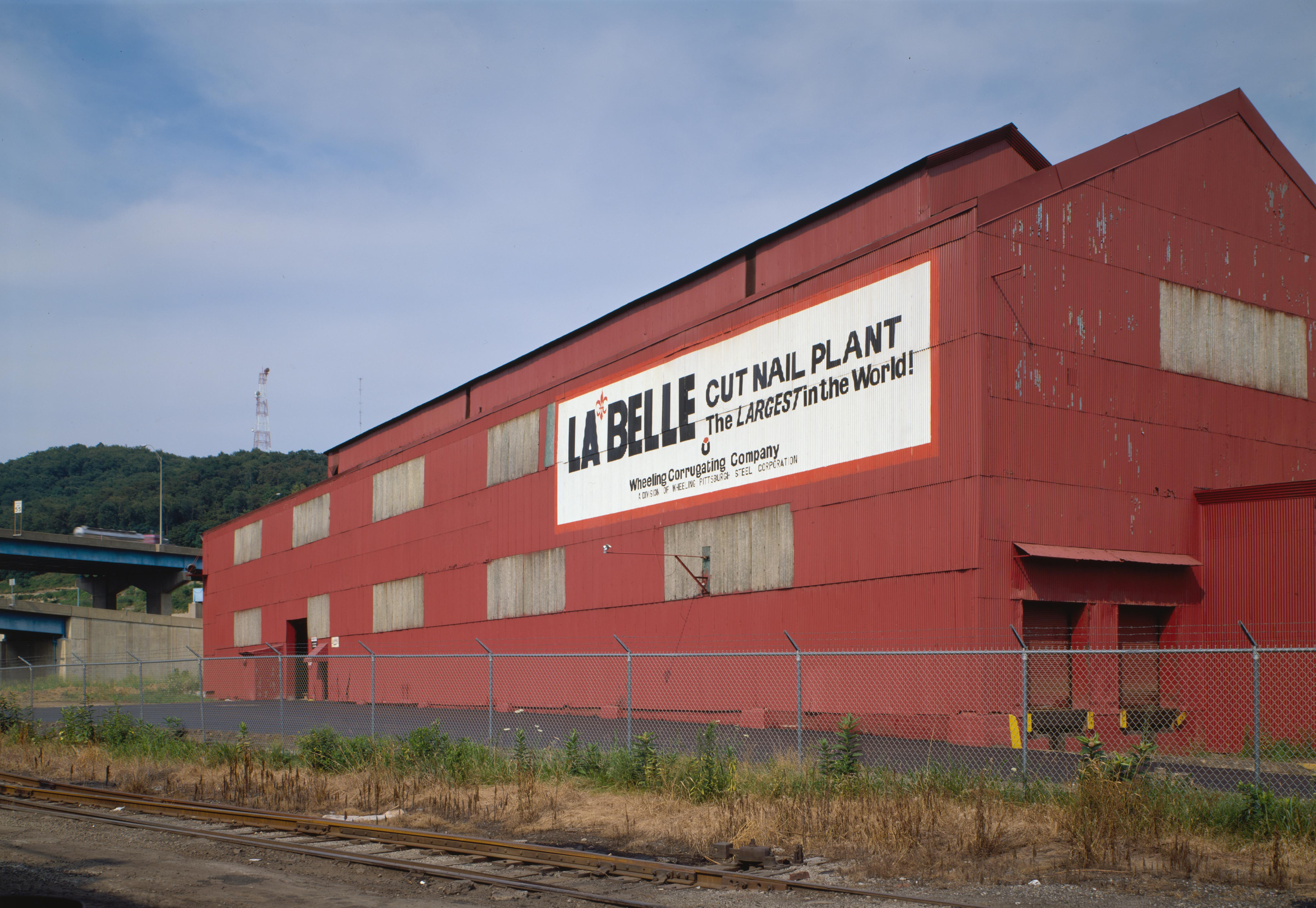
- La Belle Iron Works, July 1990

- Location within West Virginia Location within the United States
- Location: Jct. of 31st and Wood Sts., Wheeling, West Virginia
- Coordinates: 40°3′1″N 80°43′20″W
- Area: 4.6 acres (1.9 ha)
- Built: 1852
- Architectural style: Industrial Italianate
- NRHP reference No.: 97001415
- Added to NRHP: November 24, 1997

La Belle Iron Works, also known as La Belle Cut Nail Works, was a historic factory complex and national historic district located at Wheeling, Ohio County, West Virginia. The district included four contributing buildings; three Italianate style brick buildings dated to the founding of the company in 1852, and a tin plate mill built 1894–1897. After 1902, the buildings were combined under a single roof, although the truss systems date to different periods achieving the configuration visible in later images. When listed in 1997, it was known as the "La Belle Cut Nail Plant, The Largest in the World, Wheeling Corrugating Company, A Division of Wheeling Pittsburgh Steel Corporation." The cut nail machinery in use at La Belle at the end of the plant's working life dated to 1852 and the 1860s. The machinery at La Belle along with the different processes were documented by the Historic American Buildings Survey team during the summer of 1990.

The plant stopped operation in 2010, and was demolished in 2017.

It was listed on the National Register of Historic Places in 1997.
