= John Bayard McPherson =

American judge (1846–1919)

Judge of the United States Court of Appeals for the Third Circuit
- In office April 3, 1912 – January 20, 1919
- Appointed by: William Howard Taft
- Preceded by: William M. Lanning
- Succeeded by: Thomas Griffith Haight

Judge of the United States District Court for the Eastern District of Pennsylvania
- In office March 2, 1899 – April 8, 1912
- Appointed by: William McKinley
- Preceded by: William Butler
- Succeeded by: Joseph Whitaker Thompson

Personal details
- Born: John Bayard McPherson; November 5, 1846 Harrisburg, Pennsylvania, U.S.
- Died: January 20, 1919 (aged 72) Philadelphia, Pennsylvania, U.S.
- Education: Princeton University (AB, AM) read law

John Bayard McPherson (November 5, 1846 – January 20, 1919) was a United States circuit judge of the United States Court of Appeals for the Third Circuit and previously was a United States district judge of the United States District Court for the Eastern District of Pennsylvania.

== Education and career ==
Born in Harrisburg, Pennsylvania, McPherson attended the College of New Jersey (now Princeton University), receiving an Artium Baccalaureus degree in 1866 and an Artium Magister degree in 1869. He read law in 1870. He was in private practice in Harrisburg beginning in 1870. From 1874 to 1877 he was district attorney of Dauphin County, Pennsylvania, and from 1882 to 1899 served as a state court judge of the Court of Common Pleas in Harrisburg. Beginning in 1890, he taught at the University of Pennsylvania.

== Federal judicial service ==
McPherson was nominated by President William McKinley on February 28, 1899, to a seat on the United States District Court for the Eastern District of Pennsylvania vacated by Judge William Butler. He was confirmed by the United States Senate on March 2, 1899, and received his commission the same day. His service terminated on April 8, 1912, due to his elevation to the Third Circuit.

McPherson was nominated by President William Howard Taft on March 16, 1912, to a seat on the United States Court of Appeals for the Third Circuit vacated by Judge William M. Lanning. He was confirmed by the Senate on April 3, 1912, and received his commission the same day. His service terminated on January 20, 1919, due to his death in Philadelphia, Pennsylvania.

== Sources ==
Legal offices
Preceded by William Butler	Judge of the United States District Court for the Eastern District of Pennsylvania; 1899–1912	Succeeded by Joseph Whitaker Thompson
Preceded by William M. Lanning	Judge of the United States Court of Appeals for the Third Circuit; 1912–1919	Succeeded by Thomas Griffith Haight
