= Principio Furnace =

- U.S. National Register of Historic Places
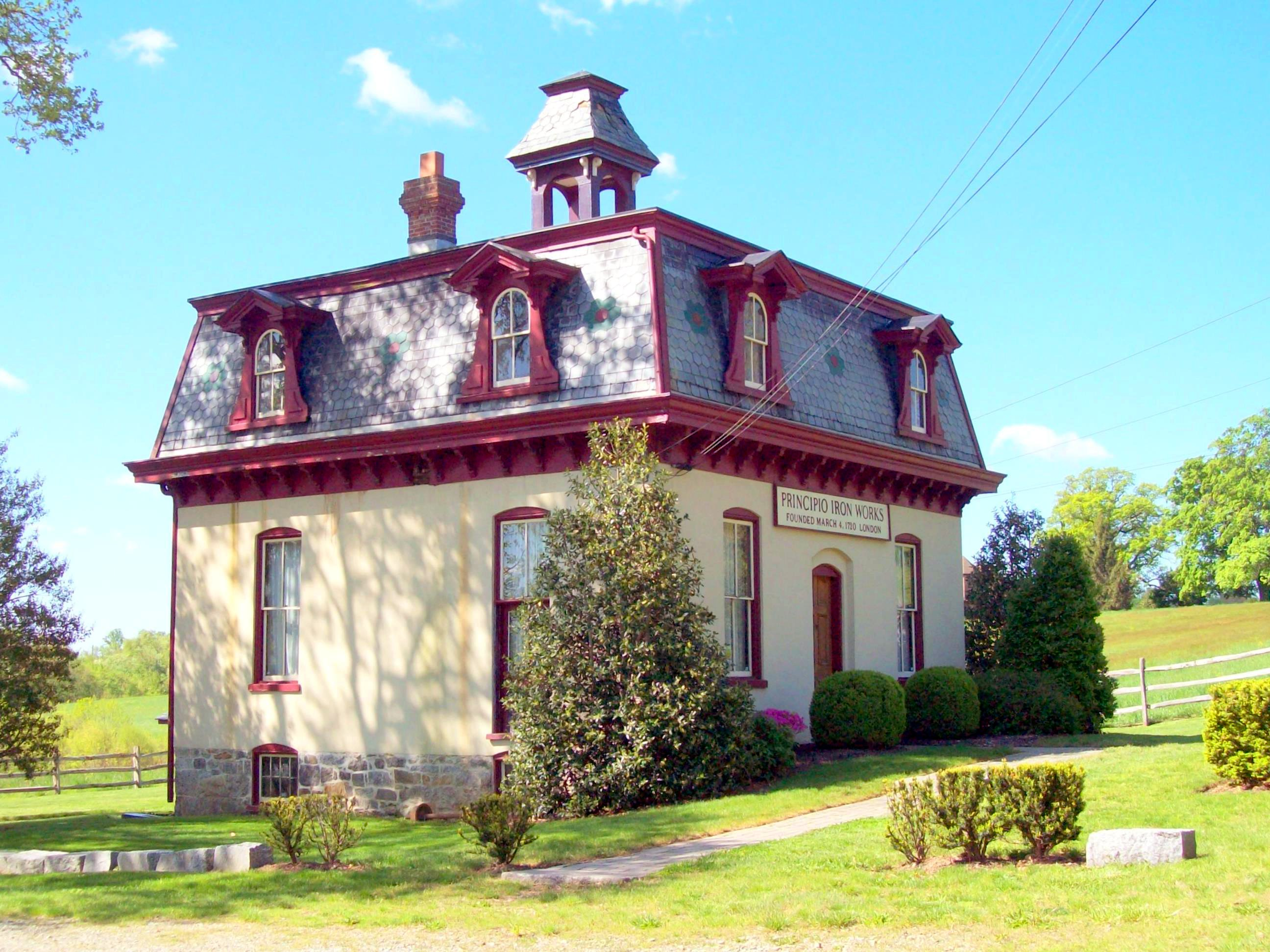
- Principio Furnace Office Structure, April 2010

- Location within Maryland Location within the United States
- Nearest city: Perryville, Maryland
- Coordinates: 39°34′38″N 76°02′11″W
- Area: 185 acres (75 ha)
- NRHP reference No.: 72000575
- Added to NRHP: February 11, 1972

Principio Furnace and village is in Cecil County, Maryland, 4 miles (6.4 km) northeast of Havre de Grace.

The Principio Iron Works were started here in 1719 by Joseph Farmer with British capital and an ironmaster, John England. By the 1740s, it had become one of the most successful colonial ironworks, producing pig iron for sale in London. Later, Thomas Russell, Jr., England's successor, produced cannonballs for the Continental Army during the American Revolution.

The works were part of the (larger) Principio Company, whose other holdings included the Accokeek or Potomac Ironworks on the land of George Washington's father, Augustine Washington (north of Ferry Farm near Fredericksburg, Virginia). This works was originally developed by the ironmaster England as a source of iron ore. As early as 1726, it may have included a cold blast charcoal furnace. Accokeek/Potomac served as the headquarters of the Principio Company until it was closed in the mid-1750s.

The Maryland works were burnt by British forces in 1813.

In 1836, the site and its ruined buildings were purchased by Joseph Whitaker, his brothers George P. Whitaker and Joseph Whitaker II, and partners Thomas Garrett (a prominent abolitionist) and William Chandler. The site still had water power; more importantly, it was crossed by the freshly laid tracks of the Philadelphia, Wilmington and Baltimore Railroad. Chandler was a director of the company. The investors rebuilt the iron works and resumed production, opening a new blast furnace in 1837 and other improvements over the decades.

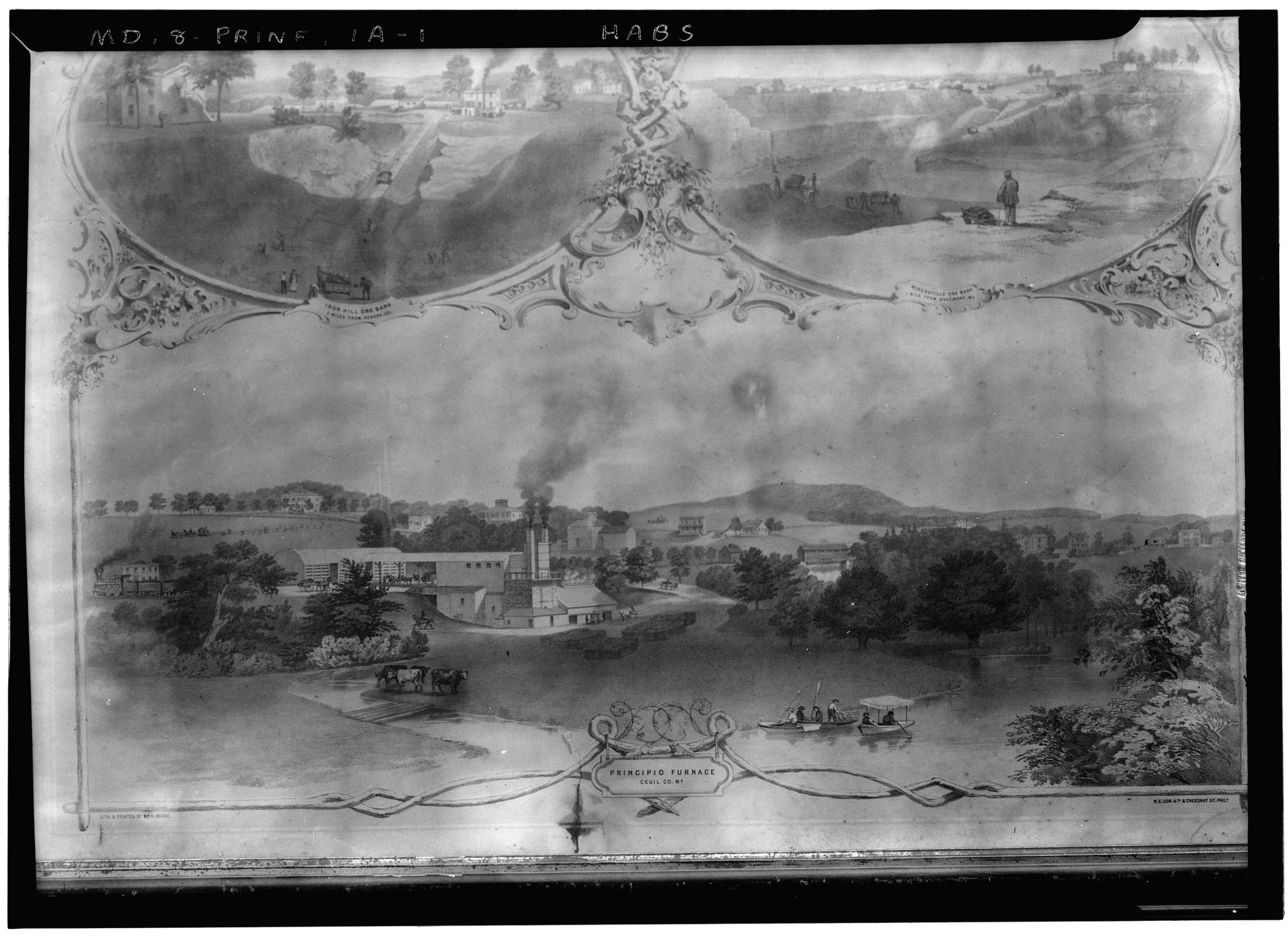
A scene of the activity at the furnace, published by a lithographer from Philadelphia, shows two chimneys and wooden railings around their base level atop the two-story bloomery. Two insets depict the open-pit mines where workers load carts with ore.

Before the Civil War, the Whitakers divided their holdings geographically, with Joseph receiving the Pennsylvania properties and George Price the Maryland and Virginia ones. George Price Whitaker and his descendants continued to be involved in the iron and steel business; their holdings became part of the Wheeling Steel Company in 1921, and eventually of Wheeling-Pittsburgh Steel.

The site produced iron until 1925.

In 1972, Principio Furnace was listed on the National Register of Historic Places.

Part of the stone furnace still remains on the site.

== Gallery ==
Remnants of the Principio Furnace

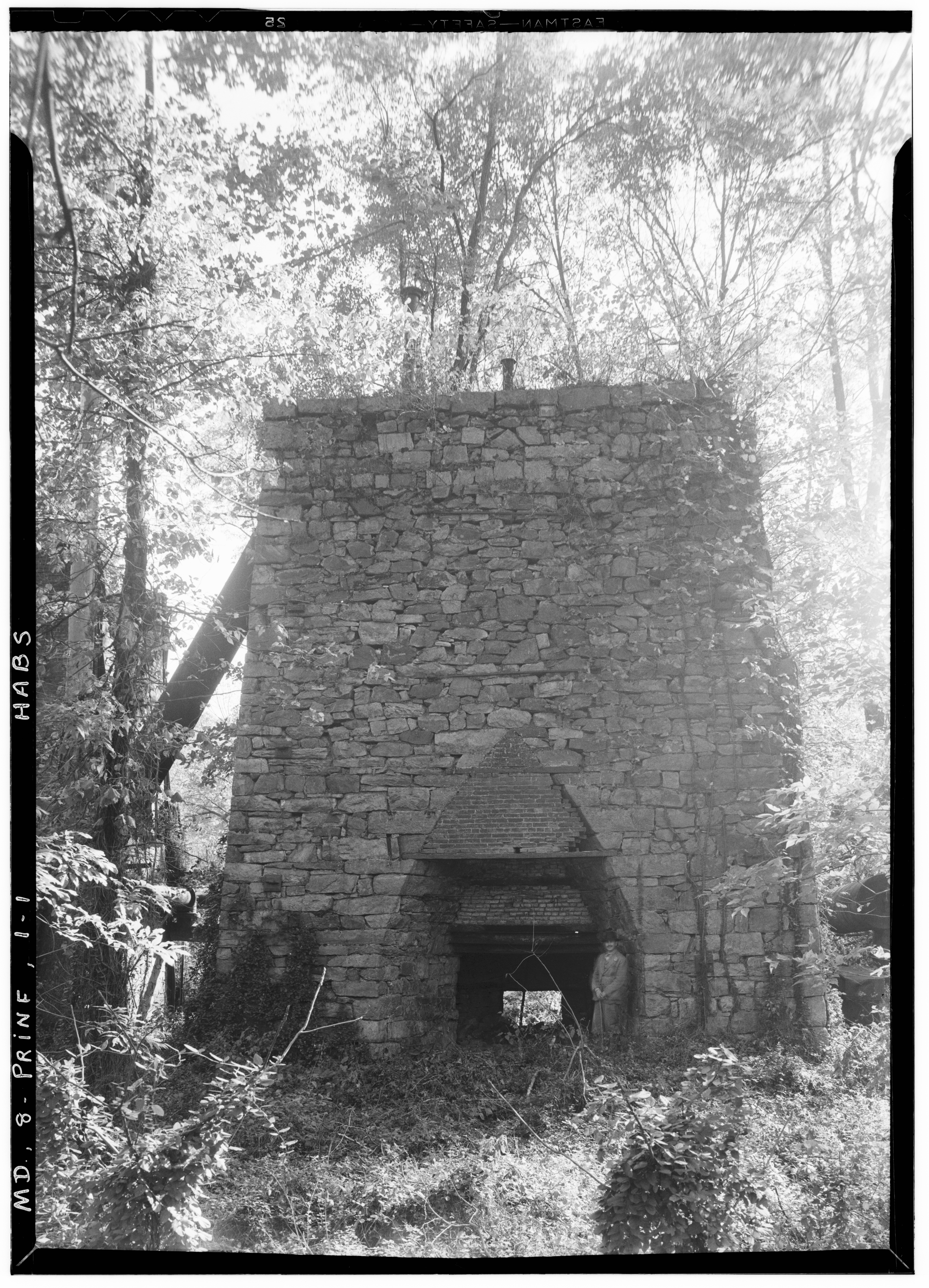
The old bloomery, depicted in 1936

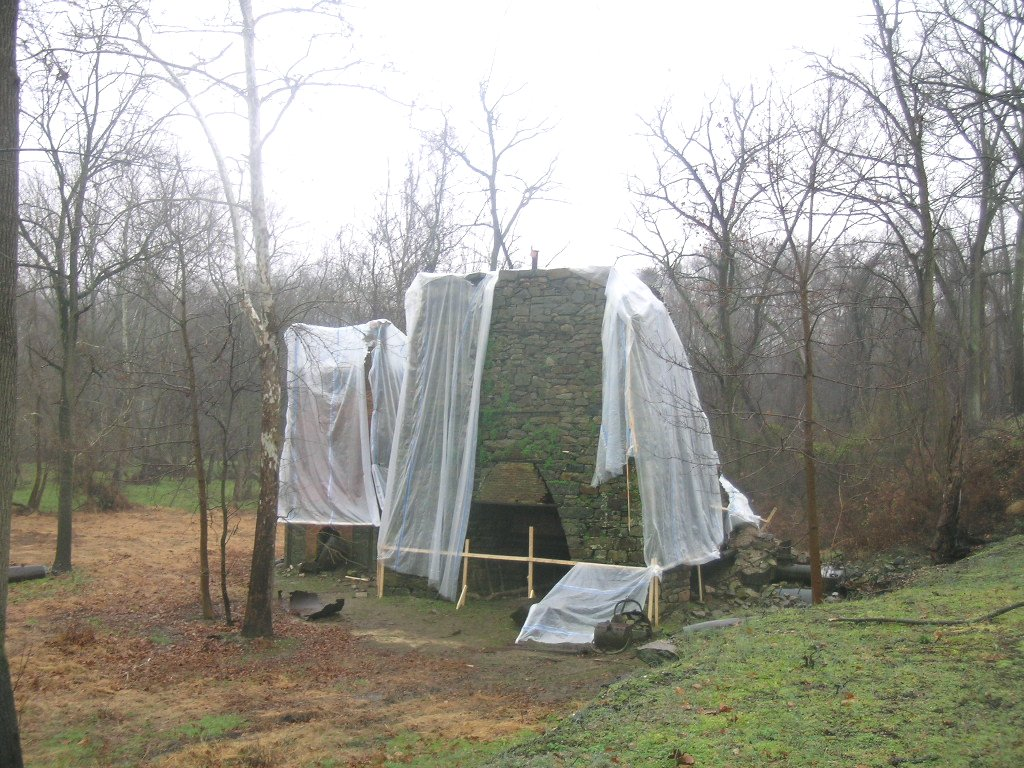
The old bloomery during the preservation works of 2015

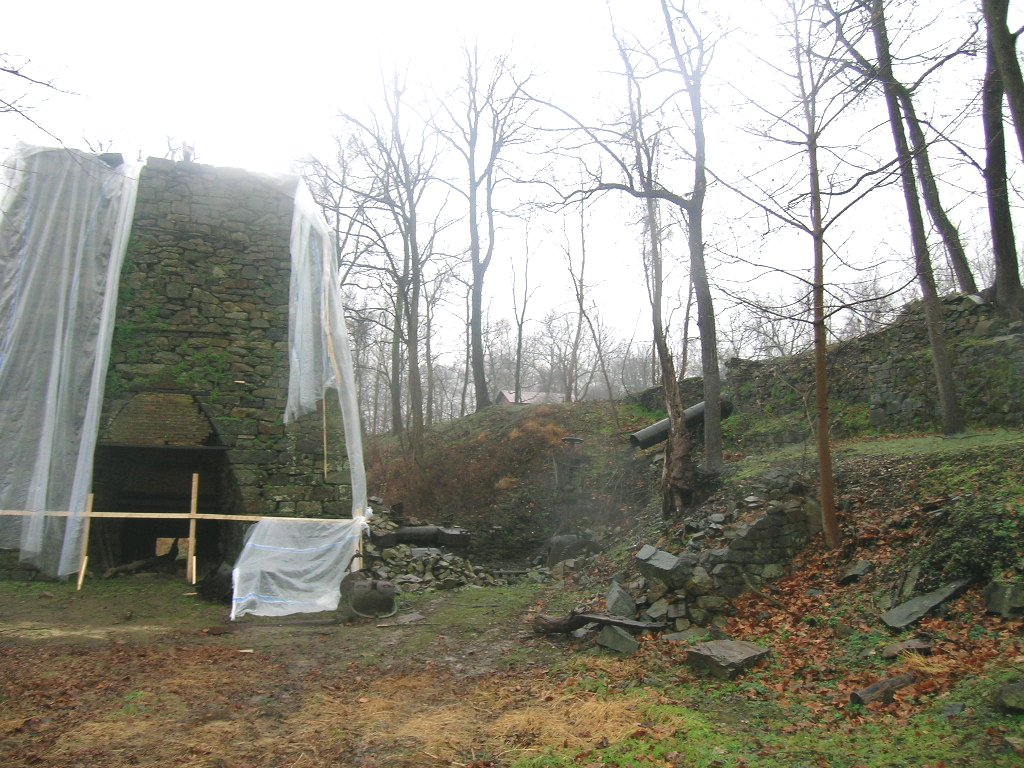
Another view of the bloomery, during the works of 2015

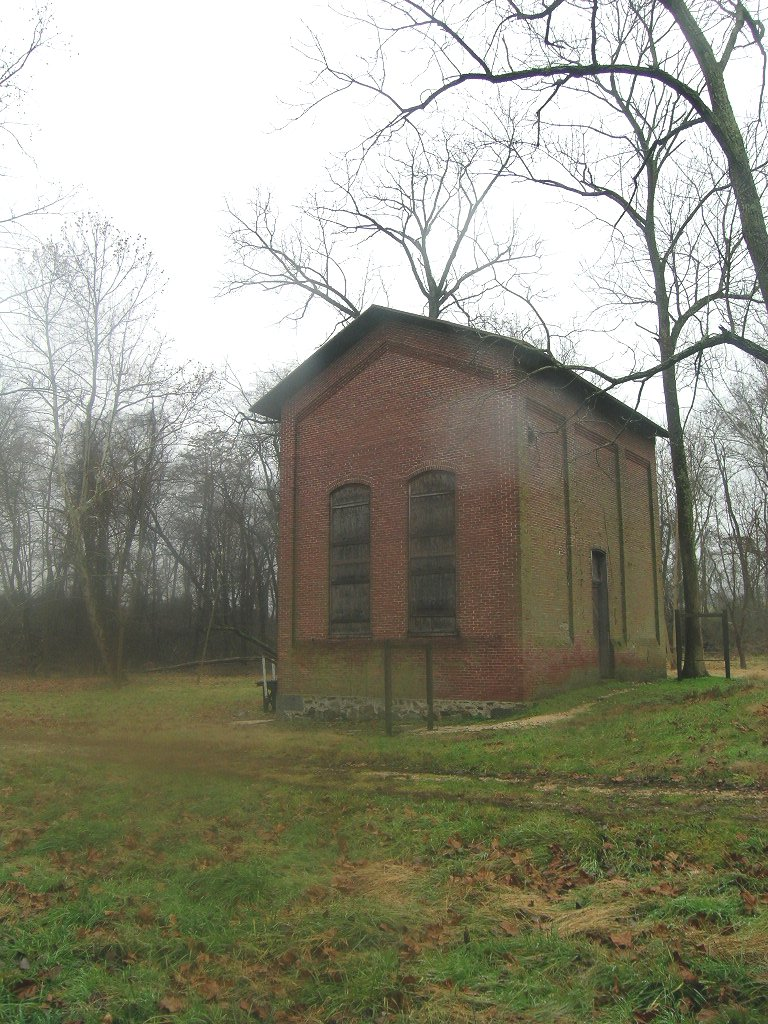
An outbuilding on the site of the Principio Furnace

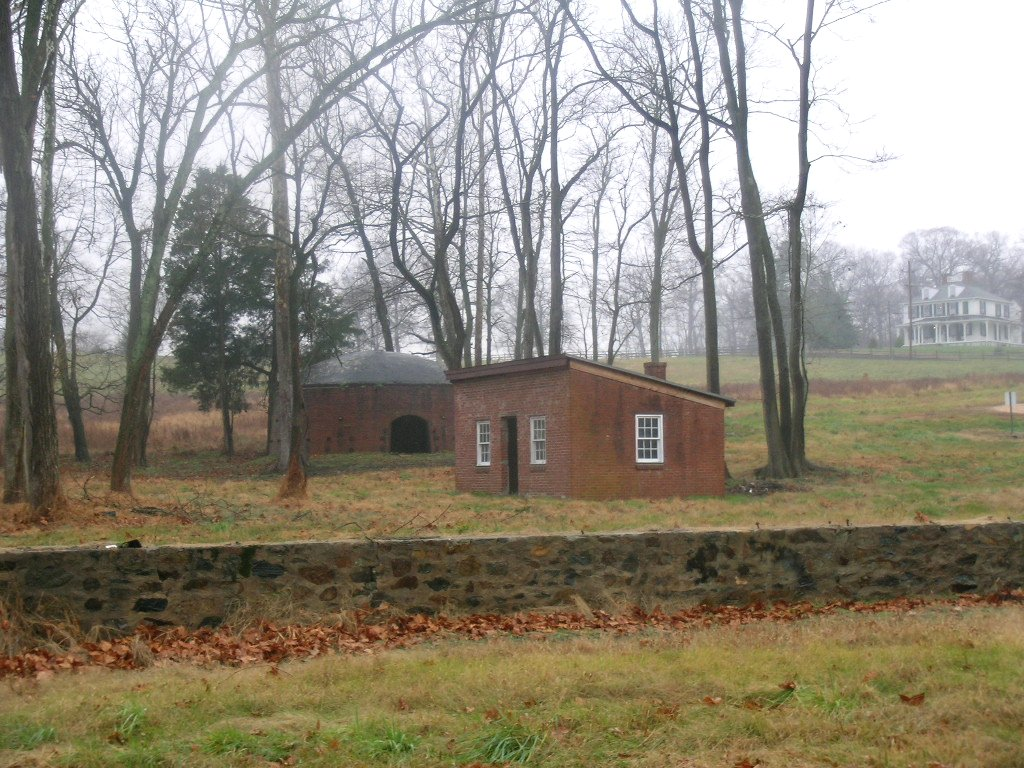
Two more outbuildings on the site of the Principio Furnace

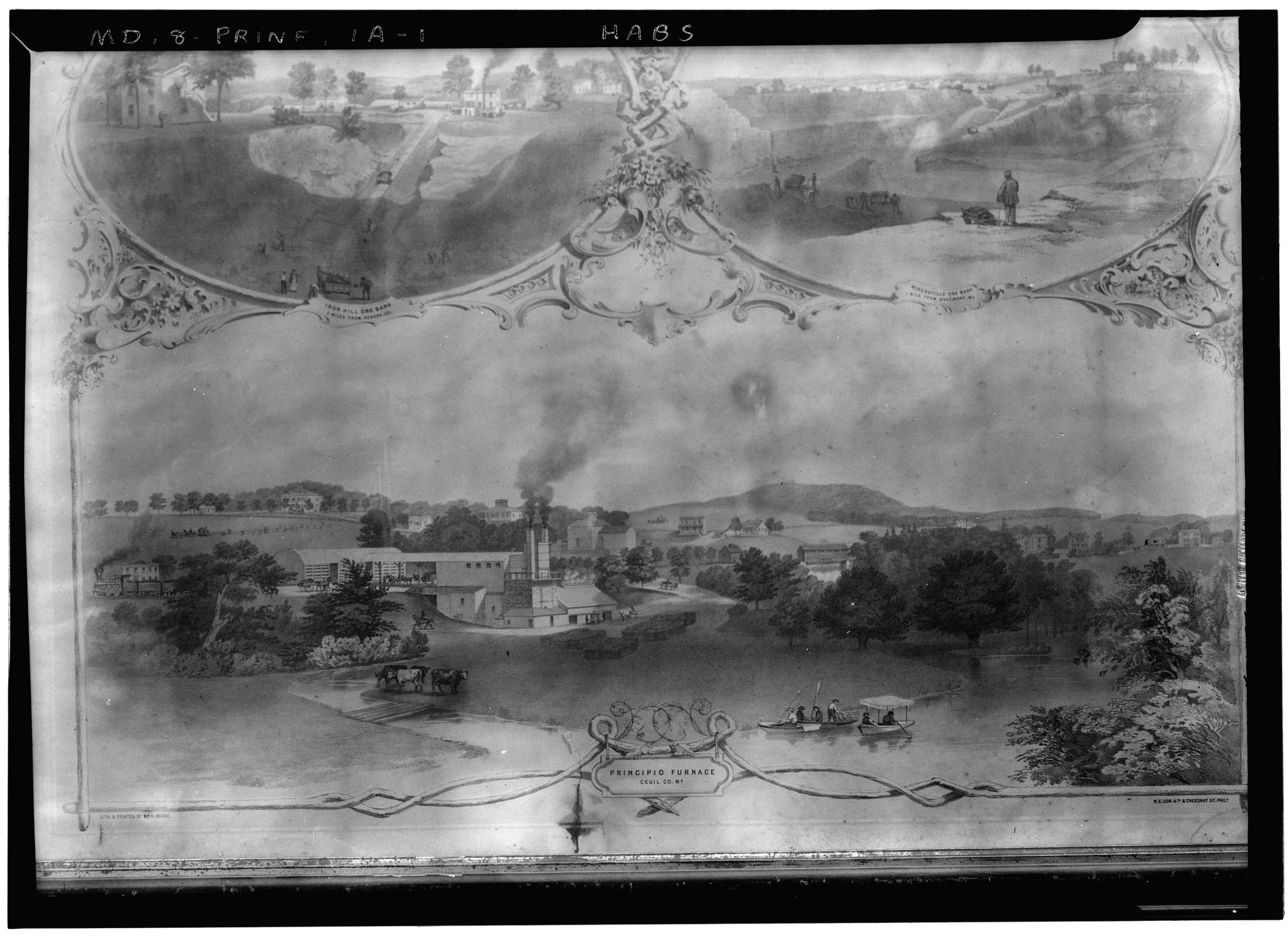
A lithograph scene of the activity at the furnace
