= Joseph Whitaker (industrialist) =

American businessman and politician (1789–1870)

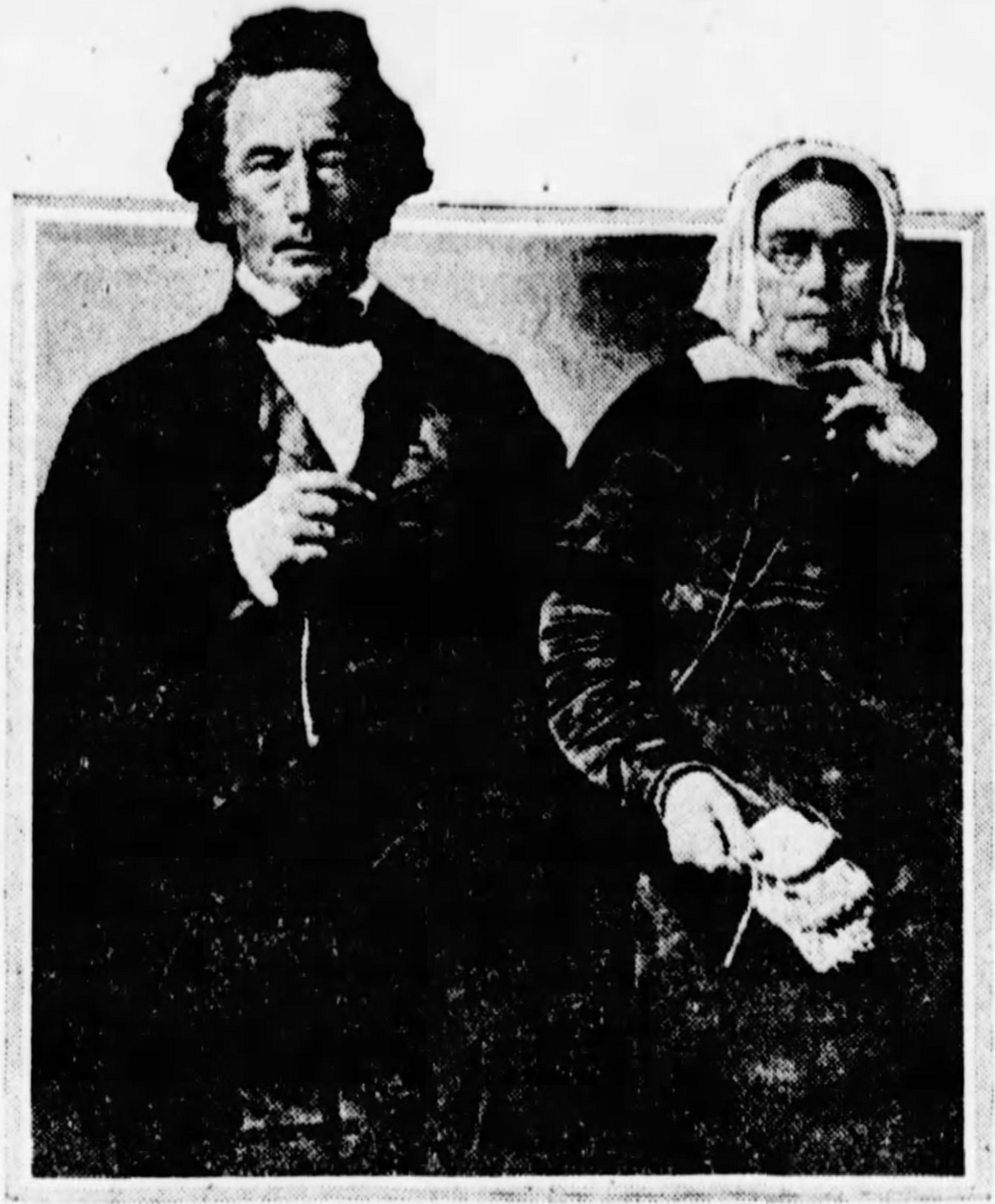
- Drawing of Joseph Whitaker and his wife Grace in a 1917 newspaper

Member of the Pennsylvania House of Representatives from the Chester County district
- In office 1844–1844 Serving with Robert Parke and Jesse C. Dickey
- Preceded by: Emmor Elton, John Beidler, Robert Parke, Jesse C. Dickey
- Succeeded by: William Price, Robert Parke, Jesse C. Dickey

Personal details
- Born: March 29, 1789
- Died: November 30, 1870 (aged 81) Mont Clare, Pennsylvania, U.S.
- Spouse: Grace Adams (m. 1811; died 1870)
- Children: 1
- Relatives: Samuel Whitaker Pennypacker (grandson); John Waters (great-great-great grandson)
- Occupation: Industrialist; landowner; politician

Joseph Whitaker (March 29, 1789 – November 30, 1870) was an American industrialist, landowner, and legislator in the Phoenixville and Mont Clare area of Pennsylvania, during the 19th century. He was a member of the Whitaker iron family.

== Early life ==
Joseph Whitaker was born on March 29, 1789. He attended a night school for a short time.

== Career ==
Until 1846, Whitaker was the ironmaster and an owner of the Phoenix Iron Works, the major industry in Phoenixville. He was elected by the Whigs to the Pennsylvania Assembly in 1843, where he served one term. He was responsible for having the first Mont Clare Bridge constructed in 1844. His 1846 estate was named Mont Clare, and eventually lent its name to the village of Mont Clare.

In 1836 Joseph, his brother George Price Whitaker, and some partners purchased the Principio Furnace in Maryland and revived ironmaking there. Before the Civil War the Whitakers divided their holdings geographically, with Joseph receiving the Pennsylvania properties and George Price the Maryland and Virginia ones. George Price Whitaker and his descendants continued to be involved in the iron and steel business; their holdings eventually became part of the Wheeling Steel Company in 1921, later Wheeling-Pittsburgh Steel.

== Personal life ==
Joseph married Grace Adams (1789–1870) of Swedesboro, New Jersey, on April 28, 1811. They had a daughter, Anna Maria, who married Isaac A. Pennypacker in 1839. Anna and Isaac's eldest son was Samuel Whitaker Pennypacker; a judge, historian, and the first 20th century Governor of Pennsylvania. When Isaac died in 1856, Anna and her children, including Samuel, came back to live in Mont Clare with Joseph.

Another of Joseph and Grace's children, Gertrude (1830–1914), married Rev. Charles Impey Thompson (1819–1883); their son Joseph Whitaker Thompson (1861–1946) was a United States federal judge at the circuit and district court levels.

Joseph is the great-great-great-grandfather of American filmmaker, actor, writer, and artist John Waters (born April 22, 1946).

Whitaker died of a heart attack on November 30, 1870, at his Mont Clare home.
