= Wheeling-Pittsburgh Steel =

Steel manufacturer from Wheeling, West Virginia

Wheeling-Pittsburgh Corporation
- Type: Defunct
- Industry: Metals
- Founded: 1920
- Fate: Acquired then liquidated
- Successor: RG Steel, LLC (bankrupt entity)
- Headquarters: Pittsburgh, Pennsylvania (1920–1986); Wheeling, West Virginia (1986–2013)
- Products: raw steel galvanized steel substrate steel coils bridge building sheet metal tin coke
- Number of employees: 3,133 (2006)

Wheeling-Pittsburgh Steel was a steel manufacturer based in Wheeling, West Virginia.

== Operations ==
The company owned the following factories, all of which are between Benwood, West Virginia, and Steubenville, Ohio.

- Ackermann Works at Wheeling, which produced pressed and drawn steel stampings used in the automotive and appliance industries.
- Beech Bottom Works at Beech Bottom, West Virginia, which consisted of sheet mills for producing hot rolled electrical sheets used by electrical equipment manufacturers. It also had facilities for coating long terne sheets produced by the Yorkville Works.
- Benwood Works at Benwood, West Virginia, which consisted of 2 pipe mills with slabs supplied from Steubenville Works.
- LaBelle Works at Wheeling, which manufactured cut nails.
- Martins Ferry Works at Martins Ferry, Ohio, which produced galvanized sheets, galvanized roofing and accessories, corrugated culverts, and hand-dipped items. It featured two continuous galvanizing lines where coils of steel strips were processed, galvanized, and treated and sold under the SofTite brand. A second galvanizing line went into operation in November 1953 at a cost of $3 million.
- Steubenville Works, which consisted of three integrated operations:
  - At the Steubenville North Works in Steubenville, Ohio, there were two blast furnaces, eleven open hearth furnaces, a blooming mill, a hot strip mill and cold reduction mills. The principal products of the North Works included hot-rolled sheets, plates, cold rolled sheets, and coils.
  - The Steubenville South Works in Mingo Junction, Ohio, was connected to the North Works by a standard gauge railroad. There were three blast furnaces and two Bessemer converters in operation there along with a blooming mill and auxiliary equipment. The South Works supplied hot metal for the open hearths at the North Works and Bessemer slabs for the Benwood Works.
  - The Steubenville East Works in Follansbee, West Virginia, was connected to the North Works by a railway bridge and produced coke and coke oven gas required for the manufacturing operations. It consisted of 314 coke ovens and those facilities also include a modern plant for the recovery of by-products from coke oven gas.
- Steelcrete Works, adjacent to Beech Bottom Works, manufactured expanded metal, metal lath, and accessories. It also produced Steelcrete bank vaults, reinforced mesh for buildings, stair treads, partitions, and miscellaneous items.
- Wheeling Works at Wheeling, which fabricated containers, stove pipe and furnace pipe, electric and gas dryers, roofing accessories, floor and roof decking, gasoline tanks for automobiles, and miscellaneous automobile parts.
- Yorkville Works at Yorkville, Ohio, which consisted of the first cold reduced black plate for tinning. The first tandem mill of its kind was installed in 1928. The facility produced electrolytic and hot-dipped tinplate, black plate, and terneplate. It also had a metal decorating plant for coating and lithographing tin, terne, and black plate, and two electrolytic tin plate lines that produced tin plate at up to 1,000 feet per minute.

Wheeling Steel was acquired by Pittsburgh Steel to form the Wheeling-Pittsburgh Steel Corporation in December 1968. The merger added:

- Allenport Works, a sheet steel plant in Allenport, Washington County, Pennsylvania.
- Monessen Works, a steel mill in Monessen, Pennsylvania.

== History ==
Wheeling Steel Corporation was organized on June 21, 1920. It consisted largely of the assets of the Whitaker iron family and associated families in the Ohio valley and remained under their control for many years.

In 1968, Wheeling Steel merged with Pittsburgh Steel to become the 9th-largest steelmaker in the United States at the time.

The company was slow to modernize its high-cost facilities and accumulated excess debt following a series of modernization programs in the 1960s and 1970s. Combined with labor contract disagreements and a pension crisis in the 1980s, the company filed for bankruptcy protection in 1985.

In 1986, the company closed the Monessen rail mill that employed 200 people. That same year, Wheeling-Pitt opened a galvanizing plant for automotive sheet steel as a joint-venture with Nisshin Steel (now Nippon Steel) in Follansbee, WV.

The company reduced its employee count from 8,500 in 1985 to 6,500 in 1990. In 1994, Wheeling-Pittsburgh Steel reorganized into a holding-company structure, where the newly formed WHX Corporation would become the parent company of Wheeling Pittsburgh Steel.

In 2001, the company filed for bankruptcy protection again after posting a major loss and increasing debt. In 2003, the company emerged from bankruptcy protection after a reorganization that would make it independent of the WHX Corporation.

In an effort to revitalize their aging steelmaking facilities and preserve jobs, Wheeling-Pitt received a $12.5 million loan from Ohio in 2003 to assist in installing a modern electric arc furnace at Steubenville South, supplanting the blast furnace still in use there. The EAF made its first heat in November 2004, and the remaining blast furnace of Steubenville North was idled along with the rest of that facility in May 2005.

Esmark acquired the company in November 2007 after a proxy battle. In May 2008, Esmark shut down the Allenport Works, laying off 240 people.

In March 2008, Nisshin Steel acquired full ownership of the Wheeling-Nisshin Steel galvanizing facility, ending the joint venture.

In August 2008, Severstal acquired Esmark's Wheeling-Pittsburgh holdings for $1.25 billion.

In 2009, Severstal idled most of the former Wheeling-Pitt operations, including Steubenville South and the manufacturing operations in Wheeling. The move laid off over 3,100 workers in West Virginia and Ohio.

In 2011, Severstal sold the former Wheeling-Pitt steelmaking operations to RG Steel, a subsidiary of Renco Group.

In 2012, RG Steel filed for bankruptcy protection and initiated layoffs.

As part of the Chapter 11 bankruptcy liquidation of RG Steel, the Yorkville, Ohio plant was sold back to Esmark, the Martins Ferry, Ohio plant was sold to a local businessman, and the Steubenville, Ohio plant was sold to the metal recycler Herman Strauss.

Steubenville South was purchased and refurbished by a group of investors called Acero Junction, who sold the mill to JSW Steel Ltd for $80.81 million in June 2018. The mill, now operated as JSW Steel Ohio, began melting and casting steel that December. In July 2020, JSW Steel Ohio was idled indefinitely pending upgrade or replacement of the electric arc furnace, affecting 160 employees. On March 8, 2021, JSW Steel announced that the upgrade of the electric arc furnace had been completed, the mill would restart the following week. The mill is now capable of producing 12 inch mini-slabs for JSW Steel's pipe and plate facility in Baytown, Texas.

The Follansbee, WV coke-making facility was retained by Severstal until 2014, when it was sold to AK Steel The facility is currently operated as Mountain State Carbon, LLC, a wholly owned subsidiary of AK Steel. On February 11, 2022, Cleveland-Cliffs, the owner and operator of the facility since its acquisition of AK Steel in 2020, announced that it would permanently close Mountain State Carbon in the second quarter of 2022, citing the increased usage of hot briquetted iron and scrap in the company's steelmaking decreasing its need for coke. All 288 employees at the facility will be offered positions within Cleveland Cliffs, with a staff of 15 being maintained to comply with the regulations of decommissioning the coke works.

The former Beech Bottom Works site is being refurbished by aluminum producer Jupiter Aluminum to coat aluminum coils.
