= Jethro J. McCullough =

American politician and businessman (1810–1878)

Member of the Maryland House of Delegates from the Cecil County district
- In office 1865–1867 Serving with Jesse Allen Kirk, James McCauley, George B. Pennington

Personal details
- Born: Jethro Johnson McCullough; March 8, 1810 near Newark, Delaware, U.S.
- Died: May 25, 1878 (aged 68) Philadelphia, Pennsylvania, U.S.
- Resting place: Methodist Episcopal Church cemetery North East, Maryland, U.S.
- Party: Republican
- Spouse: Elizabeth Tull (m. 1834)
- Children: 10
- Occupation: Politician; businessman

Jethro Johnson McCullough (March 8, 1810 – May 25, 1878) was an American politician and businessman from Maryland. He served as a member of the Maryland House of Delegates, representing Cecil County from 1865 to 1867.

== Early life ==
Jethro Johnson McCullough was born on March 8, 1810, at White Clay Creek hundred near Newark, Delaware, to Enoch McCullough. His father was a carpet maker and weaver. At the age of six, McCullough worked at Roseville cotton factory. He worked there for two years. At the age of eight, McCullough worked at his father's carpet and coverlet weaving shop. He remained working at the shop until his father's death in 1827. He then worked for a farmer for one year before apprenticing to become a millwright for three years.

== Career ==
McCullough then worked as a journeyman in Manayunk, Philadelphia, for two years. He then started up his own business as millwright. He conducted business in Chester County, Pennsylvania, New Castle County, Delaware, and Cecil County, Maryland. In 1842, McCullough went into business with C. P. (or C. J.) Marshall and J. Marshall on a small rolling mill on Red Clay Creek, near Stanton, Delaware, later named the Marshallton Mill. He remained working there for five years.

On February 2, 1847, McCullough purchased a large property in North East, Maryland, and moved there in March of that year. He also formed the partnership McCullough & Co in 1847. In 1853, he purchased the West Amwell Iron Works near Elkton and built the West Amwell Mill. In that same year, the business started manufacturing galvanized iron. In 1856, McCullough purchased the "Stony Chase" property near North East and built the Shannon Mill. In 1857, he purchased the Rowlandsville Mill. In 1861, the iron company that he was associated was incorporated as the McCullough Iron Company of Cecil. In 1863, a steam mill in North East was established to manufacture iron. The McCullough Iron Company was reincorporated in 1865.

McCullough sided with the Union in the Civil War. He was elected as county commissioner of Cecil County in 1855 and 1859. McCullough was a Republican. He served as a member of the Maryland House of Delegates, representing Cecil County, from 1865 to 1867. He was a supporter of the temperance movement.

== Personal life ==
McCullough married Elizabeth Tull, daughter of John Tull, of Cecil County on January 2, 1834. They had nine sons and one daughter, including Enoch, George, John and Samuel D. His son Samuel served as town commissioner and town treasurer of North East. He lived in North East from 1847 to the 1860s. He then moved to Wilmington, Delaware. He was a member of the Methodist Episcopal church.

McCullough died on May 25, 1878, at the home of Mrs. George Smyth in Philadelphia. He was buried at the Methodist Episcopal Church cemetery in North East.
