= James McCauley =

American politician and judge (1809–1897)

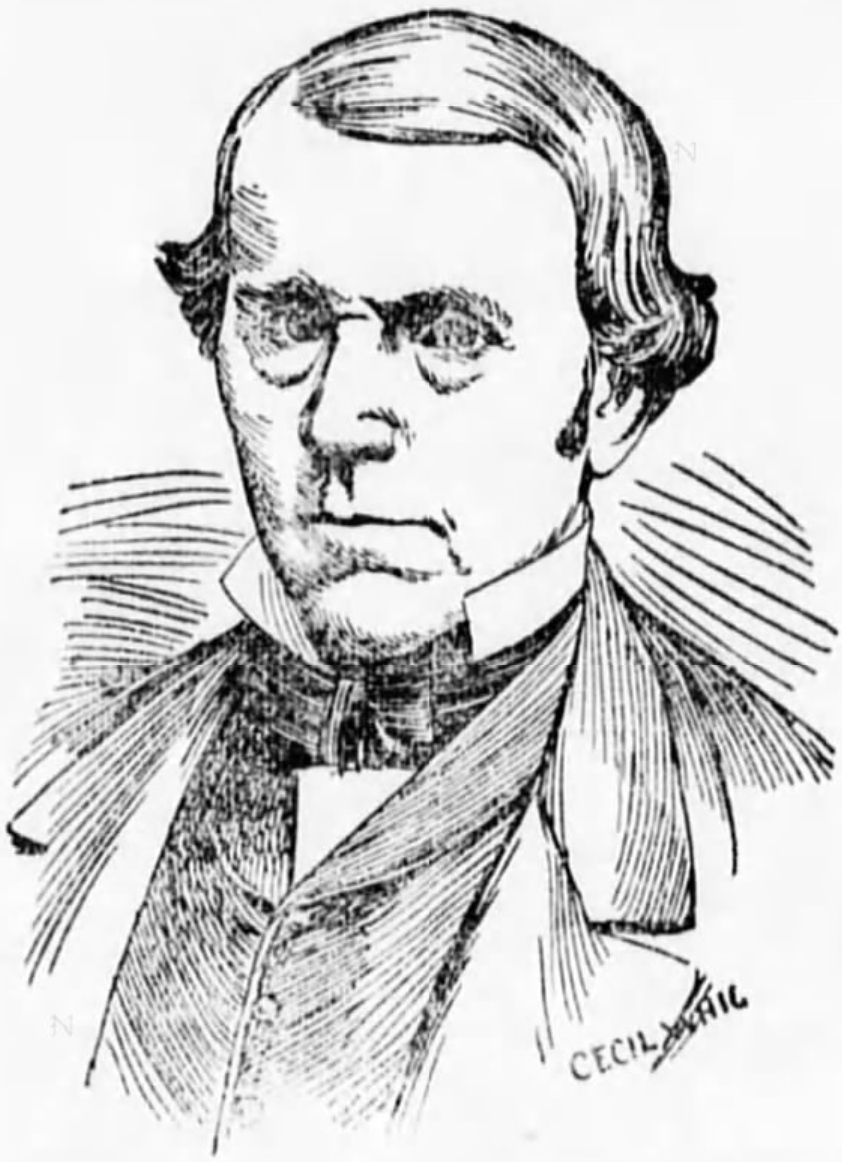
- Sketch of McCauley in 1897 newspaper

Member of the Maryland House of Delegates from the Cecil County district
- In office 1865–1866 Serving with Jesse Allen Kirk, Jethro J. McCullough, George B. Pennington

Personal details
- Born: August 23, 1809 Cecil County, Maryland, U.S.
- Died: January 25, 1897 (aged 87) Leeds, Maryland, U.S.
- Spouse(s): Sarah Beard (m. 1834; died 1846) Millicent Price (m. 1849)
- Children: 8
- Occupation: Politician; judge; engineer

James McCauley (August 23, 1809 – January 25, 1897) was an American politician and judge from Maryland. He served as a member of the Maryland House of Delegates, representing Cecil County, from 1865 to 1866.

== Early life ==
James McCauley was born on August 23, 1809, at an old stone house called Lowry's on Van Bibber's Forrest near Mechanics' Valley in Cecil County, Maryland, to Elizabeth (née McCauley) and John McCauley. His mother and father were first cousins. He was the first cousin of James A. McCauley, president of Dickinson College and Methodist Episcopal minister. McCauley received his early education at Maffit's schoolhouse and took grammar lessons with Dr. Cleveland in North East. He became a surveyor and also learned the trade of a cooper, but did not pursue it for long.

== Career ==
In 1830, McCauley worked for a short time with the U.S. Corps of Engineers on the Baltimore and Ohio Railroad in Sykesville. In 1833, McCauley manufactured portable four-horse threshing machines in Cecil County. McCauley wrote Field Books of Surveys in Cecil County, compiling plats and surveys within Cecil County. He also contributed poetry to county newspapers.

In 1841, Governor Thomas Pratt appointed McCauley as county surveyor. In 1857, McCauley was elected as register of wills and served in that role for six years. During the Civil War, McCauley supported the Union side.

McCauley served as a member of the Maryland House of Delegates, representing Cecil County, from 1865 to 1866. He served as chairman of the education committee. McCauley was a supporter of the temperance movement and helped pass legislation for closing drinking places on election days.

In 1868, McCauley was appointed as school commissioner of the third district and served as president of the board until December 1868. In December 1868, McCauley was appointed by Governor Thomas Swann as chief judge of the Orphans' Court, replacing Levi H. Evans. He was then elected to six consecutive terms. His last term expired in November 1895.

== Personal life ==
On November 27, 1834, McCauley married Sarah Warrington Beard. They had five children, twins Elizabeth and Mary, John, Rachel and Hannah Louise. His wife died in 1846. In 1849, McCauley married Millicent K. Price of Sassafras Neck. They had three children, Helen A., James J. and Hattie S. His son John served as a first lieutenant in the Union Army during the Civil War. McCauley was a member of the Methodist Protestant Church in Leeds.

McCauley died of pneumonia on January 25, 1897, at his home near Leeds.
