= Jesse Allen Kirk =

American politician (1822–1903)

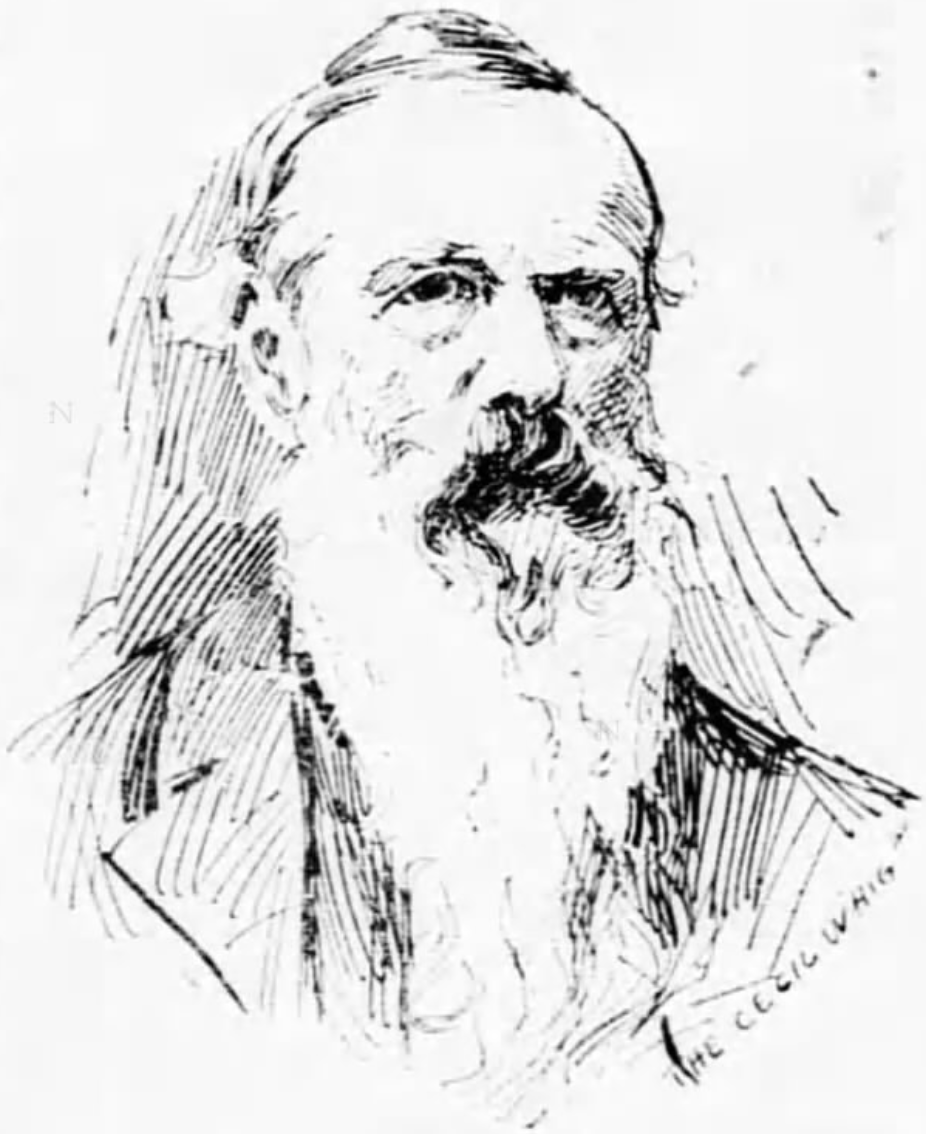
- Sketch of Kirk in 1894 newspaper

Member of the Maryland House of Delegates from the Cecil County district
- In office 1865–1866 Serving with James McCauley, Jethro J. McCullough, George B. Pennington

Personal details
- Born: June 22, 1822 near Rising Sun, Maryland, U.S.
- Died: August 23, 1903 (aged 81)
- Resting place: West Nottingham Cemetery
- Party: Republican
- Spouse(s): Hannah Mount (died 1885) Mary J. Truman (m. 1887)
- Children: 5
- Occupation: Politician; businessman

Jesse Allen Kirk (June 22, 1822 – August 23, 1903) was an American politician from Maryland. He served as a member of the Maryland House of Delegates, representing Cecil County from 1865 to 1866.

== Early life ==
Jesse Allen Kirk was born on June 22, 1822, on a farm near Rising Sun, Maryland, to Martha (née McCullough) and Allen Kirk. He was descended from Roger Kirk, an immigrant from north Ireland in 1712. As a youth, he worked on his father's farm. He then attended public schools in Cecil County and taught school for two years.

== Career ==
In 1846, Kirk worked in general merchandising in Rising Sun with his older brother and Basil Haines. In March 1848, Kirk was appointed as postmaster at Rising Sun. In 1850, he sold the merchandising store he owned with his brother and Haines. In 1850 or 1852, Kirk became a partner in the firm of Haines, Kirk and Stubbs. In 1857, Kirk worked in the hardware business. He continued in this endeavor until his retirement in 1876.

Kirk was a Republican. He served as a member of the Maryland House of Delegates, representing Cecil County, from 1865 to 1866.

Kirk was one of the original stockholders of the National Bank of Rising Sun. He helped found the bank in 1871. He served as vice president of the bank until his death. In January 1886, Kirk was appointed school commissioner of Cecil County by judge Frederick Stump. He served in that role for eight years. He was appointed as school commissioner again in 1897 following the death of Frank S. Everist.

== Personal life ==
Kirk married Hannah Mount on March 21, 1851 (or 1856). They had one son, Mount E. His wife died in 1885. Kirk married Mary J. (née Warner) Truman on March 14, 1887. They had four children, Mrs. Dr. Heston, Mrs. D. M. Taylor, Mrs. Violet Haines and Thomas Rittenhouse.

Kirk died on August 23, 1903. He was buried at West Nottingham Cemetery.
