= Maryland Route 316 =

State highway in Maryland, United States

Maryland Route 316
- Appleton Road
- Maryland Route 316 highlighted in red

Route information
- Maintained by MDSHA
- Length: 2.67 mi (4.30 km)
- Existed: 1927–present

Major junctions
- South end: MD 279 near Elkton
- North end: MD 277 near Elk Mills

Location
- Country: United States
- State: Maryland
- Counties: Cecil

Highway system
- Maryland highway system; Interstate; US; State; Scenic Byways
← MD 315	→ MD 317

Maryland Route 316 (MD 316) is a state highway in the U.S. state of Maryland. Known as Appleton Road, the highway runs 2.67 miles (4.30 km) from MD 279 near Elkton north to MD 277 near Elk Mills in northeastern Cecil County. MD 316 was constructed in the early 1910s from Elkton to Elk Mills and in the early 1920s north of Elk Mills. In the early 1960s, the disjoint northern segment of the highway was transferred to the county and the highway's present southern terminus was established when MD 279 moved to a new alignment north of Elkton in the early 1960s.

== Route description ==
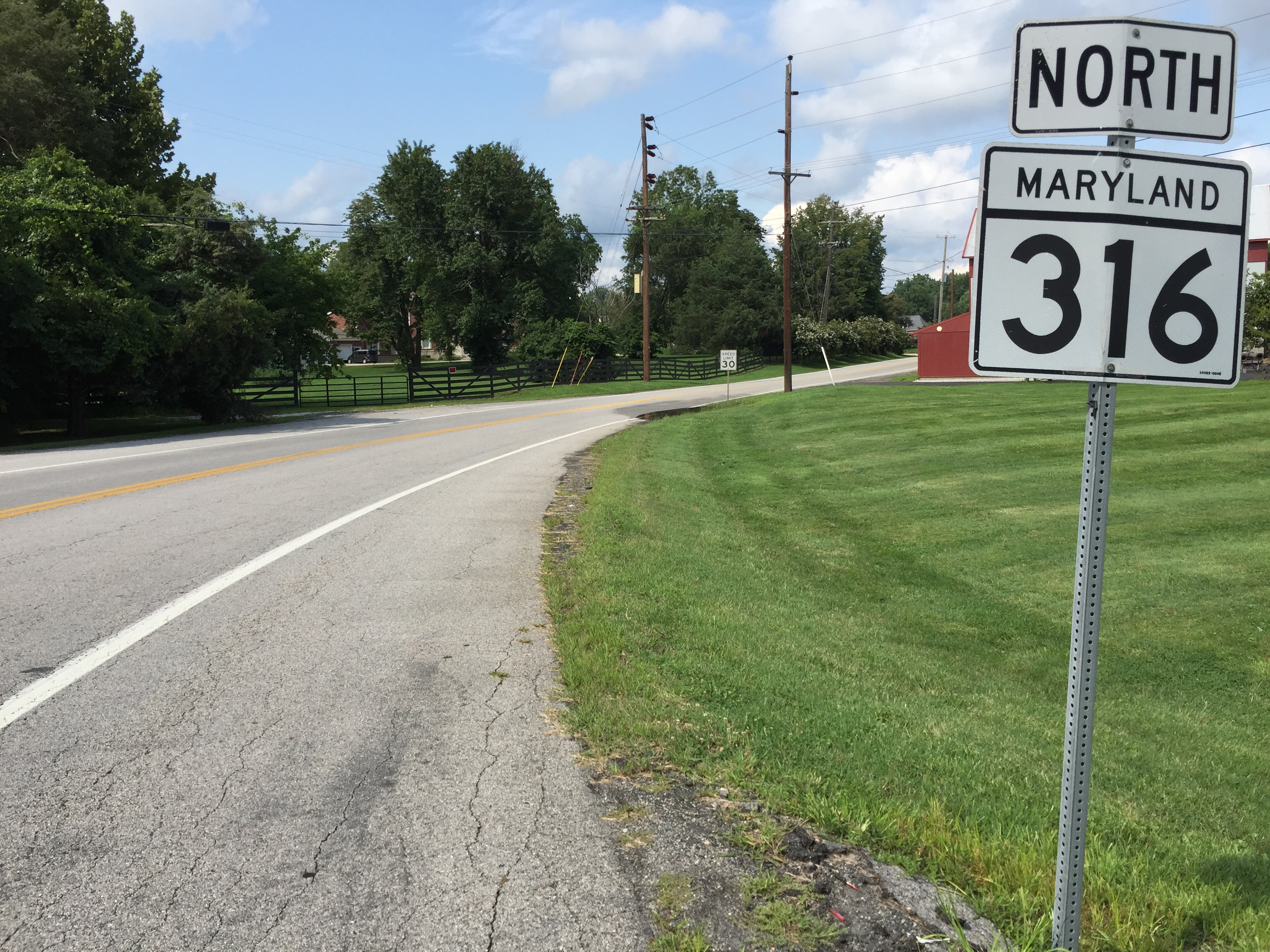
View north along MD 316 at MD 279 near Elkton

MD 316 begins at an intersection with MD 279 (Elkton Road) just outside the town of Elkton and just north of MD 279's crossing of Big Elk Creek. The two-lane undivided highway heads northeast and passes northwest of the Gilpin Manor Memorial Park cemetery, on either side of which the highway crosses a tributary of Big Elk Creek. MD 316 intersects Belle Hill Road, curves north, and crosses over Interstate 95 (John F. Kennedy Memorial Highway) without access. The highway passes west of the Cecil County Farm Museum and the Cecil County School of Technology and follows the eastern edge of the Elk Mills Quarry to its northern terminus at MD 277 near Elk Mills. MD 277 heads west as Elk Mills Road and east as Fletchwood Road; Appleton Road continues north as a county highway toward Appleton in the northeast corner of Cecil County.

== History ==
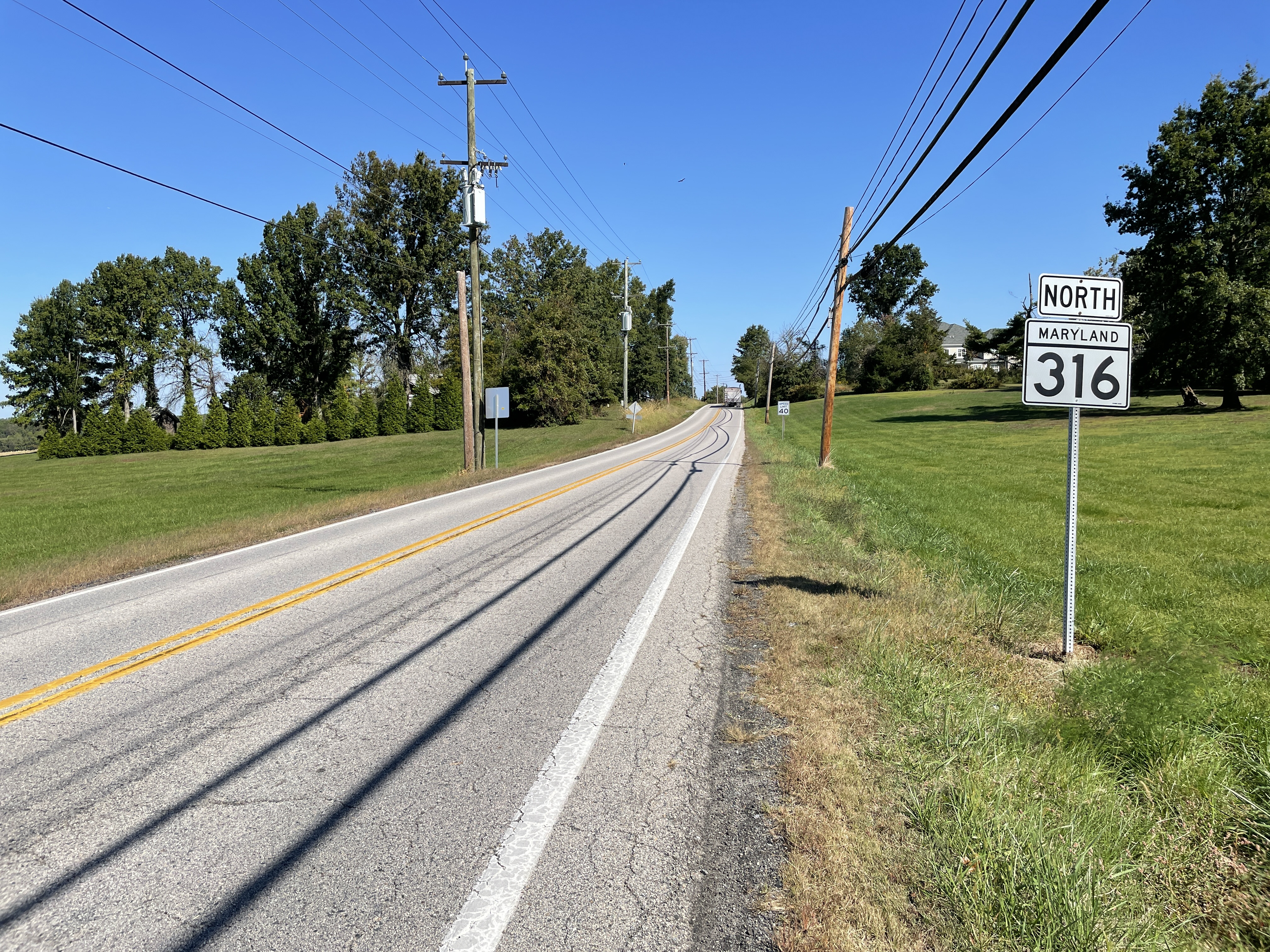
MD 316 northbound near Elkton

The portion of MD 316 between its southern terminus and what is now Belle Hill Road was originally part of MD 279, which continued along Belle Hill Road to its current course. Both the Newark Road and the Barksdale Road, which followed what is now MD 316 north from the Newark Road toward the village of Barksdale north of the Baltimore and Ohio Railroad (B&O Railroad, now CSX's Philadelphia Subdivision), were planned to be built by the state but were instead constructed by Cecil County with state aid. Work on both 14-foot-wide (4.3 m) macadam roads was underway by 1911, and the Barksdale Road was completed to Elk Mills Road by 1915. The Barksdale Road was planned to be extended north through the village of Cowenton in 1917, but those plans were cancelled with the United States' entry into World War I. A disjoint segment of the Barksdale Road was built from the B&O Railroad crossing through Barksdale in 1921 and 1922. This 0.53-mile-long (0.85 km) segment was transferred from state to county maintenance through a June 29, 1964, road transfer agreement. The southern terminus of MD 316 was moved to its present location after MD 279 was moved to its present course from Big Elk Creek to Belle Hill Road in 1962. MD 316 was resurfaced with bituminous concrete in two segments in 1972 and 1973.

== Junction list ==
The entire route is in Cecil County.

Location	mi	km	Destinations	Notes
Elkton	0.00	0.00	MD 279 (Elkton Road) – Newark, DE	Southern terminus
Elk Mills	2.67	4.30	MD 277 (Elk Mills Road/Fletchwood Road) / Appleton Road north – Appleton, Newark, DE	Northern terminus
1.000 mi = 1.609 km; 1.000 km = 0.621 mi
