= Public School No. 111-C =

- U.S. National Register of Historic Places
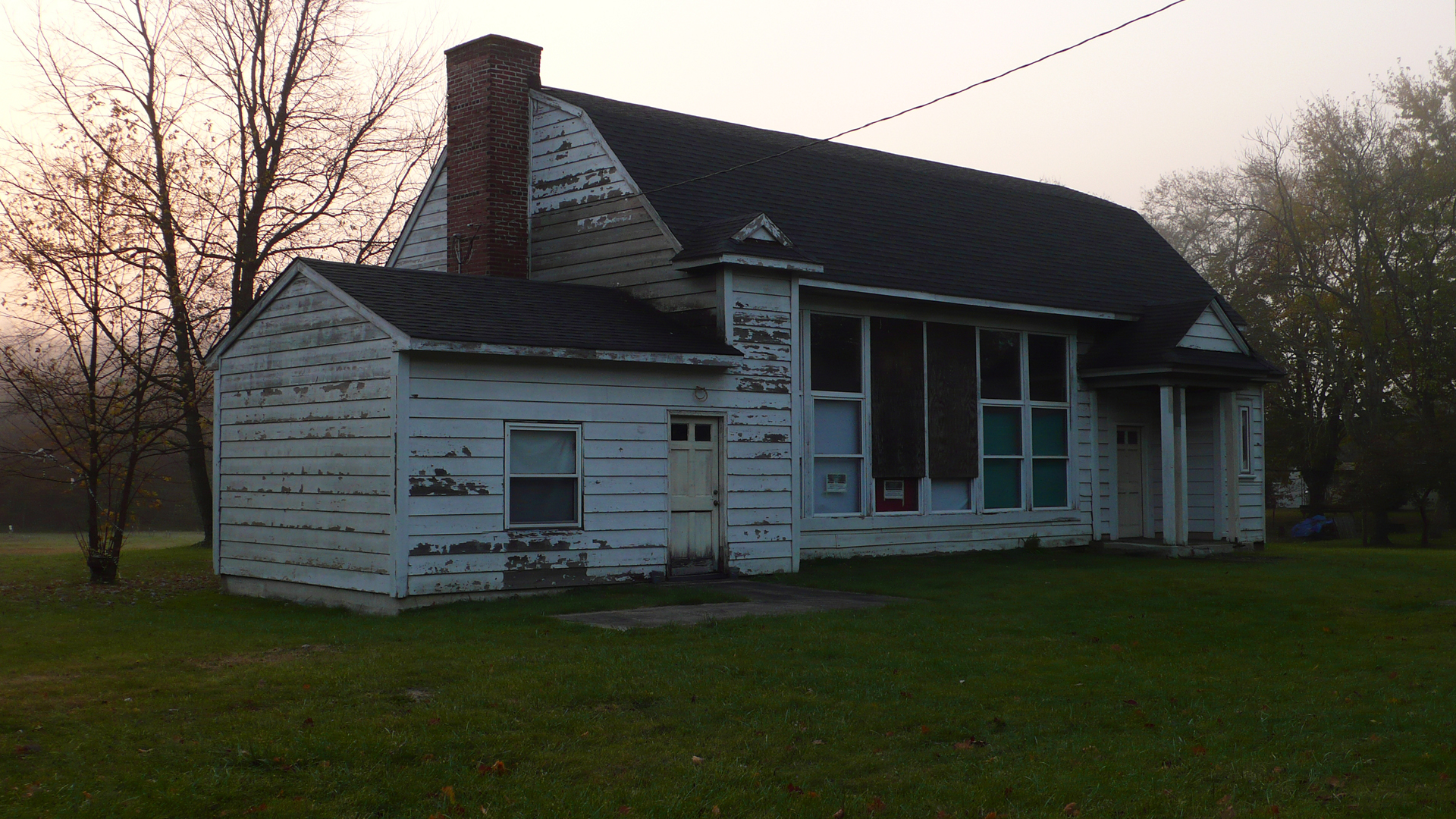
- Public School No. 111-C, November 2012

- Location within Delaware Location within the United States
- Location: 50 N. Old Baltimore Pike, Christiana, Delaware
- Coordinates: 39.66854°N 75.65860°W
- Area: 2 acres (0.81 ha)
- Built: 1920
- Architect: Betelle, James O.
- Architectural style: Colonial Revival
- NRHP reference No.: 79000625
- Added to NRHP: October 18, 1979

Public School No. 111-C is a historic rural school building located at Christiana, New Castle County, Delaware. It was built in 1920 and is an example of schools for African American children built in the 1920s by Progressive Era philanthropist Pierre S. du Pont (1870–1954).

== Building ==
The building consists of a one-story, balloon frame, gambrel-roofed main block containing the classroom with three small wings housing the furnace room, wash rooms and work and lunch room. The building is in the Colonial Revival style. In 1979, it had its original box cornices, but these were no longer present in 2020. The northern wing was rebuilt after a fire occurred in 1990. The building sits on 2 acres (8,100 m^{2}) of land, which served as the school's yard and play area.

== History ==
In the 1920s, Pierre S. du Pont funded the building of a number of schools built for minority students. Delaware schools buildings at the time were outdated, and very few new buildings had been built since the turn of the century. Buildings for black and Native American students were particularly insufficient. Du Pont visited schools himself and saw children attempting to study in crowded, unsanitary buildings with very little teaching equipment.

School No. 111-C was one of the first three of the Du Pont minority schools and resembled a "model" one-teacher school design published in The American Architect on June 16, 1920. It had an experimental design compared to later school. The land was donated by a local couple whose family were some of the first black inhabitants of the area. Construction began on April 20, 1920 and was completed later that year on September 6.

Twenty-eight students were enrolled during its first year. The school operated until 1952 and was thereafter used by the community. A fire occurred on February 1, 1990. It was listed on the National Register of Historic Places in 1979 and is now the location of the Christiana Community Center, which has worked to restore the property.
