= Maryland Route 281 =

State highway in Maryland, United States

Maryland Route 281
- Maryland Route 281 highlighted in red

Route information
- Maintained by MDSHA
- Length: 2.12 mi (3.41 km)
- Existed: 1933–present

Major junctions
- West end: MD 7 in Elkton
- MD 781 near Elkton
- East end: Old Baltimore Pike at the Delaware state line near Elkton

Location
- Country: United States
- State: Maryland
- Counties: Cecil

Highway system
- Maryland highway system; Interstate; US; State; Scenic Byways
← MD 279	→ MD 282

Maryland Route 281 (MD 281) is a state highway in the U.S. state of Maryland. Known for most of its length as Red Hill Road, the state highway runs 2.12 miles (3.41 km) from MD 7 east to the Delaware state line in Elkton in northeastern Cecil County. MD 281 and its continuation in Delaware were originally blazed in the 18th century as part of the Old Post Road between Baltimore and Philadelphia. The route was part of the Elk and Christiana Turnpike in the early 19th century and later the Old Baltimore Pike, but it was replaced as the main highway east from Elkton by U.S. Route 40 (US 40) in the early 20th century. MD 281 was constructed in Elkton in the early 1930s. The highway designation was extended east to the state line in the late 1950s; that extension was reconstructed in the early 1960s.

== Route description ==
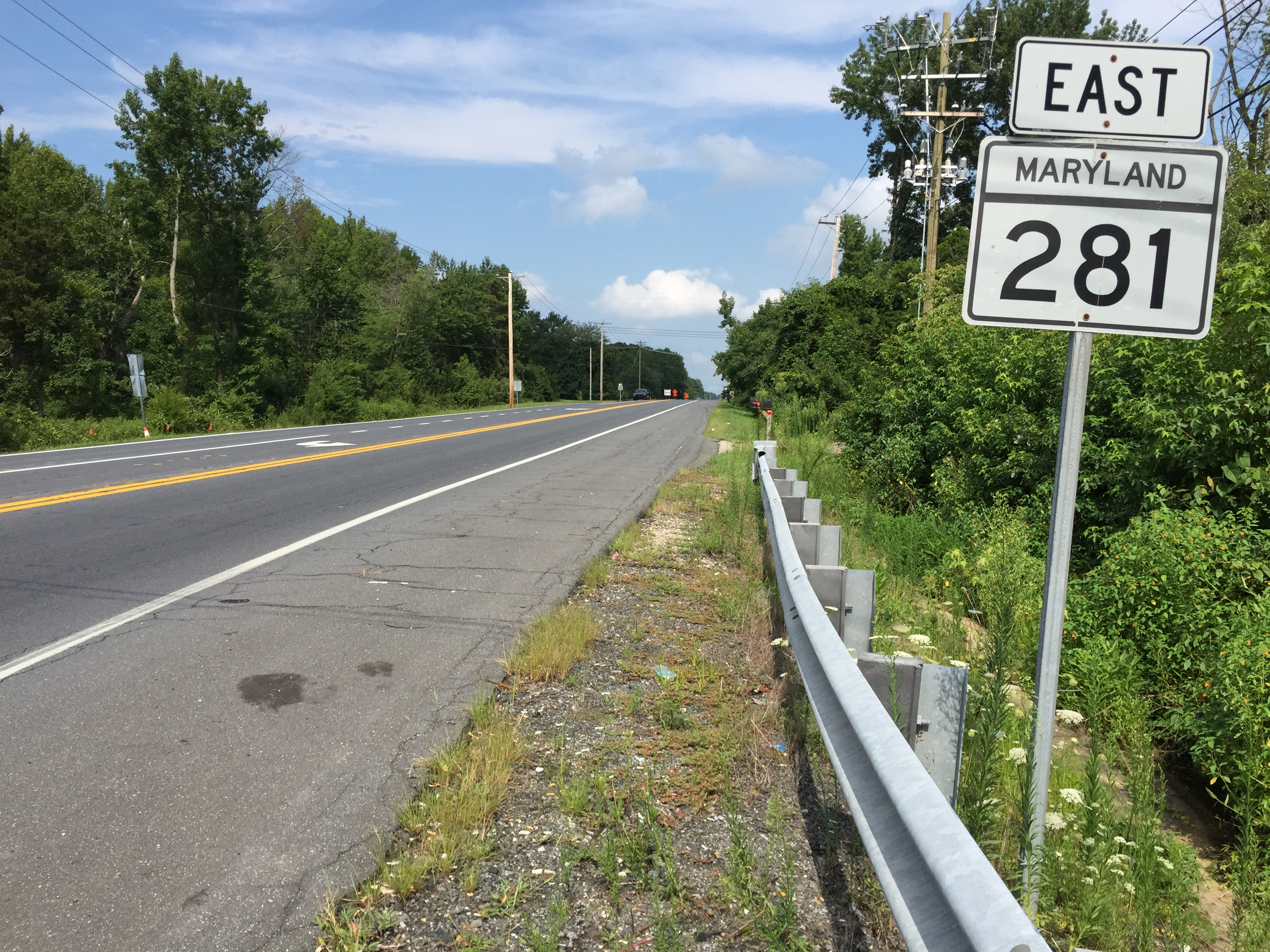
View east along MD 281 at MD 781 near Elkton

MD 281 begins at an intersection with MD 7 in the town of Elkton. MD 7 continues west as Main Street and heads southeast as Delaware Avenue toward US 40. MD 281 heads east as two-lane undivided Main Street and leaves the town by crossing Big Elk Creek. The highway continues as Red Hill Road, which passes to the north of Grays Hill. The road comes to a roundabout with Muddy Lane/Kemp Lane, where it is briefly a divided highway. MD 281 meets the northern end of MD 781 (Delancy Road) before reaching its eastern terminus at the Delaware state line. The highway continues east as Old Baltimore Pike toward Christiana.

== History ==
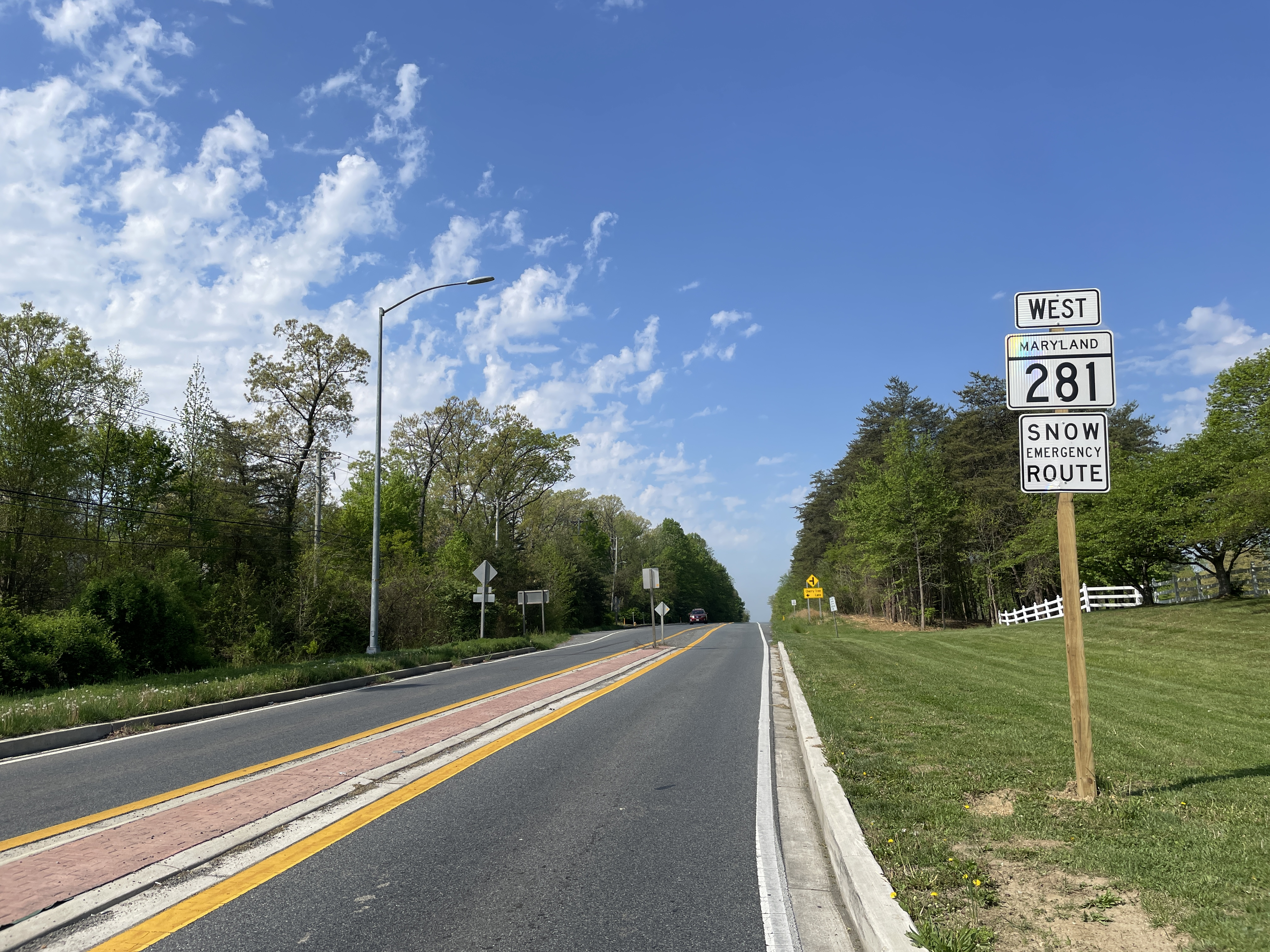
MD 281 westbound past the Kemp Lane/Muddy Lane roundabout near Elkton

What is now MD 281 and its continuation in Delaware was the Old Post Road used to connect Christiana Bridge with the head of the Elk River, and by extension Philadelphia and Baltimore, in the 18th century. Alternatively known as Old Baltimore Pike, this road was part of the Washington–Rochambeau Revolutionary Route used by the French army in September 1781 during their march from Newport, Rhode Island, to Yorktown, Virginia, during the Revolutionary War. In 1817, the Elk and Christiana Turnpike was completed along the path of the Old Post Road; the turnpike operated until 1838, when Old Baltimore Pike reverted to a public road. By the 1920s, the Old Baltimore Pike was supplanted by a parallel highway to the south from Elkton to Wilmington that was chosen as the route of US 40. The first segment of the modern MD 281 was constructed as a macadam road east from US 40 (now MD 7) on Main Street to Big Elk Creek between 1930 and 1933. In 1948, the Maryland State Roads Commission, which at the time maintained the major county highways in Cecil County, reconstructed much of Red Hill Road as a gravel road in 1948 before it was to be given a hard surface. The 1.77 miles (2.85 km) of highway from the west end of the Big Elk Creek bridge along Red Hill Road to the state line was transferred from county to state maintenance through a May 8, 1958, road transfer agreement. MD 281 was reconstructed from Big Elk Creek to the state line in 1960 and 1961; this work included a new four-span, steel beam bridge across Big Elk Creek. The highway was resurfaced with bituminous concrete from MD 7 to Big Elk Creek in 1968 and from the creek to Delaware in 1973. In 2017, construction took place on a $3.1 million project to build a roundabout at Muddy Lane/Kemp Lane; this roundabout opened to traffic in October of that year.

== Junction list ==
The entire route is in Elkton, Cecil County.

mi	km	Destinations	Notes
0.00	0.00	MD 7 (Main Street/Delaware Avenue) – North East, Glasgow, DE	Western terminus
1.78	2.86	MD 781 south (Delancy Road) to US 40	Northern terminus of MD 781
2.12	3.41	Old Baltimore Pike east – Christiana	Delaware state line; eastern terminus
1.000 mi = 1.609 km; 1.000 km = 0.621 mi
