= Maryland Route 277 =

State highway in Maryland, United States

Maryland Route 277
- Maryland Route 277 highlighted in red

Route information
- Maintained by MDSHA
- Length: 2.51 mi (4.04 km)
- Existed: 1927–present

Major junctions
- West end: Elk Mills Road in Elk Mills
- MD 316 near Elk Mills
- East end: MD 279 near Elkton

Location
- Country: United States
- State: Maryland
- Counties: Cecil

Highway system
- Maryland highway system; Interstate; US; State; Scenic Byways
| ← MD 276 | → MD 279 |

Maryland Route 277 (MD 277) is a state highway in the U.S. state of Maryland. The highway runs 2.51 miles (4.04 km) from Elk Mills east to MD 279 near Elkton in northeastern Cecil County. MD 277 was constructed west of MD 316 in the early 1920s. The highway was planned to be extended in both directions in the late 1940s. However, neither extension occurred until MD 277 was extended east to MD 279 in the mid-1980s.

== Route description ==
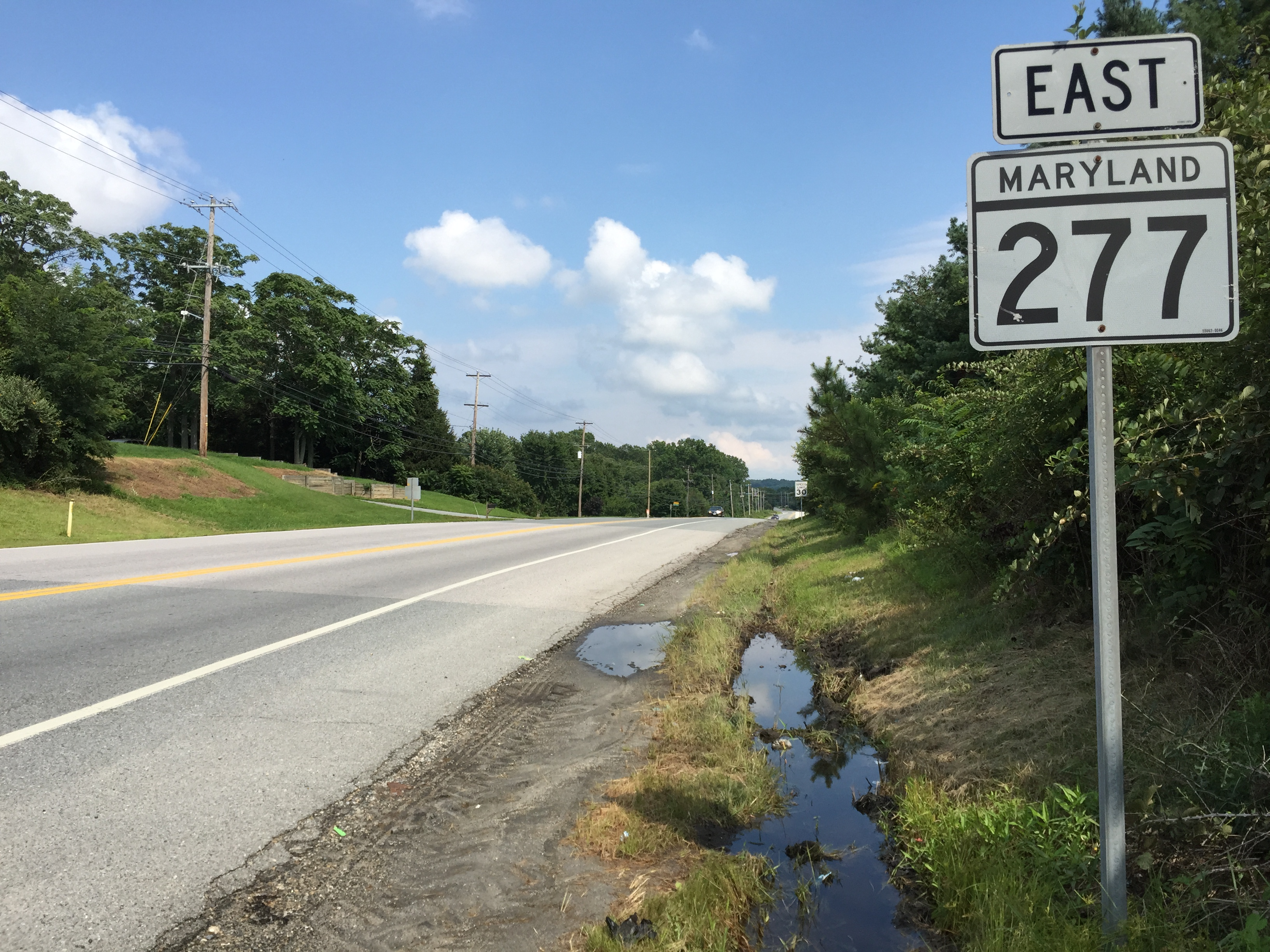
View east along MD 277 at MD 316 near Elk Mills

MD 277 begins at an arbitrary point on Elk Mills Road in the community of Elk Mills about 0.05 miles (0.080 km) west of the entrance to Elk Mills Community Park located north of the road. Elk Mills Road continues west as a county highway toward MD 213. MD 277 heads east as a two-lane undivided road through residential areas of the community and has a grade crossing of CSX's Philadelphia Subdivision railroad line. The highway crosses over Big Elk Creek and passes along the northern edge of the Elk Mills Quarry before intersecting Appleton Road, which heads south as MD 316 and north as a county highway. MD 277 continues east as Fletchwood Road through suburban areas and woods, passing to the north of warehouses. The route briefly parallels the West Branch Christina River as the river passes through Fletchwood Community Park located north of the road. The highway reaches its eastern terminus at MD 279 (Elkton Road) northeast of the town of Elkton and just west of the Delaware state line.

== History ==
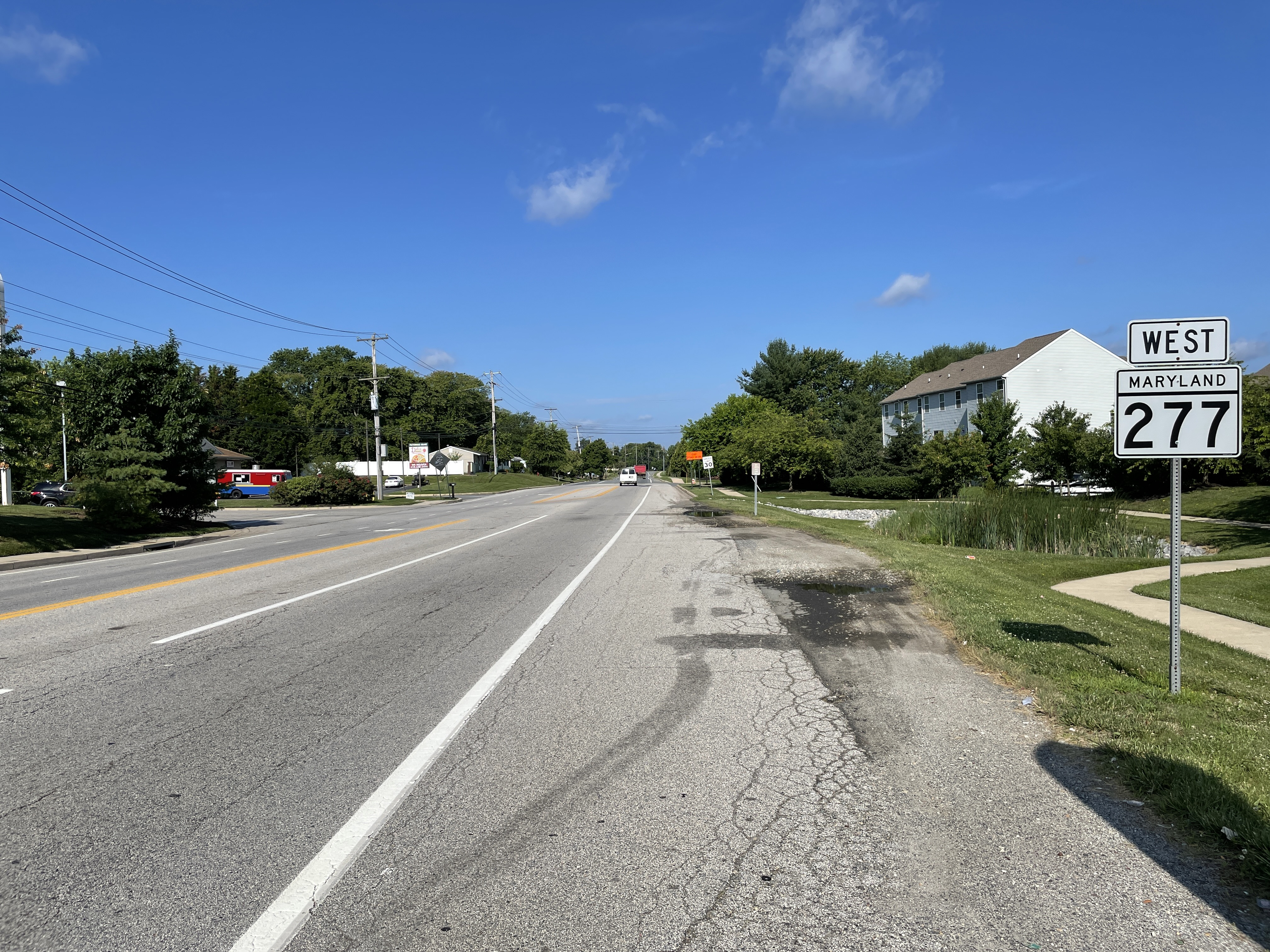
MD 277 westbound past eastern terminus at MD 279 near Elkton

Elk Mills Road was constructed as a 15-foot-wide (4.6 m) concrete road from Appleton Road (then named Barksdale Road) to the current western terminus in 1921. By 1934, MD 277 was proposed to be widened from 15 to 20 feet (4.6 to 6.1 m). In 1945, Cecil County requested the highway be extended west to MD 280 (now MD 213) and east to MD 279 in the first year of a three-year post–World War II construction program. The extensions of MD 277 were planned to be placed under contract in 1947. However, the highway from MD 316 to MD 279 was later proposed to be paved by the state but remain a county highway, and the highway west to MD 280 disappeared from improvement plans. MD 277's old bridge across Big Elk Creek was replaced with a steel beam bridge in 1968, and the highway was paved with bituminous concrete in 1973. Almost 40 years after it was proposed, MD 277 was extended east to MD 279 when Fletchwood Road was transferred from county maintenance in a May 16, 1984, road transfer agreement. The Fletchwood Road portion of the highway was reconstructed between 1990 and 1992.

== Junction list ==
The entire route is in Cecil County.

| Location | mi | km | Destinations | Notes |
|---|---|---|---|---|
| Elk Mills | 0.00 | 0.00 | Elk Mills Road west | Western terminus |
| Elk Mills | 1.19 | 1.92 | MD 316 south (Appleton Road) / Appleton Road north – Elkton | Northern terminus of MD 316 |
| | 2.51 | 4.04 | MD 279 (Elkton Road) – Elkton, Newark, DE | Eastern terminus |
1.000 mi = 1.609 km; 1.000 km = 0.621 mi
