= Maryland Route 279 =

State highway in Maryland, United States

Maryland Route 279
- Maryland Route 279 highlighted in red

Route information
- Maintained by MDSHA
- Length: 4.95 mi (7.97 km)
- Existed: 1927–present

Major junctions
- South end: US 40 / MD 7 near Elkton
- MD 545 in Elkton; MD 213 in Elkton; MD 268 in Elkton; MD 316 near Elkton; I-95 near Elkton; MD 277 near Elkton
- North end: DE 279 near Elkton

Location
- Country: United States
- State: Maryland
- Counties: Cecil

Highway system
- Maryland highway system; Interstate; US; State; Scenic Byways
← MD 277	→ MD 281

Maryland Route 279 (MD 279) is a state highway in the U.S. state of Maryland. Known for most of its length as Elkton Road, the highway runs 4.95 miles (7.97 km) from U.S. Route 40 (US 40) and MD 7 west of Elkton northeast to the Delaware state line north of Elkton in northeastern Cecil County. At the state line, the highway continues as Delaware Route 279 (DE 279). MD 279 functions as a northern bypass of Elkton and is the primary highway to Newark, Delaware, from Maryland. The road has an interchange with Interstate 95 (I-95) northeast of Elkton. The state highway was originally constructed in the early 1910s. MD 279 was reconstructed and placed on a new course north of Elkton in the early 1960s. MD 279 bypassed the center of Elkton with an extension to US 40 in the late 1960s; the old alignment to downtown Elkton was designated MD 268.

== Route description ==
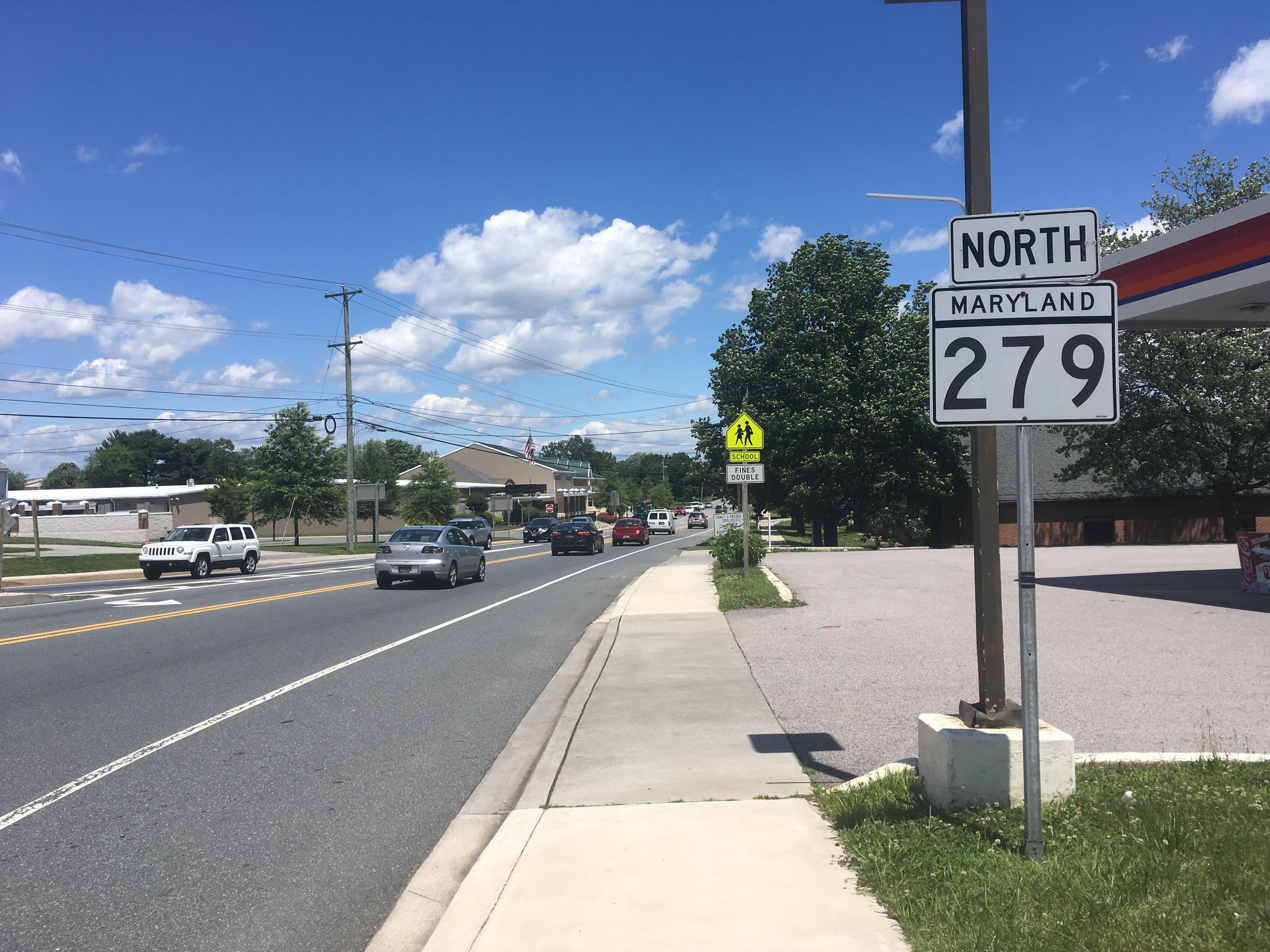
MD 279 northbound past MD 213 in Elkton

MD 279 begins at an intersection with US 40 (Pulaski Highway) west of the town of Elkton. MD 7 (Philadelphia Road) heads south and west from the opposite side of the intersection. MD 279 heads northeast as two-lane divided Elkton Road, which becomes undivided before it crosses Little Elk Creek and enters the town limits of Elkton. The highway intersects MD 545 (Blue Ball Road) and curves to the east ahead of the junction with MD 213 (Bridge Street). MD 279 continues east as Newark Avenue, which has a center left-turn lane and passes between Elkton High School to the north and the adjacent Gilpin Manor Elementary School and Elkton Middle School to the south. The highway becomes a four-lane divided Elkton Road at its intersection with the northern terminus of MD 268 (North Street), after which the route crosses Big Elk Creek, leaves the town limits of Elkton, and immediately meets the southern terminus of MD 316 (Appleton Road). MD 279 turns into an undivided road before it continues northeast as a four-lane divided highway. The state highway heads into a business area and intersects Belle Hill Road, which provides access to a park and ride lot to the east of the road, before meeting I-95 (John F. Kennedy Memorial Highway) at a cloverleaf interchange and crossing Persimmon Run. MD 279 intersects the eastern terminus of MD 277 (Fletchwood Road) immediately before reaching its northern terminus at the Delaware state line. The highway continues northeast as DE 279 toward the city of Newark.

MD 279 is a part of the National Highway System as a principal arterial for its entire length.

== History ==
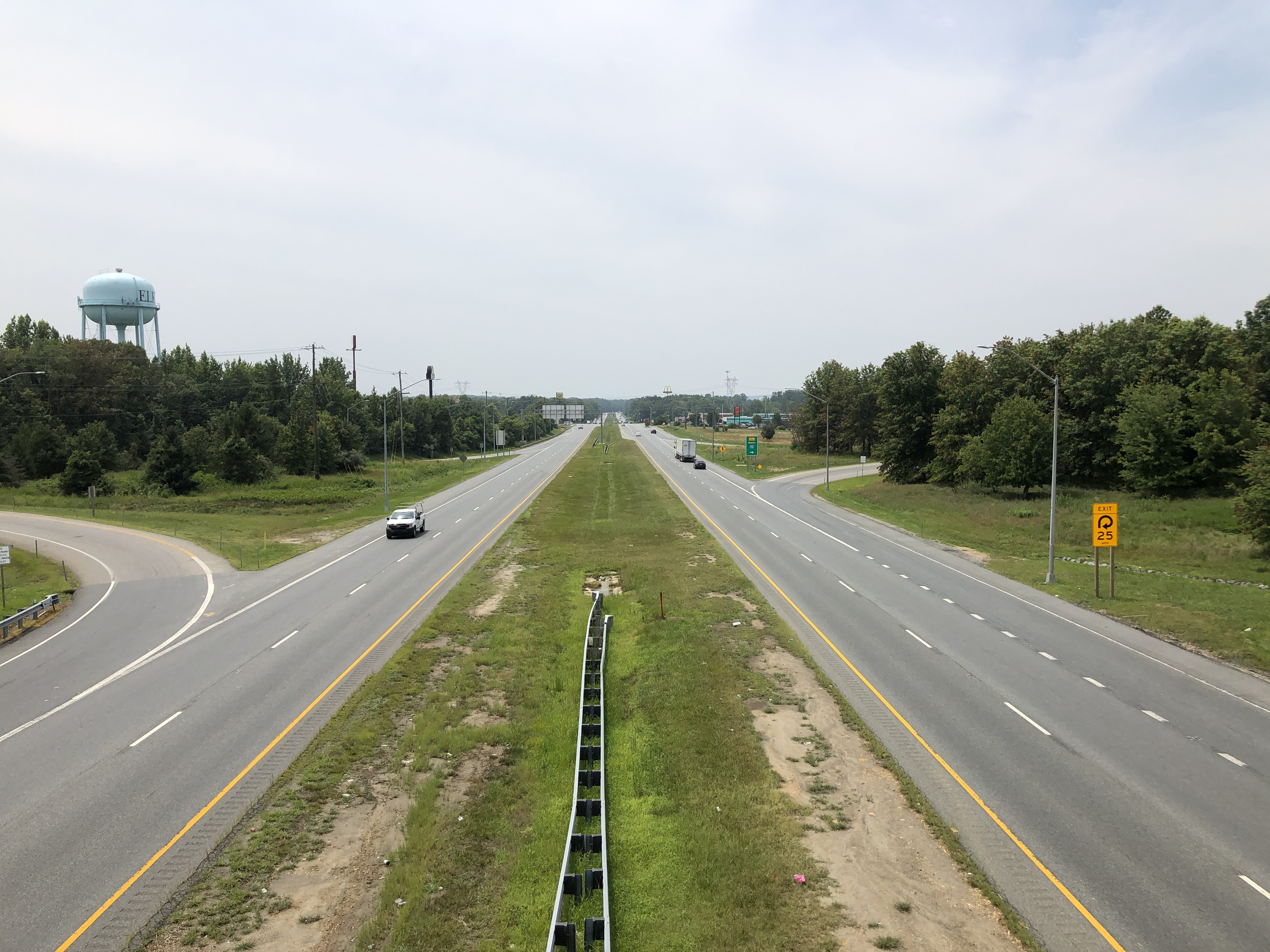
View south along MD 279 from I-95 just north of Elkton

MD 279's original route included North Street in Elkton, what is now MD 316 from Big Elk Creek to Belle Hill Road, and Belle Hill Road to connect with the present course of the state highway. The Newark Road was planned to be built by the state but was instead constructed by Cecil County with state aid. Work on the 14-foot-wide (4.3 m) macadam road from the Elkton town limits at Big Elk Creek to the Delaware state line was underway by 1911 and completed in 1915. This work included reconstructing the concrete arch bridge across Big Elk Creek in 1913. North Street in Elkton was paved as a 15-foot-wide (4.6 m) concrete road by 1921. By this point, the road was part of the Capitol Trail, connecting Atlanta and Philadelphia via Washington, D.C. The North Street bridge across the Pennsylvania Railroad (now Amtrak's Northeast Corridor) was constructed between 1930 and 1934. The split segments of North Street leading to the former grade crossing of the railroad were later designated sections of MD 727. North Street was resurfaced with bituminous concrete as part of a 1950 project to resurface Elkton streets that were part of state highways.

MD 279 was entirely reconstructed starting in the late 1950s. The highway's concrete arch bridge across Big Elk Creek was replaced with a prestressed concrete box girder bridge in 1958 and 1959. MD 279's present course between Big Elk Creek and Belle Hill Road was constructed and in 1959 and 1960 and surfaced with bituminous concrete in 1962. The old portion of MD 279 was replaced with a southern extension of MD 316 on Appleton Road and by MD 823 on Belle Hill Road. The highway from Belle Hill Road to the Delaware state line was reconstructed concurrent with the construction of I-95 in 1962 and 1963. Newark Avenue between MD 280 (now MD 213) and North Street was brought into the state highway system through a June 29, 1964, road transfer agreement with the county. Finally, Newark Avenue was reconstructed and the portion of MD 279 between US 40 and MD 280 was constructed between 1966 and 1968. The bypassed portion of MD 279 along North Street became MD 268. MD 279 was expanded to a four-lane divided highway from MD 316 to the Delaware state line between 1981 and 1983. The highway's junction with I-95 was originally constructed as a diamond interchange. The junction was expanded to a cloverleaf interchange between 1984 and 1993.

== Junction list ==
The entire route is in Cecil County.

Location	mi	km	Destinations	Notes
	0.00	0.00	US 40 (Pulaski Highway) / MD 7 west (Old Philadelphia Road) – Philadelphia, Baltimore	Southern terminus; eastern terminus of MD 7C
Elkton	0.60	0.97	MD 545 (Blue Ball Road) – Childs, Pleasant Hill, Elkton	
Elkton	1.18	1.90	MD 213 (Bridge Street) – Cherry Hill, Elkton	
Elkton	1.70	2.74	MD 268 south (North Street)	Northern terminus of MD 268
	1.80	2.90	MD 316 north (Appleton Road) – Elk Mills	Southern terminus of MD 316
	3.81	6.13	I-95 (John F. Kennedy Memorial Highway) – Baltimore, New York	I-95 Exit 109
	4.91	7.90	MD 277 west (Fletchwood Road) – Elk Mills	Eastern terminus of MD 277
	4.95	7.97	DE 279 north (Elkton Road) – Newark	Delaware state line; northern terminus
1.000 mi = 1.609 km; 1.000 km = 0.621 mi
