= Old Fort Church =

Historic church in Delaware, United States

- U.S. National Register of Historic Places
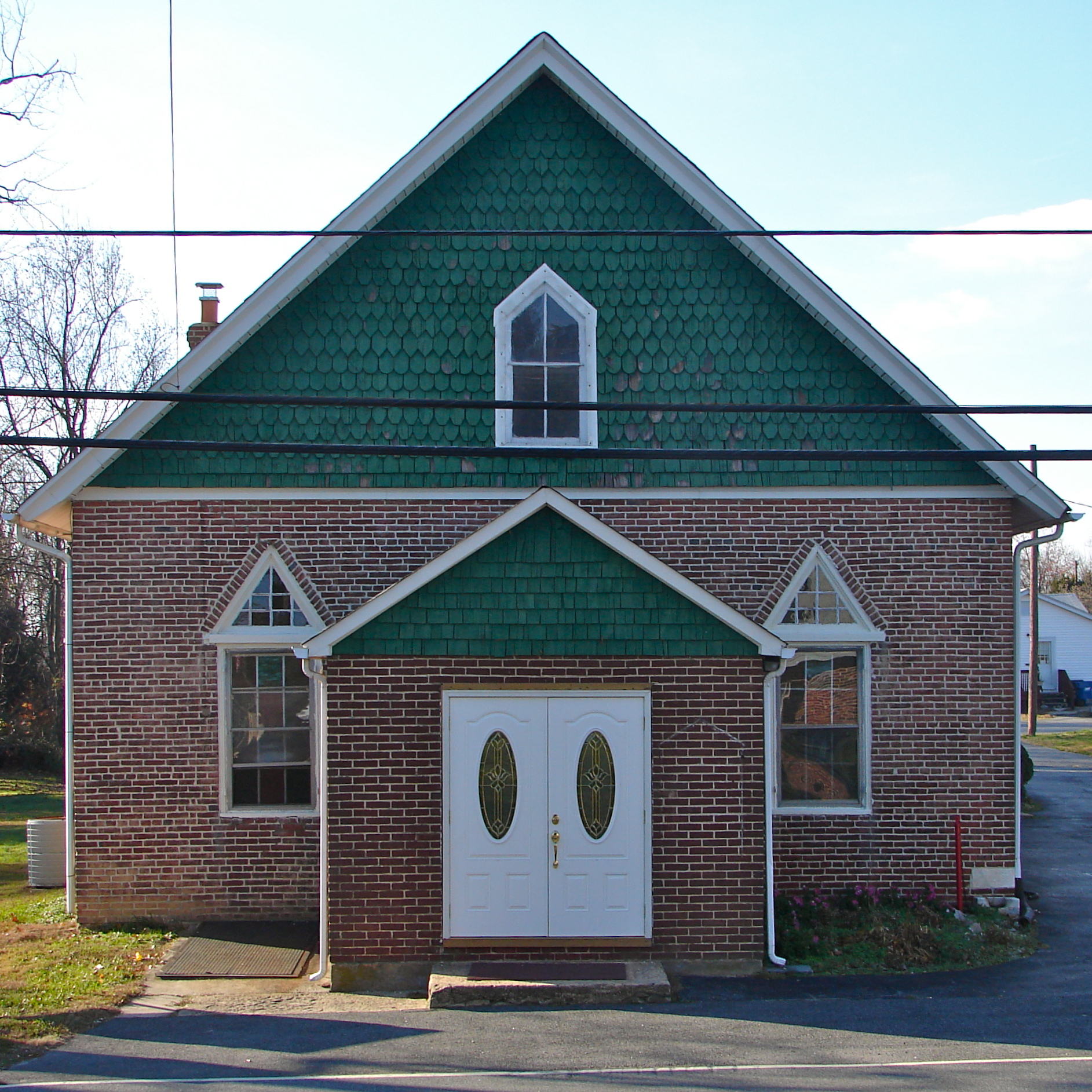
- Old Fort Church, November 2010

- Location within Delaware Location within the United States
- Location: 37 N. Old Baltimore Pike, Christiana, Delaware
- Coordinates: 39.66786°N 75.65929°W
- Area: 0.4 acres (0.16 ha)
- Built: 1897
- MPS: White Clay Creek Hundred MRA
- NRHP reference No.: 83001402
- Added to NRHP: August 19, 1983

Old Fort Church is an historic African-American Methodist church located on Old Baltimore Pike in Christiana, New Castle County, Delaware. The church was originally built on Schoolbell Road (in Christiana Hundred) near Christiana in 1850. In 1897, it was dismantled and reconstructed on its present site. It is a one-story, three bay by three bay, gable-roofed brick structure. It features modified lancet-type windows that illuminate the main block. The gable ends have various types of decorative wood shingles painted dark green.

It was added to the National Register of Historic Places in 1983.

== Gallery ==
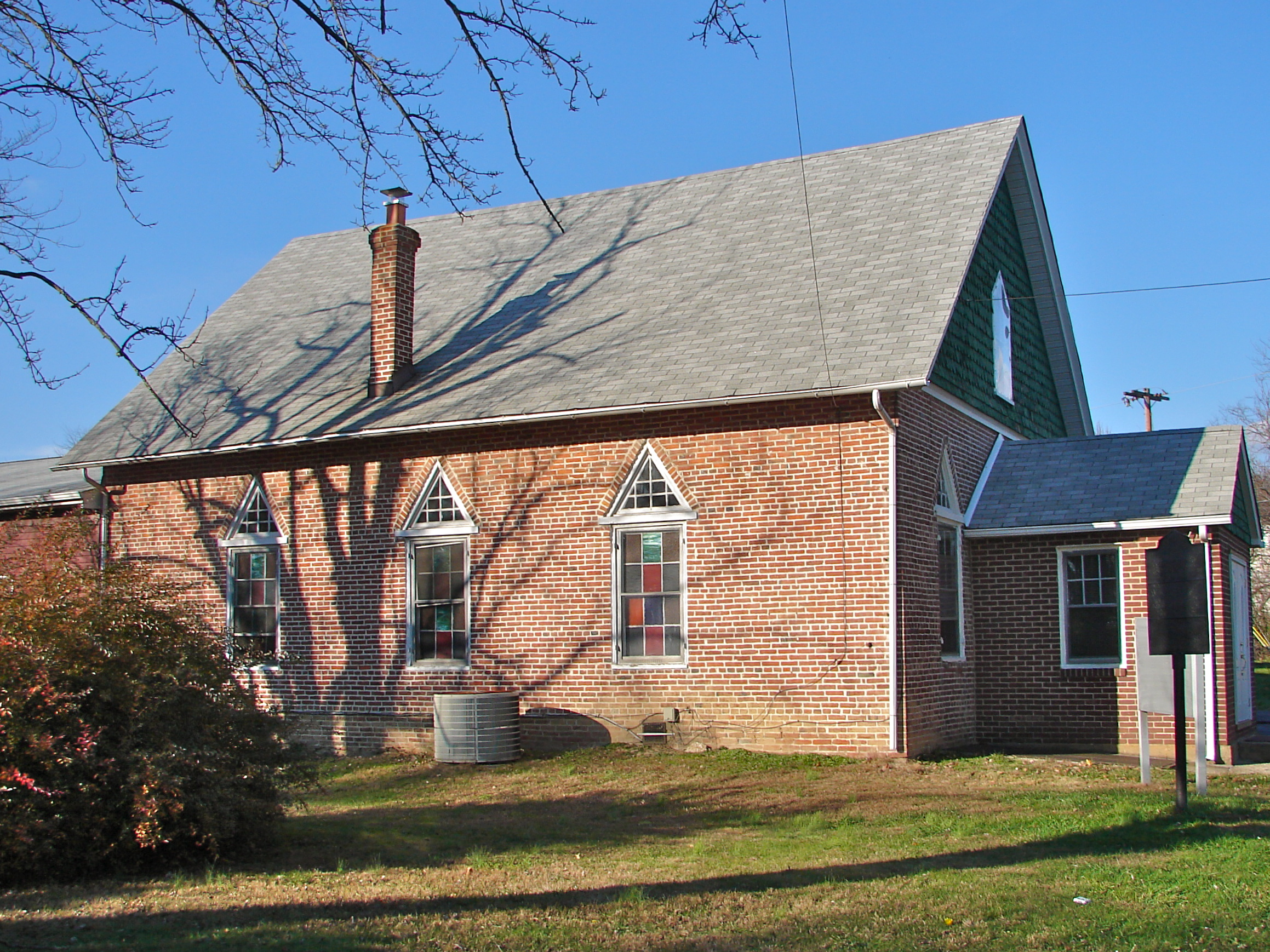
View from the south
