= Maryland Route 781 =

State highway in Maryland, United States

Maryland Route 781
- Delancy Road

Route information
- Maintained by MDSHA
- Length: 1.01 mi (1.63 km)
- Existed: 1984–present

Major junctions
- South end: US 40 in Elkton
- North end: MD 281 in Elkton

Location
- Country: United States
- State: Maryland
- Counties: Cecil

Highway system
- Maryland highway system; Interstate; US; State; Scenic Byways
← MD 779	→ MD 783

Maryland Route 781 (MD 781) is a state highway in the U.S. state of Maryland. Known as Delancy Road, the state highway runs 1.01 miles (1.63 km) from U.S. Route 40 (US 40) north to MD 281 in Elkton close to the Delaware state line. Delancy Road was brought into the state highway system as MD 781 in 1984.

== Route description ==
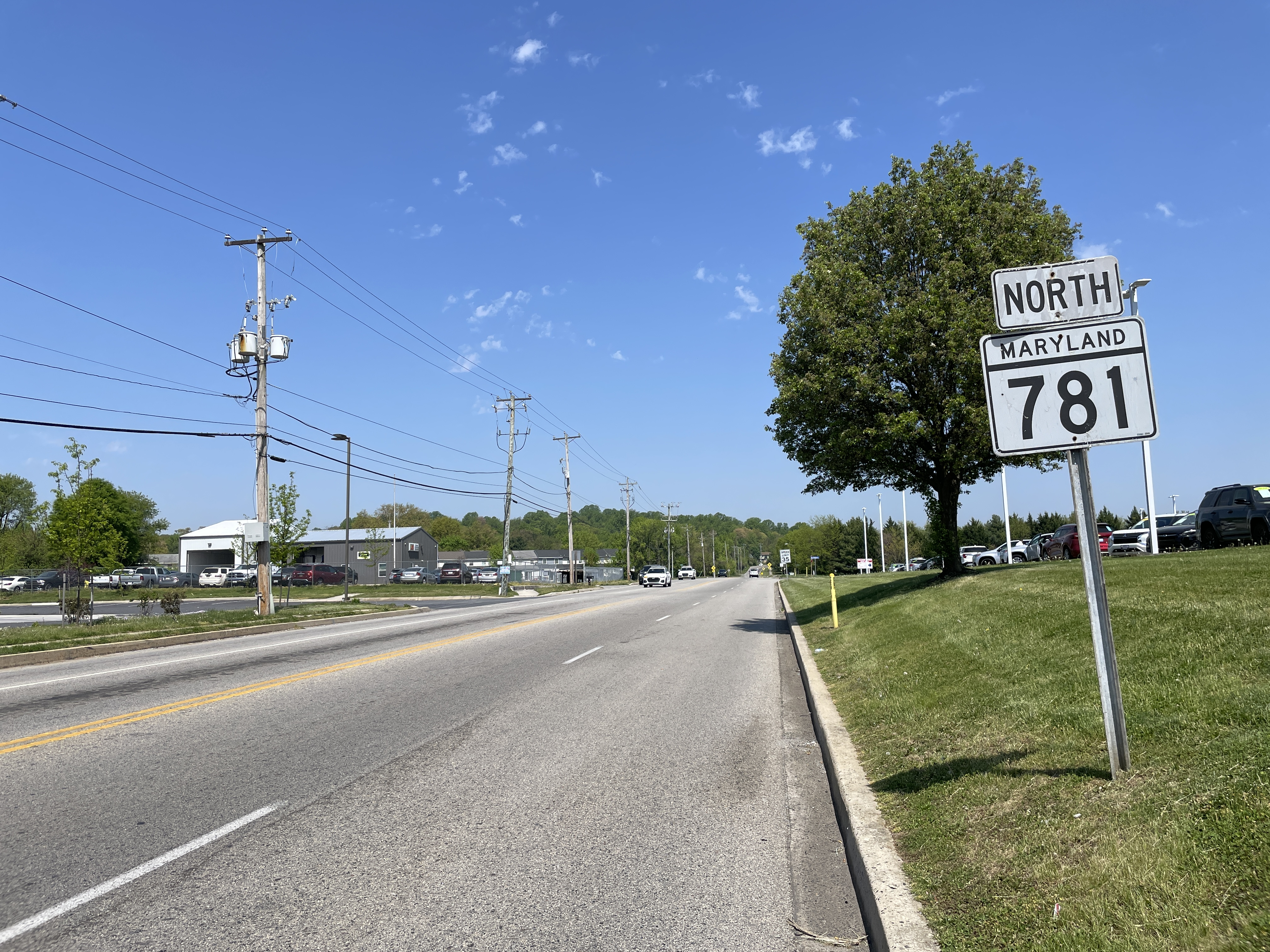
View north along MD 781 at US 40 in Elkton

MD 781 begins at an intersection with US 40 (Pulaski Highway) in the town of Elkton 0.23 miles (0.37 km) west of the U.S. Highway's crossing of the Delaware state line. The highway heads north as a two-lane undivided road to the west of the state line and to the east of Grays Hill. MD 781 leaves the town of Elkton about halfway through its course, but the route follows a finger of unincorporated area between sections of the town to its northern terminus. That terminus is at MD 281 (Red Hill Road) 0.34 miles (0.55 km) west of that highway's crossing of the state line.

== History ==
Delancy Road long predates being a part of the state highway system, the road having existed since at least 1898. The highway was designated MD 781 in December 1984 after being transferred from county to state maintenance in a May 16, 1984, road transfer agreement.

== Junction list ==
The entire route is in Elkton, Cecil County.

mi	km	Destinations	Notes
0.00	0.00	US 40 (Pulaski Highway) – Baltimore, Glasgow, DE	Southern terminus
1.01	1.63	MD 281 (Red Hill Road) – Elkton, Christiana, DE	Northern terminus
1.000 mi = 1.609 km; 1.000 km = 0.621 mi
