= Delaware Route 279 =

State highway in Newark, Delaware, United States

Delaware Route 279
- Elkton Road

Route information
- Maintained by DelDOT
- Length: 1.05 mi (1.69 km)
- Existed: 2013–present

Major junctions
- South end: MD 279 in Newark
- North end: DE 4 / DE 896 in Newark

Location
- Country: United States
- State: Delaware
- Counties: New Castle

Highway system
- Delaware State Route System; List; Byways
← DE 273	→ DE 286

Delaware Route 279 (DE 279) is a 1.05-mile (1.69 km) long state highway located in northern New Castle County, Delaware. It is signed north-south and runs from the Maryland state line southwest of Newark, where the road continues as Maryland Route 279 (MD 279), northeast to DE 4 and DE 896 in Newark. DE 279 follows a four-lane divided highway called Elkton Road and serves as part of the route connecting Elkton, Maryland with Newark. The roadway is maintained by the Delaware Department of Transportation (DelDOT). DE 279 was originally the westernmost portion of DE 2, designated in the 1930s. This portion of road was widened into a divided highway in 1972. In 2013, DE 2 was truncated from the Maryland state line to east of Newark to simplify the route designations through Newark, resulting in DE 279 being designated to its current alignment.

== Route description ==
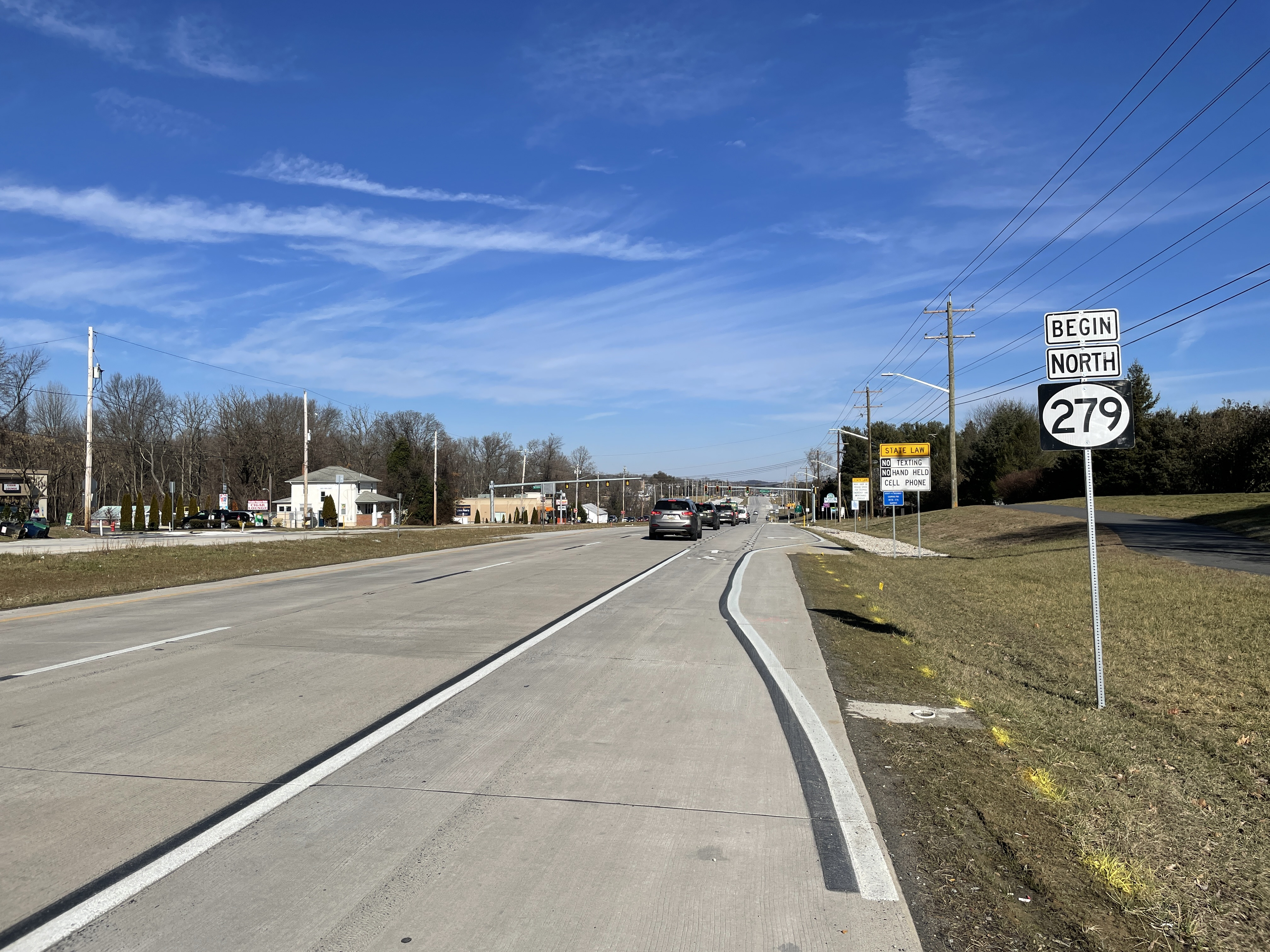
The beginning of DE 279 northbound at MD 279 at the Maryland border in Newark

DE 279 begins at the Maryland state line southwest of the city of Newark. The road continues southwest into that state as MD 279, which heads toward the town of Elkton. From the state line, the route heads northeast on Elkton Road, a four-lane divided highway. DE 279 heads through commercial areas of Newark, where it passes north of the Newark Charter School and crosses the West Branch Christina River before it comes to a junction with Otts Chapel Road. The road continues past more commercial development and reaches an intersection with the western terminus of DE 4 and DE 896 (Christiana Parkway). Here, DE 279 ends and Elkton Road continues northeast as part of DE 896 toward downtown Newark. The entire length of the route is located in New Castle County. The route passes through flat to gently rolling terrain at an elevation of about 100 feet (30 m).

DE 279 has an annual average daily traffic count of 30,155 vehicles west of Otts Chapel Road and 14,214 vehicles east of Otts Chapel Road. The entire length of DE 279 is part of the National Highway System.

== History ==
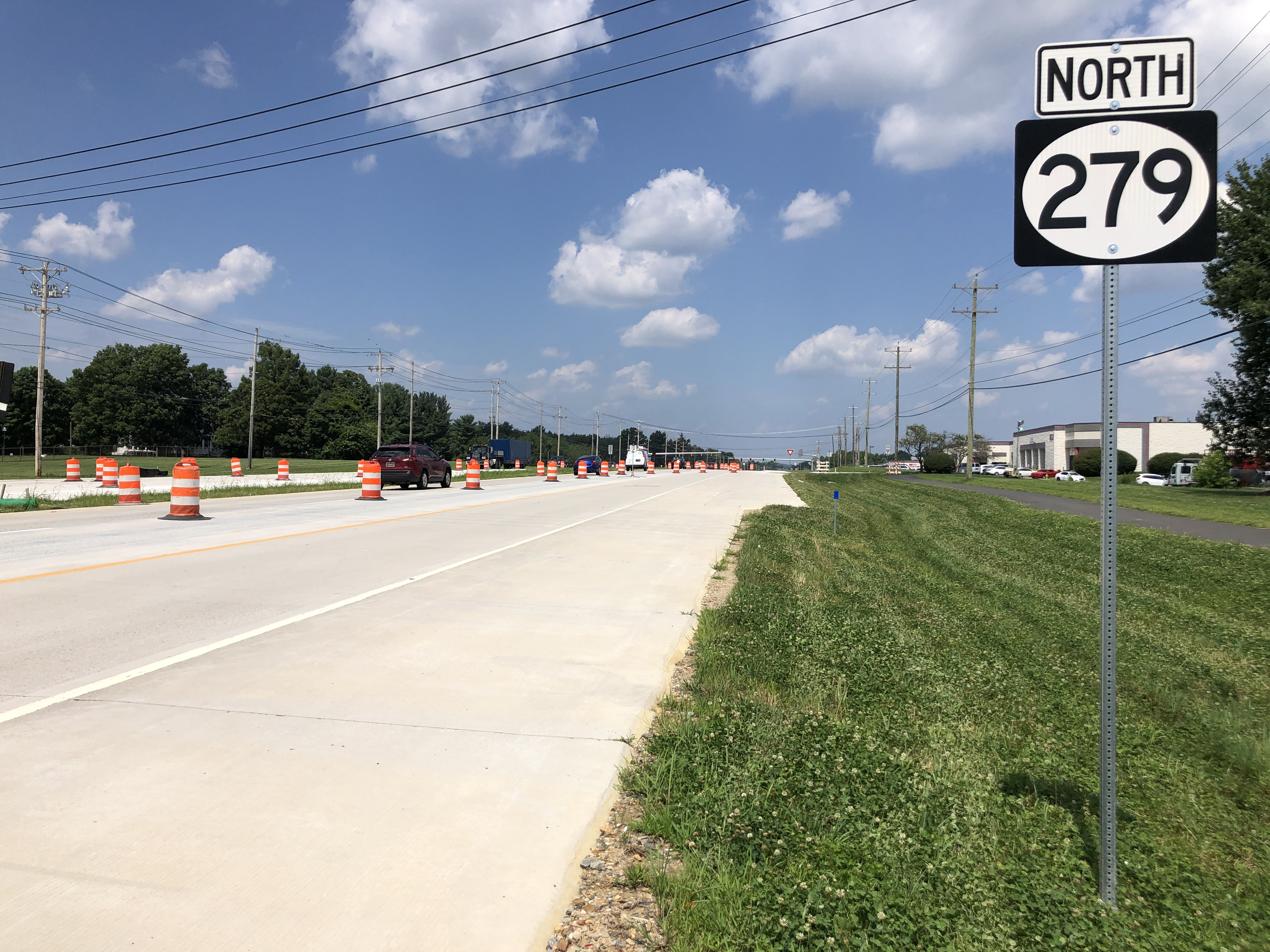
DE 279 northbound past Otts Chapel Road in Newark

What is now DE 279 was originally an unimproved county road. From the 1910s to the 1938, it was part of a branch of the Lincoln Highway, and part of the Capitol Trail, which ran from Atlanta through Washington, D.C., passing through Delaware by way of Newark, Wilmington, and Claymont, before terminating in Philadelphia. By 1924, the road was paved. In 1925, suggestions were made for the state to take over maintenance of the highway connecting the Maryland state line to Newark. In 1927, the state took over maintenance of the highway between the Maryland state line and Newark. When Delaware designated its state highways by 1936, the current alignment of DE 279 was designated as the westernmost part of DE 2, which ran from the Maryland state line through Newark and continued east to Wilmington. The portion of DE 2 along Elkton Road between the Maryland state line and Newark was widened into a divided highway in 1972. In 2013, DelDOT proposed the renumbering of routes in and around Newark, which involved truncating DE 2 from the Maryland state line to the eastern edge of Newark and the removal of DE 2 Bus. through downtown Newark. As a result of these changes, the portion of Elkton Road between the Maryland state line and DE 4/DE 896 (Christiana Parkway) was to be designated as DE 279, matching the route number across the Maryland state line. The goal of the project was to "simplify the route designations in Newark, reduce sign clutter, and reduce sign maintenance costs." The changes were completed in the middle part of 2013.

== Major intersections ==
The entire route is in Newark, New Castle County.

mi	km	Destinations	Notes
0.00	0.00	MD 279 south (Elkton Road)	Maryland state line; southern terminus
1.05	1.69	DE 4 east / DE 896 (Christiana Parkway/Elkton Road) – University of Delaware	Northern terminus; western terminus of DE 4
1.000 mi = 1.609 km; 1.000 km = 0.621 mi
