= Christiana Historic District =

Historic district in Delaware, United States

- U.S. National Register of Historic Places
- U.S. Historic district
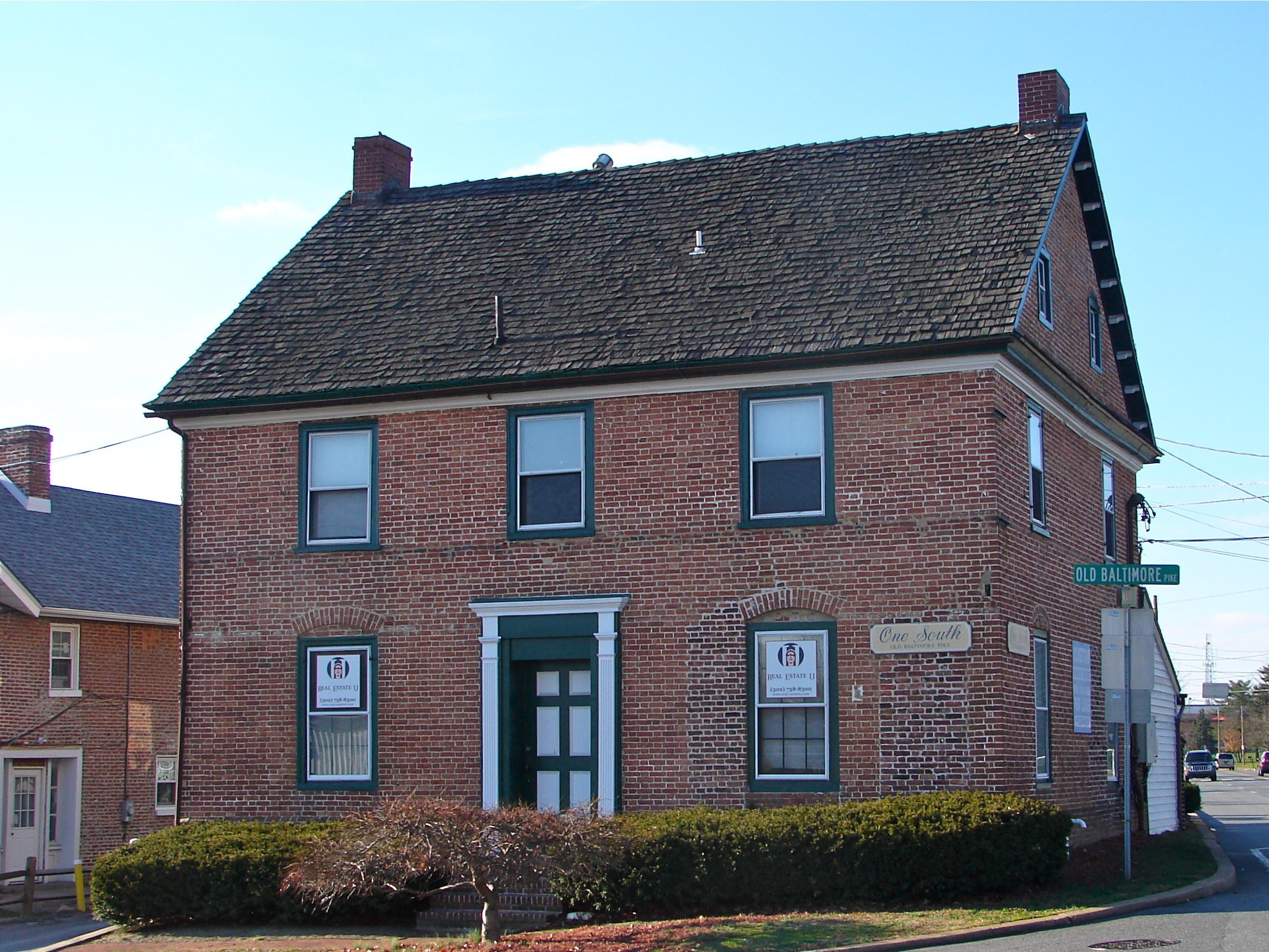
- House in the Christiana Historic District, November 2010

- Location within Delaware Location within the United States
- Location: Jct. of DE 7 and 273, Christiana, Delaware
- Coordinates: 39°39′55″N 75°39′36″W
- Area: 20 acres (8.1 ha)
- Built: 1780
- Architectural style: Georgian, Gothic Revival, Federal
- NRHP reference No.: 74000600
- Added to NRHP: December 16, 1974

Christiana Historic District is a national historic district located at Christiana, New Castle County, Delaware. It encompasses nine contributing buildings. They include: Brinkle-Maxwell House (c. 1786), Jones Mansion House Lot (c. 1752), Christiana Presbyterian Church (1757), Joel Lewis House (c. 1799), Christiana Methodist Episcopal Church (1858), Christiana Inn (c. 1770), Hillis Mansion House ( c.1750)and Shannon Hotel.

It was listed on the National Register of Historic Places in 1974.
