= Maryland Route 545 =

State highway in Maryland, United States

Maryland Route 545
- Maryland Route 545 highlighted in red

Route information
- Maintained by MDSHA
- Length: 5.92 mi (9.53 km)
- Existed: 1933–present

Major junctions
- South end: MD 213 in Elkton
- MD 279 in Elkton
- North end: Kirk Road / Warburton Road at Pleasant Hill

Location
- Country: United States
- State: Maryland
- Counties: Cecil

Highway system
- Maryland highway system; Interstate; US; State; Scenic Byways
← MD 544	→ MD 546

Maryland Route 545 (MD 545) is a state highway in the U.S. state of Maryland. Known for most of its length as Blue Ball Road, the state highway runs 5.92 miles (9.53 km) from MD 213 in Elkton north to Kirk Road and Warburton Road at Pleasant Hill in central Cecil County. MD 545 was constructed to Little Elk Creek near Childs in the early 1930s and extended to Pleasant Hill in the late 1940s.

== Route description ==
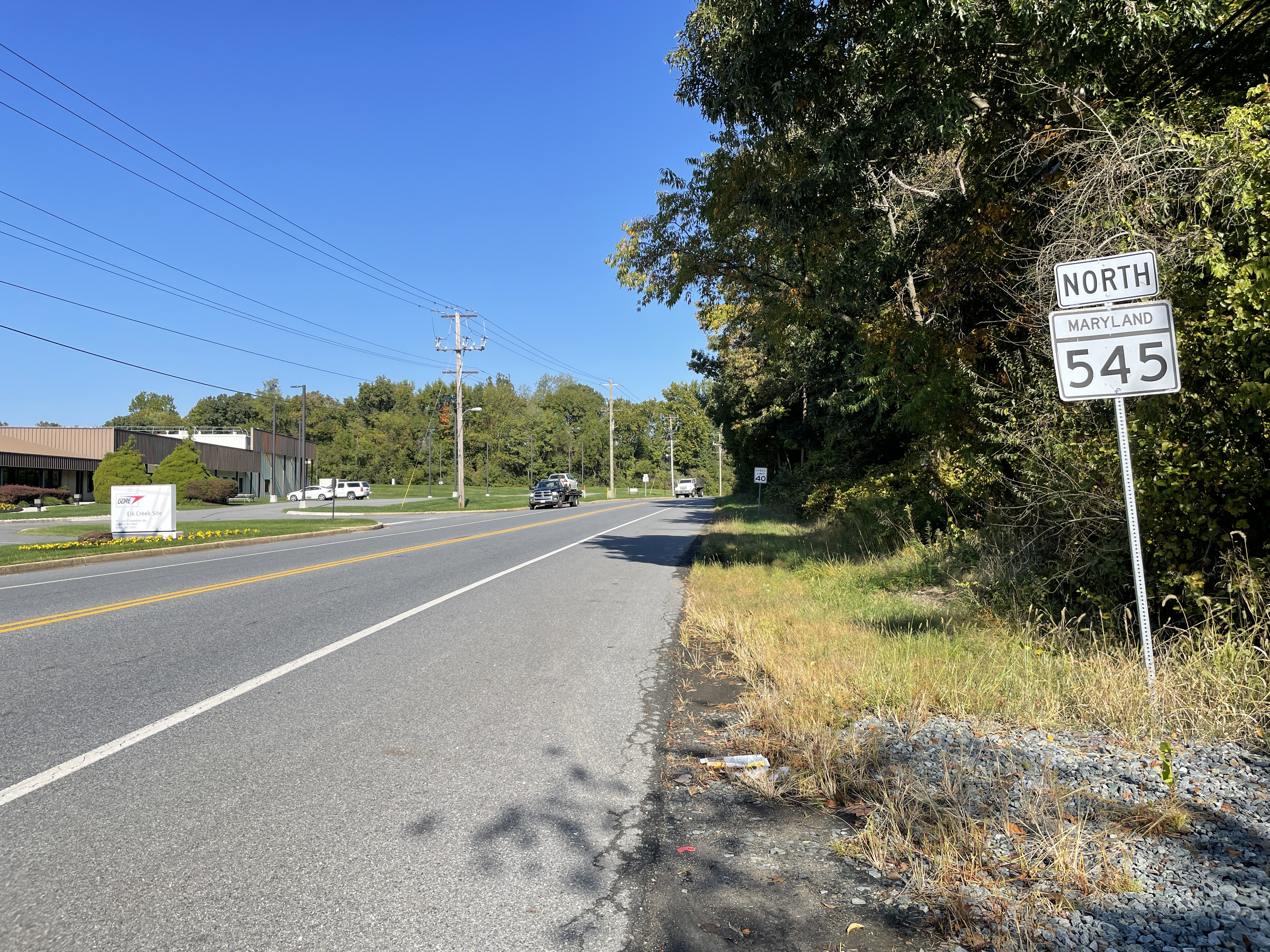
MD 545 northbound past MD 279 in Elkton

MD 545 begins at MD 213 (Bridge Street) on the west side of Elkton. The state highway heads west as two-lane undivided Elkton Boulevard, which becomes Blue Ball Road when the highway curves north at Bratton Road. MD 545 intersects MD 279 (Elkton Road) and crosses Dogwood Run before leaving the town of Elkton. The highway intersects Dogwood Road, crosses Gravelly Run, then passes under Interstate 95 with no access and immediately crosses Little Elk Creek. MD 545 parallels the creek to the road's narrow, curved passage under CSX's Philadelphia Subdivision rail line as it enters the village of Childs. The highway intersects Leeds Road in the hamlet of Leeds before reaching its northern terminus at an intersection with Kirk Road and Warburton Road in the hamlet of Pleasant Hill. Blue Ball Road continues northwest as a county highway toward Blue Ball Village.

== History ==
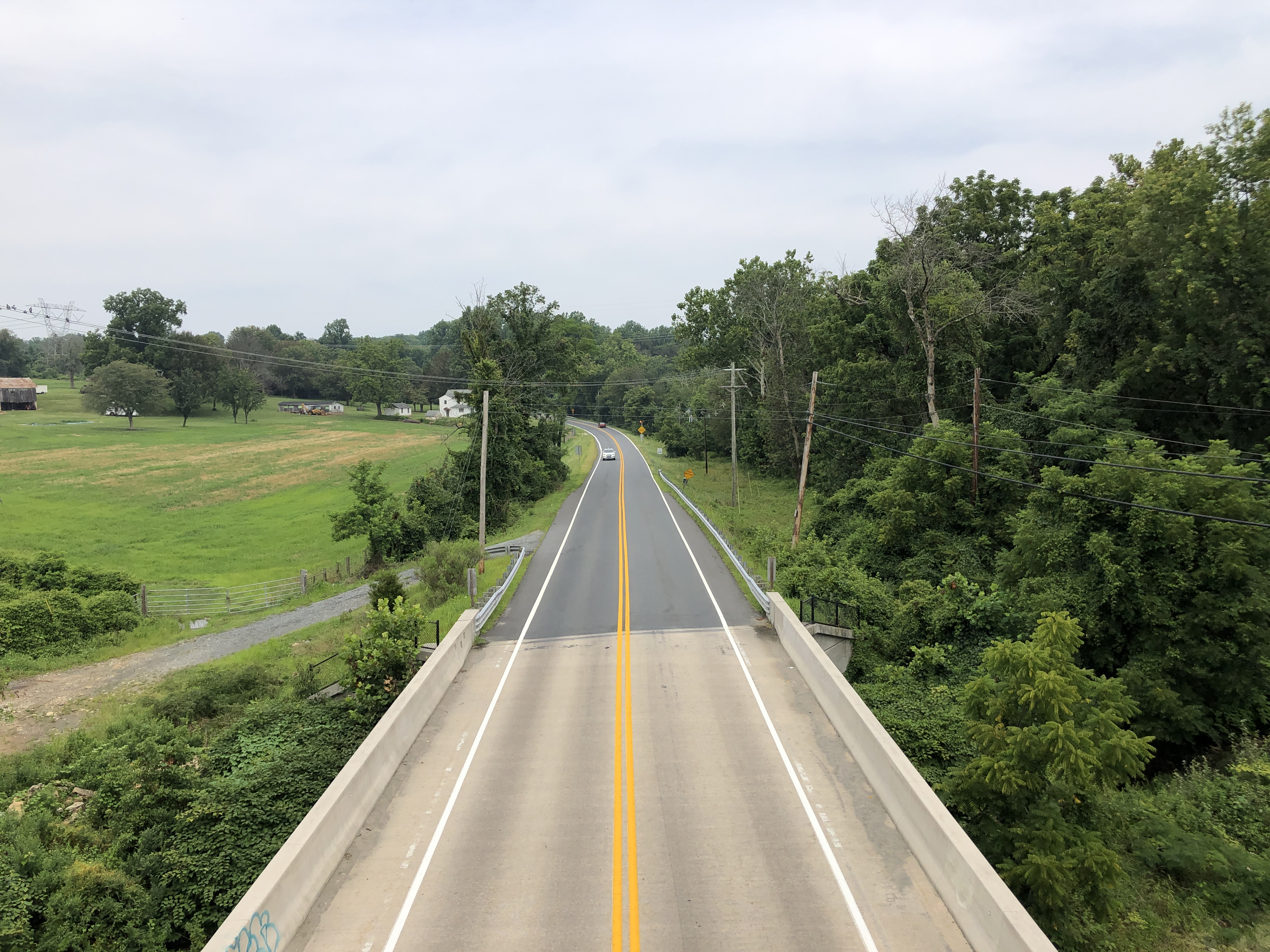
View north along MD 545 from I-95 in Childs

MD 545 was paved as a concrete road from MD 280 (now MD 213) to Little Elk Creek near Childs in 1933. This work included the construction of a 27-foot-wide (8.2 m) steel pony truss bridge over Little Elk Creek that was completed in 1932. MD 545 was extended to Pleasant Hill after the state reconstructed Blue Ball Road from there to Childs as a gravel road between 1947 and 1949 and resurfaced soon after with bituminous concrete. The highway was resurfaced with bituminous concrete from MD 280 to Dogwood Road in 1969 and from Dogwood Road to Pleasant Hill in 1972. In January 2010, the Maryland State Highway Administration put the 1932 pony truss bridge MD 545 used to cross Little Elk Creek up for sale to any buyer willing to preserve the bridge at a new location. No interested party was found, so the old bridge was demolished in June and July 2011. The new 32-foot-wide (9.8 m) concrete bridge opened in November 2011.

== Junction list ==
The entire route is in Cecil County.

Location	mi	km	Destinations	Notes
Elkton	0.00	0.00	MD 213 (Bridge Street) – Chesapeake City, Fair Hill	Southern terminus
Elkton	0.71	1.14	MD 279 (Elkton Road) to US 40 – Newark	
Pleasant Hill	5.92	9.53	Blue Ball Road north / Kirk Road east / Warburton Road west	Northern terminus
1.000 mi = 1.609 km; 1.000 km = 0.621 mi
