= John Lewden House =

Historic house in Delaware, United States

- U.S. National Register of Historic Places
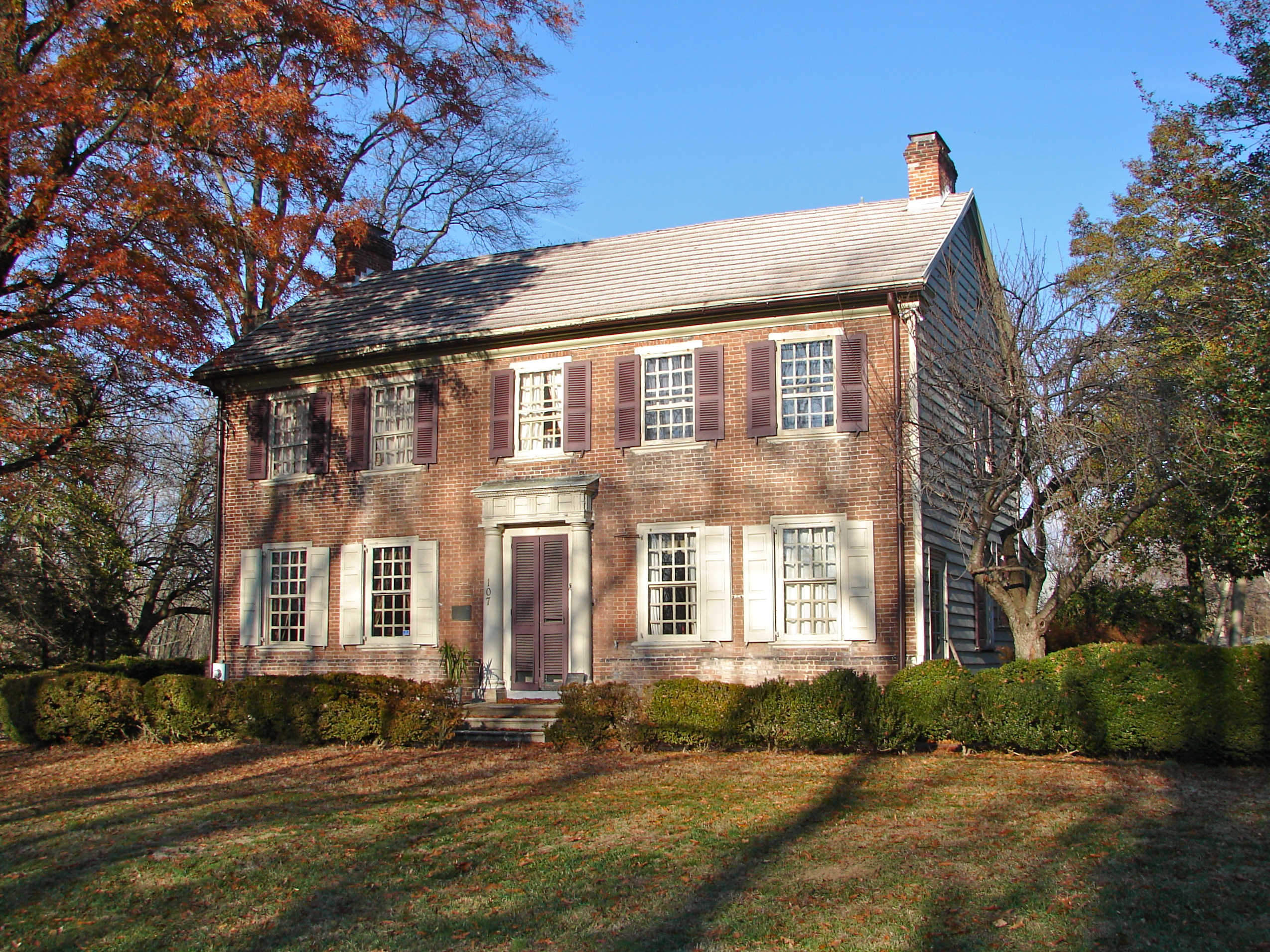
- John Lewden House, November 2010

- Location within Delaware Location within the United States
- Location: 107 E. Main St., Christiana, Delaware
- Coordinates: 39.66344°N 75.65565°W
- Area: 1.5 acres (0.61 ha)
- Built: c. 1770
- Built by: May, Robert
- Architectural style: Georgian
- NRHP reference No.: 79003104
- Added to NRHP: September 24, 1979

John Lewden House is a historic home located at Christiana, New Castle County, Delaware. It was built about 1770, and is a two-story, five-bay, single-pile, brick dwelling in the Georgian style. It has a center hall plan and the interior features original woodwork in the parlor and hall. Also on the property is a contributing two-story brick carriage shed (c. 1800).

It was listed on the National Register of Historic Places in 1979.
