= Old Baltimore Pike =

Highway in Delaware

Route information
- Maintained by DelDOT
- Length: 8.35 mi (13.44 km)
- Tourist routes: Washington–Rochambeau Revolutionary Route

Major junctions
- West end: MD 281 near Newark
- DE 896 near Glasgow; DE 72 near Glasgow; DE 273 in Christiana; DE 7 in Christiana
- East end: Dead end near Christiana

Location
- Country: United States
- State: Delaware
- Counties: New Castle

Highway system
- Delaware State Route System; List; Byways

Old Baltimore Pike is a road in the U.S. state of Delaware. The road, known as New Castle County Road 26, runs from Maryland Route 281 (MD 281) at the Maryland state line south of Newark, Delaware, and continues east to Christiana, ending near Delaware Route 1 (DE 1). The road is paralleled by Interstate 95 (I-95, Delaware Turnpike) to the north and U.S. Route 40 (US 40, Pulaski Highway) to the south. The Old Baltimore Pike was built before 1720 and connected Elkton, Maryland, to Christiana. It was a turnpike called the Elk and Christiana Turnpike between 1817 and 1838. In the past it served as a major connection between Philadelphia and Baltimore.

== Route description ==
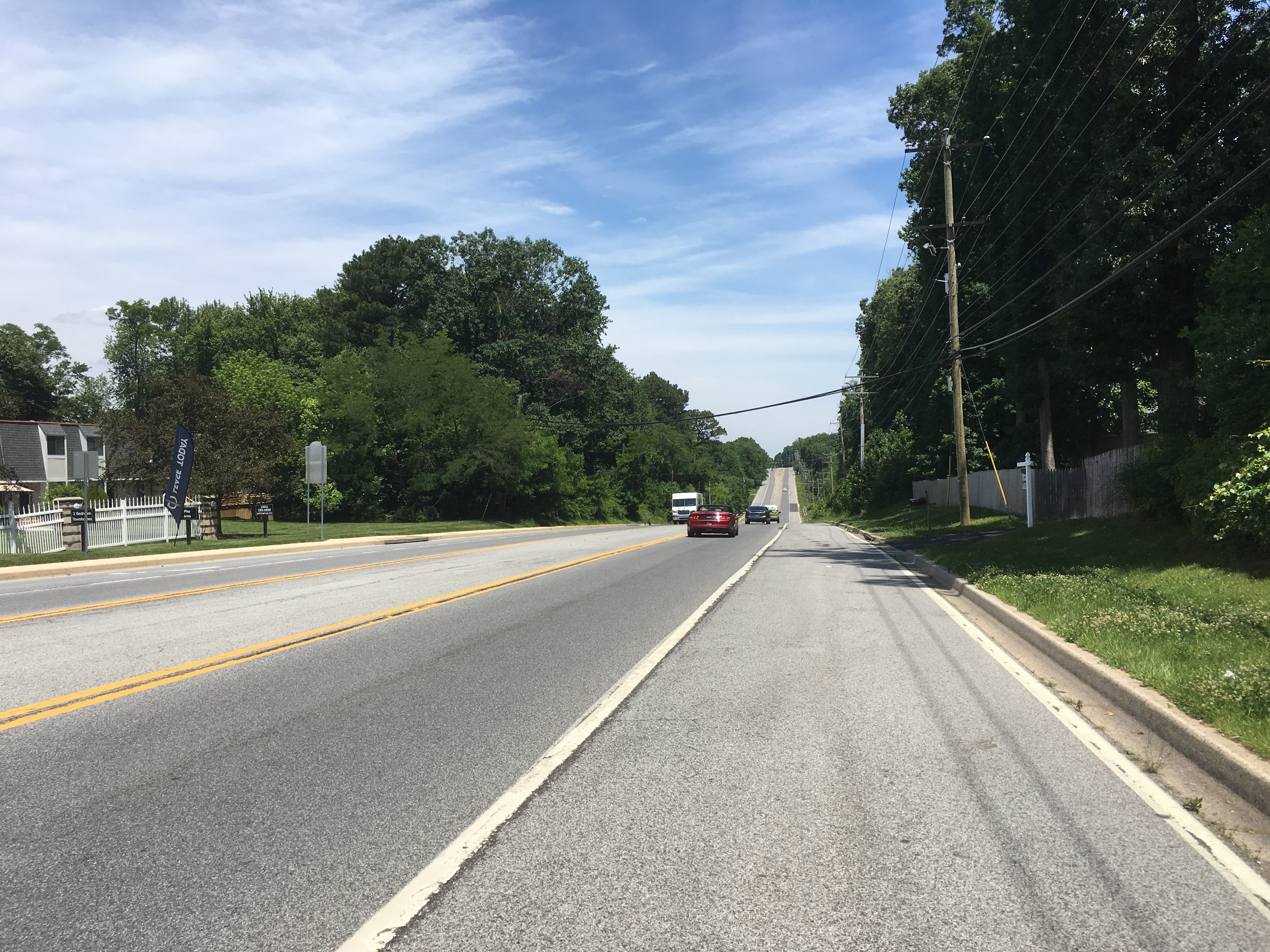
Old Baltimore Pike eastbound west of Christiana

Old Baltimore Pike begins at the Delaware–Maryland state line near the city of Newark, Delaware, where the highway continues west into Maryland as MD 281. The road heads northeast from the state line through wooded residential areas as a two-lane undivided road, intersecting Otts Chapel Road/Pleasant Valley Road before crossing Muddy Run and passing south of Iron Hill Park. Old Baltimore Pike crosses DE 896 and enters rural areas. Here, the roadway heads across the Christina River and passes Cooch's Bridge, a historic battle site of the American Revolutionary War. It then crosses Norfolk Southern's Delmarva Secondary railroad line at-grade and meets DE 72 at a junction.

After this junction, Old Baltimore Pike continues past suburban neighborhoods, gaining a center left-turn lane and intersecting Salem Church Road. Farther east, the highway reaches a junction with DE 273 in a wooded area. At this point, the road narrows to two lanes again and heads into the community of Christiana. Here, the highway intersects DE 7, where it turns north and follows that route through residential areas. DE 7 turns east to reach an interchange with DE 1 to the west of the Christiana Mall, where DE 7 continues north along with DE 1 and Old Baltimore Pike reaches a dead end.

The entire length of Old Baltimore Pike is part of the Washington–Rochambeau Revolutionary Route, a National Historic Trail. Old Baltimore Pike has an annual average daily traffic count ranging from a high of 21,327 vehicles at the Walther Road intersection to a low of 770 vehicles at the eastern terminus.

== History ==
Old Baltimore Pike eastbound near Christiana

The Old Baltimore Pike was built before 1720. The road was known as the Great Road and ran between Head of Elk (now Elkton, Maryland) and Christiana Bridge. It was later known as the Christiana-Elkton Turnpike before becoming Old Baltimore Pike. This path served as a major connection between Philadelphia and Baltimore in addition to providing access between the shipping area of Christiana Bridge and agricultural areas in northern Delaware, northern Maryland, and southeastern Pennsylvania. In 1723, Welsh Tract settlers pushed for the road to be improved. This road was part of the Washington–Rochambeau Revolutionary Route that was used by the French army during their march from Newport, Rhode Island, to Yorktown, Virginia, during the Revolutionary War, passing through the area in September 1781.

The road, also known as Old Post Road, was incorporated in 1813 as the Elk and Christiana Turnpike in order to get more money for repairs. The turnpike was completed in April 1817. As a turnpike, tolls were collected to pay for the maintenance of the road. The construction of the New Castle and Frenchtown Railroad lowered the revenues of the turnpike and it became a public road again in 1838. The road historically went through agricultural areas; however, the surroundings have become more developed over the years. Much of the Old Baltimore Pike remains two lanes.

== Major intersections ==
The entire road is in New Castle County.

Location	mi	km	Destinations	Notes
Newark	0.00	0.00	MD 281 west (Red Hill Road) – Elkton	Maryland state line; western terminus
Glasgow	2.49	4.01	DE 896 (South College Avenue) to I-95 – Newark, Glasgow	
Glasgow	3.32	5.34	DE 72 (South Chapel Street/Sunset Lake Road)	
Christiana	7.10	11.43	DE 273 (Christiana Road) – Newark, New Castle	
Christiana	7.41	11.93	DE 7 south (Main Street) – Bear, New Castle	West end of DE 7 overlap
Christiana	8.07	12.99	DE 7 north (Road A) to DE 1 / I-95 – Christiana, Stanton	DE 1 exit 164; east end of DE 7 overlap
Christiana	8.35	13.44	Dead end	Eastern terminus
1.000 mi = 1.609 km; 1.000 km = 0.621 mi: Concurrency terminus
