= Elk Mills, Maryland =

Unincorporated community in Maryland, United States

- Unincorporated community
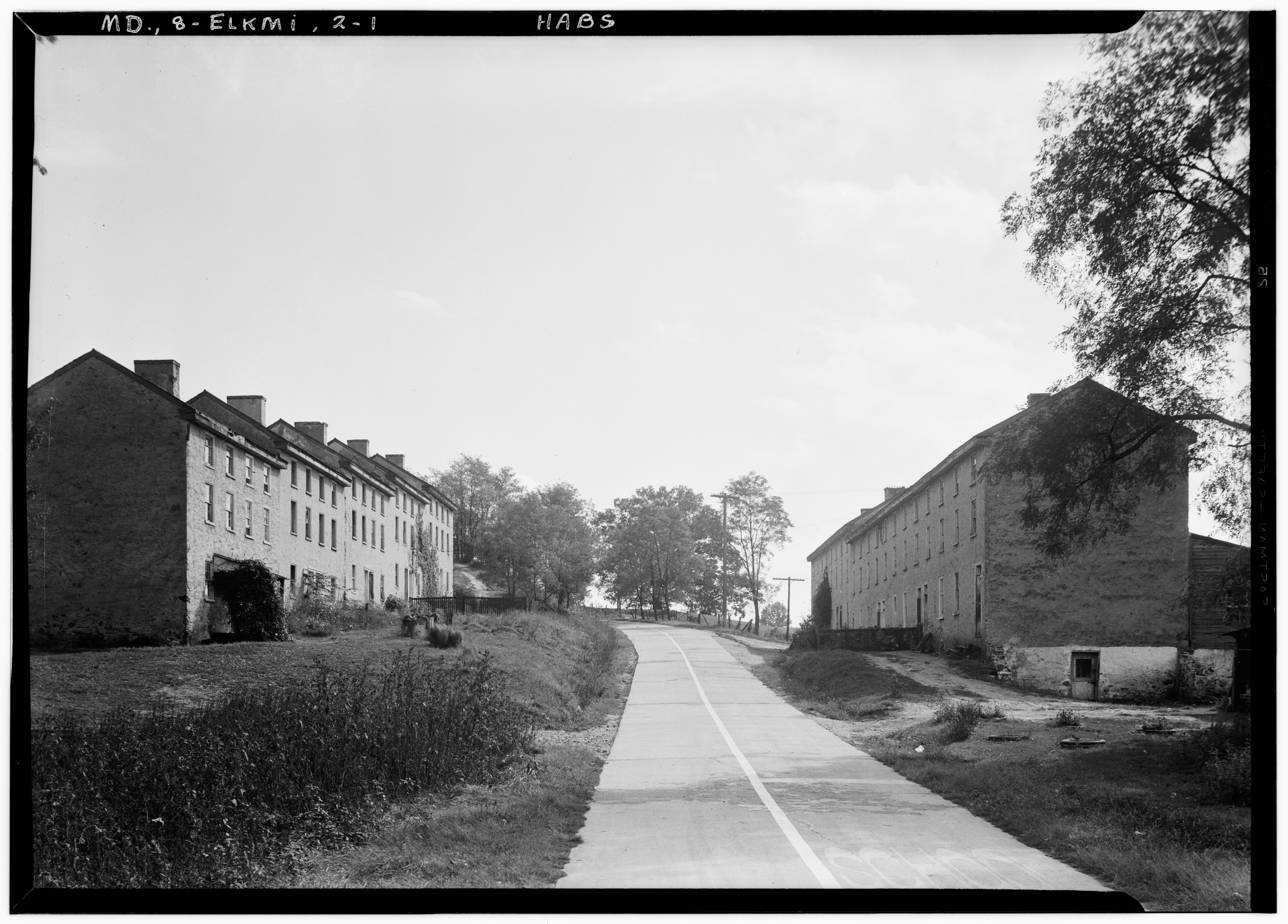
- Elk Mills buildings in 1936

- Location within the State of Maryland Elk Mills (the United States)
- Coordinates: 39°39′31″N 75°49′34″W
- Country: United States
- State: Maryland
- County: Cecil
- Elevation: 144 ft (44 m)
- Time zone: UTC-5 (Eastern (EST))
  - Summer (DST): UTC-4 (EDT)
- ZIP code: 21920
- Area codes: 410, 443, and 667
- GNIS feature ID: 590148

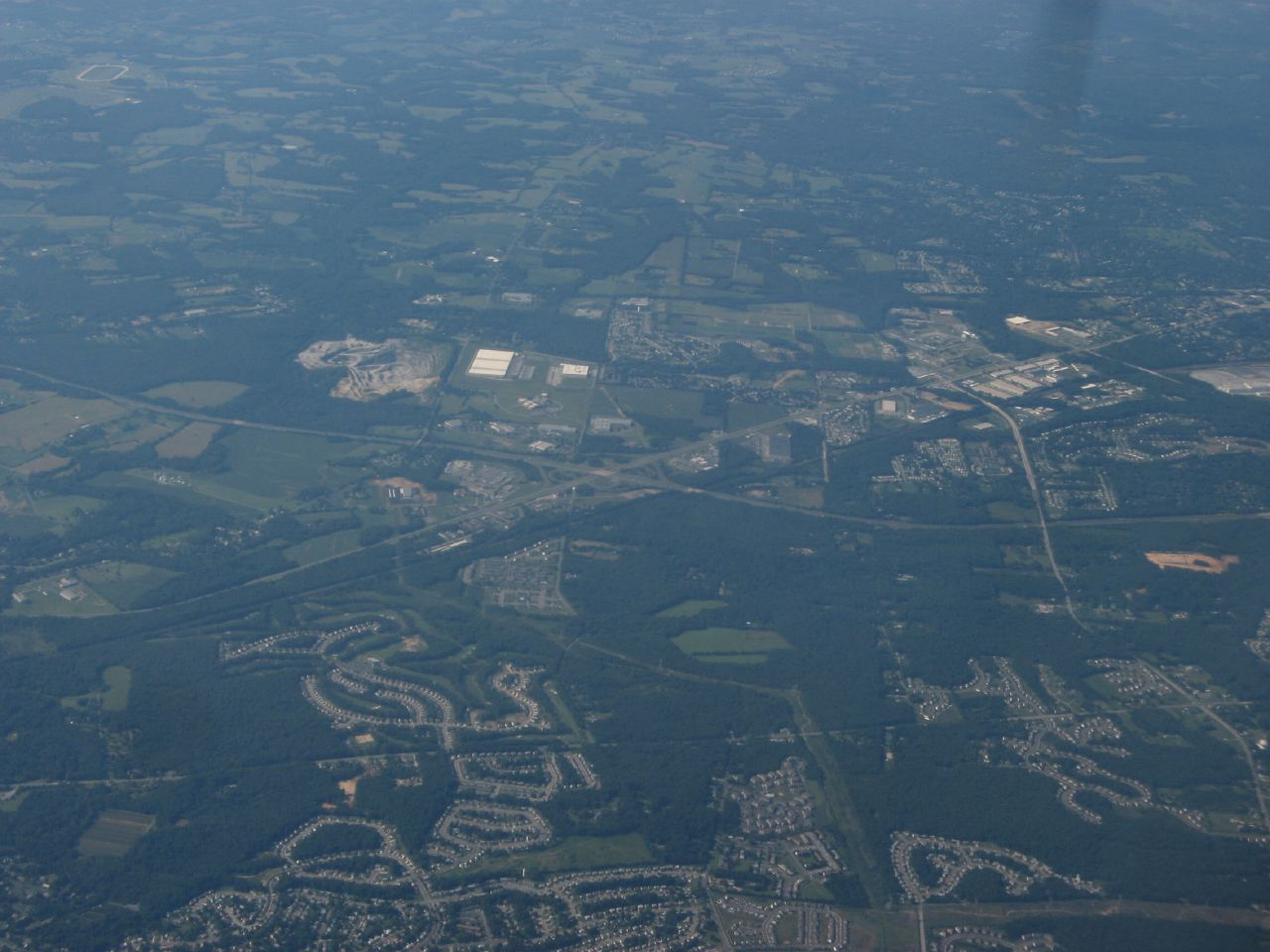
An aerial view of the Elk Mills area

Elk Mills is an unincorporated community in Cecil County, Maryland, United States.

Maryland Route 277 is the most major route in the area. CSX's Philadelphia Subdivision railroad line of north of Elkton, Maryland crosses Maryland Route 277. The unincorporated area's post office for the 21920 postal code is also located on Maryland Route 277.
