= Christiana, Delaware =

- Unincorporated community
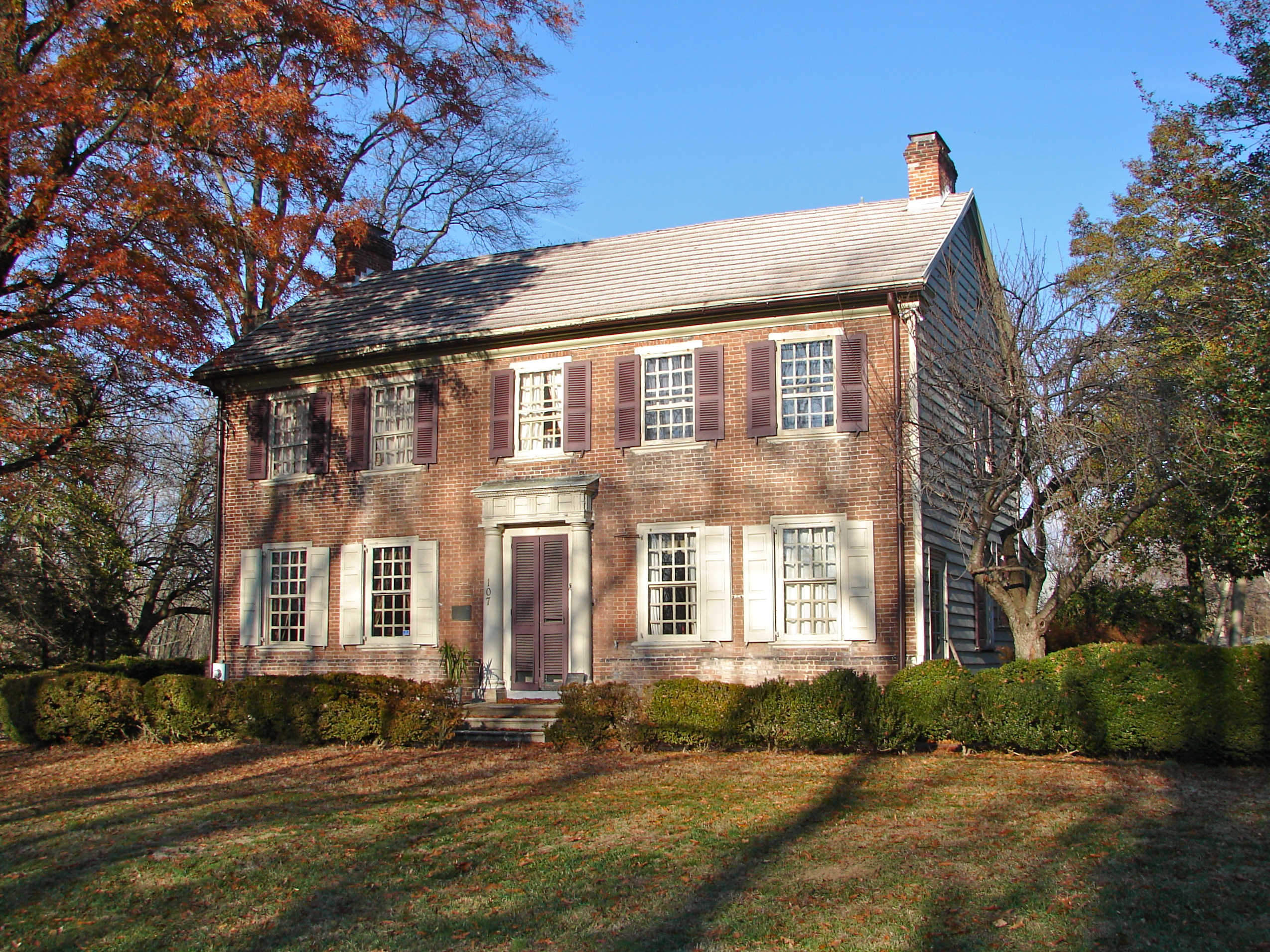
- John Lewden House

- Location within the state of Delaware Christiana, Delaware (the United States)
- Coordinates: 39°39′54″N 75°39′36″W
- Country: United States
- State: Delaware
- County: New Castle
- Elevation: 30 ft (9.1 m)
- Time zone: UTC-5 (Eastern (EST))
  - Summer (DST): UTC-4 (EDT)
- ZIP code: 19702
- Area code: 302
- GNIS feature ID: 213798

Christiana is an unincorporated community in New Castle County, Delaware, United States, located on the Christina River, 12 miles southwest of Wilmington. It is home to the Christiana Hospital and the Christiana Mall and is the location of the northern terminus of Delaware Route 1 at an interchange with Interstate 95. Despite sharing a name with Christiana Hundred, the community of Christiana is located in White Clay Creek Hundred.

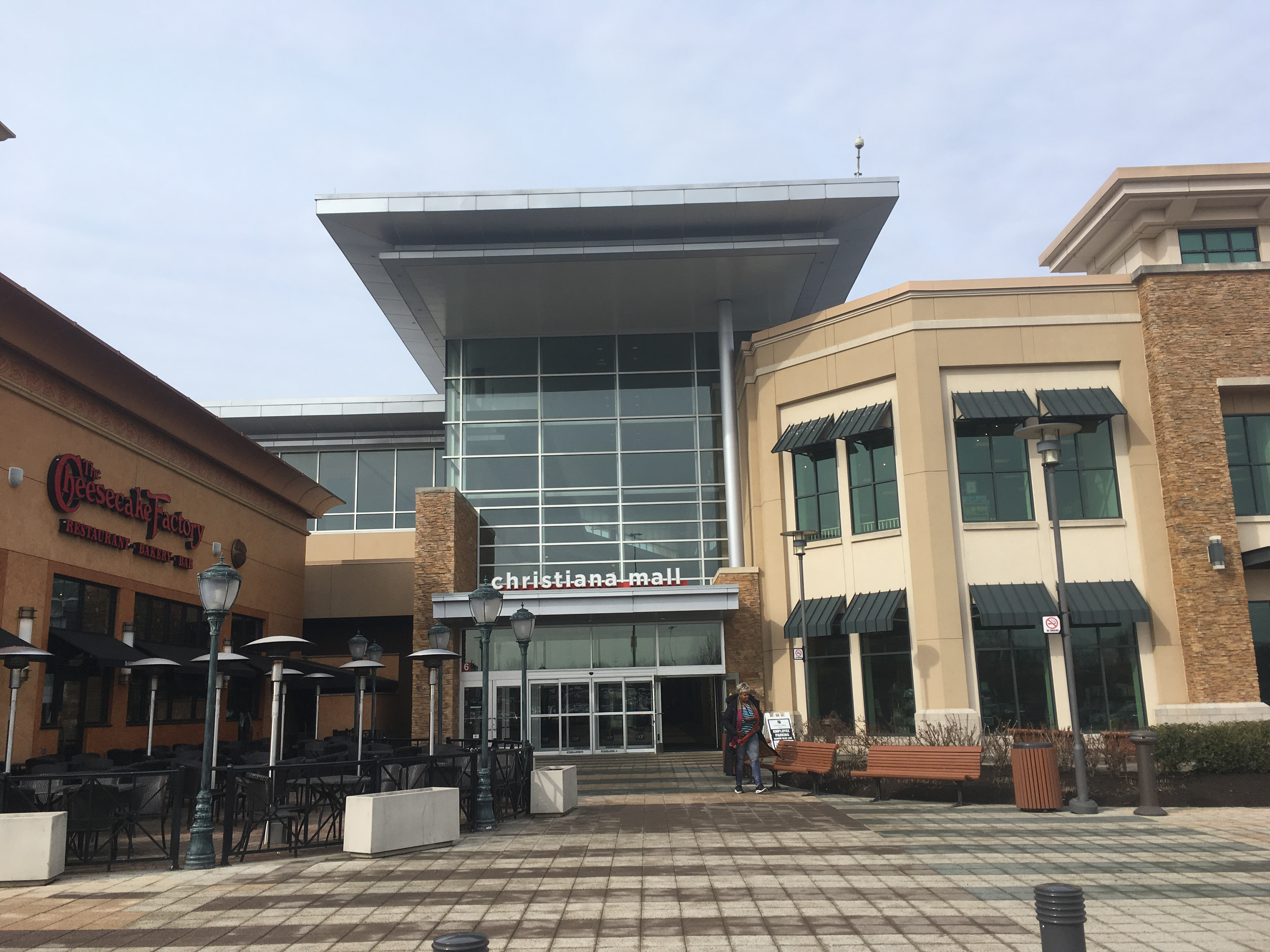
Christiana Mall

== History ==
It is named after the Christina River, which is in turn named after Christina, Queen of Sweden who oversaw the founding of New Sweden in 1638.

The Christiana Historic District, Charles Allen House, John Lewden House, Old Fort Church, Public School No. 111-C, and James Stewart Jr. House and George Hillis Sr. House are listed on the National Register of Historic Places.

Christiana's population was 400 in 1890, 381 in 1900, 411 in 1925, and 500 in 1960.

== Notable people ==
- Rebecca Lee (Davis) Crumpler (1831–1895), first African-American woman in the United States to become a medical doctor
- Annie Ryder Gracey (1836–1908), writer, missionary
- Joe Dombrowski (b. 1991), professional road racing cyclist
- Christiana Barkley (b. 1989), named by her father Charles Barkley after the Christiana Mall
