= Elkton, Maryland =

City in Maryland, United States

- Town
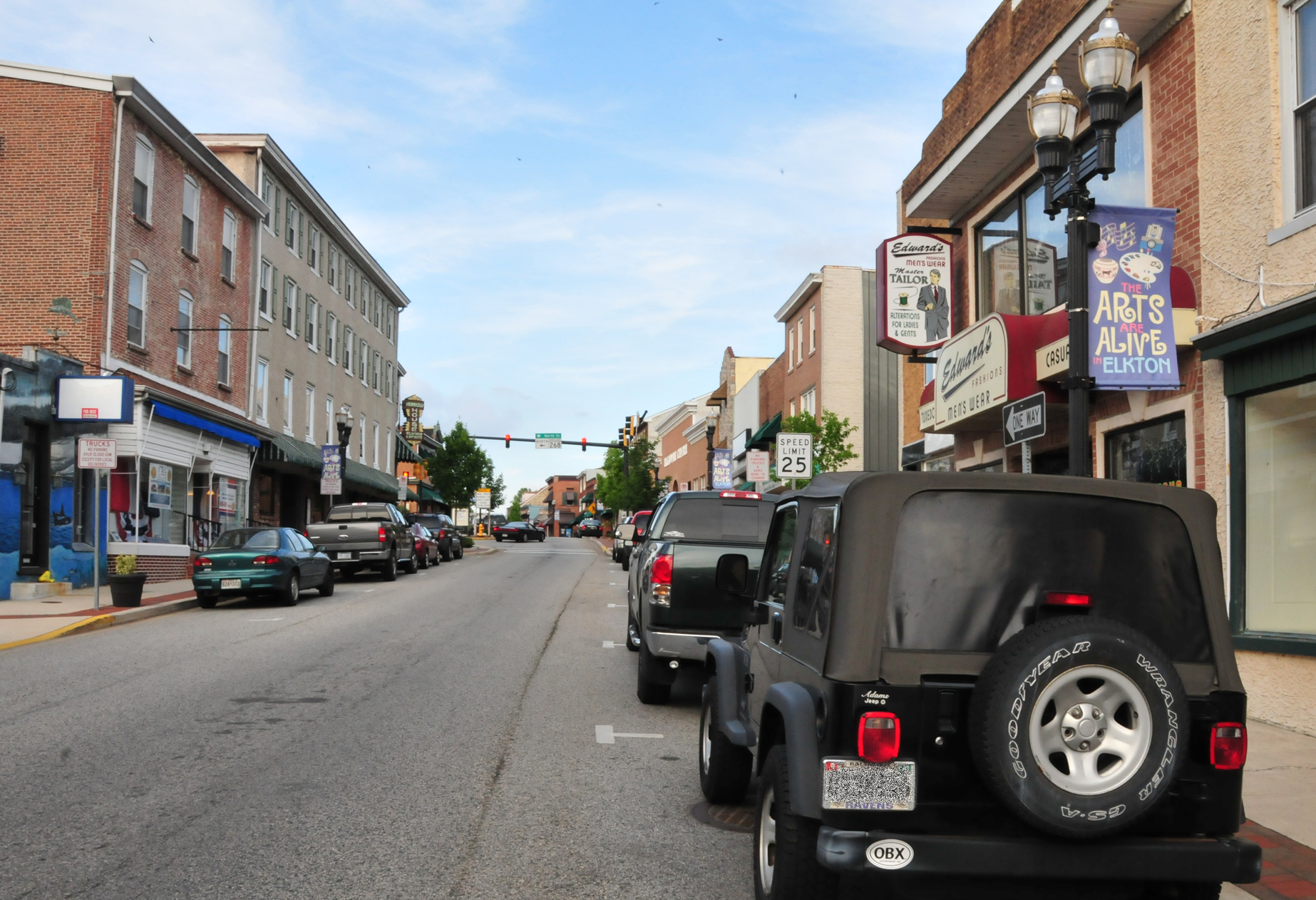
- View of Main Street

- Flag Seal
- Nickname: "The Elopement capital of the East Coast"
- Location in Cecil County and the State of Maryland

- Location in the United States
- Coordinates: 39°36′28″N 75°49′47″W
- Country: United States
- State: Maryland
- County: Cecil
- Incorporated: 1787

Government
  - Mayor: Robert J. Alt

Area
  - Total: 9.16 sq mi (23.73 km^{2})
  - Land: 8.89 sq mi (23.02 km^{2})
  - Water: 0.27 sq mi (0.71 km^{2})
- Elevation: 30 ft (9 m)

Population (2020)
  - Total: 15,807
  - Density: 1,778.2/sq mi (686.56/km^{2})
- Time zone: UTC-05:00 (EST)
  - Summer (DST): UTC-04:00 (EDT)
- ZIP codes: 21921-21922
- Area codes: 410, 443, and 667
- FIPS code: 24-25800
- GNIS feature ID: 0590150
- Website: elkton.org

Elkton is a town in and the county seat of Cecil County, Maryland, United States. The population was 15,807 at the 2020 census, up from 15,443 in 2010. It was formerly called Head of Elk because it sits at the head of navigation on the Elk River, one of the five tributary rivers that flow into the north of the Chesapeake Bay, east of the Susquehanna River and North East River, and north of the Bohemia River, and Sassafras River.

Elkton was once known as the Gretna Green of the East of the US because of its popularity as a place for eloping couples to marry.

== History ==
The town was founded by Swedish mariners and fishermen from Fort Casimir who settled the area in 1694. They called their settlement Head of Elk, as it was the head of navigation of the Elk River.

The town saw several actions during the American Revolutionary War. On August 25, 1777, Sir William Howe's Anglo-German army (13,000 British soldiers and 5,000 Germans) landed on the Elk River and marched 11 miles north to Head of Elk. Howe soon advanced to the short and victorious campaign of the Brandywine, and thence to the capture of Philadelphia. On March 8, 1781, the Marquis de Lafayette embarked his troops there to attempt a capture of Benedict Arnold. Returning on April 9, he began his overland march to Virginia. George Washington and Rochambeau with their combined forces stopped in Elkton on September 6–7, 1781, on their way to Yorktown.

In 1787, the town was incorporated as Elkton. By 1880, the population was 1,752.

The landmark historic home, Holly Hall, was built by James Sewall in the 1810s and quickly became a regional seat for important dignitaries and local politics.

When northern states began to pass more restrictive marriage laws in the early 20th century, Maryland did not. As a result, a number of Maryland towns near borders with other states became known as places to get married quickly and without many restrictions, or "Gretna Greens". Elkton, being the northeasternmost county seat in Maryland (and thus closer to Philadelphia, New York, and New England), was particularly popular. It was a notorious Gretna Green for years; in its heyday, in the 1920s and 1930s, it was "the elopement capital of the East Coast" and thousands of marriages were performed there each year. While some of the marriages obtained in Elkton were of celebrities or celebrities-to-be (Cornel Wilde, Joan Fontaine, Debbie Reynolds, Martha Raye, John and Martha Mitchell, Willie Mays, and Pat Robertson all got married in Elkton).

A 48-hour waiting period was imposed in 1938, but Elkton continued to be a place to marry, and especially elope; it simply took longer. The year before the Maryland Legislature enacted a 48-hour waiting period, the marriage bureau in the town of about 3,300 people issued 16,054 licenses. That number slumped to 4,532 in 1939. Still, the marrying ministers found all sorts of loopholes that allowed the business to continue for decades. The waiting period could be lifted, for instance, if the "mother was expecting", or if a young man was preparing to go off to war. In 1942, Elkton had about 14,000 marriages.

In time, Las Vegas became the new "American Gretna Green", although hundreds of people still came to Elkton. But an era faded in the northeastern Maryland county seat when the last commercial wedding chapel closed in 2017.

On December 8, 1963, Pan Am Flight 214 was struck by lightning and crashed near Elkton, taking 81 lives. The crash was listed in the 2005 Guinness World Records as the "Worst Lightning Strike Death Toll." (Note: In 1971, LANSA Flight 508 was also brought down by a lightning strike. Flight 508's crash would have more total casualties (91 fatalities), as up to fourteen passengers survived the crash but died afterwards in the Peruvian jungle while waiting for help.) A small memorial marks the site of the crash, the worst loss of life accident in Maryland. The Boeing 707 had gone down in a cornfield on the eastern edge of the town, and in 1994 a granite memorial was placed at Delancy Road and Wheelhouse Drive. Today the area is a housing development.

== Geography ==
According to the United States Census Bureau, the town has a total area of 8.61 square miles (22.30 km^{2}), of which 8.35 square miles (21.63 km^{2}) is land and 0.26 square miles (0.67 km^{2}) is water.

=== Climate ===
The climate in this area is characterized by hot, humid summers and generally mild to cool winters. According to the Köppen Climate Classification system, Elkton has a humid subtropical climate, abbreviated "Cfa" on climate maps.

Climate data for Elkton, Maryland
Month	Jan	Feb	Mar	Apr	May	Jun	Jul	Aug	Sep	Oct	Nov	Dec	Year
Record high °F (°C)	75 (24)	79 (26)	89 (32)	94 (34)	97 (36)	100 (38)	105 (41)	103 (39)	100 (38)	90 (32)	85 (29)	75 (24)	105 (41)
Mean daily maximum °F (°C)	41 (5)	45 (7)	55 (13)	66 (19)	76 (24)	84 (29)	88 (31)	85 (29)	79 (26)	68 (20)	57 (14)	46 (8)	66 (19)
Mean daily minimum °F (°C)	23 (−5)	25 (−4)	32 (0)	41 (5)	51 (11)	60 (16)	65 (18)	64 (18)	57 (14)	44 (7)	34 (1)	28 (−2)	44 (7)
Record low °F (°C)	−10 (−23)	−8 (−22)	4 (−16)	14 (−10)	28 (−2)	38 (3)	41 (5)	42 (6)	33 (1)	23 (−5)	12 (−11)	−6 (−21)	−10 (−23)
Average precipitation inches (mm)	3.47 (88)	2.73 (69)	4.04 (103)	3.53 (90)	4.41 (112)	4.06 (103)	4.49 (114)	4.01 (102)	4.28 (109)	3.38 (86)	3.39 (86)	3.56 (90)	45.35 (1,152)
Average snowfall inches (cm)	5.7 (14)	4.4 (11)	1.2 (3.0)	0 (0)	0 (0)	0 (0)	0 (0)	0 (0)	0 (0)	0 (0)	0.4 (1.0)	2.3 (5.8)	14 (34.8)

== Demographics ==
Historical population
Census	Pop.	Note	%±
1850	1,099		—
1870	1,797		—
1880	1,752		−2.5%
1890	2,318		32.3%
1900	2,542		9.7%
1910	2,487		−2.2%
1920	2,650		6.6%
1930	3,331		25.7%
1940	3,518		5.6%
1950	5,245		49.1%
1960	5,989		14.2%
1970	5,362		−10.5%
1980	6,468		20.6%
1990	9,073		40.3%
2000	11,893		31.1%
2010	15,443		29.8%
2020	15,807		2.4%
U.S. Decennial Census

=== 2020 census ===
As of the 2020 census, Elkton had a population of 15,807. The median age was 35.5 years. 24.7% of residents were under the age of 18 and 12.6% of residents were 65 years of age or older. For every 100 females there were 93.7 males, and for every 100 females age 18 and over there were 89.4 males age 18 and over.

99.1% of residents lived in urban areas, while 0.9% lived in rural areas.

There were 5,945 households in Elkton, of which 35.2% had children under the age of 18 living in them. Of all households, 36.3% were married-couple households, 19.8% were households with a male householder and no spouse or partner present, and 34.6% were households with a female householder and no spouse or partner present. About 29.9% of all households were made up of individuals and 10.6% had someone living alone who was 65 years of age or older.

There were 6,386 housing units, of which 6.9% were vacant. The homeowner vacancy rate was 1.6% and the rental vacancy rate was 6.3%.

Racial composition as of the 2020 census
Race	Number	Percent
White	10,096	63.9%
Black or African American	3,208	20.3%
American Indian and Alaska Native	40	0.3%
Asian	402	2.5%
Native Hawaiian and Other Pacific Islander	4	0.0%
Some other race	580	3.7%
Two or more races	1,477	9.3%
Hispanic or Latino (of any race)	1,349	8.5%

=== 2010 census ===
As of the census of 2010, there were 15,443 people, 5,580 households, and 3,673 families living in the town. The population density was 1,849.5 inhabitants per square mile (714.1/km^{2}). There were 5,944 housing units at an average density of 711.9 per square mile (274.9/km^{2}). The racial makeup of the town was 76.0% White, 15.1% African American, 0.3% Native American, 2.6% Asian, 0.1% Pacific Islander, 2.0% from other races, and 3.8% from two or more races. Hispanic or Latino of any race were 5.9% of the population.

There were 5,580 households, of which 40.9% had children under the age of 18 living with them, 40.0% were married couples living together, 19.6% had a female householder with no husband present, 6.2% had a male householder with no wife present, and 34.2% were non-families. 27.3% of all households were made up of individuals, and 9.1% had someone living alone who was 65 years of age or older. The average household size was 2.65 and the average family size was 3.21.

The median age in the town was 32.8 years. 28% of residents were under the age of 18; 9.6% were between the ages of 18 and 24; 31% were from 25 to 44; 22.2% were from 45 to 64; and 9.3% were 65 years of age or older. The gender makeup of the town was 48.2% male and 51.8% female.

=== 2000 census ===
As of the census of 2000, there were 11,893 people, 4,446 households, and 2,898 families living in the town. The population density was 1,480.5 inhabitants per square mile (571.6/km^{2}). There were 4,743 housing units at an average density of 590.4 per square mile (228.0/km^{2}). The racial makeup of the town was 85.85% White, 9.64% African American, 0.32% Native American, 1.17% Asian, 0.04% Pacific Islander, 0.78% from other races, and 2.20% from two or more races. Hispanic or Latino of any race were 2.97% of the population.

There were 4,446 households, out of which 37.2% had children under the age of 18 living with them, 41.7% were married couples living together, 18.3% had a female householder with no husband present, and 34.8% were non-families. 27.4% of all households were made up of individuals, and 8.3% had someone living alone who was 65 years of age or older. The average household size was 2.55 and the average family size was 3.13.

In the town, the population was spread out, with 29.4% under the age of 18, 9.8% from 18 to 24, 33.5% from 25 to 44, 17.0% from 45 to 64, and 10.3% who were 65 years of age or older. The median age was 31 years. For every 100 females, there were 91.9 males. For every 100 females age 18 and over, there were 87.0 males.

The median income for a household in the town was $38,171, and the median income for a family was $44,348. Males had a median income of $36,495 versus $25,543 for females. The per capita income for the town was $17,789. About 9.4% of families and 11.8% of the population were below the poverty line, including 16.0% of those under age 18 and 10.5% of those age 65 or over.

== Education ==
Students in Elkton are served by Cecil County Public Schools. Elkton High School is a public school located in the town. Cecil College operates the Elkton Station campus in Elkton. Three elementary, one middle school, and one high school serves Elkton and the surrounding areas.

== Government ==
The town is managed with a Mayor–council government, in which it has an elected Mayor who serves 4-year terms and four elected Town Commissioners who also serve 4-year terms. There have been a total of 41 Mayors in Elkton ever since the town was incorporated. The current mayor of Elkton is Robert J. Alt, who has been Mayor since 2014. Alt previously served as Mayor from 1998 until 2002.

== Sports and recreation ==
There are several parks located in the town limits, such as Marina Park, which is on Bridge Street (Maryland Route 213). Marina Park contains one tennis court and one small basketball court. Another park is, there is Meadow Park (officially called the John P. Stanley Memorial Park) located on Delaware Avenue (Maryland Route 7) which is the largest park in Elkton. Meadow Park is known for hosting kids football and soccer. There is also Eder Park, located near Meadow Park. Eder Park is located on Howard Street and is accessible to Meadow Park via a foot bridge. Eder Park is known for hosting little league baseball events in the spring and summer. Across the street from the former mentioned Meadow Park, there is a dog park.

For fishing, there are many options. For instance, Howard's Pond on Red Hill Road (Maryland State Route 281), is known for hosting fishing tournaments and many people are often seen at Howard's Pond fishing for fish that have been stocked by the Maryland Department of Natural Resources.

Elkton is the site of the Fair Hill Scottish Games.

== Transportation ==
=== Roads and highways ===
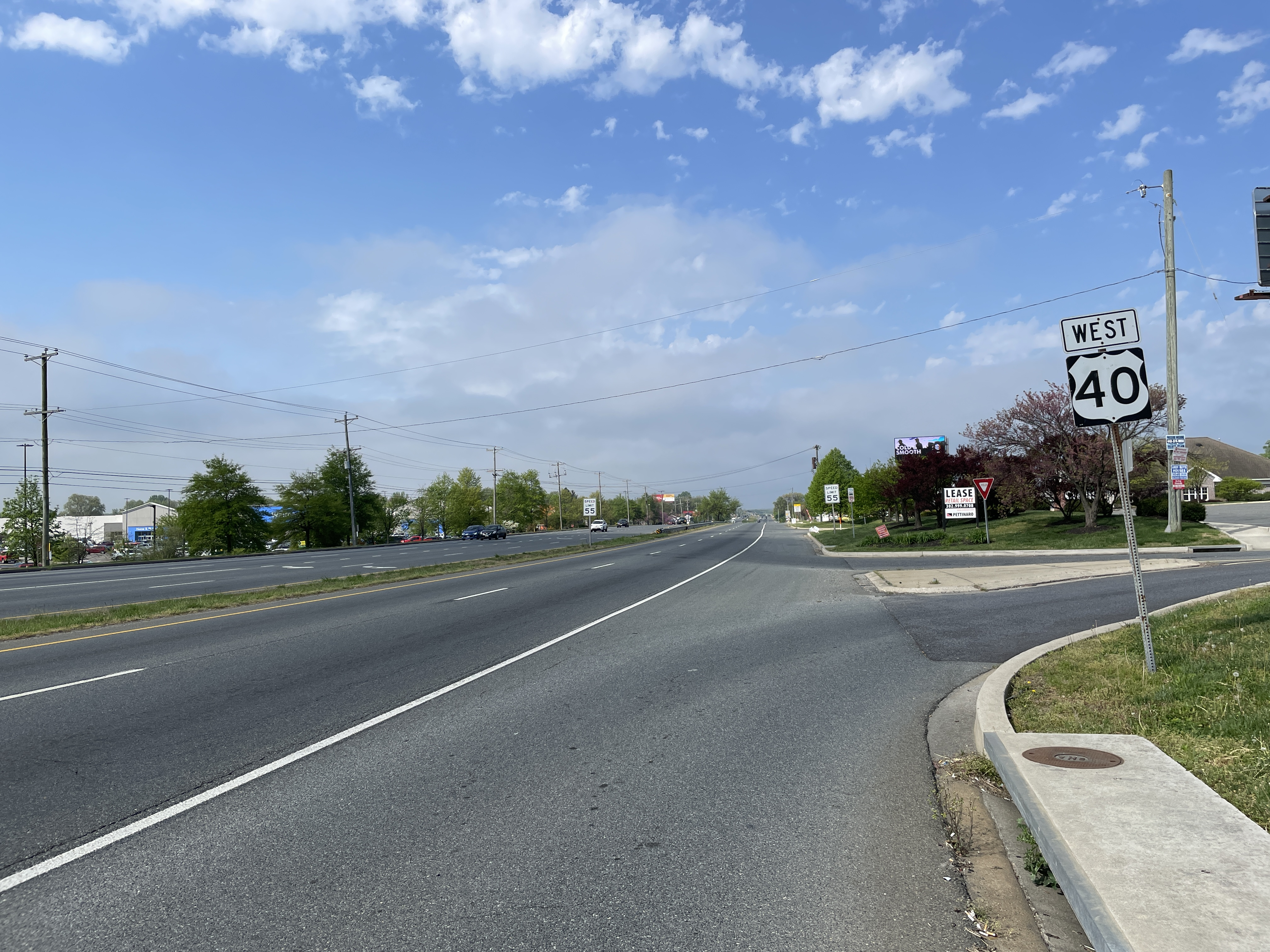
US 40 westbound past Maryland 781 in Elkton

U.S. Route 40 is the most prominent highway directly serving Elkton. It serves as the main east–west highway through Elkton, passing just south of downtown via the Pulaski Highway. To the west, US 40 heads to North East and Perryville while eastward, it joins up with U.S. Route 13 beyond Glasgow, Delaware. Maryland Route 213 passes north–south through Elkton along Bridge Street, heading south to Chesapeake City and north to Fair Hill. Maryland Route 279 begins at US 40 west of Elkton and heads northeast on Newark Avenue and Elkton Road, bypassing the center of Elkton to the north and continuing toward Newark, Delaware. Other state highways serving Elkton include Maryland Route 7, which heads east along Main Street and Delaware Avenue from the downtown area to US 40; Maryland Route 268 which follows North Street from Main Street in downtown Elkton north to MD 279; Maryland Route 281, which heads east along Red Hill Road to the Delaware border and becomes Old Baltimore Pike; Maryland Route 545, which heads northwest from Elkton along Blue Ball Road; and Maryland Route 781, which follows Delancy Road from US 40 north to MD 281.

Interstate 95 is the nearest Interstate highway, crossing the area just north of the town limits. It is accessible via an interchange with MD 279, from which point it heads south toward Baltimore and Washington, D.C., and north toward Wilmington and Philadelphia.

=== Public transportation ===
Cecil County operates Cecil Transit, a multi-route bus system. The Glasgow Connection (Route 1) runs Monday through Saturday between Elkton and Peoples Plaza in Glasgow, Delaware. The Cross-County Connection (Route 2) runs Monday through Saturday between Elkton, North East, Cecil College, Perryville (town and the Perryville station along MARC's Penn Line) and Perry Point Veteran's Medical Center. The Elkton Newark Connection (Route 4) runs Monday through Friday and connects Elkton to Glasgow and Newark, Delaware, where it connects with the Newark Rail Station that serves Amtrak and SEPTA Regional Rail's Wilmington/Newark Line trains along with DART First State buses at the Newark Transit Hub. Service between Elkton and Newark was previously provided by DART First State Route 65. The county also operates Demand Response, which is a countywide, curb-to-curb transit service for all ages. Rides must be scheduled in advance, and are allocated on a first-come, first-served basis. Demand Response operates Monday through Friday from 8:00 am to 4:00 pm.

== Notable people ==
- Robert Alexander (1740–1805), Loyalist political leader during the American Revolution
- James Allison Jr. (1772–1854), U.S. Representative from Pennsylvania
- John Andrews (1746–1813), provost of the University of Pennsylvania and founder of York College of Pennsylvania
- John Creswell (1828–1891), United States postmaster general
- James G. Crouse (1945–2022), member of the Maryland House of Delegates and longest-serving mayor of Elkton
- Austin Lane Crothers (1860–1912), 46th Governor of Maryland
- Martha Finley (1828–1909), author of children's books
- James Black Groome (1838–1893), 36th Governor of Maryland and U.S. Senator from Maryland
- Dwayne Henry (born 1962), Major League Baseball relief pitcher
- Bobby Jones (born 1949), Major League Baseball outfielder
- Samuel J. Keys (1847–1924), mayor of Elkton and member of the Maryland House of Delegates
- Henry McIntire (1835–1863), Union Army lieutenant colonel who died of wounds sustained at the Battle of Glendale
- Bernard Purdie (born 1939), drummer and session musician
- Jeremy Rose (born 1979), jockey and 2005 ESPY Award winner
- Michael Rudolph (1758–1795), acting Adjutant General and acting Inspector General of the U.S. Army in 1793
- Frank R. Scott (1856–1917), member of the Maryland House of Delegates
- Julian C. Smith (1885–1975), United States Marine Corps general
- Larry Webster (born 1969), National Football League defensive tackle
- Larry Webster III (born 1990), National Football League defensive end
- Vic Willis (1876–1947), Major League Baseball pitcher and member of the National Baseball Hall of Fame
- Harry Woolman (1909–1996), stuntman and special effects designer

== See also ==
- Elk Landing
- Washington–Rochambeau Revolutionary Route
