= Crothers =

Crothers may refer to:

== People ==
- Austin Lane Crothers (1860–1912), United States political figure
- Bill Crothers (born 1940), Canadian athlete
- Charles C. Crothers (1857–1897), American politician and lawyer
- Connie Crothers (born 1940), United States musician
- Daniel J. Crothers (born 1957), United States judge in North Dakota
- Deanne Crothers, Canadian politician
- Derrick Crothers (born 1942), Irish professor and political figure
- Doug Crothers (1859–1907), United States athlete
- George Crothers (1909–1982), Irish athlete
- George E. Crothers (1870–1957), United States judge and philanthropist
- Graham Crothers (born 1949), Irish athlete
- Harold Marion Crothers (born 1887), United States university professor in South Dakota
- Joel Crothers (1941–1985), United States actor
- Omar D. Crothers (died 1946), American politician and lawyer
- Omar D. Crothers Jr. (1909–1953), American politician and lawyer from Maryland
- Rachel Crothers (1878–1958), United States playwright and theater director
- Samuel Crothers (1783–1855), Presbyterian minister, writer, outspoken antislavery advocate
- Samuel McChord Crothers (1857–1927), United States clergyman and essayist
- Scatman Crothers (1910–1986), United States actor and musician
- Shane Crothers, (born 1973), Australian athlete
- Thomas Wilson Crothers (1850–1921), Canadian political figure
- Trevor Crothers (f. 1990–2000s), Australian political figure
- Whitney Crothers Dilley, American professor of comparative literature and cinema studies
- Bronson Crothers, American pediatric neurologist

== Places ==
- Crothers Woods, natural area in Toronto, Ontario, Canada

== See also ==
- Carruthers (disambiguation)
- Carothers
- Crowther
- Crowthers
