= Senator Crothers =

Senator Crothers may refer to:

- Austin Lane Crothers (1860–1912), Maryland State Senate
- Brenham C. Crothers (1905–1984), Louisiana State Senate
- Charles C. Crothers (1857–1897), Maryland State Senate
- Omar D. Crothers (died 1946), Maryland State Senate
- Omar D. Crothers Jr. (1909–1953), Maryland State Senate
