= Webster White =

American politician (1860–1923)

Member of the Maryland House of Delegates from the Cecil County district
- In office 1896–1896 Serving with Lewis T. Logan and William J. Smith
- Preceded by: Frank H. Mackie, Richard L. Thomas Jr., George S. Woolley
- Succeeded by: John H. Jenness, Wilmer D. Thompson, John S. Wirt

Personal details
- Born: 1860 Calvert, Maryland, U.S.
- Died: September 15, 1923 (aged 62–63) Calvert, Maryland, U.S.
- Resting place: Rosebank Cemetery
- Party: Republican
- Spouse: Annie Ramsey
- Children: 3
- Occupation: Politician; clerk; educator; farmer

Webster White (1860 – September 15, 1923) was an American politician from Maryland. He served as a member of the Maryland House of Delegates, representing Cecil County in 1896.

== Early life ==
Webster White was born in 1860 at Brick Meeting House in Calvert, Maryland, to Martha (née Caldwell) and Milton White. His father worked as a mail carrier, warehouse worker, and an educator at New London Academy. White was educated at West Nottingham Academy and the Friends' select school.

== Career ==
At the age of 18, White worked as a shipping clerk for one year at an iron works in Wilmington, Delaware. He was then an instructor at schools in Cecil County, Maryland, and Chester County, Pennsylvania, from 1880 to 1892.

White was a Republican. He served as a member of the Maryland House of Delegates, representing Cecil County in 1896.

In July 1892, White purchased his father's 80 acres (32 ha) farm in Cecil County.

== Personal life ==
White married Annie Ramsey, daughter of John Ramsey. They had two daughters and one son, Esther, Elizabeth and David.

White accidentally shot himself with a shotgun while hunting near his home in Calvert on September 15, 1923. He was buried in Rosebank Cemetery.
