= Carothers =

Carothers is a surname. Notable people with the surname include:

- A. J. Carothers (1931–2007), American playwright and television writer, worked with Walt Disney
- Craig Carothers, American singer-songwriter
- Dennis Carothers Stanfill, American business executive, Rhodes Scholar and philanthropist
- Don Carothers (1934–2008), American football player
- Earling Carothers Garrison (Jim) (1921–1992), District Attorney of Orleans Parish, Louisiana from 1962 to 1973
- Eleanor Carothers (1882–1957), American zoologist, geneticist, and cytologist
- Isaac Carothers, former alderman of the 29th ward on the far west side of the City of Chicago
- Robert Carothers (born 1942), served as the tenth president of the University of Rhode Island from 1991 to 2009
- Thomas Carothers, international expert on international democracy support, democratization and U.S. foreign policy
- Wallace Carothers (1896–1937), American chemist, inventor, the leader of organic chemistry at DuPont, credited with the invention of nylon

== See also ==
- Carothers equation gives the degree of polymerization, Xn, for a given fractional monomer conversion, p
- John Henry Carothers House, property in Franklin, Tennessee, listed on the National Register of Historic Places in 1989
- Carruthers (disambiguation)
- Crothers (disambiguation)
- Crowther
- Crowthers
