= William J. Smith (Maryland politician) =

American politician (1850–1906)

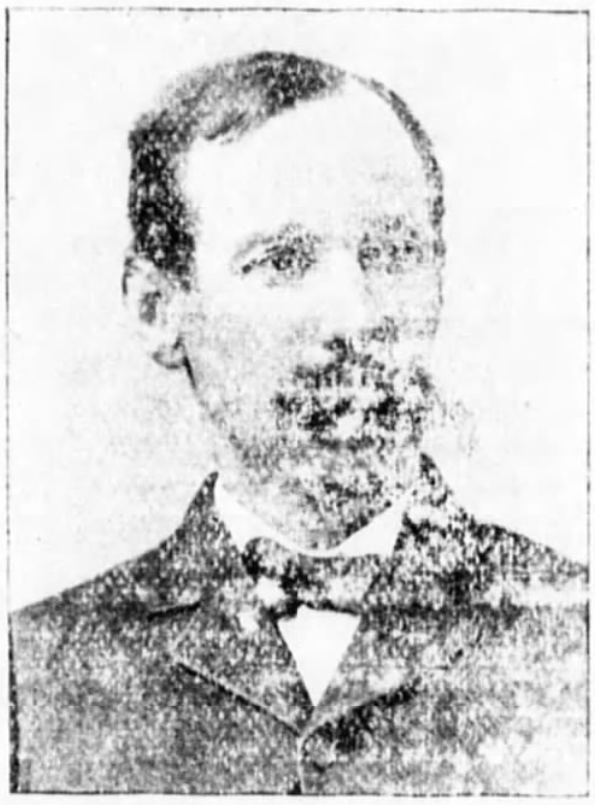
- Smith in 1906 newspaper

Member of the Maryland House of Delegates from the Cecil County district
- In office 1896–1896 Serving with Lewis T. Logan and Webster White
- Preceded by: Frank H. Mackie, Richard L. Thomas Jr., George S. Woolley
- Succeeded by: John H. Jenness, Wilmer D. Thompson, John S. Wirt

Personal details
- Born: June 26, 1850 near Chesapeake City, Maryland, U.S.
- Died: June 13, 1906 (aged 55) Elkton, Maryland, U.S.
- Resting place: Elkton Cemetery
- Party: Republican
- Spouse: Mary A. Ash (m. 1876)
- Children: 4
- Occupation: Politician

William J. Smith (June 26, 1850 – June 13, 1906) was an American politician from Maryland. He served as a member of the Maryland House of Delegates, representing Cecil County in 1896.

== Early life ==
William J. Smith was born on June 26, 1850, near Chesapeake City, Maryland, to Sarah J. (née Batton) and Samuel C. Smith. His father was a railroad worker. His maternal grandfather William Batton was a farmer and soldier in the War of 1812. Smith attended public schools. At the age of 21, he learned the trades of painter and paper hanger.

== Career ==
Smith was a Republican. In 1883, he was elected sheriff of Cecil County. In 1891, he was nominated for clerk of the circuit court, but lost. He was a member of the Maryland House of Delegates, representing Cecil County in 1896. He served as speaker pro tempore of the House of Delegates. Smith was a delegate to the 1896 Republican National Convention. In 1897, he ran for register of wills, but lost. He was also a candidate for register of wills in Cecil County.

In 1898, Smith was nominated by President William McKinley as postmaster of Elkton. He was renominated by President Theodore Roosevelt in 1902. He retired from that role in May 1906.

Smith worked in warehousing and the sale of farming implements and machinery. He was also a member of an auctioneering firm with A. T. Shockley. He continued the business after Shockley's death.

== Personal life ==
In 1876, Smith married Mary A. Ash, daughter of Miles Ash. They had one son and three daughters, Julian C., Gertrude A., Estelle and Mary B.

Smith died on June 13, 1906, at his home on East Main Street in Elkton. He was buried at Elkton Cemetery.
