= C. Frank Kirk =

American politician (1840–1916)

Member of the Maryland House of Delegates from the Cecil County district
- In office 1892–1892 Serving with Joseph T. Grove and William T. Beeks
- Preceded by: Hiester Hess, William H. Simcoe, Thomas Pearce
- Succeeded by: Frank H. Mackie, Richard L. Thomas Jr., George S. Woolley

Personal details
- Born: Charles Frank Kirk; June 21, 1840 near Blue Ball Village, Maryland, U.S.
- Died: January 3, 1916 (aged 75) Unionville, Pennsylvania, U.S.
- Resting place: Rosebank Cemetery; Calvert, Maryland, U.S.
- Party: Democratic
- Spouse(s): Sarah A. Kirk Lydia Sharpless (died 1914)
- Children: 5
- Occupation: Politician; miller

Charles Frank Kirk (June 21, 1840 – January 3, 1916) was an American politician from Maryland. He served as a member of the Maryland House of Delegates, representing Cecil County in 1892.

== Early life ==
Charles Frank Kirk was born on June 21, 1840, near Blue Ball Village, Maryland, to Sarah Ann (née Hilaman) and Elias (or Ellis) Pusey Kirk. He attended Ewingsville Academy. At the age of 16, he apprenticed the milling trade under Theodore Woollens. At the age of 19, Kirk went west for a few years. He served in the Civil War.

== Career ==
After going west, Kirk returned to Cecil County and became manager of Brickley's (later Jackson's) near Principio. He worked in the milling industry in Chester County, Pennsylvania, for some years before moving to Cecil County in 1874. For a time, he worked at Stubbs' Mill near Chrome and later in Rowlandville.

Kirk was a Democrat. He was appointed as collector of taxes in 1880. He served in that role until 1881. He served as a member of the Maryland House of Delegates, representing Cecil County in 1892.

== Personal life ==
Kirk married Sarah A. Kirk, daughter of Jacob L. Kirk of Glenroy, Pennsylvania. They had four sons and one daughter. He married Lydia F. Sharpless of West Chester around 1911. She died in 1914. He lived in West Chester for a time.

Kirk died on January 3, 1916, at the home of his son-in-law in Unionville, Pennsylvania. He was buried at Rosebank Cemetery in Calvert, Maryland.
