= Slater B. Stubbs =

American politician (died 1867)

Member of the Maryland House of Delegates from the Cecil County district
- In office 1864–1864 Serving with George W. Boulden and William J. Jones
- Preceded by: John A. J. Creswell, Andrew McIntire, Hamilton Morton
- Succeeded by: Jesse A. Kirk, James McCauley, Jethro J. McCullough, George B. Pennington
- In office 1856–1856 Serving with Samuel Miller and David Scott
- Preceded by: Richard I. Foard, Milton Y. Kidd, Richard L. Thomas
- Succeeded by: James A. Davis, Samuel Ford, Milton Y. Kidd

Personal details
- Died: July 3, 1867
- Spouse: Sarah B. Haines
- Occupation: Politician; physician

Slater B. Stubbs (died July 3, 1867) was an American politician and medical doctor from Maryland. He served as a member of the Maryland House of Delegates, representing Cecil county in 1856 and in 1864.

== Biography ==
Slater B. Stubbs He served as a member of the Maryland House of Delegates, representing Cecil county in 1856 and in 1864. He served as speaker pro tempore in 1864.

He worked as a physician in Rising Sun. He was a member of the Cecil County school board at the time of his death.

Stubbs married Sarah B. Haines, daughter of Edwin Haines. Their son was Slater B. Stubbs (died 1895). Stubbs lived in Rising Sun.

Stubbs died on July 3, 1867.
