= Milton Y. Kidd =

American politician (1826–1884)

Member of the Maryland House of Delegates from the Cecil County district
- In office 1858–1858 Serving with James A. Davis and Samuel Ford
- Preceded by: Samuel Miller, David Scott, Slater B. Stubbs
- Succeeded by: James W. Maxwell, William R. Miller, Alexander Wilson
- In office 1854–1854 Serving with Richard I. Foard and Richard L. Thomas
- Preceded by: John W. Morgan, George Ricketts, Cornelius Smith
- Succeeded by: Samuel Miller, David Scott, Slater B. Stubbs
- In office 1849–1849 Serving with Noble Biddle, Richard I. Foard, Richard L. Thomas
- Preceded by: Robert Cather, James H. Jamar, John M. Miller, Samuel A. West
- Succeeded by: John W. Morgan, George Ricketts, Cornelius Smith

Personal details
- Born: 1826 near Port Deposit, Maryland, U.S.
- Died: February 2, 1884 (aged 57–58) Baltimore, Maryland, U.S.
- Resting place: West Nottingham Cemetery
- Education: West Nottingham Academy; Princeton University
- Occupation: Politician; merchant; lawyer

Milton Y. Kidd (1826 – February 2, 1884) was an American politician from Maryland. He served as a member of the Maryland House of Delegates, representing Cecil County in 1849, 1854 and 1858.

== Early life ==
Milton Y. Kidd was born in 1826 at the Kidd farm near Port Deposit, Maryland. He attended West Nottingham Academy and Princeton University.

== Career ==
He worked as a merchant and lawyer.

Kidd served as a member of the Maryland House of Delegates, representing Cecil County in 1849, 1854 and 1858.

In 1859, Kidd succeeded James W. Clayton as chief clerk of the House of Delegates. He served as chief clerk in 1860. In September 1861, while chief clerk, Kidd was arrested as a Southern sympathizer alongside members of the House of Delegates. He was required to give an oath to the United States prior to his release ten days later. In 1867, he served as secretary of the Maryland constitutional convention. He served as chief clerk from 1868 to 1880. At the time of his death, he was serving as journal clerk of the House of Delegates.

== Personal life ==
Kidd died from rheumatism on February 2, 1884, aged 57, in Baltimore. He was buried in West Nottingham Cemetery.
