= 1895 Maryland Attorney General election =

- November 5, 1895
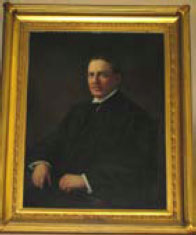

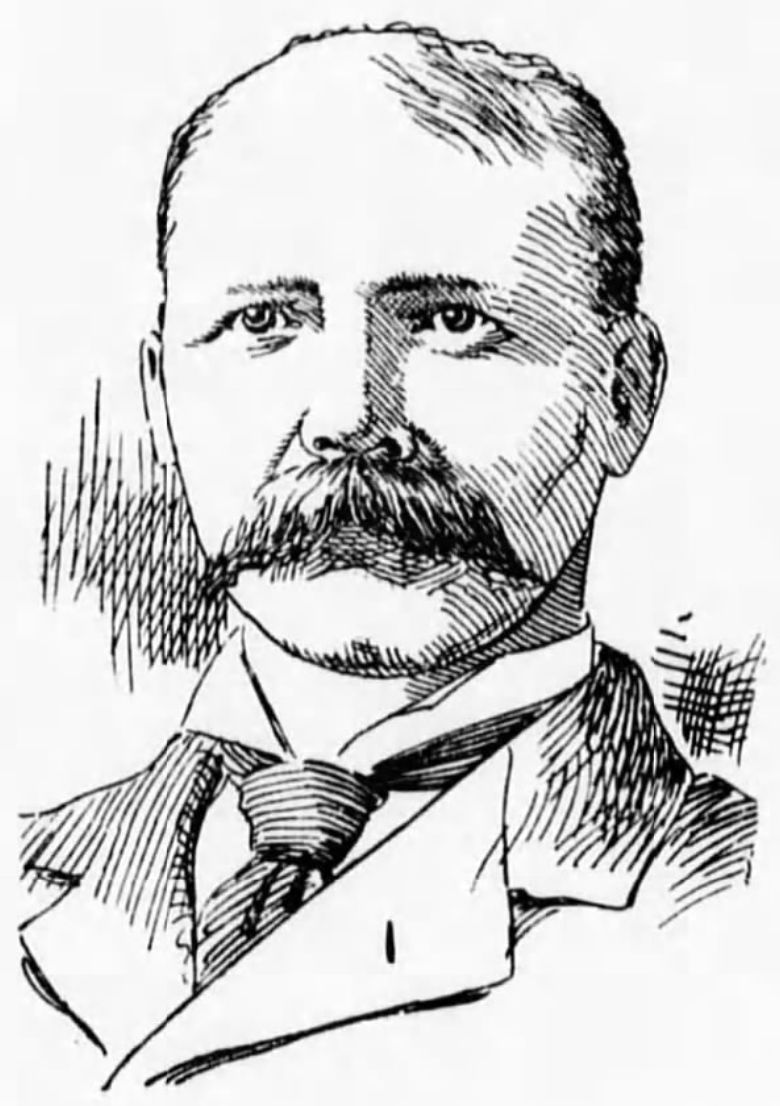
Nominee	Harry M. Clabaugh	Charles C. Crothers
Party	Republican	Democratic
Popular vote	122,855	106,518
Percentage	51.60%	44.74%
- County results Clabaugh: 40–50% 50–60% Crothers: 40–50% 50–60%
Attorney General before election
John Prentiss Poe
Democratic
Elected Attorney General
Harry M. Clabaugh
Republican

The 1895 Maryland attorney general election was held on November 5, 1895, in order to elect the attorney general of Maryland, held in the United States. Republican nominee Harry M. Clabaugh defeated Democratic nominee and incumbent member of the Maryland Senate Charles C. Crothers, Prohibition nominee William Frank Tucker and Independent candidate Bernard W. Monett.

== General election ==
On election day, November 5, 1895, Republican nominee Harry M. Clabaugh won the election by a margin of 16,337 votes against his foremost opponent Democratic nominee Charles C. Crothers, thereby gaining Republican control over the office of attorney general. Clabaugh was sworn in as the 21st attorney general of Maryland on January 3, 1896.

=== Results ===
Maryland Attorney General election, 1895
Party	Candidate	Votes	%
Republican	Harry M. Clabaugh	122,855	51.60
Democratic	Charles C. Crothers	106,518	44.74
Prohibition	William Frank Tucker	7,348	3.08
Independent	Bernard W. Monett	1,377	0.58
Total votes		238,098	100.00
Republican gain from Democratic			
