= William T. Beeks (Maryland politician) =

American politician (1829–1898)

Member of the Maryland House of Delegates from the Cecil County district
- In office 1892–1892 Serving with Joseph T. Grove and C. Frank Kirk
- Preceded by: Hiester Hess, William H. Simcoe, Thomas Pearce
- Succeeded by: Frank H. Mackie, Richard L. Thomas Jr., George S. Woolley

Personal details
- Born: March 20, 1829 near Chesapeake City, Maryland, U.S.
- Died: September 21, 1898 (aged 69) near Cecilton, Maryland, U.S.
- Party: Democratic
- Occupation: Politician; farmer

William T. Beeks (March 20, 1829 – September 21, 1898) was an American politician from Maryland. He served as a member of the Maryland House of Delegates, representing Cecil County in 1892.

== Early life ==
William T. Beeks was born on March 20, 1829, on a farm near Chesapeake City, Maryland, to Martha A. (née Cruikshank) and John L. Beeks. At a young age, his family moved to Baltimore County. At the age of 11, the family returned to live near Cecilton. He attended a county school in Cecilton. At the age of 18, his father died and he ran the family farm.

== Career ==
Beeks was a Democrat. He served as a member of the Maryland House of Delegates, representing Cecil County in 1892.

== Personal life ==
Beeks was married. He lived in Warwick.

Beeks died on September 21, 1898, at his home near Cecilton.
