= Joseph T. Grove =

American politician (1845–1927)

Member of the Maryland House of Delegates from the Cecil County district
- In office 1892–1892 Serving with William T. Beeks and C. Frank Kirk
- Preceded by: Hiester Hess, William H. Simcoe, Thomas Pearce
- Succeeded by: Frank H. Mackie, Richard L. Thomas Jr., George S. Woolley

Personal details
- Born: January 18, 1845 Lower Chanceford Township, Pennsylvania, U.S.
- Died: October 22, 1927 (aged 82) near Zion, Maryland, U.S.
- Resting place: Rosebank Cemetery; Calvert, Maryland, U.S.
- Party: Democratic
- Spouse: Cordelia McVey (died 1913)
- Children: 1
- Occupation: Politician; farmer

Joseph T. Grove (January 18, 1845 – October 22, 1927) was an American politician from Maryland. He served as a member of the Maryland House of Delegates, representing Cecil County in 1892.

== Early life ==
Joseph T. Grove was born on January 18, 1845, in Lower Chanceford Township, Pennsylvania, to Martha and Jacob Grove. He attended Pleasant Grove Academy in Pennsylvania.

== Career ==
In 1873, Grove moved to Cecil County, Maryland, and bought a farm near Zion. He worked there as a farmer. He also lived in Montgomery County for two years.

Grove served as a member of the Maryland House of Delegates, representing Cecil County in 1892. In 1903, he ran for judge of the orphans' court, but lost.

Grove was one of the incorporators of the Elkton Banking and Trust Company.

== Personal life ==
Grove married Cordelia McVey, daughter of Absolom McVey. She died in 1913. They had one daughter, Lila (or Lalla) Blanche.

Grove died on October 22, 1927, at his home near Zion. He was buried in Rosebank Cemetery in Calvert.
