= William J. Smith =

William J. Smith may refer to:

- Bill Smith (baseball manager), 19th century baseball manager
- William Jay Smith (Tennessee politician) (1823–1913)
- William J. Smith (Maryland politician) (1850–1906), American politician
- William Jay Smith (1918–2015), American poet

== See also ==
- William Smith (disambiguation)
