= Thomas Carruthers =

Thomas Carruthers may refer to:

- Thomas N. Carruthers (1900–1960), bishop of the Episcopal Diocese of South Carolina
- Thomas G. Carruthers (1929–2023), member of the Connecticut State Senate

== See also ==
- Thomas Caruthers (c. 1818–1867), member of the Texas House of Representatives
