= Carruthers =

Carruthers, sometimes Caruthers, is a Scottish surname and clan, originating from the lands of Carruthers in Dumfriesshire.

The place name is derived from the Cumbric elements caer ("fort") and Rhydderch (a personal name perhaps meaning "red ruler"), and so meaning "Rhydderch's fort", possibly in reference to Riderch I of Alt Clut.

As of 19 August 2019, Dr Simon Peter Carruthers of Holmains, 22nd of his line, was confirmed as Chief of the Name and Arms of Carruthers by the Lord Lyon King of Arms in Edinburgh, Scotland.

The family and clan are represented internationally by the Clan Carruthers Society (International)(CCS(I)) The Society was founded in January 2017 and is officially recognised by the Chief of Carruthers as representing the worldwide Carruthers family and the home of his clan. It has regional representatives in Africa, Australia, Canada, Europe, U.K. and the US. CCS(I) is non-commercial, apolitical and non-partisan and is open to any member of the international Carruthers family and derivatives of that name.

The Society is based in the United Kingdom, but is represented by an international Executive Council made up of senior members from the regions.

In Louisiana, Carruthers has evolved into Credeur, a gallicized form of the name; it is a common surname today in the southern part of the state.

== Notable people with the surname ==
- Bob Caruthers (1864–1911), American Major League Baseball player
- Bob Carruthers (politician), Canadian politician
- Charlene Carruthers (born 1985), American activist and author
- Chris Carruthers (born 1983), English footballer
- David Carruthers (born 1957), British businessman
- David Carruthers, Canadian curler
- Sir David Carruthers (born 1940/41), New Zealand judge
- Douglas Carruthers (1882–1962), British soldier, explorer, and naturalist
- Elizabeth Carruthers (born 1951), Canadian diver
- George Carruthers (born 1953), Convenor, Clan Carruthers Society
- George Robert Carruthers (1939–2020), American physicist and inventor
- Ian Carruthers, British National Health Service manager
- Jimmy Carruthers (1929–1990), Australian world champion boxer
- John Carruthers (disambiguation), multiple people
- Sir Joseph Carruthers (1857–1932), Premier of New South Wales from 1904 to 1907
- Kel Carruthers (born 1938), Australian world champion Grand Prix motorcycle racer
- Kitty Carruthers (born 1961), American pairs figure skater
- Mark Carruthers (born 1965), British talk show host on BBC
- Pamela Carruthers (1916–2009), British showjumping course designer
- Peter Carruthers (philosopher) (born 1952), British philosopher
- Peter Carruthers (figure skater) (born 1959), American pairs figure skater
- Peter A. Carruthers (1935–1997), American physicist
- Reid Carruthers (born 1984), Canadian curler
- Robert Carruthers (1799–1878), Scottish journalist and writer
- Robert L. Caruthers (1800–1882), American politician and judge, governor of Tennessee
- Samir Carruthers (born 1993), Irish footballer
- Steffi Carruthers (born 1993), Samoan tennis player
- Stuart Carruthers (born 1970) Australian field hockey player
- Thomas N. Carruthers (1900–1960), Episcopal bishop of South Carolina
- Thomas Caruthers (c. 1818–1867), Texas politician
- Wallace Bruce Matthews Carruthers (1863–1910), Canadian soldier and founder of the Canadian Signal Corps
- William Carruthers (1830–1922), British botanist
- Will Carruthers (born 1967), alternative rock musician

== Fictional characters ==
- Carruthers, protagonist of Robert Erskine Childers's novel The Riddle of the Sands
- Bob Carruthers, a character from the Sherlock Holmes story The Adventure of the Solitary Cyclist
- Elizabeth and Peter Carruthers, a married couple; she inherits his trading firm, Carruthers & Co., in the 2016 Discovery Channel/Netflix series Frontier
- Georgie Carruthers, protagonist of Ruby Dixon novel Ice Planet Barbarians
- Luis Carruthers, a character in the 1991 novel and 2000 film American Psycho
- Francine Carruthers, Antagonist of the 2009 TV Series The Electric Company
- Rachel Carruthers a fictional character in the Halloween series of slasher films
- Dame Carruthers, 'Housekeeper to the Tower' in Gilbert & Sullivan's opera The Yeomen of the Guard
- Lou Carruthers, owner of 'Lou's Cafe' in Back to the Future

== See also ==
- Carruthers Field, American military airbase at Benbrook, Texas, near Fort Worth, during World War I
- Clan Carruthers, a Border Reiver Clan and Family originating in the West March of the Anglo-Scottish Borders, Annandale, Dumfriesshire.
