= McCalls Ferry Farm =

- U.S. National Register of Historic Places
- U.S. Historic district
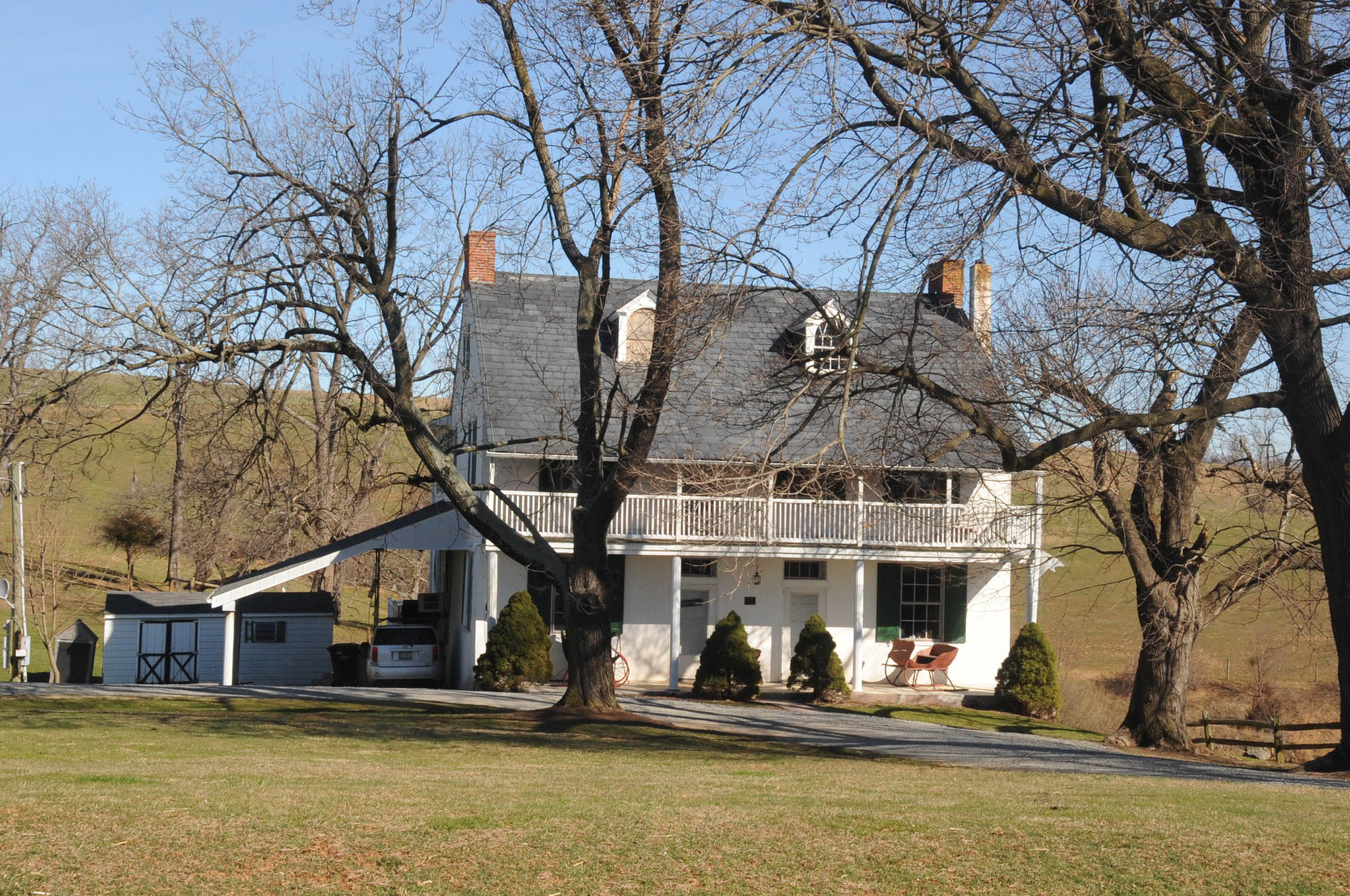
- Farmhouse

- Location within Pennsylvania Location within the United States
- Location: 447 McCalls Ferry Rd., Lower Chanceford Township, Pennsylvania
- Coordinates: 39°49′30″N 76°21′22″W
- Area: 300 acres (120 ha)
- Architectural style: Pennsylvania German
- NRHP reference No.: 00001344
- Added to NRHP: November 8, 2000

The McCalls Ferry Farm, also known as the Robert and Matthew McCall Farm, Atkins-Trout Farm, and Kilgore Farm, is an historic farm and national historic district located in Lower Chanceford Township in York County, Pennsylvania, United States.

It was listed on the National Register of Historic Places in 2000.

== History and architectural features ==
This district includes six contributing buildings and two contributing sites. The buildings are the farmhouse (c. 1790), Sweitzer barn (c. 1799), frame corn barn (c. 1799), tobacco barn (c. 1875), milk house (c. 1910), and chicken house (c. 1950). The farmhouse is a banked, Pennsylvania German, vernacular dwelling built of stone and coated in stucco. It measures forty feet wide and thirty feet deep, and has a slate-covered gable roof. The sites are the stone foundation of a scale house (c. 1875) and the ruins of a small dwelling (c. 1900).
