= Thomas Pearce (Maryland politician) =

American politician (died 1936)

Member of the Maryland House of Delegates from the Cecil County district
- In office 1890–1890 Serving with Hiester Hess and William H. Simcoe
- Preceded by: Stephen J. Caldwell, R. Covington Mackall, Michael Moore
- Succeeded by: William T. Beeks, Joseph T. Grove, C. Frank Kirk

Personal details
- Born: 1855 Cecil County, Maryland, US
- Died: January 1936 (aged 80) Elkton, Maryland, U.S.
- Resting place: Cecilton Cemetery
- Party: Democratic
- Occupation: Salesman

Thomas Pearce (c. 1855 – January 1936) was an American politician from Maryland. He served as a member of the Maryland House of Delegates, representing Cecil County in 1890.

== Biography ==
Pearce was born c. 1855 in the first district of Cecil County, Maryland. He worked as a machinary salesman.

In 1899, Pearce successfully ran for the Maryland House of Delegates as a Democrat, representing Cecil County. He served in the House in 1890, representing Cecil County. He served on the Committee of Roads and Highways, the Chesapeake Bay and its Tributaries. His brother, Eugene Pearce, was also a member of the Maryland House of Delegates at the same time.

Pearce was married; his wife predeceased him. He was a member of the Improved Order of Red Men of Cecilton.

Pearce died from pneumonia in January 1936, aged 80, at Union Hospital in Elkton. The Improved Order of Red Men organized his funeral, held at St. Stephens Epsicopal Church in Cecilton. He was buried in Cecilton Cemetery.
