= William B. Rowland =

American politician and physician (died 1885)

Member of the Maryland House of Delegates from the Cecil County district
- In office 1882–1884 Serving with James A. Lewis, Duncan Veazey, Henry Jones, Frank R. Scott
- Preceded by: Hiram McCullough, Joseph H. Steele, James M. Touchstone
- Succeeded by: Alfred B. McVey, J. G. Richards, Richard L. Thomas Jr.

Personal details
- Born: William Black Rowland Rowlandville, Maryland, U.S.
- Died: September 5, 1885 (aged 74) Philadelphia, Pennsylvania, U.S.
- Resting place: West Nottingham Cemetery
- Party: Democratic
- Spouse: Cassandra F. Sappington (m. 1846)
- Children: 4
- Occupation: Politician; physician; businessman

William Black Rowland (died September 5, 1885) was an American politician from Maryland. He served as a member of the Maryland House of Delegates, representing Cecil County from 1882 to 1884.

== Early life ==
William Black Rowland was born in Rowlandville, Maryland, to Mary (née Black) and Samuel Rowland. His father was a lumber dealer, fisherman, store owner, and postmaster. The town of Rowlandville was named after his father.

== Career ==
Rowland worked as a medical doctor for about 40 years. He ran the mercantile store Rowland & Tosh in Rowlandville.

Rowland was a Democrat. He ran for Maryland Senate against Jacob Tome in 1866, but lost. He served as a member of the Maryland House of Delegates, representing Cecil County from 1882 to 1884.

== Personal life ==
Rowland married Cassandra F. Sappington, the daughter of Dr. John K. Sappington of Havre de Grace, on April 16, 1846. They had two sons and two daughters: Samuel, William, Helen, and Mrs. R. C. Hopkins. He lived near Rowlandville. He was a member of the West Nottingham Presbyterian Church.

Rowland died on September 5, 1885, aged 74, at a hospital in Philadelphia during a lithotomy operation. He was buried at West Nottingham Cemetery.
