= Hiester Hess =

American politician (died 1922)

Member of the Maryland House of Delegates from the Cecil County district
- In office 1890–1890 Serving with Thomas Pearce and William H. Simcoe
- Preceded by: Stephen J. Caldwell, R. Covington Mackall, Michael Moore
- Succeeded by: William T. Beeks, Joseph T. Grove, C. Frank Kirk

Personal details
- Born: Isaac Hiester Hess
- Died: July 2, 1922 (aged 67) near Elkton, Maryland, U.S.
- Resting place: Sharp's Cemetery
- Party: Democratic
- Education: Heidelberg University
- Alma mater: Princeton University (AB, AM)
- Occupation: Politician; lawyer

Isaac Hiester Hess (died July 2, 1922) was an American politician and lawyer from Maryland. He served as a member of the Maryland House of Delegates, representing Cecil County in 1890.

== Early life ==
Isaac Hiester Hess was born to Elizabeth N. (née Clemson) and Henry Hess. His father was a farmer and hotelier. He attended public schools in Cecil County and Elkton Academy. He graduated from Princeton University in 1878 with a Bachelor of Arts in mathematics. He studied one year at Heidelberg University in Germany. He graduated with a Master of Arts from Princeton University in 1881. He read law in the office of judge Stanley Matthews. He received a Bachelor of Laws associated with the Supreme Court of Ohio in 1881.

== Career ==
Hess was a Democrat. He served as a member of the Maryland House of Delegates, representing Cecil County in 1890.

Hess was counsel to the board of supervisors of elections and to the board of county commissioners. He was appointed as supervisor of state tax assessments for Cecil County in April 1920. He served in that role until his death.

In April 1910, Hess was one of the incorporators of the Elkton, Fairhill & Oxford Electric Railway & Power Company.

== Personal life ==
Hess lived in Fair Hill.

Hess died on July 2, 1922, aged 67, at Glen Mary near Elkton. He was buried in Sharp's Cemetery.
