= John Carruthers =

John Carruthers may refer to:

- John Carruthers (politician) (1863–1949), member of the Canadian House of Commons
- John Carruthers (engineer) (1836–1914), New Zealand engineer and economic theorist
- John Carruthers (cricketer) (born 1970), English cricketer
- John Carruthers (footballer) (1900–1959), English footballer
- John Carruthers (surveyor) (1847–1942), pioneer of South Australia
- John Valentine Carruthers (born 1958), English musician, guitarist and composer
- John Franklin Bruce Carruthers (1889–1960), American minister
