= Harry A. Cantwell =

American politician and physician (died 1972)

Member of the Maryland Senate from the Cecil County district
- In office 1922–1926
- Preceded by: Omar D. Crothers
- Succeeded by: Cecil Clyde Squier

Personal details
- Born: Harry Arthur Cantwell
- Died: December 20, 1972 (aged 89) Sarasota, Florida, U.S.
- Resting place: St. Mary Anne's Episcopal Church; North East, Maryland, U.S.
- Party: Democratic
- Spouse: Anne White
- Children: 3
- Education: University of Maryland
- Occupation: Politician; physician

Harry Arthur Cantwell (died December 20, 1972) was an American politician and physician from Maryland. He served as a member of the Maryland Senate, representing Cecil County from 1922 to 1926.

== Early life ==
Harry Arthur Cantwell graduated from Tome School in 1902. He graduated from the University of Maryland in 1906. He worked as an intern at the University of Maryland and Kernan Hospital in Baltimore.

== Career ==
=== Medical career ===
Cantwell opened a medical office in Charlestown in 1907. He later opened an office in North East. He was chief of the surgical staff at Union Hospital in Elkton from 1921 to 1954.

In 1931, Cantwell was elected fellow of the American College of Surgeons. During World War II, he worked as medical director and consulting surgeon of the Navy's Triumph Explosives plant. In 1950, he became a fellow of the International College of Surgeons and in 1951, he became fellow of the American chapter of the same organization. He served as a member of the board of directors for 16 years at the Eastern Shore State Hospital. He worked as a consultant to the Veterans Administration Hospital at Perry Point.

=== Political career ===
Cantwell was a Democrat. He was a member of the Maryland Senate, representing Cecil County, from 1922 to 1926.

During World War I, Cantwell served on the Selective Service Board of Cecil County. He served as a presidential elector for Maryland in 1940.

== Personal life ==
Cantwell married Anne White. They had one son and two daughters, John A., Nancy and Ruth Elizabeth.

Cantwell moved to Florida in 1967. Cantwell died on December 20, 1972, at the age of 89, at East Manor Nursing Home in Sarasota, Florida. He was buried at St. Mary Anne's Episcopal Church in North East.

== Legacy ==
In 1956, a wing at Union Hospital was named after Cantwell.
