= Richard L. Thomas Jr. =

American politician (1856–1898)

Member of the Maryland House of Delegates from the Cecil County district
- In office 1894–1894 Serving with Frank H. Mackie and George S. Woolley
- Preceded by: William T. Beeks, Joseph T. Grove, C. Frank Kirk
- Succeeded by: Lewis T. Logan, William J. Smith, Webster White
- In office 1886–1886 Serving with Alfred B. McVey and J. G. Richards
- Preceded by: Henry Jones, William B. Rowland, Frank R. Scott
- Succeeded by: Stephen J. Caldwell, R. Covington Mackall, Michael Moore

Personal details
- Born: 1856 North East, Maryland, U.S.
- Died: December 11, 1898 (aged 41–42) Baltimore, Maryland, U.S.
- Party: Democratic
- Parent: Richard L. Thomas (father)

Richard L. Thomas Jr. (1856 – December 11, 1898) was an American politician from Maryland. He served as a member of the Maryland House of Delegates, representing Cecil County in 1886 and in 1894.

== Early life ==
Richard L. Thomas Jr. was born in 1856 in North East, Maryland, to Ruth Ann (née McCracken) and Richard L. Thomas. His father was a judge, merchant, postmaster and served as state delegate.

== Career ==
Thomas was a Democrat. He served as a member of the Maryland House of Delegates, representing Cecil County in 1886 and in 1894.

From 1896 to his death, Thomas worked in the office of internal revenue in Baltimore.

== Personal life ==
Thomas died from pneumonia on December 11, 1898, at the Maryland Hospital in Baltimore.
