= Cecil Kirk =

American politician (died 1944)

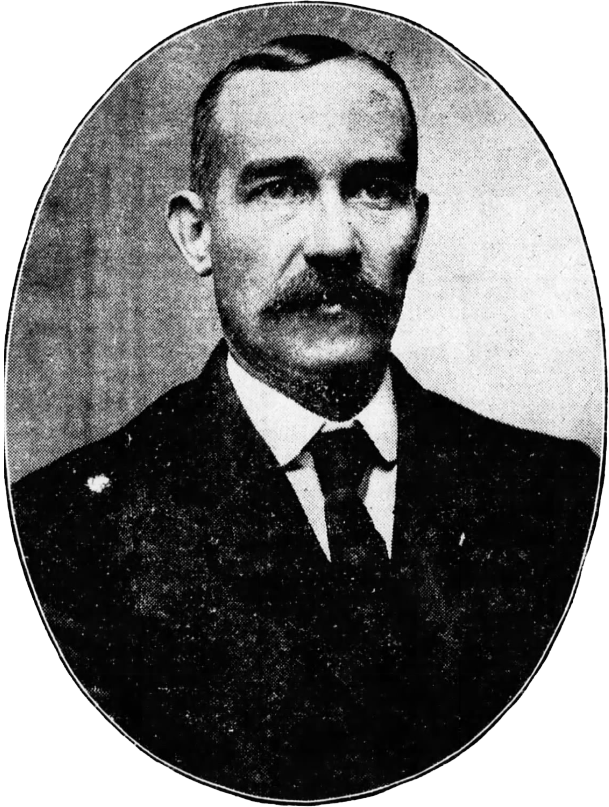
- Kirk in 1905 newspaper

Member of the Maryland House of Delegates from the Cecil County district
- In office 1904–1906 Serving with William T. Fryer and Samuel J. Keys

Personal details
- Born: March 1868 Principio, Cecil County, Maryland, U.S.
- Died: January 7, 1944 (aged 75) near Colora, Maryland, U.S.
- Resting place: Hopewell Cemetery near Port Deposit, Maryland, U.S.
- Party: Republican
- Spouse: Alice Davis
- Children: 3
- Occupation: Politician

Cecil Kirk (March 1868 – January 7, 1944) was an American politician from Maryland. He served as a member of the Maryland House of Delegates, representing Cecil County from 1904 to 1906.

== Early life ==
Cecil Kirk was born in March 1868 in Principio, Cecil County, Maryland, to Elizabeth (née Buckley) and William Kirk. He was educated at West Nottingham Academy.

== Career ==
As of 1904, Kirk worked in the steam threshing business. He also worked as a farmer in Rising Sun.

Kirk was a Republican. He was a member of the Maryland House of Delegates, representing Cecil County, from 1904 to 1906. He was elected as sheriff of Cecil County in 1905, defeating William T. Jenness. He served as sheriff of Cecil County from 1906 to 1910 and as clerk of the circuit court for six years, starting in 1910.

== Personal life ==
Kirk married Alice Davis. He had two sons and one daughter, Curtis, Cecil Jr. and Mrs. Paul McKee. In 1904, Kirk lived near Woodlawn.

Kirk died on January 7, 1944, at the age of 75, at his home near Colora. He was buried at Hopewell Cemetery near Port Deposit.
