= John H. Kimble =

American politician (died 1938)

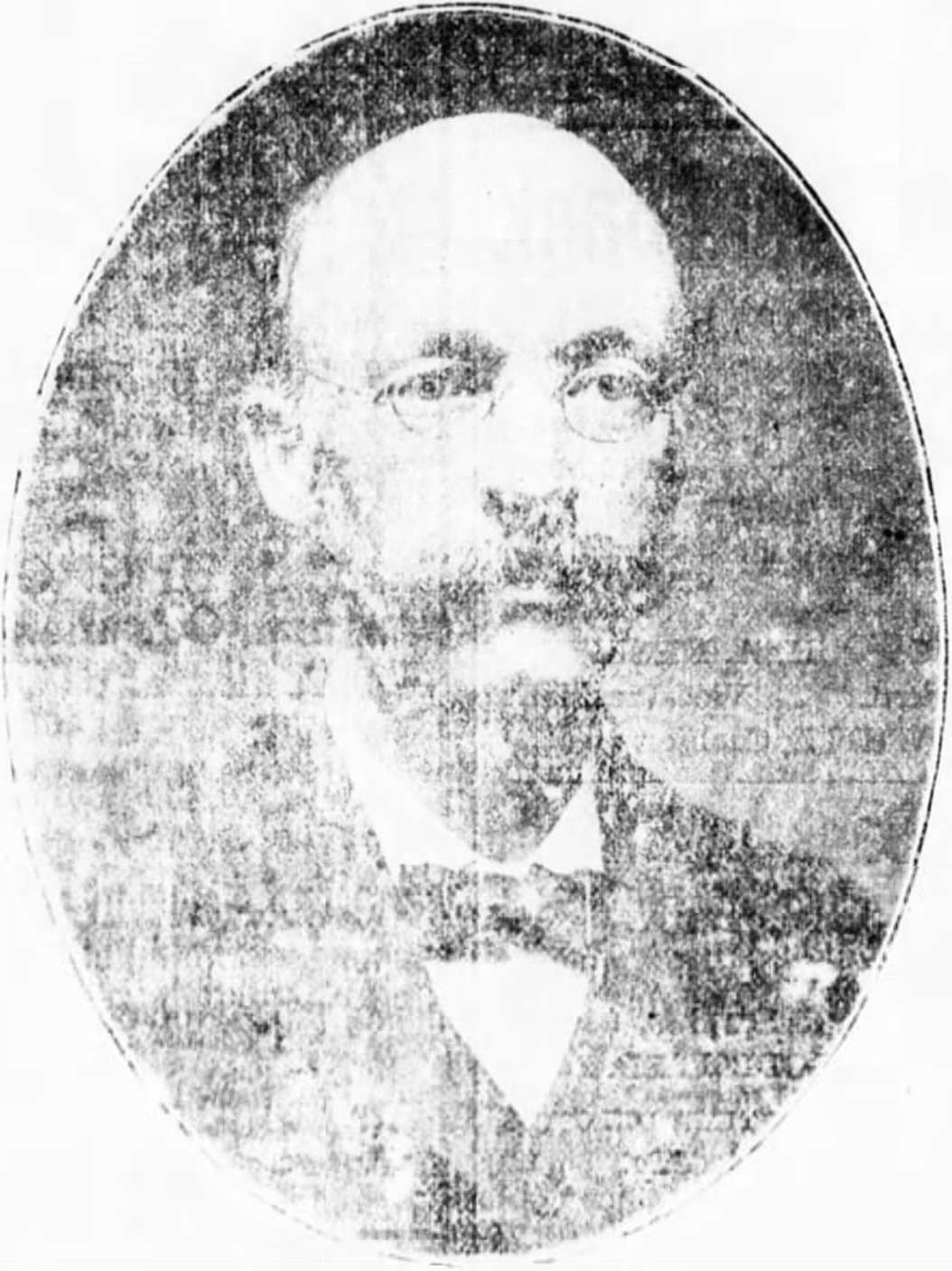
- Kimble in 1904 newspaper

Member of the Maryland House of Delegates from the Cecil County district
- In office 1900–1901 Serving with Samuel J. Keys and Frank H. Mackie

Personal details
- Born: Nottingham, Pennsylvania, U.S.
- Died: August 16, 1938 (aged 80) Port Deposit, Maryland, U.S.
- Resting place: Hopewell Cemetery
- Party: Democratic
- Children: 2
- Occupation: Politician

John H. Kimble (died August 16, 1938) was an American politician from Maryland. He served as a member of the Maryland House of Delegates, representing Cecil County from 1900 to 1901.

== Early life ==
John H. Kimble was born in Nottingham, Pennsylvania, to Mary Kirk and Anson Bennett Kimble. His father was a farmer.

== Career ==
Kimble worked as a cashier at Cecil National Bank in Port Deposit, Maryland, when he was younger. He worked as treasurer of Tome School for 40 years. Kimble worked for farming organizations in Cecil County. He was president of the National Association of Farm Bureaus.

Kimble was a Democrat. He served as a member of the Maryland House of Delegates, representing Cecil County from 1900 to 1901.

Kimble was president of the Mutual Fire Insurance Company of Cecil County at the time of his death. He also served as president of the Tome Memorial Church board.

== Personal life ==
Kimble married and had one son and one daughter, Chester T. and May. He died on August 16, 1938, at the age of 80, at his home near Port Deposit. He was buried at Hopewell Cemetery.
