= Stephen J. Caldwell =

American politician (died 1919)

Member of the Maryland House of Delegates from the Cecil County district
- In office 1888–1888 Serving with R. Covington Mackall and Michael Moore
- Preceded by: Alfred B. McVey, J. G. Richards, Richard L. Thomas Jr.
- Succeeded by: Hiester Hess, Thomas Pearce, William H. Simcoe

Personal details
- Born: New Valley, Cecil County, Maryland, U.S.
- Died: March 27, 1919 (aged 61) Baltimore, Maryland, U.S.
- Resting place: West Nottingham Cemetery
- Party: Democratic
- Occupation: Politician; telegraph operator; real estate agent

Stephen J. Caldwell (died March 27, 1919) was an American politician from Maryland. He served as a member of the Maryland House of Delegates, representing Cecil County in 1888.

== Early life ==
Caldwell was born in New Valley, Cecil County, Maryland, to Roseanna and Thomas J. Caldwell.

== Career ==
Caldwell was a telegraph operator and station agent at the Conowingo station of the Columbia and Port Deposit Railroad. On May 15, 1895, he resigned from the station and moved to Hagerstown to join the Potomac Pulp Company as a manager.

Caldwell served as a member of the Maryland House of Delegates, representing Cecil County in 1888. In April 1888, he was reappointed station agent at the Conowingo station. He worked in the role for 17 years.

In 1902, Caldwell was elected director of the Conowingo Bridge Company. He later worked for the Susquehanna Water Power Company in Wrightsville, Pennsylvania, as a general manager. He resigned from the role and operated a real estate office at 3 East Lexington Street in Baltimore until his death.

== Personal life ==
Caldwell did not marry. His brother C. C. Caldwell was president of the Eureka Fertilizer Company.

Around 1913, Caldwell had a stroke and lost movement in his right side. He died on March 27, 1919, aged 61, at Maryland General Hospital in Baltimore. He was buried at West Nottingham Cemetery.
