= Richard L. Thomas =

American politician (1809–1888)

Member of the Maryland House of Delegates from the Cecil County district
- In office 1854–1854 Serving with Richard I. Foard and Milton Y. Kidd
- Preceded by: John W. Morgan, George Ricketts, Cornelius Smith
- Succeeded by: Samuel Miller, David Scott, Slater B. Stubbs
- In office 1849–1849 Serving with Noble Biddle, Richard I. Foard, Milton Y. Kidd
- Preceded by: Robert Cather, James H. Jamar, John M. Miller, Samuel A. West
- Succeeded by: John W. Morgan, George Ricketts, Cornelius Smith

Personal details
- Born: June 30, 1809 New Castle County, Delaware, U.S.
- Died: June 17, 1888 (aged 78) North East, Maryland, U.S.
- Resting place: North East Methodist Episcopal Church Cemetery
- Party: Democratic
- Spouse(s): Sarah Ann Johnson (m. 1830; died 1838) Ruth Ann McCracken (m. 1845; died 1867)
- Children: 8, including Richard L. Jr.
- Occupation: Politician; manufacturer; merchant; judge

Richard L. Thomas (June 30, 1809 – June 17, 1888) was an American politician from Maryland. He served as a member of the Maryland House of Delegates, representing Cecil County in 1849 and in 1854.

== Early life ==
Richard L. Thomas was born on June 30, 1809, in New Castle County, Delaware, to Hannah (née Evalt) and Samuel Thomas. His father worked at Rose Hill. While a child, the family moved to Sassafras Neck, Cecil County, Maryland. At the age of 15, he apprenticed woolen good manufacturing at Pike Creek near Stanton, Delaware. He remained there for three years until the employer failed.

== Career ==
Thomas moved to Cecil County and worked at the wool factory of Charles Johnson. In 1842, he began working in the mercantile business in North East. He owned a store until his death.

Thomas was a Democrat. He served as postmaster of North East for four years under both Presidents Tyler and Polk. He served as a member of the Maryland House of Delegates, representing Cecil County in 1849 and in 1854. In his last term, he was supportive of the temperance reform movement. In 1879, he was elected as judge of the orphans' court. He served one four-year term.

He assisted in the chartering of the Cecil Bank at Port Deposit. He also served as trustee of the almshouse for three terms and was a member of the board of managers of the Cecil County Fire Insurance Company and the board of discount of the National Bank of Elkton.

== Personal life ==
Thomas married Sarah Ann Johnson, daughter of wool factory owner Charles Johnson and Mary Johnson, in 1830. They had no children and she died in 1838. In 1845, he married Ruth Ann McCracken, daughter of Martha Jane and John McCracken. They had one son and seven daughters, Martha Ruth, Sarah Rebecca, Mary Ann, Mrs. Thomas A. Worrell, Elizabeth, Richard L. Jr., Emily and Ida. His wife died in 1867. His son Richard also served in the state legislature. In 1830, he became a member of the Methodist Episcopal Church.

Thomas died following kidney problems on June 17, 1888, at his home in North East. He was buried in North East Methodist Episcopal Church Cemetery.
