= Samuel J. Keys =

American politician and businessman (1847–1924)

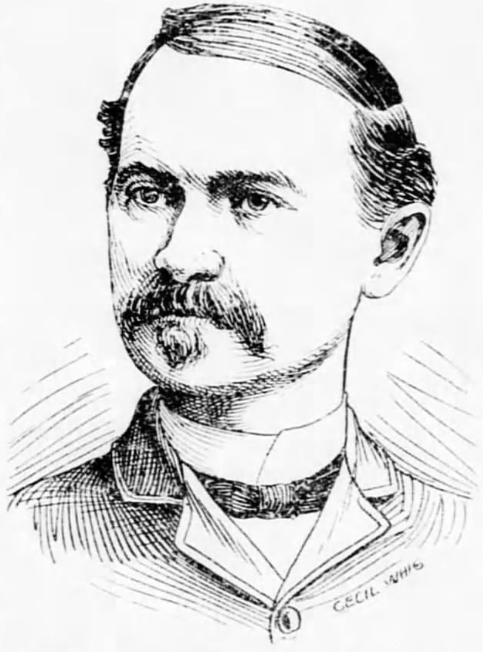
- Sketch of Keys in 1894 newspaper

Member of the Maryland House of Delegates from the Cecil County district
- In office 1910–1912 Serving with George W. Cosden and Adam Peeples
- In office 1904–1906 Serving with William T. Fryer and Cecil Kirk
- In office 1900–1901 Serving with Frank H. Mackie and John H. Kimble

Personal details
- Born: August 1847 Vienna, Maryland, U.S.
- Died: May 12, 1924 (aged 76) Elkton, Maryland, U.S.
- Resting place: Elkton Cemetery; Elkton, Maryland, U.S.
- Party: Democratic
- Spouse: Mary H. Hopkins (m. 1873)
- Children: 1
- Occupation: Politician; businessman

Samuel J. Keys (August 1847 – May 12, 1924) was an American politician and businessman from Maryland. He served as mayor of Elkton, Maryland, from 1898 to 1900. He served as a member of the Maryland House of Delegates, representing Cecil County from 1900 to 1901, in 1904 and in 1910.

== Early life ==
Samuel J. Keys was born in August 1847 in Vienna, Dorchester County, Maryland, to Ann M. (née Spedden) and Samuel Keys. His father was a shoe manufacturer and salesman. He attended public schools and Vienna Academy.

== Career ==
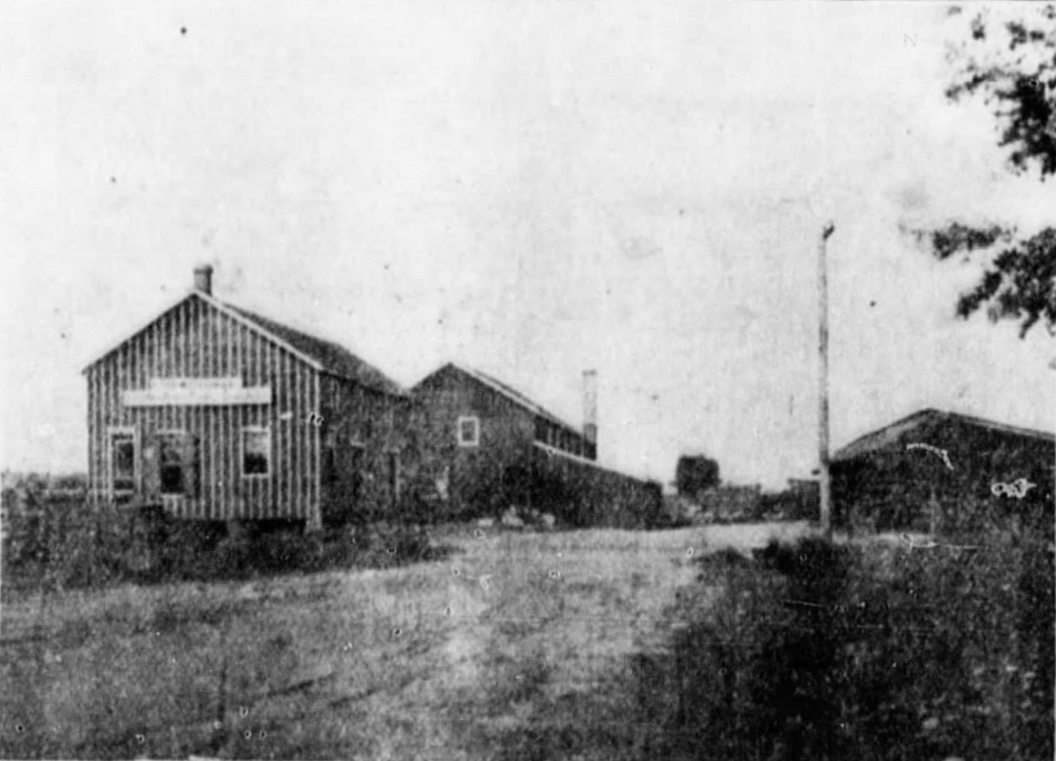
Keys & Miller Lumber Company (c. 1909)

Keys worked in the produce business in Vienna. Keys moved to Elkton in 1872 or 1873 and worked in the produce business. He later purchased Mr. Miller's interest in the Davis & Miller Lumber Company. The business was renamed Davis & Keys with his partner Colonel I. D. Davis until Mr. Miller re-entered the business and it was named Davis, Keys & Co. In 1890, the business was incorporated as The Keys & Miller Lumber Company was Keys as president. He served in that role until his death. He also owned additional real estate in Elkton.

Keys served as town commissioner in Elkton. Keys ran for mayor of Elkton in 1896, but lost. He was elected as mayor of Elkton in 1898, defeating incumbent George B. Kerfoot. He assumed office on May 10, 1898, and served until May 1900.

Keys was a Democrat. He was a member of the Maryland House of Delegates, representing Cecil County, from 1900 to 1901, in 1904 and in 1910.

Keys served as director of the Cecil Mutual Fire Insurance Company and the Mutual Building Association. He was a trustee and member of the board of the Elkton Methodist Episcopal Church.

== Personal life ==
Keys married Mary H. Hopkins, daughter of Ezekiel Hopkins and cousin of Johns Hopkins, in 1873. Keys had one daughter, Mabel (who married John B. Hinckley). He was a member of the Methodist Episcopal Church.

Keys died on May 12, 1924, at his home in Elkton. He was buried in Elkton Cemetery.
