= Frank R. Scott =

American politician (1856–1917)

Member of the Maryland House of Delegates from the Cecil County district
- In office 1884–1884 Serving with Henry Jones and William B. Rowland
- Preceded by: James A. Lewis, Duncan Veazey, William Rowland
- Succeeded by: Alfred B. McVey, J. G. Richards, Richard L. Thomas Jr.

Personal details
- Born: August 11, 1856 Elkton, Maryland, U.S.
- Died: March 2, 1917 (aged 60) Elkton, Maryland, U.S.
- Resting place: Elkton Cemetery
- Party: Democratic
- Spouse: Rachael J. Wilson (m. 1882)
- Children: 5
- Occupation: Politician; businessman; postmaster; bank president

Frank R. Scott (August 11, 1856 – March 2, 1917) was an American politician from Maryland. He served as a member of the Maryland House of Delegates, representing Cecil County in 1884.

== Early life ==
Frank R. Scott was born on August 11, 1856, in Elkton, Maryland, to Mary J. (née Wilson) and David Scott. His father was clerk of the circuit court and the state weigher of livestock. Scott was educated in Elkton Academy and took a business course at Eastman's Commercial College in Poughkeepsie, New York.

== Career ==
In 1875, Scott joined his father's office as an assistant. In 1879, he worked for the fertilizer business ran by his father and uncle. He ran it with his father, uncle and their business partner William H. Mackall until 1887. In 1887, he organized the Scott Fertilizer Company and became its first president. He served as president until his death. He also succeeded his father as director of the National Bank of Elkton and continued in that role until January 1, 1897.

Scott was a Democrat. He served as a member of the Maryland House of Delegates, representing Cecil County in 1884. He also served as town treasurer.

Scott was appointed by Governor Frank Brown as the World's Fair Commissioner for Maryland. In April 1894, he was appointed as postmaster of Elkton. He served in that role until 1898. At the time of his death, Scott was president of the National Bank of Elkton.

== Personal life ==
In 1882, Scott married Rachael J. Wilson of Elkton. They had five children, Edith W., David, DeLancey, Elizabeth and John Wirt.

Scott died on March 2, 1917, at his home on East Main Street in Elkton. He was buried at Elkton Cemetery.
