= James Weinroth =

American politician and lawyer (died 1957)

Member of the Maryland Senate from the Cecil County district
- In office 1955 – March 22, 1957
- Preceded by: Margaret J. Crothers
- Succeeded by: Guy Johnson

Personal details
- Born: James C. Weinroth Philadelphia, Pennsylvania, U.S.
- Died: March 22, 1957 Philadelphia, Pennsylvania, U.S.
- Resting place: Mount Lebanon Cemetery
- Party: Democratic
- Spouse: Sylvia
- Children: 2
- Education: University of Pennsylvania (BS); Temple Law School
- Occupation: Politician; lawyer

James C. Weinroth (died March 22, 1957) was an American politician and lawyer from Maryland. He served as a member of the Maryland Senate, representing Cecil County, from 1955 to his death in 1957.

== Early life ==
James C. Weinroth was born in Philadelphia, Pennsylvania, to George and Sara Weinroth. The family moved to Cecilton, Maryland, when Weinroth was a child. Weinroth attended public schools in Cecil County, Maryland. He graduated with a Bachelor of Science in economics from the University of Pennsylvania in 1927. He graduated from Temple Law School in 1933.

== Career ==
Weinroth was a member of the law firm headed by his cousin Leo Weinroth. Weinroth was a trial magistrate in Cecil County from 1947 to 1951. He served as counsel to the board of license commissioners.

Weinroth was a Democrat. He served as a member of the Maryland Senate, representing Cecil County, from 1955 to his death.

== Personal life ==
Weinroth married Sylvia. They had one son and one daughter, G. Jay and Myra A. Weinroth lived in Elkton, Maryland.

Weinroth was in a car accident on the Revell Highway near Annapolis on March 12, 1957, suffering injuries to his ribs and head. Weinroth died on March 22, 1957, at the age of 49 or 50, following an operation to remove a brain tumor at Mount Sinai Hospital in Philadelphia. He was buried at Mount Lebanon Cemetery.
