= Michael Moore (Maryland politician) =

American politician (died 1903)

Member of the Maryland House of Delegates from the Cecil County district
- In office 1888–1888 Serving with Stephen J. Caldwell and R. Covington Mackall
- Preceded by: Alfred B. McVey, J. G. Richards, Richard L. Thomas Jr.
- Succeeded by: Hiester Hess, Thomas Pearce, William H. Simcoe

Personal details
- Born: Michael M. Moore
- Died: December 5, 1903 Havre de Grace, Maryland, U.S.
- Party: Democratic
- Spouse: Martha Kurtz
- Children: 8, including Leo M.
- Occupation: Politician

Michael M. Moore (died December 5, 1903) was an American politician from Maryland. He served as a member of the Maryland House of Delegates, representing Cecil County, in 1888.

== Career ==
Michael M. Moore was a Democrat. He served as a member of the Maryland House of Delegates, representing Cecil County, in 1888.

He worked as a watchman at the State Capitol in Annapolis.

== Personal life ==
Moore married Martha Kurtz. They had eight children. Their son Leo M. also served in the Maryland House of Delegates.

Moore died on December 5, 1903, at the age of 57 or 58, at his home in Havre de Grace, Maryland.
