= Lower Chanceford Township, Pennsylvania =

Township in Pennsylvania, US

Coordinates: 39°48′00″N 76°20′59″W

- Township
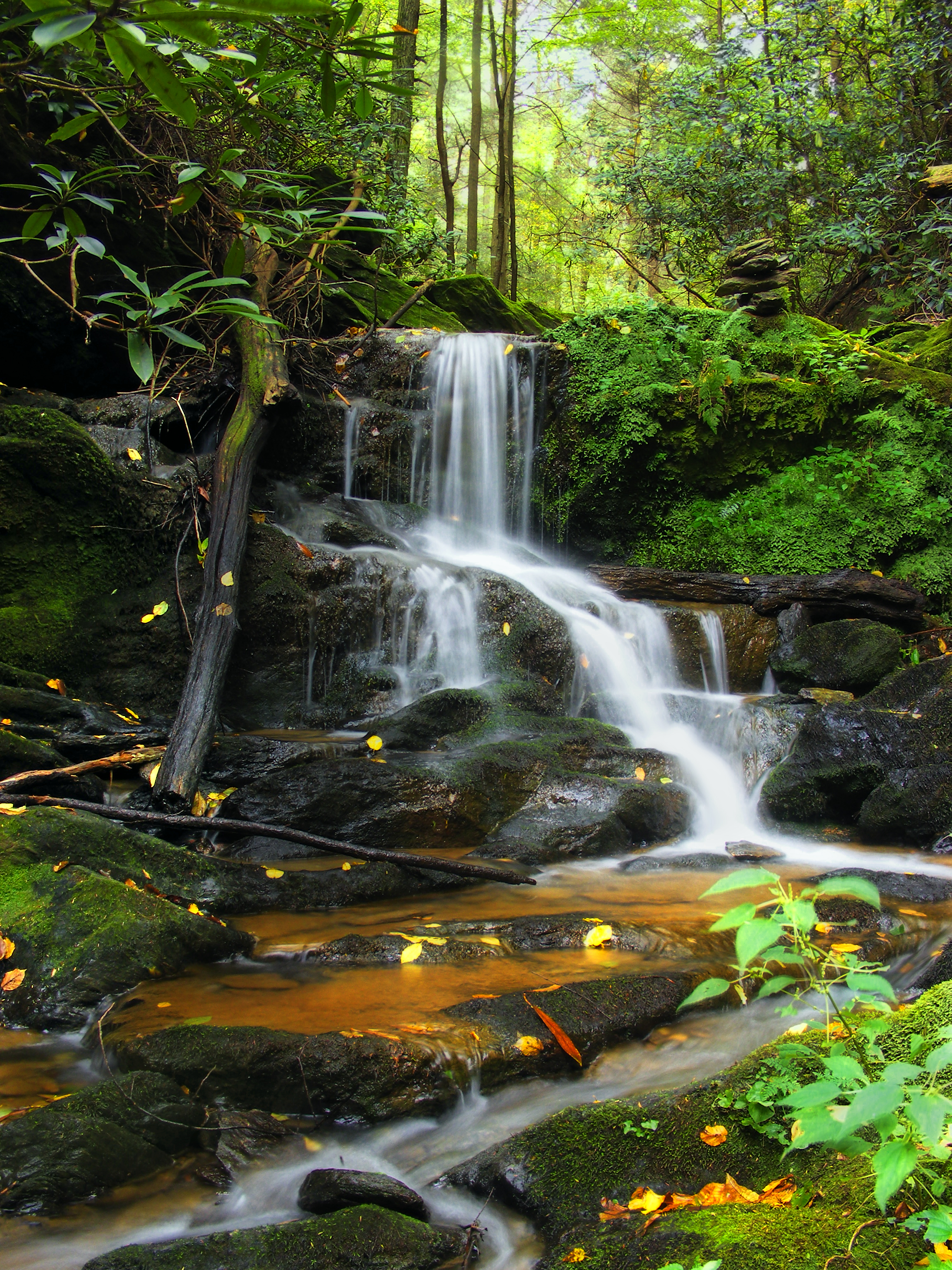
- Oakland Run waterfalls as seen from the Mason-Dixon Trail

- Location in York County and the state of Pennsylvania.
- Country: United States
- State: Pennsylvania
- County: York
- Settled: 1734
- Incorporated: 1805

Government
  - Type: Board of Supervisors

Area
  - Total: 41.70 sq mi (108.00 km^{2})
  - Land: 41.51 sq mi (107.50 km^{2})
  - Water: 0.19 sq mi (0.50 km^{2})

Population (2020)
  - Total: 3,032 ▲
  - Estimate (2023): 3,065
  - Density: 74.1/sq mi (28.61/km^{2})
- Time zone: UTC-5 (Eastern (EST))
  - Summer (DST): UTC-4 (EDT)
- Area code: 717
- FIPS code: 42-133-44872
- Website: Township website

Historical population
Census	Pop.	Note	%±
1850	1,637		—
1860	2,160		31.9%
1870	2,306		6.8%
1880	2,471		7.2%
1890	2,512		1.7%
1900	2,345		−6.6%
1910	2,081		−11.3%
1920	1,830		−12.1%
1930	1,711		−6.5%
1940	1,730		1.1%
1950	1,582		−8.6%
1990	2,454		—
2000	2,899		18.1%
2010	3,028		4.4%
2020	3,032		0.1%
2023 (est.)	3,065		1.1%
U.S. Decennial Census

Lower Chanceford Township is a township in York County, Pennsylvania, United States. The population was 3,032 at the 2020 census.

== History ==
The Muddy Creek Bridge, Maryland and Pennsylvania Railroad, Indian Steps Cabin, and McCalls Ferry Farm are listed on the National Register of Historic Places.

== Geography ==
According to the United States Census Bureau, the township has a total area of 41.7 square miles (108 km^{2}), of which 41.6 square miles (108 km^{2}) is land and 0.1 square miles (0.26 km^{2}), or 0.34%, is water.

== Demographics ==
As of the census of 2000, there were 2,899 people, 1,028 households, and 793 families living in the township. The population density was 69.7 inhabitants per square mile (26.9/km^{2}). There were 1,169 housing units at an average density of 28.1 per square mile (10.8/km^{2}). The racial makeup of the township was 97.93% White, 0.41% African American, 0.34% Native American, 0.55% Asian, 0.07% Pacific Islander, 0.31% from other races, and 0.38% from two or more races. Hispanic or Latino of any race were 0.41% of the population.

There were 1,028 households, out of which 38.4% had children under the age of 18 living with them, 65.9% were married couples living together, 6.5% had a female householder with no husband present, and 22.8% were non-families. 19.3% of all households were made up of individuals, and 6.8% had someone living alone who was 65 years of age or older. The average household size was 2.82 and the average family size was 3.24.

In the township the population was spread out, with 30.0% under the age of 18, 7.4% from 18 to 24, 31.0% from 25 to 44, 22.3% from 45 to 64, and 9.2% who were 65 years of age or older. The median age was 35 years. For every 100 females, there were 104.4 males. For every 100 females age 18 and over, there were 103.0 males.

The median income for a household in the township was $43,081, and the median income for a family was $48,063. Males had a median income of $37,042 versus $21,890 for females. The per capita income for the township was $17,821. About 5.4% of families and 7.6% of the population were below the poverty line, including 12.0% of those under age 18 and 9.1% of those age 65 or over.

== Notable people ==
- Joseph T. Grove (1845–1927), Maryland state delegate
