= R. Covington Mackall =

American politician and physician (1822–1902)

Member of the Maryland House of Delegates from the Cecil County district
- In office 1888–1890 Serving with Stephen J. Caldwell and Michael Moore
- Preceded by: Alfred B. McVey, J. G. Richards, Richard L. Thomas Jr.
- Succeeded by: Hiester Hess, Thomas Pearce, William H. Simcoe

Personal details
- Born: Richard Covington Mackall; January 14, 1822 near Elkton, Maryland, U.S.
- Died: February 16, 1902 (aged 80) Elkton, Maryland, U.S.
- Resting place: Elkton Cemetery; Elkton, Maryland, U.S.
- Party: Democratic
- Spouse(s): Harriet Gibson Bennett (died 1850) Isabella Hollingsworth (m. 1854; died 1893)
- Children: 1
- Education: Baltimore Dental College; University of Maryland School of Medicine
- Occupation: Politician; dentist; newspaper editor; writer

Richard Covington Mackall (January 14, 1822 – February 16, 1902) was an American politician, physician and newspaper editor from Maryland. He served as a member of the Maryland House of Delegates, representing Cecil County from 1888 to 1890.

== Early life ==
Richard Covington Mackall was born on January 14, 1822, at Wilna, near Elkton, Maryland. He was educated at New London Academy and Bel Air Academy. He graduated as a member of the first class of the Baltimore Dental College in 1841. After graduating, Mackall moved to St. Louis, Missouri, and practiced dentistry there. He then graduated from the University of Maryland School of Medicine.

== Career ==
After graduating, Mackall practiced medicine in Virginia and then Savannah, Georgia. His family then moved to Falls Church, Virginia. During the Civil War, he was a southern sympathizer. He was arrested by federal authorities, but was paroled, and moved back to Wilna. In 1871, Mackall served as school commissioner of Cecil County and became a member of the board of general assessors.

In 1873, Mackall purchased half interest in the Cecil Democrat and replaced Mr. Cruikshank as editor there. He owned the paper until 1876. He also wrote for magazines and newspapers. Mackall was a Democrat. He served as a member of the Maryland House of Delegates, representing Cecil County from 1888 to 1890.

Mackall worked to help establish the University Extension Course in Elkton.

== Personal life ==
Mackall married Harriet Gibson Bennett of Talbot County. She died in 1850. In 1854, he married Isabella Hollingsworth of Elkton. She died in 1893. He had one son, William H. Mackall was a member of the Trinity Protestant Episcopal Church and served as a member of the Episcopal convention. After moving back to Maryland, Mackall lived at Landing Farm on the Elk River.

Mackall died on February 16, 1902, at the home of his son in Elkton. He was buried at Elkton Cemetery.
