= Margaret J. Jackson =

American politician (died 2003)

Member of the Maryland Senate from the Cecil County district
- In office 1953 – January 1955
- Preceded by: Omar D. Crothers Jr.
- Succeeded by: James Weinroth

Personal details
- Born: Margaret E. Jefferson Chestertown, Maryland, U.S.
- Died: June 1, 2003 (aged 94) Towson, Maryland, U.S.
- Party: Democratic
- Spouse(s): Omar D. Crothers Jr. (m. 1939; died 1953) Carle A. Jackson (m. 1960; died 1995)
- Children: 1
- Education: Washington College
- Occupation: Politician
- Nickname: "Jeff"

Margaret Jefferson Jackson (died June 1, 2003), born Margaret E. Jefferson, was an American politician from Maryland. She was appointed to the Maryland Senate in 1953 following the death of her husband Omar D. Crothers Jr.

== Early life ==
Margaret E. Jefferson was born in Chestertown, Maryland, to Harry F. Jefferson. She graduated from Washington College in 1929. She then worked at a women's clothing store owned by her father. After her father's death, she ran the store until she got married in 1939.

== Career ==
She was a Democrat. She was appointed as a member of the Maryland Senate in 1953 following her husband Omar D. Crothers Jr.'s death. She served until the end of that term in January 1955. She was the second woman to serve in the Maryland Senate.

She was a chairwoman of the United Democratic Women's Club and served as president of the Democratic Women's Clubs of Cecil County. She was co-chairwoman of Curley Byrd's campaign for governor in 1954.

== Personal life ==
She married Omar D. Crothers Jr. in 1939 and moved to Walnut Lane in Elkton. They had one son, Omar D. III. Her husband died in 1953. She was known by the nickname "Jeff".

In 1960, she moved to Roland Park, Baltimore. She married Carle A. Jackson, son of Baltimore mayor Howard W. Jackson, on December 27, 1960. Her husband died in 1995.

She died on June 1, 2003, at the age of 94, at a retirement community in Towson.
