= John Carruthers (footballer) =

English footballer

Personal information
- Full name: John Clement Carruthers
- Date of birth: 1900
- Place of birth: Howdon-on-Tyne, England
- Date of death: 1959 (aged 58–59)
- Height: 5 ft 10 1/2 in (1.79 m)
- Position: Centre forward

Youth career
- Preston Colliery

Senior career*
Years	Team	Apps	(Gls)
1920	South Shields	2	(1)
1921–1922	Bradford City	4	(0)
1923	Blackpool	2	(0)
1923–1924	Crewe Alexandra	20	(4)
- Preston Colliery
- * Club domestic league appearances and goals

John Clement Carruthers (1900–1959) was an English professional footballer. A centre forward born in Howden-on-Tyne, he played in the Football League for South Shields, Bradford City, Blackpool and Crewe Alexandra, in between spells with Preston Colliery.
