= Whitney Crothers Dilley =

American academic

- Born: New York City, New York
- Occupations: Professor, author

Whitney Crothers Dilley (born in New York City) is an American professor of comparative literature and cinema studies. She is best known as the author of the 2007 monograph The Cinema of Ang Lee: The Other Side of the Screen, published by Wallflower Press, and distributed in the United States by Columbia University Press.

Dilley's Ang Lee book was listed as a bestseller on Amazon.com within a month of its publication, demonstrating growing scholarly interest in the films of Ang Lee, whose films Crouching Tiger, Hidden Dragon and Brokeback Mountain both became cultural milestones in the American media.

In addition, Dilley has been repeatedly honored (including both financial prizes and citations in Who's Who in the World, Who's Who of American Women, and others) for coediting the 2002 work Feminism/Femininity in Chinese Literature, the first book-length English-language application of feminist theory to Chinese literature. She presently lives and works in Taipei, Taiwan, as an associate professor in the Department of English at Shih Hsin University, Taiwan's most prestigious media/film school.

Dilley received her undergraduate education from both Oberlin College and Brown University. She completed her doctorate in Comparative Literature at the University of Washington in 1998.

== Bibliography ==
- The Cinema of Ang Lee: The Other Side of the Screen, Wallflower Press, 2007 (author), ISBN 978-1-905674-08-4 Paperback, ISBN 978-1-905674-09-1 Hardback
- Feminism/Femininity in Chinese Literature, Rodopi Press, 2002 (editor), ISBN 90-420-0717-6
- The Cinema of Wes Anderson: Bringing Nostalgia to Life, Wallflower Press, 2017 (author), ISBN 978-0231180696 Paperback, ISBN 978-0231180689 Hardback
