= Blue Ball Village, Maryland =

Unincorporated community in Maryland, United States

- Unincorporated community
- Location within the State of Maryland Blue Ball Village (the United States)
- Coordinates: 39°42′00″N 75°56′13″W
- Country: United States
- State: Maryland
- County: Cecil

Government
- Elevation: 367 ft (112 m)
- Time zone: UTC-5 (Eastern (EST))
  - Summer (DST): UTC-4 (EDT)
- GNIS feature ID: 589091

Blue Ball Village is an unincorporated community in Cecil County, Maryland, United States.

Andrew Job, a Quaker settler, operated the Blue Ball Inn starting in 1710 at a crossroads in the area. The former village of Blue Ball is no more, but Blue Ball Road retains the name.

The settlement is located 7 mi (11 km) east of Rising Sun along Maryland Route 273.
