= John H. Jenness =

American politician and physician (1862–1915)

Member of the Maryland House of Delegates from the Cecil County district
- In office 1898–1898 Serving with Wilmer D. Thompson and John S. Wirt

Personal details
- Born: September 15, 1862 West Nottingham, Maryland, U.S.
- Died: March 29, 1915 (aged 52) Rising Sun, Maryland, U.S.
- Resting place: West Nottingham Cemetery
- Party: Democratic
- Spouse: M. Bessie Marshall (m. 1903)
- Children: 1
- Education: St. John's College; University of Maryland, Baltimore
- Occupation: Politician; physician; educator

John H. Jenness (September 15, 1862 – March 29, 1915) was an American politician and physician from Maryland. He served as a member of the Maryland House of Delegates, representing Cecil County in 1898.

== Early life ==
John H. Jenness was born on September 15, 1862, in West Nottingham, Maryland, to Louisa and Samuel J. Jenness. He was educated at West Nottingham Academy and St. John's College. He graduated with a medical degree from the University of Maryland, Baltimore.

== Career ==
Around 1888, Jenness started a medical practice in Rising Sun. Jenness also worked as a teacher in Cecil County schools. He worked as an assistant to Governor Austin Lane Crothers at Oakwood School.

Jenness was a Democrat. He was a member of the Maryland House of Delegates, representing Cecil County, in 1898. In 1902, he was appointed as school commissioner of Cecil County by Governor John Walter Smith and was later re-appointed by Governor Crothers in 1908 and Governor Phillips Lee Goldsborough in 1914. He remained in that role until his death.

== Personal life ==
Jenness married M. Bessie Marshall, daughter of William Marshall of Philadelphia, on May 6, 1903. They had one son, Richard H. He was friends with Governor Crothers.

Jenness died following a pneumonia illness on March 29, 1915, at his home in Rising Sun. He was buried at West Nottingham Cemetery.
