= Samuel Crothers =

Presbyterian minister & abolitionist

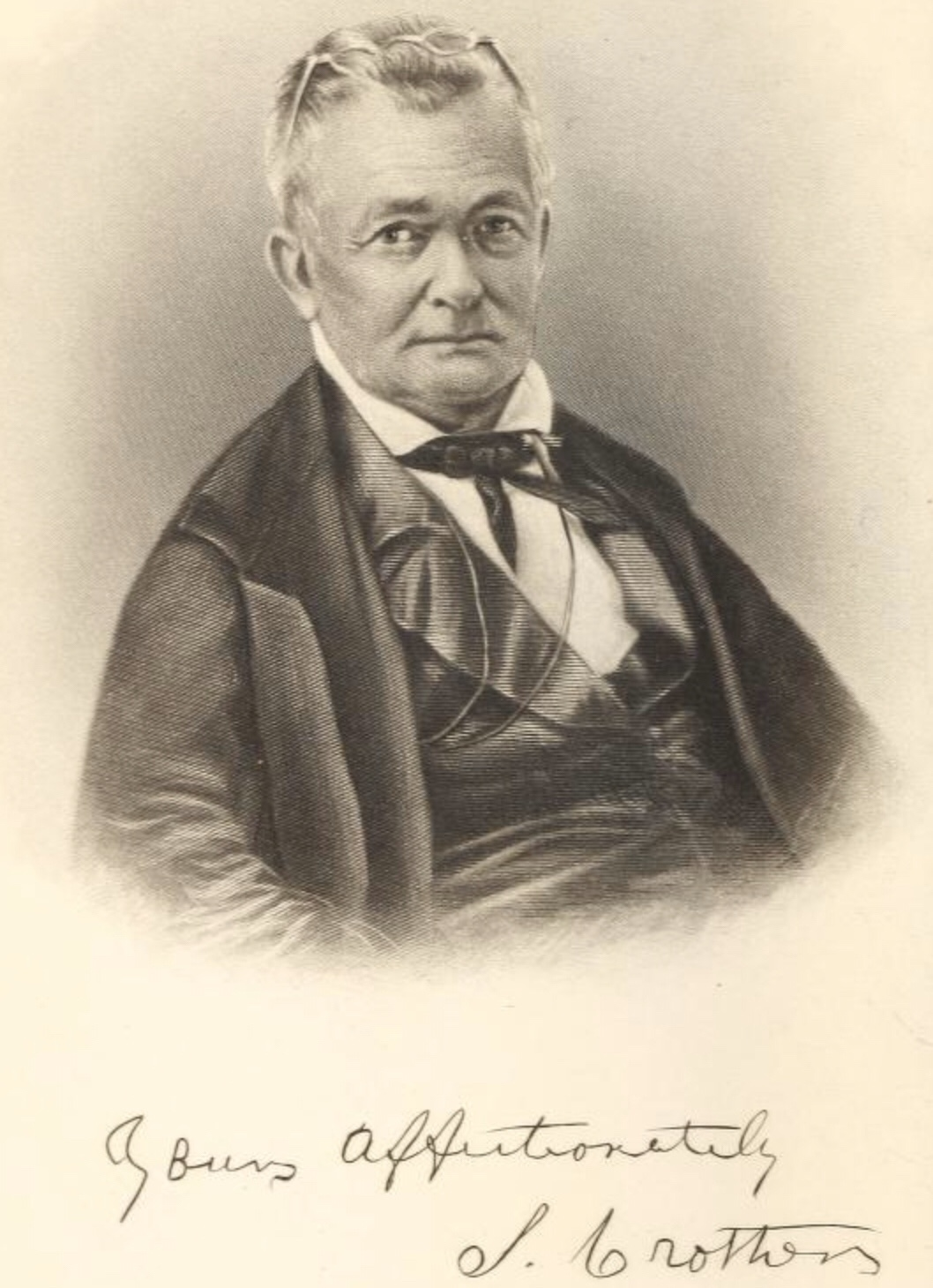
- Church: Presbyterianism

Personal details
- Born: October 22, 1783 Franklin County, Pennsylvania, U.S.
- Died: July 20, 1855 (aged 71)
- Occupation: Minister, writer, antislavery advocate

Samuel Crothers (October 22, 1783 – July 20, 1855) was a Presbyterian minister, writer, and outspoken antislavery advocate.

== Biography ==
Born in Franklin County, Pennsylvania, Samuel Crothers was raised in Kentucky from 1787 until 1804. In 1804 he moved to New York to attend the Presbyterian theological seminary under the charge of Dr. John M. Mason. In 1809, following his seminary training, Crothers was licensed to preach. He soon accepted a call to serve as pastor of both the Associate Reformed Church of Chillicothe, Ohio, and the Hop Run Church just southeast of Greenfield. This post lasted until 1813, when he devoted his time fully to the Hop Run Church. In 1818, Crothers joined the Presbyterian Church, returning to Greenfield 1820 to organize the Greenfield Presbyterian Church.

Crothers is notable for having spent much of his lifetime writing and speaking against those who had made a biblical case for slavery, especially in his articles published in the Quarterly Anti-slavery Magazine. Crothers, a well-respected theologian and debater, debated the issue with theological giants of the era including Charles Hodge. Noteworthy among Crothers' work are fifteen letters published in the Cincinnati Journal, an "Appeal to Patriots and Christians, in Behalf of Enslaved Africans." In addition, Crothers published several books, including The Gospel of the Jubilee and The Life of Abraham. Crothers coined the term 'bibliotherapy', referring to reading therapy, which is used in cognitive behavioral therapy.

== Publications ==
- Crothers, Samuel (1833). Strictures on African slavery. Abolition Society of Paint Valley, Ohio.
- Crothers, Samuel (1835). The gospel of the typical servitude : the substance of a sermon preached in Greenfield, Jan. 1, 1834. Abolition Society of Paint Valley.
- Samuel Crothers. "Slavery and the Biblical Repertory" in The Quarterly Anti-slavery Magazine. Vol II, April, 1837, No.3.
- Samuel Crothers. The Gospel of the Jubilee. IM Waters, 1837
- Crothers, Samuel (1847). The Life of Abraham, the first missionary, designed for youth in families, Sabbath schools, and Bible classes. Chillicothe, Ohio.
- Crothers, Samuel (1856). The gospel of the Jubilee. An explanation of the typical privileges secured to the congregation and pious strangers, by the atonement on the morning of the Jubilee.— Lev. xxv, 9–46. Introduction by John Rankin (abolitionist) (Re-print from the author's 1839 ed.). Cincinnati: American Reform Tract and Book Society.

== Bibliography ==
- Greenfield Ohio Historical Society. "Greenfield's Stand Against Slavery." Greenfield: Turner Publishing, 2000.
- Robert Christy Galbraith. The History of the Chillicothe Presbytery: From its Organization in 1799 to 1889. Harvard: H.W. Guthrie, Hugh Bell and Peter Platter, Committee on Publication, 1889
- J. W. Klise, A. E. Hough. The County of Highland: a History of Highland County, Ohio. New York: Northwestern Historical Association, 1902.
- Ritchie, Rev. Andrew (1857). The life and writings of Rev. Samuel Crothers, D.D., being extracts from his writings illustrative of his style, and of the patriarchal and mosaic economy; interwoven with a narrative of his life. Cincinnati: Moore, Wilstack, Keys & Co.
- James Grant Wilson, John Fiske. Appleton's Cyclopædia of American Biography, Volume 2. Princeton: D. Appleton and company,1887.
