= Samuel Ford (Maryland politician) =

American politician (1832–1900)

Member of the Maryland House of Delegates from the Cecil County district
- In office 1858–1858 Serving with James A. Davis and Milton Y. Kidd

Personal details
- Born: 1832
- Died: February 27, 1900 (aged 68) Washington, D.C., U.S.
- Resting place: Oak Hill Cemetery
- Party: Whig; Republican
- Spouse: Ella Stout
- Children: 2
- Occupation: Politician; brickmaker

Samuel Ford (1832 – February 27, 1900) was an American politician and brickmaker from Maryland. He served as a member of the Maryland House of Delegates, representing Cecil County in 1858.

== Early life ==
Samuel Ford was born in 1832 to John Ford. His father was a reverend in North East, Maryland.

== Career ==
Ford was a Whig and later became a Republican. He was elected as a Whig and served as a member of the Maryland House of Delegates, representing Cecil County in 1858.

During the start of the Civil War, Ford organized Company A of the 5th Maryland Regiment and served as its captain. The company served at conflicts including in Berlin, Maryland, at the Siege of Petersburg and the Battle of Antietam. After the war, Ford worked in a brick business and supplied brick for buildings in Washington, D.C., including the United States Capitol and the Bureau of Engraving and Printing.

== Personal life ==
Ford married Ella Stout, daughter of Joseph T. Stout. They had two sons, Herbert and Carroll. He was a member and steward of the Metropolitan Methodist Episcopal Church in Washington, D.C.

Ford died on February 27, 1900, at the age of 68, at his home in Washington, D.C. He was buried in Oak Hill Cemetery.
