= Charles C. Crothers =

American politician and lawyer (1857–1897)

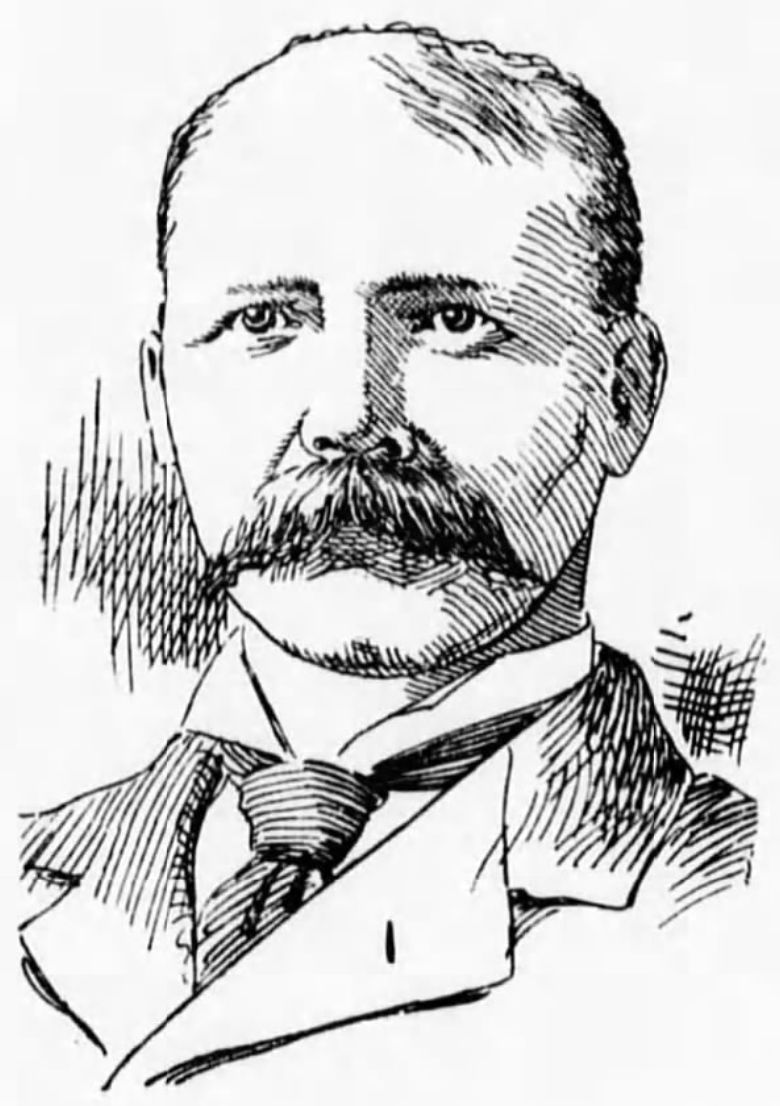
- Sketch of Crothers in 1897

Member of the Maryland Senate from the Cecil County district
- In office 1894–1896
- Preceded by: John S. Wirt
- Succeeded by: Austin L. Crothers

Personal details
- Born: Charles Carroll Crothers; March 28, 1857 Cecil County, Maryland, U.S.
- Died: September 28, 1897 (aged 40) Elkton, Maryland, U.S.
- Resting place: West Nottingham Cemetery; Colora, Maryland, U.S.
- Party: Democratic
- Relations: Austin Lane Crothers (brother); Omar D. Crothers (nephew); Omar D. Crothers Jr. (grand nephew)
- Occupation: Politician; lawyer

Charles Carroll Crothers (March 28, 1857 – September 28, 1897) was a politician and lawyer from Maryland. He served in the Maryland Senate from 1894 to 1896.

== Early life ==
Charles Carroll Crothers was born on March 28, 1857, near Conowingo in Cecil County, Maryland, to Margaret Orelia (née Porter) and Alpheus R. Crothers. His father was elected as justice of the peace and served as collector of taxes. His uncle was Richard H. Crothers, commissioner of Cecil County. Crothers attended public schools and graduated from West Nottingham Academy. At the age of sixteen, he taught in Warwick, Charlestown and Calvert. Crothers studied law privately and in the office of Hiram McCullough. He was admitted to the bar in Cecil County in 1878. His brother was Austin Lane Crothers and his nephew was Omar D. Crothers.

== Career ==
Crothers was a Democrat. Crothers was elected state's attorney of Cecil County in 1879. He served in this role for four years. In 1883, Crothers formed a law practice with Daniel Bratton. He continued his practice with Bratton until 1889.

In 1891, Crothers lost the Democratic nomination for the United States House of Representatives to J. Fred Talbott. In 1893, Crothers defeated John S. Wirt and was elected to the Maryland Senate. He served from 1894 to 1896. He was nominated for Attorney General of Maryland in 1895, but lost.

At the time of his death, Crothers and L. M. Haines were junior counsel for the Pennsylvania Railroad.

== Personal life ==
Crothers did not marry.

Crothers died on September 28, 1897, at his home on North Street in Elkton. He was buried at West Nottingham Cemetery in Colora, Maryland.
