= John Henry Carothers House =

Historic house in Tennessee, United States

- U.S. National Register of Historic Places
- Location within Tennessee Location within the United States
- Location: Liberty Pike, Franklin, Tennessee
- Coordinates: 35°55′43.6″N 86°49′6.8″W
- Area: 26 acres (11 ha)
- Built: 1937
- Architect: John Henry Carothers
- MPS: Williamson County MRA
- NRHP reference No.: 89002028
- Added to NRHP: November 27, 1989

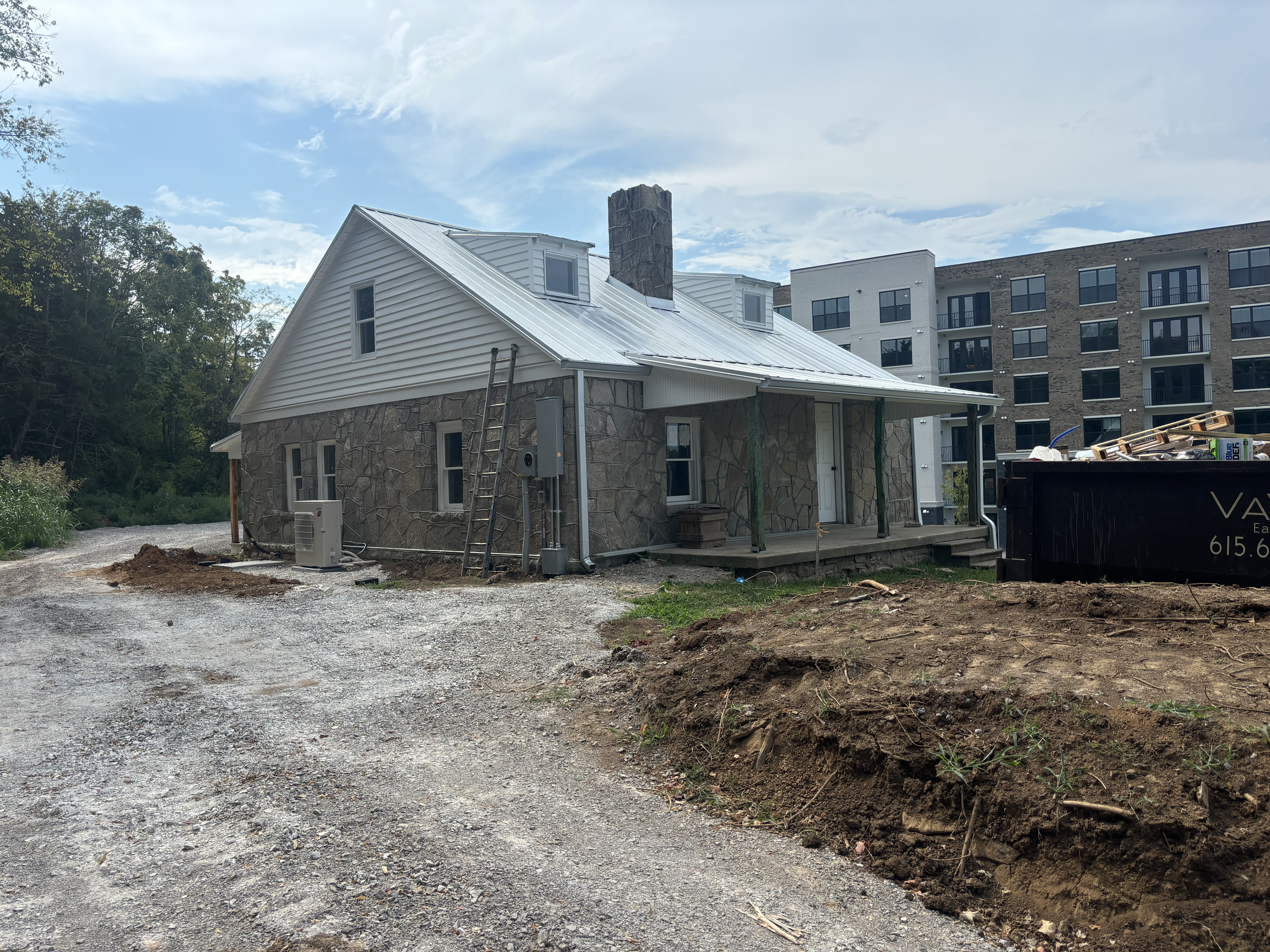

The John Henry Carothers House, also known as Ezeal Carothers House, is a property in Franklin, Tennessee that was listed on the National Register of Historic Places in 1989. When listed the property included four contributing buildings, two contributing structures, and two non-contributing buildings, on an area of 26 acres (11 ha). The house is a one-and-a-half-story limestone farmhouse constructed by John Henry Carothers in 1937 with help from his son, Ezeal Carothers, following a house plan that was purchased. The men quarrired the limestone from the property.

The property was covered in a 1988 study of Williamson County historical resources.
