= Thomas Caruthers =

American politician

Thomas Caruthers (c. 1818–1867), also spelled as Thomas Carothers, was an American politician who served in the Texas House of Representatives for the counties of Grimes, Montgomery and Walker, for the period 1847–1849. His committee assignments were Claims and Accounts, County Boundaries, Jury Fund and Post Routes

Born in Pennsylvania, his parents were Tom and Elizabeth. His income was derived from his business of cattle and farming. Prior to serving in the state legislature, he was a local justice of the peace. During the Civil War, Caruthers was in charge of the Huntsville state prison. He was a cousin to Sam Houston and named as one of the executors responsible for compiling the inventory of Houston's estate.

Texas House of Representatives
| Preceded by Unknown | Member of the Texas House of Representatives from District Grimes, Montgomery, Walker; 1847–1849 | Succeeded by Unknown |
