= Omar D. Crothers =

American politician and lawyer (died 1946)

Member of the Maryland Senate from the Cecil County district
- In office 1918–1922
- Preceded by: Frank E. Williams
- Succeeded by: Harry A. Cantwell
- In office 1910–1914
- Preceded by: Joseph I. France
- Succeeded by: Frank E. Williams

Personal details
- Died: August 3, 1946 (aged 66) Elkton, Maryland, U.S.
- Resting place: West Nottingham Cemetery; Colora, Maryland, U.S.
- Party: Democratic
- Spouse: Reba Miller
- Children: 2, including Omar D. Jr.
- Relatives: Austin L. Crothers (uncle); Charles C. Crothers (uncle)
- Education: Delaware College
- Occupation: Politician; lawyer

Omar D. Crothers (died August 3, 1946) was an American politician and lawyer from Maryland. He served as a member of the Maryland Senate, representing Cecil County from 1910 to 1914 and from 1918 to 1922.

== Early life ==
Omar D. Crothers was born to Alpheus R. Crothers. Governor Austin L. Crothers and Charles C. Crothers were his uncles. Both uncles raised him after his father died in 1902. Crothers attended West Nottingham Academy and graduated from Delaware College. He was admitted to the bar in 1901.

== Career ==
Crothers was a lawyer. He was a member of the Maryland Senate, representing Cecil County, from 1910 to 1914 and from 1918 to 1922. He served fourteen years on the State Accidents Commission. He also served on the State Roads Commission.

== Personal life ==
Crothers married Reba Miller of Elkton, daughter of Samuel Miller. They had two sons, Omar D. Jr. and Austin L. Crothers bought a home on East Main Street in Elkton in 1911.

Crothers died of a heart attack on August 3, 1946, at the age of 66, at his law office in Elkton. He was buried at West Nottingham Cemetery in Colora.
