= John S. Wirt =

American politician and lawyer (1851–1904)

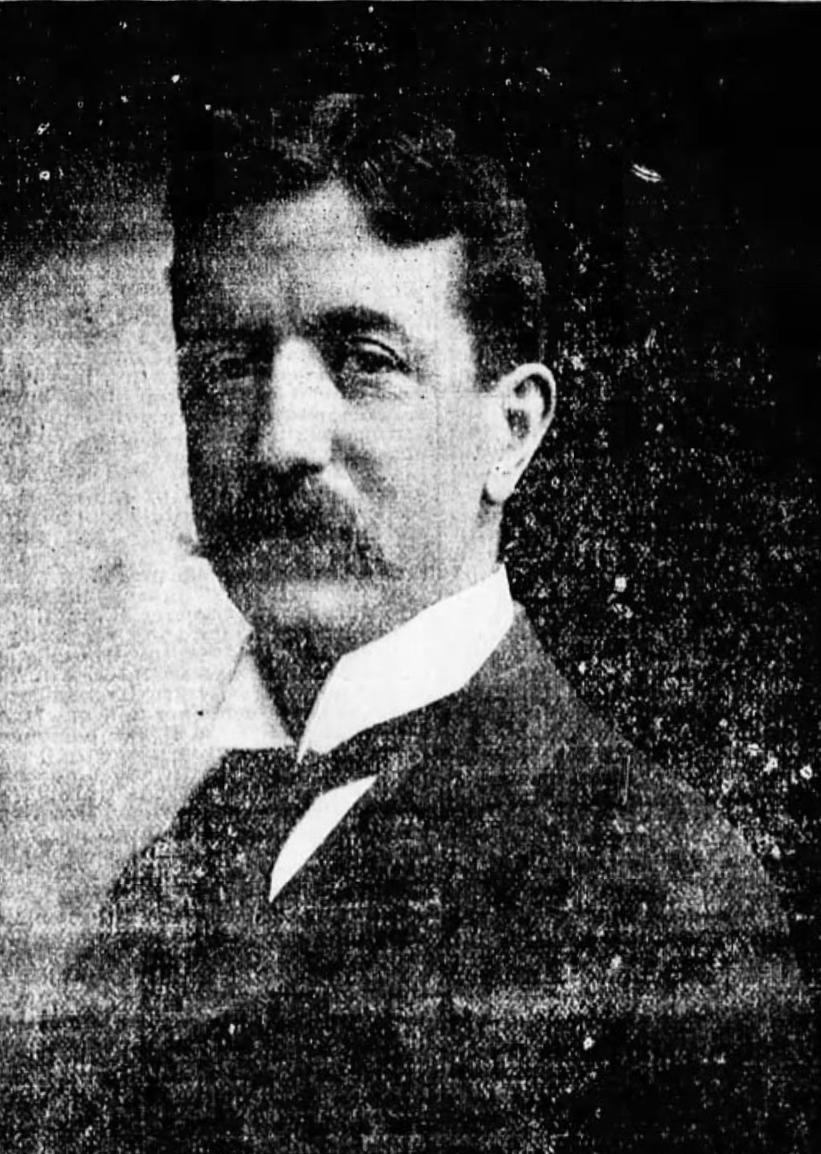
- Wirt in 1904 newspaper

Member of the Maryland House of Delegates from the Cecil County district
- In office 1898–1898 Serving with John H. Jenness and Wilmer D. Thompson

Member of the Maryland Senate
- In office 1890–1894
- Preceded by: Clinton McCullough
- Succeeded by: Charles C. Crothers

Personal details
- Born: John Sluyter Wirt; November 16, 1851 Bohemia Manor (now Chesapeake City, Maryland), U.S.
- Died: May 17, 1904 (aged 52) Elkton, Maryland, U.S.
- Resting place: Elkton Cemetery; Elton, Maryland, U.S.
- Party: Democratic
- Spouse: Anne Rebecca Pearce (m. 1886)
- Education: St. John's College (AB, MA); University of Maryland School of Law
- Occupation: Politician; lawyer

John Sluyter Wirt (November 16, 1851 – May 17, 1904) was an American politician and lawyer from Maryland. He served in the Maryland Senate from 1890 to 1894 and the Maryland House of Delegates in 1898.

== Early life ==
John Sluyter Wirt was born on November 16, 1851, at Bohemia Manor (now Chesapeake City, Maryland), to Margaret Savin (née Biddle) and John W. Wirt. His father was educated as a physician but worked as a farmer. Wirt moved at a young age with his family to a house on Bridge Street in Elkton, Maryland. His father died when Wirt was four years old. Wirt attended Elkton Academy and was tutored by his stepbrother W. B. Mitchell. He graduated with a Bachelor of Arts from St. John's College in Annapolis, Maryland in 1872. In 1874, Wirt graduated from the University of Maryland School of Law. In 1882, Wirt was conferred with a Master of Arts from St. John's College.

== Career ==
Wirt started practicing law in Baltimore with partner General L. Allison Wilmer. In 1878, Wirt moved to Chicago, Illinois, to accept a position with the firm Judd & Whitehouse, but returned to Elkton after the death of his brother Henry Biddle Wirt in 1881. He then continued his brother's law practice with George W. Cruikshank. Since 1882, the law firm served as counsel for a number of companies, including the Baltimore and Ohio Railroad, Whitaker Iron Company, Scott Fertilizer Company, Fidelity and Deposit Company of Maryland, Rowland Manufacturing Company and the Port Deposit Water Company. The law firm would later dissolve and Wirt would remain the counselor for the Baltimore and Ohio Railroad. Wirt was connected with the Baltimore Bulletin. With Frederic Emory, he also started The State, a weekly periodical. He later ran and edited the Cecil Democrat.

Wirt was a Democrat. In 1884, Wirt served as a delegate to the 1884 Democratic National Convention. In 1892, he was delegate-at-large at the 1892 Democratic National Convention. He supported Grover Cleveland for president in both conventions. In 1889, Wirt was elected to the Maryland Senate. He served from 1890 to 1894. He supported the Australian ballot system. In 1893, Wirt was defeated for renomination to the state senate by Charles C. Crothers. In 1892, Wirt was a candidate for the United States Senate, but withdrew from the ballot in support of Charles Hopper Gibson. In 1897, Wirt was elected to the Maryland House of Delegates, representing Cecil County. He served in 1898.

Wirt served as vice president of the Civil Service Reform Association of Maryland and vice president of the Maryland State Bar Association. He served as a trustee of St. John's College starting in 1884.

== Personal life ==
Wirt married Anne Rebecca Pearce on April 28, 1886. Wirt was an Episcopalian.

Wirt lived at East Main Street in Elkton. Wirt died of uremia on May 17, 1904, at his home in Elkton. He was buried at the family lot in Elkton Cemetery.
