= West Nottingham Academy =

Private school in Maryland, United States

Location
- 1079 Firetower Road; Colora, Maryland 21917-1502; United States

Information
- Type: Private Boarding School
- Motto: Nihil Sine Labore (Nothing Without Effort)
- Established: 1744; 282 years ago
- President: John Guffey
- Head of school: John Guffey.
- Grades: 9–12
- Gender: Co-Ed
- Enrollment: approx. 130
- Team name: Rams
- Accreditation: Association of Independent Maryland and DC Schools, National Association of Independent Schools, Maryland Association for Environmental & Outdoor Education
- Newspaper: The Arrow
- Yearbook: The Pegé
- Tuition: $19,949 day, $51,200 five day boarding, $64,075 boarding, $74,075 international boarding (2024-25)
- Website: School website
- West Nottingham Academy Historic District
- U.S. National Register of Historic Places
- U.S. Historic district
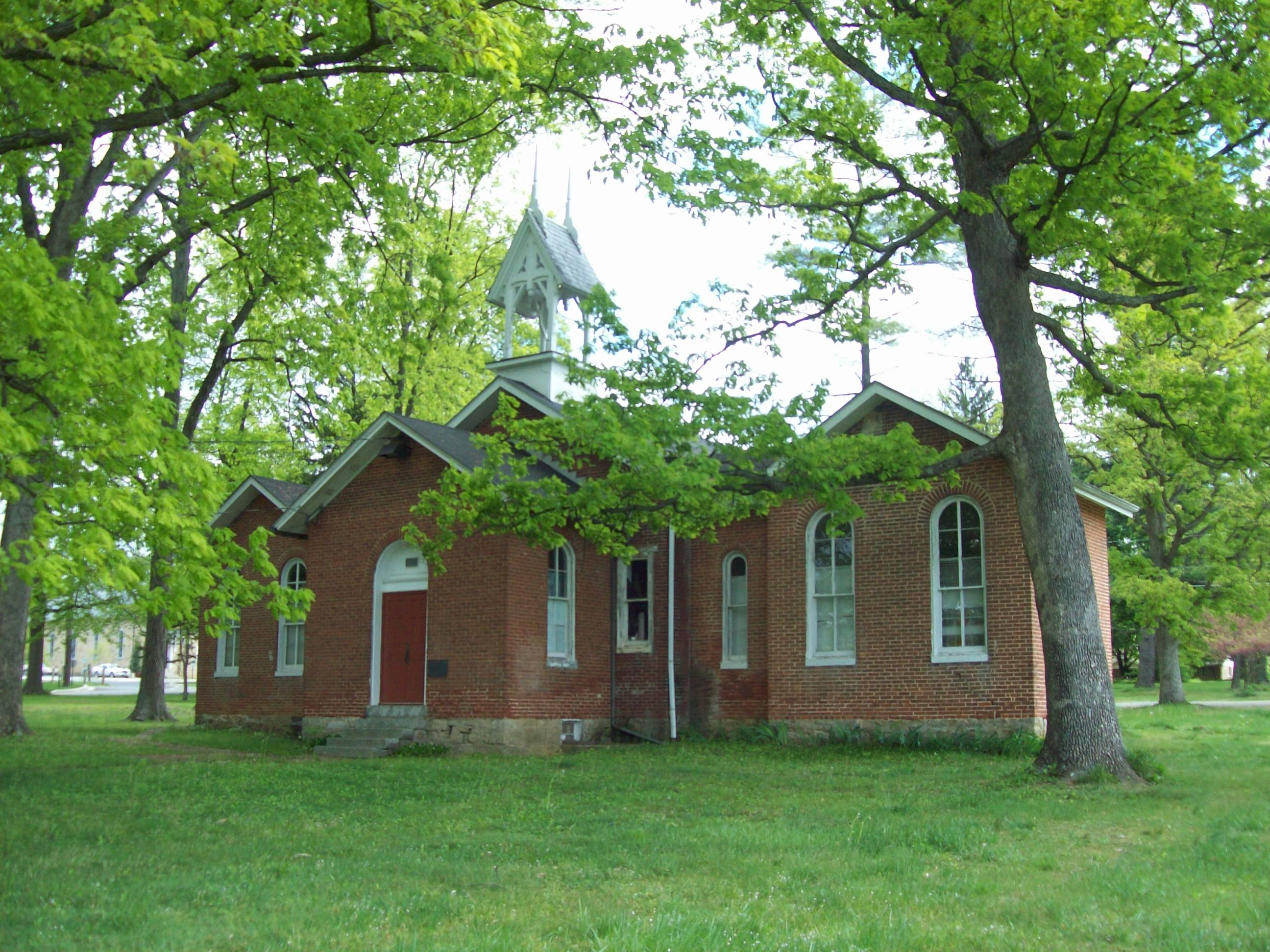
- West Nottingham Academy Historic District, April 2010

- Location within Maryland Location within the United States
- Nearest city: Colora, Maryland
- Coordinates: 39°40′1″N 76°4′49″W
- Area: 85 acres (34 ha)
- Built: 1864
- Architectural style: Colonial Revival, Mid 19th Century Revival, Federal
- NRHP reference No.: 90001125
- Added to NRHP: July 26, 1990

West Nottingham Academy is an independent co-ed school serves both boarding and day students in grades 9-12. It was founded in 1744 by the Presbyterian preacher Samuel Finley, who later became President of The College of New Jersey, which is now Princeton University. The 124-acre (0.50 km^{2}), tree-lined campus is in Colora, Maryland near the Chesapeake Bay, an hour south of Philadelphia and 45 minutes north of Baltimore.

The school claims to be "the oldest boarding school in the United States" and has the oldest founding date of any school still in operation.

== Academics ==
West Nottingham offers a college preparatory program. Classes are offered in the arts, humanities, foreign languages, mathematics and sciences. The academic program also offers an English as Second-Language (ESL) program for international students (25% of WNA's students come from outside the US, including Japan, Australia, South Korea, Barbados, Russia, Brazil, Nigeria, Spain and China).

== History ==
West Nottingham's early graduates include many of the most prominent colonial Americans. In 1744, an Irish Presbyterian preacher Samuel Finley was called to take charge of the newly formed congregation on the lower branch of the Octoraro Creek, a short distance south of what was soon to become the Mason–Dixon line. The congregation lived on the broad, rolling land known as the Nottingham Lots.

Finley, in later years became president of the College of New Jersey (Princeton University), was a teacher as well as a preacher. Finley held that to be an intelligent Christian one needed to use the mind God provided, and that one's mind could reach full effectiveness only through training. The task of the church, for Finley, was to administer the sacraments and comfort the sick, to baptize the infants and consecrate marriage, to bury the dead and preach the Word of God. But the task of the church was also to teach men and women to think by exposing them to the great thoughts of the ages in order to produce rational beings capable of creative action in a new and swiftly changing world.

Finley opened the school in 1744. It was a crude log structure at the rear of his own home, located near the present site of the Rising Sun Middle School. The log building on the present campus was built as a replica of the original school building from descriptions in old records and students’ memoirs.

Within a few years, church and Academy were moved to their present location. A two-story building was erected to house the school activities at the site of what is now the sunken garden at Gayley. When it burned, a single-story building replaced it, only to be destroyed some years later by storm. In 1865 the red brick J. Paul Slaybaugh Old Academy was erected and stands to this day.

The Academy was the first of the Presbyterian preparatory boarding schools and the forerunner of some 1,600 similar academies in the country. As public education became the norm, the Presbyterian Church allowed most of its secondary schools to close or converted them to colleges. The school's students included two Founding Fathers among other notable alumni.

The Chesapeake Learning Center was founded in the 2000s and with a focus on international students, there was the creation of the English as a Second Language curriculum. A middle school was started but was closed in 2006, completing its last year in 2009.

Many new facilities were constructed, including the C. Herbert Foutz Student Center (1989), the East and West Dormitories (1998), and the Patricia A. Bathon Science Center (2003), or renovated including Magraw Hall (2000), and Finley Hall (2002). Summer 2007 saw the complete renovation of Rush Dormitory, renamed Rush House, and the construction of Durigg Plaza, an outdoor amphitheater/meeting space for the campus community. Renovation of Rowland dormitory was completed in the summer of 2008.

In June 2023 the school filed in federal court for Chapter 11 bankruptcy to reorganize its finances, listing $7.2 million in claims against it and $2.2 million in assets. In 2025 the school acquired by an existing donor, the Casa Laxmi Foundation leaseed back for $1 a year who have been focused on rebuilding new programs and new leadership. That same year, Founding Fathers descendant and alum Blake Van Leer helped introduce new Holographic and Drone technology programs.

== Historic district ==
West Nottingham Academy Historic District is a national historic district at Colora, Cecil County, Maryland, United States. It comprises approximately 85 acres (340,000 m^{2}), is characterized by a park-like setting of mature trees, a narrow stream, a small lake, and 19th and 20th century buildings. The principal historic buildings include the Old Academy or Canteen, constructed 1864, a single-story, three-part Victorian brick building with a distinctive stick-decorated belfry; the Gayley House, constructed about 1830, a prominent 2 1/2-story brick dwelling; and Magraw Hall, constructed 1929, a large gambrel-roofed stone administration building. Also on the property are Wiley House (about 1840), Becktel House (about 1900), Hilltop House (about 1900), the barn or old gym (about 1930) which burned down in February 1993, as well as the stone entrance and stone bridges. Founded in 1744, the West Nottingham Academy is the oldest operating boarding school in Maryland.

The historic core of the Academy were listed on the National Register of Historic Places in 1990 as the West Nottingham Academy Historic District.

== Athletics and activities ==
The school has sports teams including:

Soccer, Prep and Varsity Basketball, Lacrosse, Wrestling (boys and girls), Baseball, Cross Country, Volleyball, VEX Robotics, Tennis, Chess, Yoga, Martial Arts, and Physical Education.

Additional afternoon activities include Yearbook, Theatre, Photography, Green Rams Environmental Club and the school newspaper, The Arrow. As part of WNA's commitment to lifelong fitness and activity all students are asked to participate in a sport or club throughout the school year, one per trimester.

== Notable alumni ==
- John Archer - early Maryland politician
- Harry Anderson (baseball) - former Major League Baseball Player
- Josh Boone - former NBA basketball player
- Howard Bryant, Maryland state delegate and law professor
- Ross Cameron - President of Charms Candy Company and inventor of the Charms Blow Pop
- Austin Lane Crothers - Maryland governor, 1908–1912
- John Filson - author, founder of Cincinnati
- Eric Fischl - artist and sculptor
- John H. Jenness (1862–1915), physician and member of the Maryland House of Delegates
- Michael Johnson - 2012 Winter Youth Olympian. (Pairs Figure Skating)
- Ebenezer Hazard - United States Postmaster General from 1782 to 1789
- Peter H. Kostmayer - former US Congressman from Pennsylvania
- Richard D. Mackie (1922–2013) – member of the Maryland House of Delegates
- Alexander Martin - early governor of North Carolina
- Yves Missi - NBA player
- John Morgan - co-founder of the University of Pennsylvania Medical School
- John A. Reynolds (1820–1889), member of the Pennsylvania House of Representatives
- Benjamin Rush - Father of American psychiatry, signer of the Declaration of Independence
- William Shippen Jr. - co-founder of the University of Pennsylvania Medical School
- Richard Stockton - signer of the Declaration of Independence
- Blake Van Leer III - film producer, investor, entrepreneur civil rights advocate and celebrity advisor
