= Omar D. Crothers Jr. =

American politician and lawyer (1909–1953)

Member of the Maryland Senate from the Cecil County district
- In office 1951 – October 20, 1953
- Preceded by: Guy Johnson
- Succeeded by: Margaret J. Jackson

Personal details
- Born: March 7, 1909 Elkton, Maryland, U.S.
- Died: October 20, 1953 (aged 44) Elkton, Maryland, U.S.
- Resting place: Gilpin Manor Memorial Cemetery
- Party: Democratic
- Spouse: Margaret E. Jefferson (m. 1939)
- Children: 1
- Parent: Omar D. Crothers (father)
- Relatives: Austin Lane Crothers (great uncle)
- Education: University of Maryland; University of Maryland School of Law
- Occupation: Politician; lawyer

Omar D. Crothers Jr. (March 7, 1909 – October 20, 1953) was an American politician and lawyer from Maryland. He served as a member of the Maryland Senate, representing Cecil County from 1951 to his death in 1953.

== Early life ==
Omar D. Crothers Jr. was born on March 7, 1909, in Elkton, Maryland, to Reba (née Miller) and Omar D. Crothers. His father was a lawyer and state senator of Maryland. His great uncle was Maryland governor Austin Lane Crothers.

Crothers graduated from the Tome School. Crothers graduated from the University of Maryland with a bachelor's degree. He also graduated from the University of Maryland School of Law. He was a member of the lacrosse and football teams. In 1929, The Baltimore Sun selected Crothers as an all-state football guard. He was admitted to the bar in 1933.

== Career ==
Crothers practiced law in Baltimore following his graduation for a few years. He then returned to Elkton and started a law office there.

Crothers joined the United States Marine Corps during the World War II. He served in the Pacific and left service as a major in 1946. In August 1946, Crothers was appointed by Governor Herbert O'Conor as chairman of the state board of correction. He held that post until May 1947.

Crothers was a Democrat. Crothers served as a member of the Maryland Senate from 1951 to his death in 1953. He served as chairman of the judicial proceedings committee. He also served as chairman of the committee that worked two years on the recodification of Maryland's election laws.

Crothers worked as a lacrosse coach and assistant football coach at Washington College.

== Personal life ==
Crothers married Margaret E. Jackson in 1939. They had one son, Omar D. III. Crothers was personal and political friends with Curley Byrd, his college football coach. His friends would call him "Gus".

In the summer of 1953, Crothers received six weeks of treatment at Johns Hopkins Hospital for a heart condition. Crothers died on October 20, 1953, at Union Hospital in Elkton. He was buried at Gilpin Manor Memorial Cemetery.
