= Frank H. Mackie =

American politician and veterinarian (died 1939)

Member of the Maryland House of Delegates from the Cecil County district
- In office 1900–1901 Serving with Samuel J. Keys and John H. Kimble
- In office 1894–1896 Serving with Richard L. Thomas Jr. and George S. Woolley

Personal details
- Born: Cecil County, Maryland, U.S.
- Died: May 18, 1939 near North East, Maryland, U.S.
- Resting place: Sharp's Cemetery
- Party: Democratic
- Spouse: Emma O'Connell (m. 1902)
- Children: 2
- Education: University of Pennsylvania
- Occupation: Politician; veterinarian

Frank H. Mackie (died May 18, 1939) was an American politician and veterinarian from Maryland. He served as a member of the Maryland House of Delegates, representing Cecil County from 1894 to 1896 and from 1900 to 1901.

== Early life ==
Frank H. Mackie was born on a farm near Fair Hill in Cecil County, Maryland, His father was J. Alfred Mackie, who was one of the largest landowners in upper Cecil County. Mackie attended Cecil County schools and graduated from the University of Pennsylvania.

== Career ==
Mackie worked as a veterinarian. He practiced his profession in Cecil County until 1899 and then moved to Baltimore. In 1908, Governor Austin Lane Crothers appointed Mackie as state veterinarian. He served in that role for four years. In 1917, Mackie joined the United States Army as a captain. He retired after World War I and returned to Cecil County.

Mackie was a Democrat. He was a member of the Maryland House of Delegates, representing Cecil County, from 1894 to 1896 and from 1900 to 1901. Mackie ran for the Democratic nomination for the Maryland Senate in 1930, but lost to Cecil Clyde Squier.

== Personal life ==
Mackie married Emma O'Connell of Wilmington, Delaware, on November 26, 1902. He had one son and one daughter, Frank H. Jr. and Lavinia.

Mackie died on May 18, 1939, at the age of 74 or 75, at his "Turkey Point" farm, near North East. He was buried at Sharp's Cemetery.
