= Austin Lane Crothers =

American politician (1860-1912)

Austin L. Crothers
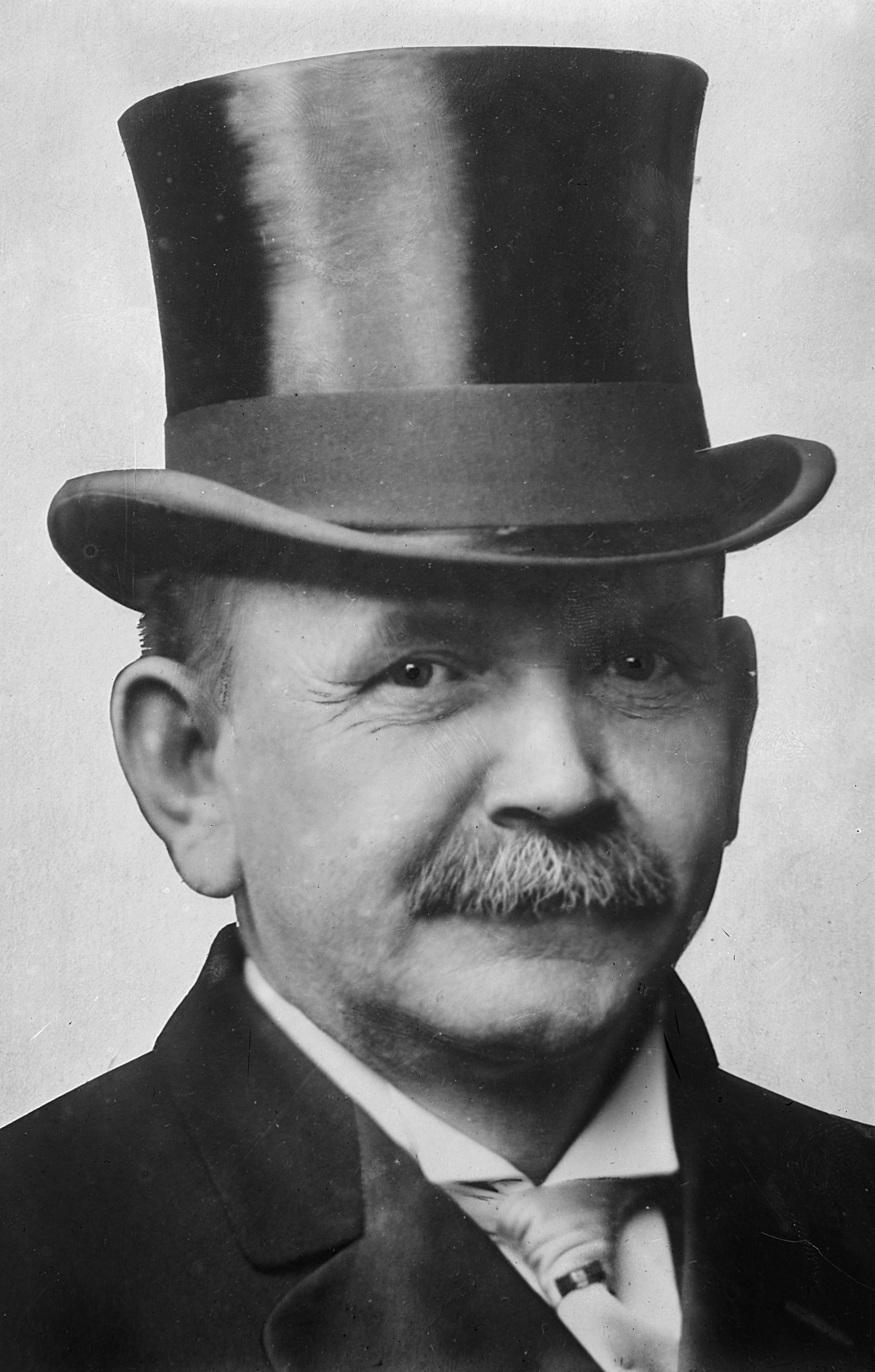

46th Governor of Maryland
- In office January 8, 1908 – January 10, 1912
- Preceded by: Edwin Warfield
- Succeeded by: Phillips L. Goldsborough

Member of the Maryland Senate
- In office 1900–1902
- Preceded by: Charles C. Crothers
- Succeeded by: Henry M. McCullough

Member of the Maryland House of Delegates
- In office 1897–1900

Personal details
- Born: May 17, 1860 Conowingo, Maryland, U.S.
- Died: May 25, 1912 (aged 52) Elkton, Maryland, U.S.
- Resting place: West Nottingham Cemetery
- Party: Democratic
- Relations: Charles C. Crothers (brother); Omar D. Crothers (nephew); Omar D. Crothers Jr. (grand nephew)

Austin Lane Crothers (May 17, 1860 – May 25, 1912) was an American politician and a member of the United States Democratic Party. He was the 46th governor of Maryland in the United States from 1908 to 1912.

== Early life and career ==
Crothers was born on May 17, 1860, near Conowingo in Cecil County, Maryland, the eighth son of Margaret Aurelia (née Porter) and Alpheus Crothers. He was raised on his father's farm, spending much of his life there. Educated at West Nottingham Academy, he spent several years in the work force, first as a store clerk, then as a public school teacher. He was inspired to become a lawyer, and graduated from the University of Maryland Law School in 1890. He practiced law in Elkton until becoming the State's Attorney for Cecil County, a post he held from 1891 to 1895.

In 1897, Austin Crothers was elected to the Maryland State Senate as a Democrat, replacing his brother Charles C. Crothers. During the session of 1900, he became his party's leader in the Senate after becoming chairman of the Senate Finance Committee. He was re-nominated for the 1901 election, but was defeated by the Republican Henry M. McCullough. Crothers continued to act as party leader in Cecil County, but still failed another re-election attempt in 1905.

In 1906, Governor Edwin Warfield appointed Crothers to succeed the late Judge Edwin H. Brown as an associate judge for the Second Judicial Circuit, which included Cecil County. However, he refused to run for a second term, and instead ran for governor in 1907. Despite being a relative unknown, Crothers was elected into office.

== Governor of Maryland ==
Crothers' tenure as governor was notable for its reform aspects. He created the State Roads Commission in 1908 to improve Maryland's road system; he pushed through a Corrupt Practices Act to create more accountability for campaign funds; and he supported the direct election of U.S. Senators (though that actually passed into law after his term). Crothers also pushed for the creation of the Public Service Commission and the State Bank Commissioner. He supported pure food laws, better care for the mentally ill, and increased taxes for collateral inheritance and automobile licenses. A number of reforms designed at helping workers were also carried out.

He tried to reform the Baltimore Board of Police Commissioners, initiating an extensive investigation that led to charges against them. Crothers removed the three supposedly corrupt members and tried to fill their posts with chosen replacements while the originals awaited trial. However, the Maryland Court of Appeals determined that the governor did not have such power, neither to remove them or replace them before their time in court. Crothers still tried to bring the charges against them, but nothing came of it.

Crothers also supported the 1910 Digges Amendment to the Maryland Constitution, which would have used property qualifications to disenfranchise African Americans. He also barely refrained (following a public outcry) from supporting a bill which would have effectively passed the bill's requirements into law even before the people ratified it. The Amendment was rejected by the people of Maryland.

Crothers's actions led to some problems with Maryland's other politicians, including members of his own party, near the end of his time as governor. Crothers was sick when he left office in 1912, and eventually died at the home of his nephew, Omar D. Crothers, in Elkton on May 25 of that year. He was buried at West Nottingham Cemetery.

Party political offices
Preceded by Edwin Warfield	Democratic nominee for Governor of Maryland; 1907	Succeeded by Arthur Pue Gorman Jr.
Political offices
Preceded by Edwin Warfield	Governor of Maryland; 1908–1912	Succeeded by Phillips L. Goldsborough
