= Albert Constable (1838–1904) =

American politician (1838–1904)

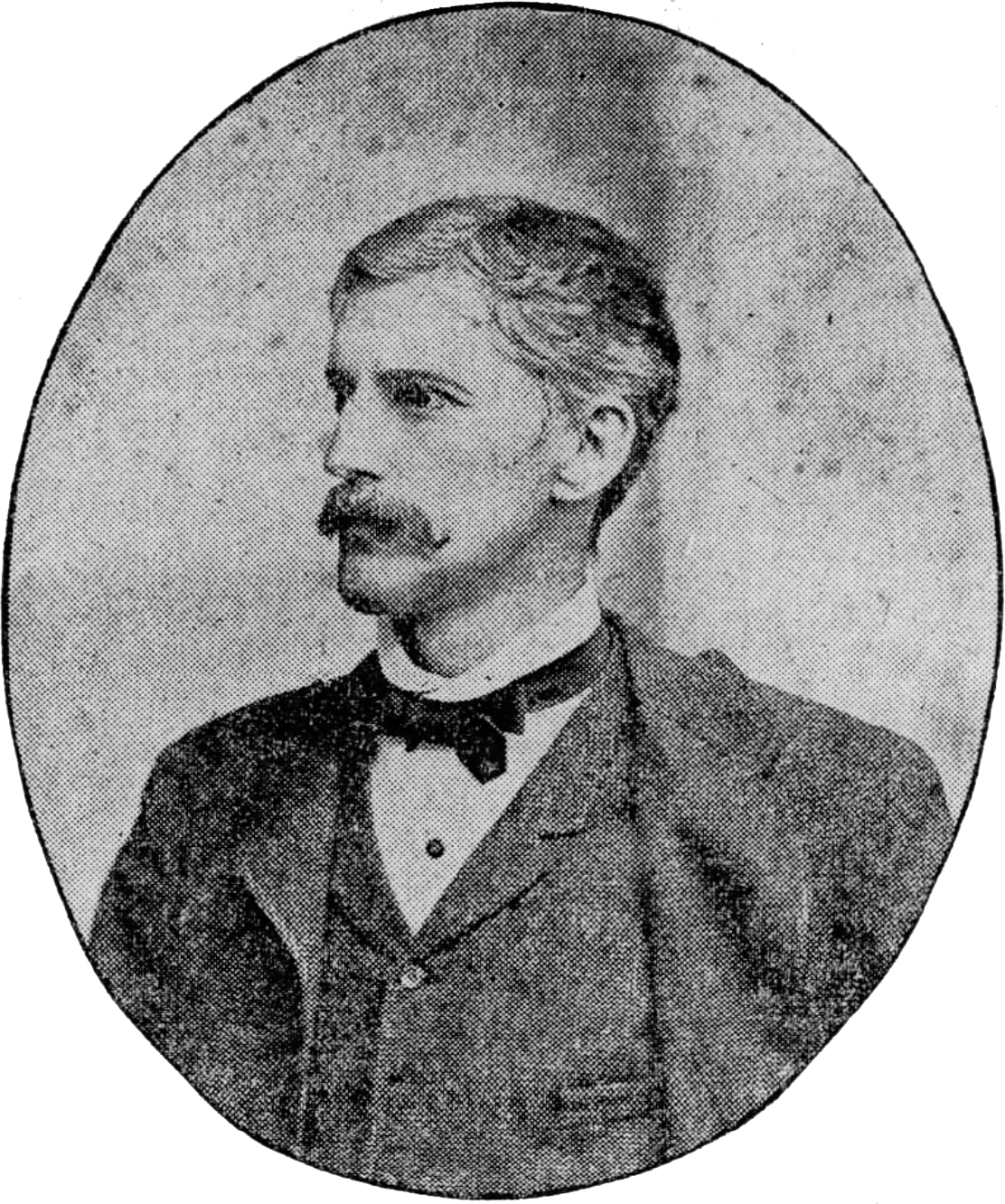
- Constable in a 1905 newspaper

Member of the Maryland House of Delegates from the Cecil County district
- In office 1876–1876 Serving with Alexander H. Briscoe and William Ward
- Preceded by: James A. Davis, James Black Groome, James A. Mackey, James Turner
- Succeeded by: William M. Knight, James M. Touchstone, James Turner

Personal details
- Born: October 24, 1838 Baltimore, Maryland, U.S.
- Died: August 22, 1904 (aged 65) Baltimore, Maryland, U.S.
- Cause of death: Murder by gunshot
- Resting place: Elkton Presbyterian Cemetery
- Party: Democratic
- Spouse: Elizabeth Black Groome (m. 1866)
- Children: 9
- Parent: Albert Constable (father)
- Relatives: Henry W. Archer (uncle)
- Education: Harvard Law School
- Alma mater: Delaware College
- Occupation: Politician; lawyer

Albert Constable (October 24, 1838 – August 22, 1904) was an American politician from Maryland. He served as a member of the Maryland House of Delegates, representing Cecil County in 1876. He was robbed and shot in Elkton in August 1904, dying a few days after in a hospital in Baltimore.

== Early life ==
Albert Constable was born on October 24, 1838, in Baltimore to Hannah (née Archer) and Albert Constable. His father was a circuit court judge and served in the U.S. House of Representatives. He attended school in Norwich and New London, Connecticut, as well as in Newark, Delaware. He graduated from Delaware College. He attended Harvard Law School for one year and then continued his law studies under his uncle Henry W. Archer.

== Career ==
In 1861, Constable started a legal practice in Towson, Maryland. In 1863, he moved his office to Elkton. Most of his legal career was in Elkton. In 1892, he had a law office in Wilmington, Delaware.

Constable was a Democrat. He served as a member of the Maryland House of Delegates, representing Cecil County in 1876. He served as chairman of the judiciary committee. At the time of his death, he was president of the Maryland Democratic Association.

Constable managed the Cecil Democrat with George W. Cruikshank for a time.

== Personal life and death ==
In 1866, Constable married Elizabeth Black Groome, sister of James Black Groome and daughter of John Charles Groome. They had nine children, Albert, John Groome (or John J.), Henry Lyttleton, Reginald, William Pepper, Arline, Catherine (or Katherine), Mary and Alice.

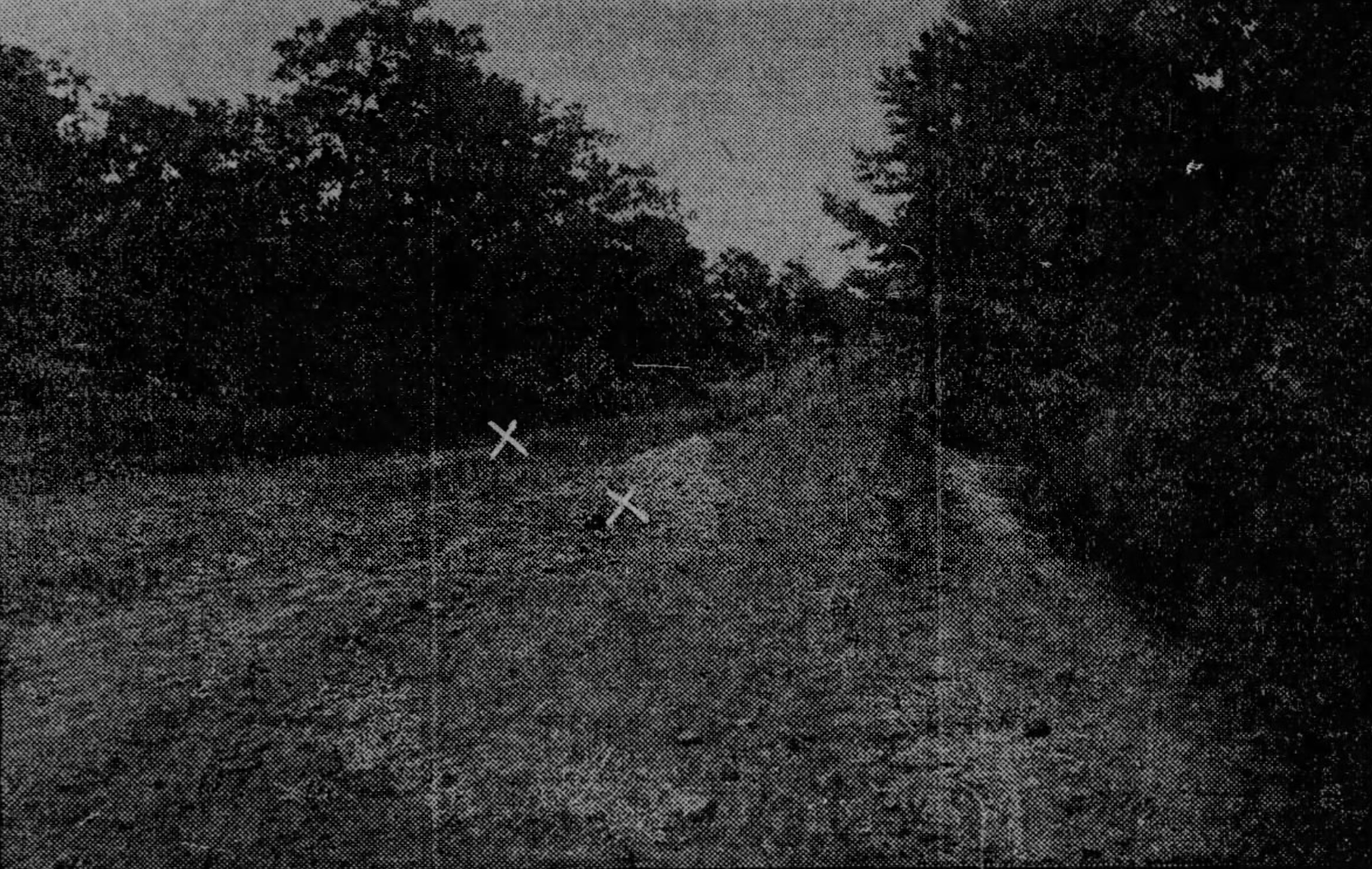
Scene of the shooting of Constable

Constable was robbed and shot on the road at Gray's Hill near Elkton on August 18, 1904. He was shot three times, once near his right eye and twice in his back. He died several days later on August 22 at Maryland General Hospital in Baltimore following damage to his spinal cord and lungs. Following his death, Governor Edwin Warfield posted a US$1,000 reward alongside Cecil County and his family posting a US$750 reward for the identification of his murderer. He was buried at Elkton Presbyterian Cemetery.

== Murder trials ==
In September 1904, a grand jury convened to assess evidence against two suspects. The evidence was reported by the newspapers as "circumstantial" and the grand jury declined to indict. In December 1904, another grand jury was called due to new evidence against the same two suspects and Henry M. McCullough was selected to defend the suspects. Both suspects were found not guilty in January 1905.

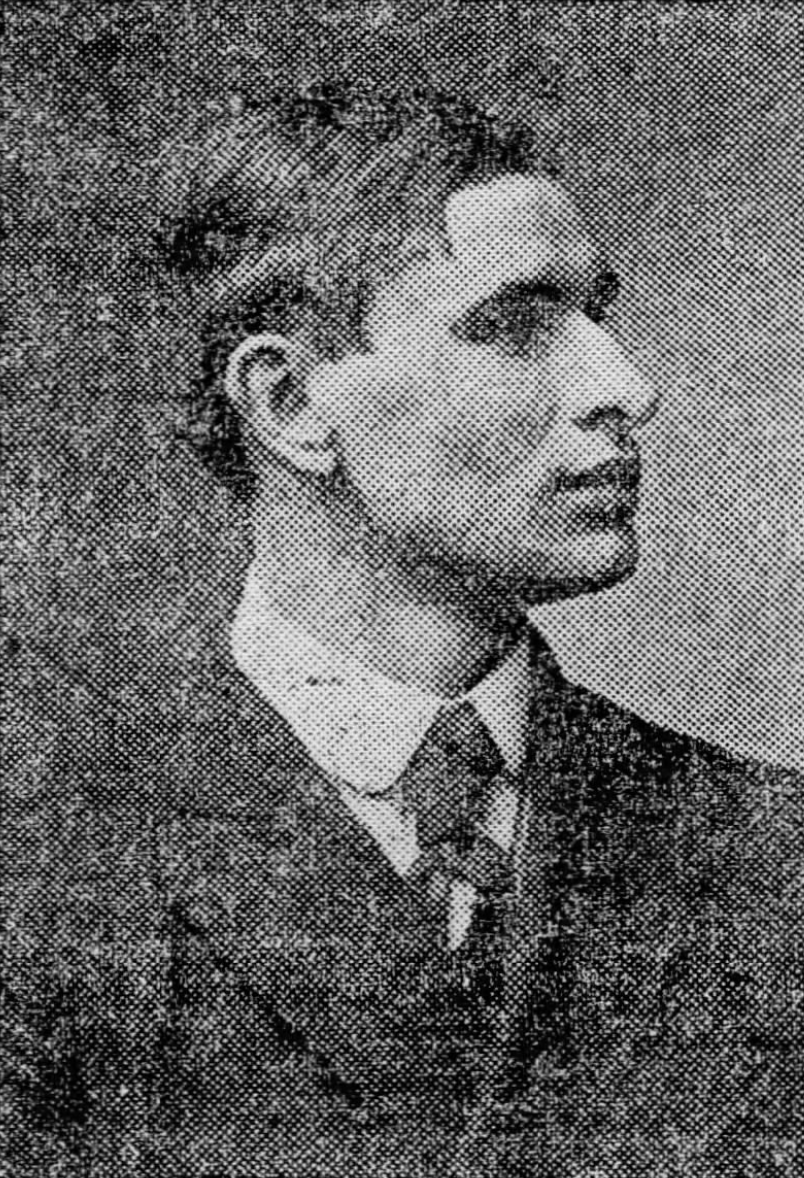
Portrait of Simpers in a 1905 newspaper

In January 1905, the gold watch engraved "A. C." taken from Constable in the robbery was recovered at a pawn shop in Philadelphia. The following month, John M. Simpers, a horse thief who was serving an eight-year term in the Baltimore Penitentiary, confessed to the murder. The prosecutors for the case were Constable's son Albert and James Wilson Squier. Simpers was convicted of first degree murder on March 30, 1905, and he was sentenced to hang. He was hanged on October 20, 1905. A photographer permanently captured that autumn scene in a series of shots.
