= Representative Davis =

Representative Davis may refer to numerous representatives.

== United States representatives ==
=== A ===
- Alexander Davis (politician) (1833–1889), U.S. Representative from Virginia
- Amos Davis (1794–1835), U.S. Representative from Kentucky
- Artur Davis (born 1967), U.S. Representative from Alabama

=== B ===
- Bob Davis (Michigan politician) (1932–2009), U.S. Representative from Michigan

=== C ===
- Charles Russell Davis (1849–1930), U.S. Representative from Minnesota
- Clifford Davis (politician) (1897–1970), U.S. Representative from Tennessee

=== D ===
- Danny Davis (Illinois politician) (born 1941), U.S. Representative from Illinois
- David Davis (Tennessee politician) (born 1959), U.S. Representative from Tennessee
- Don Davis (North Carolina politician) (born 1971), U.S. Representative from North Carolina

=== E ===
- Ewin L. Davis (1876–1949), U.S. Representative from Tennessee

=== G ===
- Garrett Davis (1801–1872), U.S. Representative from Kentucky
- Geoff Davis (born 1958), U.S. Representative from Kentucky
- George R. Davis (Illinois politician) (1840–1899), U.S. Representative from Illinois
- George T. Davis (1810–1877), U.S. Representative from Massachusetts
- Glenn Robert Davis (1914–1988), U.S. Representative from Wisconsin

=== H ===
- Henry Winter Davis (1817–1865), U.S. Representative from Maryland
- Horace Davis (1831–1916), U.S. Representative from California

=== J ===
- Jack Davis (Illinois politician) (1935–2018), U.S. Representative from Illinois
- Jacob C. Davis (1820–1883), U.S. Representative from Illinois
- Jacob E. Davis (1905–2003), U.S. Representative from Ohio
- James C. Davis (1895–1981), U.S. Representative from Georgia
- James H. Davis (congressman) (1853–1940), U.S. Representative from Texas
- Jefferson Davis (1808–1889), U.S. Representative from Mississippi
- Jim Davis (Florida politician) (born 1957), U.S. Representative from Florida
- Jo Ann Davis (1950–2007), U.S. Representative from Virginia
- John Davis (Kansas politician) (1826–1901), U.S. Representative from Kansas
- John Davis (Massachusetts governor) (1787–1854), U.S. Representative from Massachusetts
- John Davis (Pennsylvania politician) (1788–1878), U.S. Representative from Pennsylvania
- John G. Davis (1810–1866), U.S. Representative from Indiana
- John James Davis (1835–1916), U.S. Representative from West Virginia
- John Wesley Davis (1799–1859), U.S. Representative from Indiana
- John W. Davis (1873–1955), U.S. Representative from West Virginia
- John William Davis (Georgia politician) (1916–1992), U.S. Representative from Georgia
- Joseph J. Davis (1828–1892), U.S. Representative from North Carolina

=== L ===
- Lincoln Davis (born 1943), U.S. Representative from Tennessee
- Lowndes H. Davis (1836–1920), U.S. Representative from Missouri

=== M ===
- Mendel Jackson Davis (1942–2007), U.S. Representative from South Carolina

=== N ===
- Noah Davis (judge) (1818–1902), U.S. Representative from New York

=== R ===
- Reuben Davis (representative) (1813–1890), U.S. Representative from Mississippi
- Richard D. Davis (1799–1871), U.S. Representative from New York
- Robert Lee Davis (1893–1967), U.S. Representative from Pennsylvania
- Robert T. Davis (1823–1906), U.S. Representative from Massachusetts
- Robert Wyche Davis (1849–1929), U.S. Representative from Florida
- Rodney Davis (politician) (born 1970), U.S. Representative from Illinois
- Roger Davis (Pennsylvania politician) (1762–1815), U.S. Representative from Pennsylvania

=== S ===
- Samuel Davis (American politician) (1774–1831), U.S. Representative from Massachusetts
- Susan Davis (politician) (born 1944), U.S. Representative from California

=== T ===
- Thomas Davis (Rhode Island politician) (1806–1895), U.S. Representative from Rhode Island
- Thomas B. Davis (1828–1911), U.S. Representative from West Virginia
- Thomas Terry Davis (died 1807), U.S. Representative from Kentucky
- Thomas Treadwell Davis (1810–1872), U.S. Representative from New York
- Timothy Davis (Iowa politician) (1794–1872), U.S. Representative from Iowa
- Timothy Davis (Massachusetts politician) (1821–1888), U.S. Representative from Massachusetts
- Tom Davis (Virginia politician) (born 1949), U.S. Representative from Virginia

=== W ===
- Warren R. Davis (1793–1835), U.S. Representative from South Carolina
- William Morris Davis (congressman) (1815–1891), U.S. Representative from Pennsylvania

== U.S. state representatives ==
=== Alabama ===
- Nicholas Davis Jr. (1825–1875)
- Randy Davis (born 1952)
- William C. Davis (American politician) (1867–1934)

=== Alaska ===
- Bettye Davis (1938–2018)
- Mike Davis (Alaska politician) (born 1946)

=== Arizona ===
- Debbie McCune Davis (born 1951)

=== Connecticut ===
- Charles H. S. Davis (1840–1917)
- Christopher Davis (politician)

=== Delaware ===
- Jehu Davis (1738–1802)
- Vera Gilbride Davis (1894–1974)

=== Florida ===
- Amos Hays Davis (1883–1962)
- Charles E. Davis Jr. (born 1932)
- Daniel Davis (Florida politician) (born 1973)
- Don Davis (Florida politician) (1931–2008)
- Helen Gordon Davis (1926–2015)
- Henry Mack Davis (born 1851)
- Fred Henry Davis (1894–1937)
- Jim Davis (Florida politician) (born 1957)
- Joe Davis (politician) (1923–2021)
- LaVon Bracy Davis
- Robert Wyche Davis (1849–1929)
- Tracie Davis (born 1970)

=== Georgia ===
- Earl Davis (politician) (born 1934)
- Hardie Davis (born 1968)
- James C. Davis (1895–1981)
- Jerry Max Davis (1937–2002)
- Madison Davis (1833–1902)
- Viola Davis (Georgia politician) (born 1963)

=== Illinois ===
- Abel Davis (1874–1937)
- Corneal A. Davis (1900–1995)
- David Davis (Supreme Court justice) (1815–1886)
- Jack Davis (Illinois politician) (1935–2018)
- James N. Davis
- Jed Davis (politician)
- Lisa Davis (politician)
- Monique D. Davis (born 1936)
- Steve Davis (Illinois politician) (born 1949)
- Will Davis (Illinois politician) (born 1968)

=== Indiana ===
- Jim Davis (Indiana politician) (1928–2012)
- John Wesley Davis (1799–1859)
- Michelle Davis (politician)

=== Iowa ===
- Forest Davis (1879–1958)
- Galen Davis (1951–2005)

=== Kansas ===
- Erin Davis (politician) (born 1972)
- Jonathan M. Davis (1871–1943)
- Paul Davis (Kansas politician) (born 1972)

=== Kentucky ===
- Amos Davis (1794–1835)
- Garrett Davis (1801–1872)
- Thomas Terry Davis (died 1807)

=== Louisiana ===
- Paula Davis (born 1973)

=== Maine ===
- Daniel F. Davis (1843–1897)
- Gerald Davis (politician) (born 1936)
- Kenneth Davis Jr.
- Paul Davis (Maine politician) (born 1947)

=== Maryland ===
- Clarence "Tiger" Davis (born 1942)
- Debra Davis (born 1959)
- Dereck E. Davis (born 1967)
- John Ward Davis (died 1907)
- W. Lester Davis (died 1978)
- William B. Davis (politician) (died 1935)

=== Massachusetts ===
- Caleb Davis (1738–1797)
- Edward S. Davis (1808–1887)
- George T. Davis (1810–1877)
- John Davis (U.S. district court judge) (1761–1847)
- Leigh Davis (politician)
- Parker S. Davis (1863–1955)
- Timothy Davis (Massachusetts politician) (1821–1888)

=== Michigan ===
- Bob Davis (Michigan politician) (1932–2009)
- Charles J. Davis (1910–1968)
- Chauncey Davis (politician) (1812–1888)
- Stanley J. Davis (1908–2003)

=== Minnesota ===
- Ben Davis (Minnesota politician) (born 1977)
- Charles Russell Davis (1849–1930)
- Christopher Lawrence Davis (1875–1951)
- Cushman K. Davis (1838–1900)

=== Mississippi ===
- Alexander Kelso Davis (died 1884)
- Greg Davis (Mississippi politician) (born 1966)
- Henry L. Davis (1868–1948)
- Russell C. Davis (politician) (1922–1993)

=== Missouri ===
- Charlie Davis (politician) (born 1965)
- Cynthia Davis (born 1959)
- Dahlman Davis (1940–2024)
- Dorathea Davis (1951–2005)
- Lowndes H. Davis (1836–1920)
- Manvel H. Davis (1891–1959)
- Michael Davis (Missouri politician)

=== New Hampshire ===
- Arnold Davis (politician)
- Dan Davis (New Hampshire politician)
- Fred Davis Jr.

=== North Carolina ===
- Donald Davis (North Carolina Republican politician)
- Joseph J. Davis (1828–1892)
- Rachel Darden Davis (1905–1979)
- Ted Davis Jr. (born 1950)

=== North Dakota ===
- Jayme Davis

=== Ohio ===
- Harry Edward Davis (1882–1955)
- Jacob E. Davis (1905–2003)
- Jim Davis (Ohio politician) (1935–2011)
- Shayla Davis

=== Oklahoma ===
- Dean Davis
- Frank W. Davis (1936–2018)

=== Oregon ===
- Shelly Boshart Davis (born 1980)

=== Pennsylvania ===
- Austin Davis (politician) (born 1989)
- Donald M. Davis (1915–1976)
- Erroll Davis (born 1944)
- Hezekiah Davis (died 1837)
- Robert O. Davis (1910–1992)
- Roger Davis (Pennsylvania politician) (1762–1815)
- Tina Davis
- William H. Davis (Pennsylvania state representative)

=== Rhode Island ===
- Thomas Davis (Rhode Island politician) (1806–1895)

=== South Carolina ===
- Sylleste Davis (born 1961)

=== Tennessee ===
- Anthony Davis (politician) (born 1980)
- David Davis (Tennessee politician) (born 1959)
- Elaine Davis (politician) (born 1967)
- Lincoln Davis (born 1943)

=== Texas ===
- Aicha Davis
- Bob Davis (Texas politician) (1941–2024)
- John E. Davis (Texas politician) (born 1960)
- Samuel David Davis (1863–1933)
- Sarah Davis (politician) (born 1976)
- Yvonne Davis

=== Utah ===
- Gene Davis (politician) (born 1945)

=== Vermont ===
- Bliss N. Davis (1801–1885)
- Charles Davis (Vermont judge) (1789–1863)
- Frank H. Davis (1910–1979)
- Susan Hatch Davis (born 1953)

=== Washington ===
- Ed Davis (politician) (1890–1956)
- Lauren Davis (politician) (born 1986)

=== Wyoming ===
- Bob Davis (Wyoming politician)
- Cliff Davis (1908–1990)

== Hawaiian Kingdom representatives ==
- Robert Grimes Davis (1819–1872)

== See also ==
- List of people with surname Davis
- Senator Davis (disambiguation)
