= Bouchelle =

Bouchelle is a surname. Notable people with the surname include:

- John W. Bouchelle (1807–1898), American politician and farmer
- John W. Bouchelle (died 1937), American politician and farmer
- Lisa Bouchelle, American singer and songwriter
