= George Biddle (politician) =

American politician (1836–1909)

Member of the Maryland House of Delegates from the Cecil County district
- In office 1870–1870 Serving with John Owens, William Richards, James Touchstone
- Preceded by: John Ward Davis, Levi R. Mearns, William Richards, James Touchstone
- Succeeded by: James Black Groome, Levi R. Mearns, Andrew J. Penington

Personal details
- Born: August 20, 1836 near Cecilton, Maryland, U.S.
- Died: December 14, 1909 (aged 73) Elkton, Maryland, U.S.
- Resting place: St. Stephen's Episcopal Church; Earleville, Maryland, U.S.
- Party: Democratic
- Spouse: Katherine Kettell (m. 1866)
- Education: Delaware College
- Occupation: Politician; school commissioner and examiner; farmer

George Biddle (August 20, 1836 – December 14, 1909) was an American politician from Maryland. He served as a member of the Maryland House of Delegates, representing Cecil County in 1870.

== Early life ==
George Biddle was born on August 20, 1836, near Cecilton, Maryland, to Frances "Fannie" A. (née Perkins) and George Biddle. He was related to Congressman James Barroll Ricaud and Maryland comptroller Thomas J. Keating through his mother. Biddle was educated in local schools and in Wilmington, Delaware. He was also educated in Charlottesville, New York. He graduated from Delaware College in 1855.

== Career ==
Biddle was an advocate for the establishment of free public schools and the appointment of school commissioners by circuit court judges. He was a Democrat. He served as a member of the Maryland House of Delegates, representing Cecil County in 1870. While a delegate, he was successful in authoring and passing a bill that allowed appointment of school commissioners by circuit court judges. The law continued for twenty years before the appointment power was given to the governor.

In 1872, Biddle was appointed as school commissioner. He served in that role until he resigned in 1892. In 1892, he became the school examiner of Cecil County. He also served as secretary and treasurer of the board of school commissioners. He was a trustee of Delaware College. He was also a farmer and fruit grower. He was a member of the Peninsula Horticultural Association.

== Personal life ==
Biddle married Katherine Kettell, daughter of Methodist minister George F. Kettell, on January 4, 1866. He was a vestryman of St. Stephen's Protestant Episcopal Church.

Biddle died of heart failure on December 14, 1909, at his home on East Main Street in Elkton. He was buried at St. Stephen's Protestant Episcopal Church near Earleville.
