= Touchstone =

Touchstone may refer to:

- Touchstone (assaying tool), a stone used to identify precious metals
- Touchstone (metaphor), a means of assaying relative merits of a concept

== Entertainment ==
=== Literature ===
- The Touch-Stone, a 1728 satirical essay collection on London entertainments attributed to James Ralph
- The Touchstone (novella), a novella by Edith Wharton
- Touchstone (Garth Nix character), a fictional character from Garth Nix's Old Kingdom trilogy

=== Stage and film ===
- The Touchstone (play), an 1817 comedy play by James Kenney
- Touchstone (As You Like It), a fictional character in Shakespeare's As You Like It
- Prem Kahani (1937 film), working title Touchstone, an Indian romantic drama film
- Touchstone (Stargate SG-1), an episode of the television series Stargate SG-1

=== Music ===
- Touchstone (band), rock group from the U.K.
- Touchstone (album), a 1982 album by Chick Corea
- The Touchstone (album), by British jazz trio Azimuth
- Touchstone, an Irish-music band fronted by Tríona Ní Dhomhnaill

=== Other ===
- Touchstone (Syphon Filter), a character from the Syphon Filter games

== Companies ==
- Touchstone Energy, an energy cooperative
- Touchstone Home Entertainment
- Touchstone Pictures, a film distribution label of Walt Disney Studios Motion Pictures
- Touchstone Semiconductor, a manufacturer
- TouchStone Software
- Touchstone Studios
- Touchstone Television, a television production company formerly called Fox 21 Television Studios
- Touchstone Television (1985–2007), former name of television production company ABC Signature
- Touchstone Books, an imprint of Simon & Schuster

== Other ==
- James Touchstone (died 1872), American politician from Maryland
- James M. Touchstone (1846–1886), American politician from Maryland
- Touchstone (horse) (1831–1861), thoroughbred racehorse
- Touchstone (magazine), a Christian journal
- Touchstone file, a network parameter data file
- Touchstone Memorial Award
- Touchstone Theatre, a professional theatre company in Vancouver, British Columbia, Canada
- Operation Touchstone, a series of 14 nuclear tests conducted at the Nevada Test Site in 1987 and 1988
- Touchstone, the brand name of the inductive charger for HP/Palm WebOS devices
- The Touchstone, a polemical work by Ibn Shaprut
- Parasmani (lit. 'Touchstone'), a 1963 Indian film
