= October 1838 Maryland gubernatorial election =

- October 3, 1838
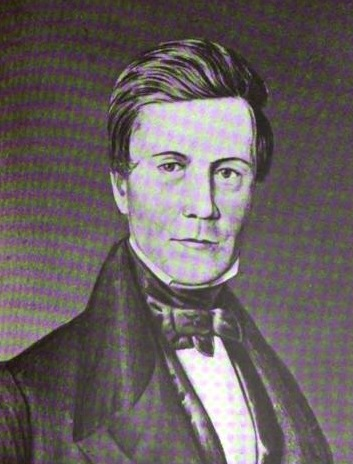

Nominee	William Grason	John N. Steele
Party	Democratic	Whig
Popular vote	27,722	27,409
Percentage	50.28%	49.72%
- County results Thomas: 50–60% Johnson: 50–60% 60–70% Tie: 50%
Governor before election
Thomas Veazey
Whig
Elected Governor
William Grason
Democratic

The October 1838 Maryland gubernatorial election was held on October 3, 1838, in order to elect the Governor of Maryland. Following an 1838 constitutional amendment, Governors would be elected through popular vote instead of by the Maryland General Assembly. Democratic nominee and former member of the Maryland House of Delegates William Grason narrowly defeated Whig nominee and former member of the United States House of Representatives from Maryland's 1st district John N. Steele.

== General election ==
On election day, October 3, 1838, Democratic nominee William Grason won the election by a margin of 313 votes against his opponent Whig nominee John N. Steele, thereby gaining Democratic control over the office of governor. Grason was sworn in as the 25th Governor of Maryland on January 7, 1839.

=== Results ===
Maryland gubernatorial election, October 1838
Party	Candidate	Votes	%
Democratic	William Grason	27,722	50.28
Whig	John N. Steele	27,409	49.72
Total votes		55,131	100.00
Democratic gain from Whig			
