= William T. Vinsinger =

American politician (died 1956)

Member of the Maryland House of Delegates from the Cecil County district
- In office 1927–1930 Serving with John W. Bouchelle and Arnold N. Crawford
- Preceded by: J. Frank Brickley, George L. Ewing, J. Will Perkins
- Succeeded by: William E. Briscoe, Frederick H. Leffler, Thomas H. Reynolds

Personal details
- Died: December 16, 1956 (aged 82) Elkton, Maryland, U.S.
- Resting place: Elkton Cemetery
- Party: Democratic
- Spouse: Carrie Gray
- Occupation: Politician; miller

William T. Vinsinger (died December 16, 1956) was an American politician from Maryland. He served as a member of the Maryland House of Delegates, representing Cecil County from 1927 to 1930.

== Early life ==
William T. Vinsinger was born to Cordelia R. (née Strickland) and Henry Vinsinger. His father was a miller and ran the firm Davis & Vinsinger.

== Career ==
Vinsinger worked as a miller in Elkton.

Vinsinger was a Democrat. He served as a member of the Maryland House of Delegates, representing Cecil County from 1927 to 1930.

He also worked in the office of the treasurer in Cecil County.

== Personal life ==
Vinsinger married Carrie Gray, daughter of William M. Gray. He lived at 513 North Street in Elkton.

Vinsinger died on December 16, 1956, aged 82, at Union Hospital in Elkton. He was buried at Elkton Cemetery.
