= Manlove =

Manlove is a surname. Notable people with the surname include:

- Bill Manlove (born 1933), former American football coach, president of the American Football Coaches Association
- Charlie Manlove (1862–1952), 19th-century American Major League Baseball player born in Philadelphia, Pennsylvania
- Colin Manlove (1942–2020), British literary critic with a particular interest in fantasy
- Dudley Manlove (1914–1996), American radio announcer and actor
- Eugene Manlove Rhodes (1869–1934), American writer who was nicknamed the "cowboy chronicler"
- Joe J. Manlove (1876–1956), U.S. Representative from Missouri
- Timothy Manlove (1663–1699), English Presbyterian minister and physician
- Wroth H. Manlove (died 1985), American politician and judge

== See also ==
- USS Manlove, an Evarts-class destroyer escort of the United States Navy during World War II
