= William M. Knight =

American politician and merchant (1837–1910)

Member of the Maryland House of Delegates from the Cecil County district
- In office 1878–1880 Serving with James M. Touchstone and James Turner

Member of the Maryland Senate from the Cecil County district
- In office 1874–1878
- Preceded by: John M. Miller
- Succeeded by: John M. Miller

Personal details
- Born: 1837 Knight Island, Cecil County, Maryland, U.S.
- Died: May 4, 1910 (aged 72–73) Baltimore, Maryland, U.S.
- Resting place: Elkton Cemetery; Elkton, Maryland, U.S.
- Party: Democratic
- Spouse: Maria Groome
- Children: 6
- Education: Princeton College
- Occupation: Politician; merchant

William M. Knight (1837 – May 4, 1910) was an American politician and merchant from Maryland. He served as a member of the Maryland Senate, representing Cecil County from 1874 to 1878. He served as a member of the Maryland House of Delegates from 1878 to 1880.

== Early life ==
William M. Knight was born in 1837 at Knight Island on the Sassafras River in Cecil County, Maryland, to Rebecca (née Ringgold) and William Knight. He was descended from Stephen Knight, a judge and member of the Maryland House of Burgesses. Knight studied in county schools and then in Wilmington, Delaware. He attended Princeton College. He began studying law in the office of George Ross Veazey, but abandoned it and became a farmer.

== Career ==
In 1856, Knight was appointed special deputy collector of customs by the collector. After the end of that term, Knight joined with the grain firm of George E. Bowdoin. After Bowdoin's death, Knight formed the grain firm Frame, Knight & Co. with George Frame and J. Barry Mahool, later mayor of Baltimore. He served as a member of the board of directors and was vice president of Maryland's Chamber of Commerce.

Knight was a Democrat. He was a member of the Maryland Senate, representing Cecil County, from 1874 to 1878. He was a member of the Maryland House of Delegates, representing Cecil County from 1878 to 1880. He served on the staff of Governor James Black Groome.

== Personal life ==
Knight married Maria Groome, daughter of John C. Groome and sister of Governor Groome. They had two sons and four daughters, James Groome, William M., Elizabeth, Ethel, Rebecca and Mrs. Lyndon Tracy. He lived at McLane Place near Bohemia Bridge in Bohemia, Maryland, for a number of years.

Knight died May 4, 1910, at his home at 2121 Maryland Avenue in Baltimore. He was buried at Elkton Cemetery in Elkton.
