= William Simcoe =

American politician

Member of the Maryland House of Delegates from the Cecil County district
- In office 1840–1841 Serving with James L. Maxwell and William H. Morton
- Preceded by: John C. Cameron, Samuel B. Foard, John J. Heckart
- Succeeded by: Amor T. Forwood, William Knight, John Owens

Personal details
- Born: Carpenter Point, Maryland, U.S.
- Party: Whig
- Spouse: Rebecca Cazier
- Children: 13
- Occupation: Politician; farmer

William Simcoe was an American politician from Maryland. He served as a member of the Maryland House of Delegates, representing Cecil County from 1840 to 1841.

== Early life ==
William Simcoe was born at Carpenter Point, Maryland, to George Simcoe.

== Career ==
Simcoe was a farmer. Simcoe was a Whig. He served as a member of the Maryland House of Delegates, representing Cecil County from 1840 to 1841.

== Personal life ==
Simcoe married Rebecca Cazier, daughter of Thomas Cazier, of Cecil County. They had thirteen children, including John S., Louisa J. and Mrs. Manley. He was a trustee and steward of the Methodist Episcopal Church.
