= 1905 Maryland Comptroller election =

- November 7, 1905

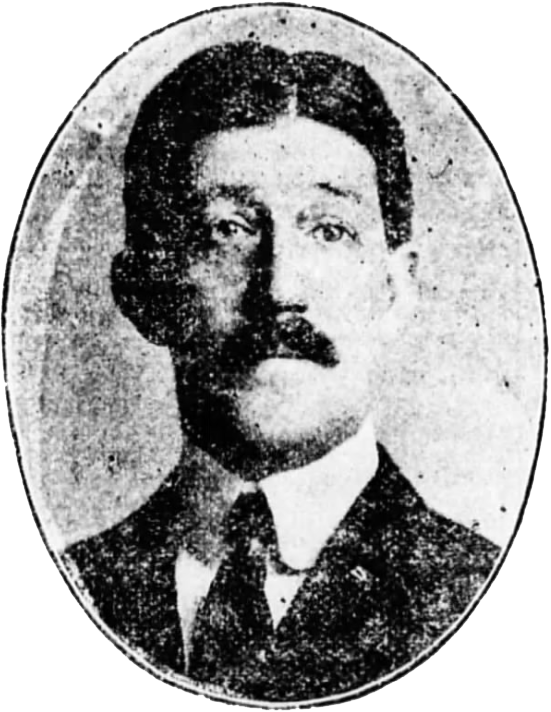
| Nominee | Gordon T. Atkinson | Henry M. McCullough |
| Party | Democratic | Republican |
| Popular vote | 93,483 | 85,978 |
| Percentage | 50.16% | 46.13% |
- County results Atkinson: 40–50% 50–60% 60–70% McCullough: 40–50% 50–60% 60–70%
Comptroller before election
Gordon T. Atkinson
Democratic
Elected Comptroller
Gordon T. Atkinson
Democratic

The 1905 Maryland comptroller election was held on November 7, 1905, in order to elect the comptroller of Maryland. Democratic nominee and incumbent comptroller Gordon T. Atkinson defeated Republican nominee and incumbent member of the Maryland Senate Henry M. McCullough, Prohibition nominee Richard Henry Holme and Socialist nominee Sylvester L. Young.

== General election ==
On election day, November 7, 1905, Democratic nominee Gordon T. Atkinson won re-election by a margin of 7,505 votes against his foremost opponent Republican nominee Henry M. McCullough, thereby retaining Democratic control over the office of comptroller. Atkinson was sworn in for his second term on January 15, 1906.

=== Results ===
Maryland Comptroller election, 1905
| Party | Candidate | Votes | % |
|---|---|---|---|
| Democratic | Gordon T. Atkinson (incumbent) | 93,483 | 50.16 |
| Republican | Henry M. McCullough | 85,978 | 46.13 |
| Prohibition | Richard Henry Holme | 4,317 | 2.31 |
| Socialist | Sylvester L. Young | 2,603 | 1.40 |
| Total votes | | 186,381 | 100.00 |
| Democratic hold | | | |
