= Balderston =

Balderston may refer to:

== Places ==
- Balderston, an alternative spelling of the British village of Balderstone, Lancashire

== People ==
- Elwood Balderston (died 1921), American politician from Maryland
- John Balderston (Cambridge) (died 1719), Master of Emmanuel College, Cambridge
- John L. Balderston (1889–1954), an American playwright and screenwriter
- Kris M. Balderston, managing director of the Global Partnership Initiative and the Deputy Special Representative for Global Partnerships in the Office of the Secretary of State
- Caroline Balderston Parry (1945–2022), a Canadian writer, musician, celebrator, and consultant

== See also ==
- Balderstone (disambiguation)
