= Samuel B. Foard =

American politician and judge (1807–1881)

Member of the Maryland House of Representatives from the Cecil County district
- In office 1838–1840 Serving with John W. Comegys, George Gillespie, John C. Cameron, John J. Heckart
- Preceded by: John W. Comegys, John Evans, Charles W. Parker, Johnson Simpers
- Succeeded by: James L. Maxwell, William H. Morton, William Simcoe

Personal details
- Born: Samuel Bayard Foard; November 29, 1807 Bohemia Manor, Maryland, U.S.
- Died: March 18, 1881 (aged 73) Elkton, Maryland, U.S.
- Resting place: Forrest Cemetery
- Party: Democratic
- Spouse: Alice Rebecca Cochran (m. 1830)
- Relations: Richard I. Foard (brother)
- Children: 6
- Occupation: Politician; farmer; judge

Samuel Bayard Foard (November 29, 1807 – March 18, 1881) was an American politician and judge from Maryland. He served in the Maryland House of Delegates from 1838 to 1840.

== Early life ==
Samuel Bayard Foard was born on November 29, 1807, to Ann (née Bayard) and Levi George Foard, in Bohemia Manor, Maryland. His father was captain of a company in the War of 1812. His brother Richard was a member of the Maryland House of Delegates and his brother Edward L. was a Cecil County sheriff.

== Career ==
Foard was a Democrat. He was county commissioner in 1834 and served in the Maryland House of Delegates, representing Cecil County, from 1838 to 1840. He was appointed judge of the Orphans' Court by Governor William Grason on March 20, 1841. He served in that role until December 17, 1841. He had a farm. In 1850, he moved to Elkton, Maryland, and engaged in merchandizing with R. G. Reese. He helped start the Farmers and Merchants Bank and worked as cashier. He was appointed notary public by Governor James Black Groome. He resigned as notary public to accept an appointment as justice of the peace in August 1876. He remained in that role until his death.

== Personal life ==
Foard married Alice Rebecca Cochran, daughter of Robert Cochran and sister of Delaware governor John P. Cochran, on February 23, 1830. They had six children, Robert L. C., Anna B., Laura V., Lavinia M., Frank Thomas and Samuel B. Jr. His wife died in 1854. His daughter Anna married state senator John M. Miller.

Foard died of pneumonia on March 18, 1881, at his home in Elkton. He was buried in Forrest Cemetery.
