= Heckart =

Heckart is a surname. Notable people with the surname include:

- Eileen Heckart (1919–2001), American actress
- John J. Heckart (died 1872), American politician from Maryland
