= 1857 Maryland gubernatorial election =

- November 4, 1857
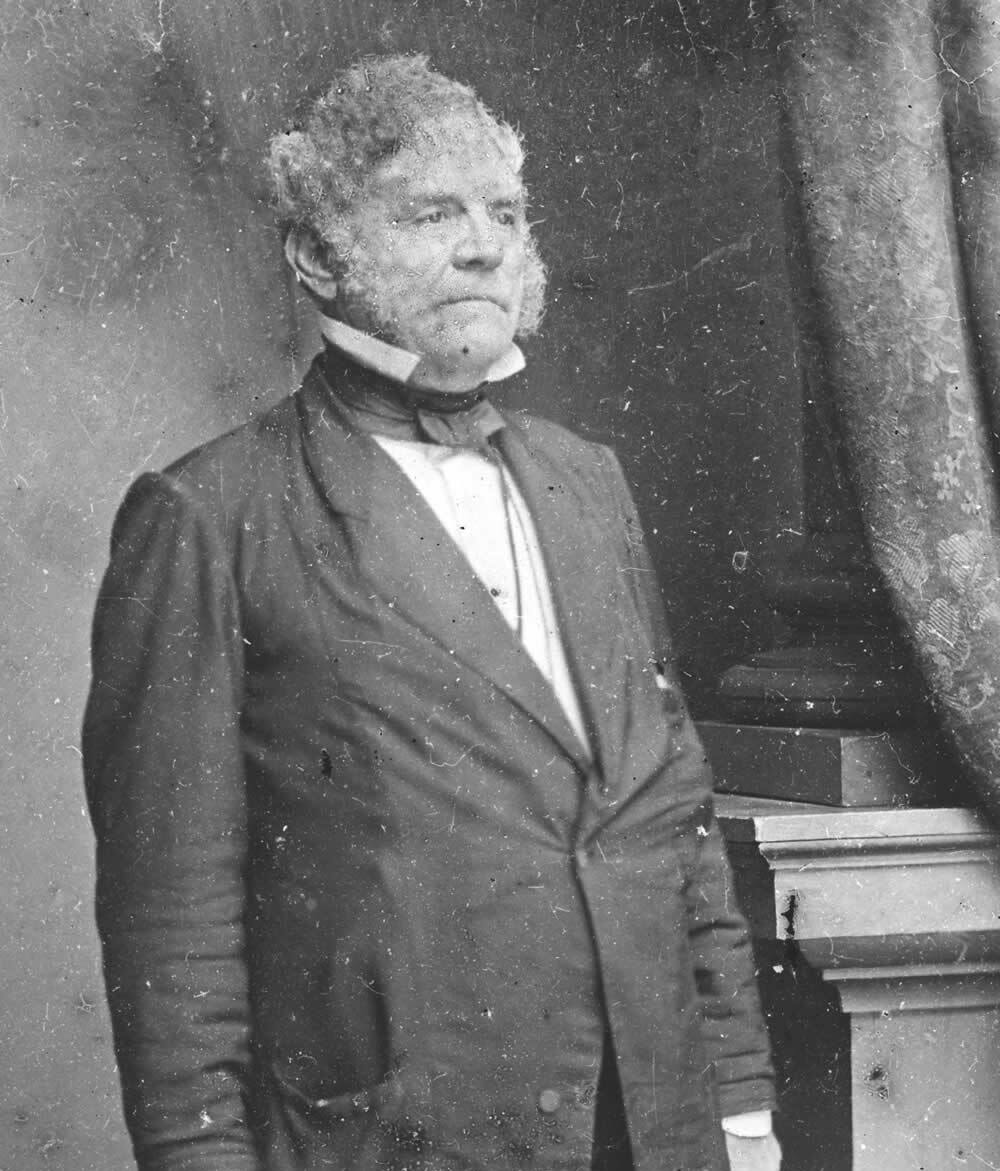

Nominee	Thomas Holliday Hicks	John Charles Groome
Party	Know Nothing	Democratic
Popular vote	47,141	38,681
Percentage	54.93%	45.07%
- County results Hicks: 50–60% 60–70% Groome: 50–60% 60–70% 70–80%
Governor before election
Thomas Watkins Ligon
Democratic
Elected Governor
Thomas Holliday Hicks
Know Nothing

The 1857 Maryland gubernatorial election was held on November 4, 1857, in order to elect the Governor of Maryland. American Party nominee and former member of the Maryland House of Delegates Thomas Holliday Hicks defeated Democratic nominee and former Secretary of State of Maryland John Charles Groome.

== General election ==
On election day, November 4, 1857, American Party nominee Thomas Holliday Hicks won the election by a margin of 8,460 votes against his opponent, Democratic nominee John Charles Groome, thereby gaining American Party control over the office of Governor. Hicks was sworn in as the 31st Governor of Maryland on January 13, 1858.

=== Results ===
Maryland gubernatorial election, 1857
Party	Candidate	Votes	%
Know Nothing	Thomas Holliday Hicks	47,141	54.93
Democratic	John Charles Groome	38,681	45.07
Total votes		85,822	100.00
Know Nothing gain from Democratic			
