= Henry McCulloch =

Henry McCulloch may refer to:

- Henry Eustace McCulloch (1816–1895), Texas Ranger and Confederate States general
- Henry Byron McCulloch (1877–1962), member of the House of Commons of Canada

== See also ==
- Henry McCullough ( 1943–2016), musician and singer-songwriter from Northern Ireland
- Henry M. McCullough (1858–1930), politician and lawyer from Maryland
