= Foard =

Foard may refer to:

== Places ==
- Foard County, Texas, a county of Texas, United States

== People with the surname ==
- Aubrey Foard, American classical tubist
- Glenn Foard, English archaeologist
- Samuel B. Foard (1807–1881), American politician and judge from Maryland
