= John Henderson (Maryland politician) =

American politician

Member of the Maryland House of Delegates from the Cecil County district
- In office 1835–1836 Serving with George McCullogh, Lambert D. Nowland, Granville S. Townsend, John W. Comegys, John Pierson, Thomas Taylor Jr.
- Preceded by: Bennett F. Bussey, Joseph Harlan, Lambert D. Nowland, William C. Scott
- Succeeded by: John W. Comegys, John Evans, Charles W. Parker, Johnson Simpers

Personal details
- Born: Ireland
- Party: Democratic
- Spouse: Rebecca A. Groves
- Children: 12

John Henderson was an American politician from Maryland. He served as a member of the Maryland House of Delegates, representing Cecil County from 1835 to 1836.

== Early life ==
John Henderson was born and grew up in Ireland. He emigrated to the United States and moved to Baltimore, Maryland.

== Career ==
Henderson served in the War of 1812 and received the rank of captain. He moved to Elkton, Maryland, and then moved elsewhere in Cecil County.

Henderson was a Democrat. He served as a member of the Maryland House of Delegates, representing Cecil County from 1835 to 1836.

== Personal life ==
Henderson married and had four children, including John S., Rebecca and Ann. He married Rebecca A. Groves. They had eight children, Gustavus, Alice J., Nora, Susan, Emily, Benjamina, Martha and William C. His son William C. was a farmer and owned a country store in Appleton.
