= W. Atwood Montgomery =

American politician (1854–1931)

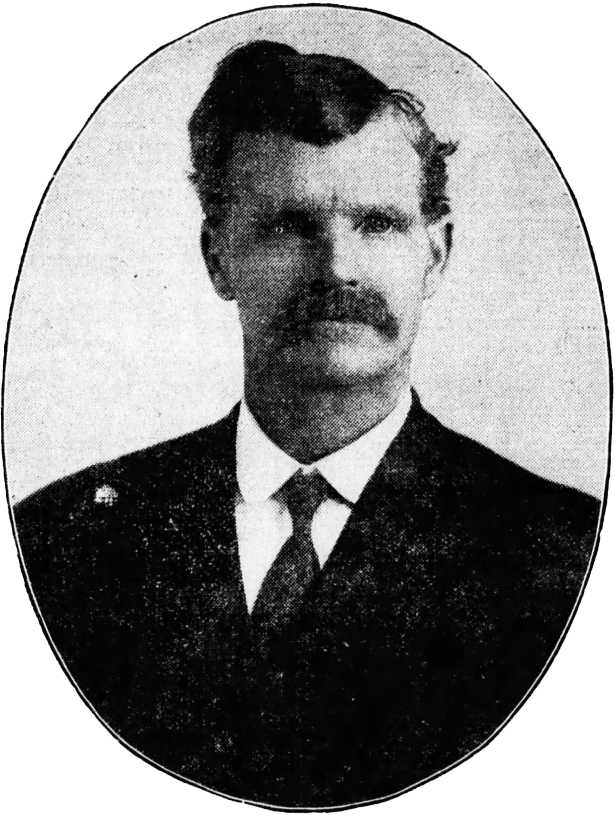
- Montgomery in 1905 newspaper

Member of the Maryland House of Delegates from the Cecil County district
- In office 1906–1908 Serving with Alfred B. Cameron and William B. Davis

Personal details
- Born: February 20, 1854 near New London, Pennsylvania, U.S.
- Died: September 30, 1931 (aged 77) near Pilot, Cecil County, Maryland, U.S.
- Resting place: Eastland Friends Meetinghouse
- Party: Republican
- Children: 1
- Occupation: Politician

W. Atwood Montgomery (February 20, 1854 – September 30, 1931) was an American politician from Maryland. He served as a member of the Maryland House of Delegates, representing Cecil County from 1906 to 1908.

== Early life ==
W. Atwood Montgomery was born on February 20, 1854, to Sarah and John E. Montgomery near New London, Pennsylvania. He grew up on his father's farm. He moved around 1891 to Cecil County, Maryland.

== Career ==
Montgomery was a Republican. He was a member of the Maryland House of Delegates, representing Cecil County, from 1906 to 1908. Montgomery ran for sheriff of Cecil County in 1909, but lost to James Wesley McAllister.

== Personal life ==
Montgomery had a wife. She died in 1911. They had one daughter, Mrs. Daniel Keen.

Montgomery owned a summer house near Oakwood, but it burned down in 1910. For a time, he lived at Little Britain Township, Pennsylvania. He moved to Pilot, Cecil County, in 1930.

Montgomery died on September 30, 1931, at his home near Pilot, Cecil County. He was buried at Eastland Friends Meetinghouse's cemetery.
