= Mastermind (American band) =

American progressive rock band

- Origin: Browns Mills, New Jersey, U.S.
- Genres: Progressive rock Progressive metal
- Years active: 1986–present
- Labels: Lion Music; InsideOut Records; Avalon Marquee Records; Cyclops Records; Prozone Dutch East Records; Zero-EMI Records; ZNR Records
- Members: Bill Berends; Rich Berends; Jens Johansson; Tracy McShane
- Past members: Phil Antolino; Bob Eckman†; Mickey Simmonds; Lisa Bouchelle
- Website: Mastermind's official website

Mastermind is an American progressive rock band from New Jersey, formed by the brothers Bill Berends and Rich Berends in 1986.

There is a power metal band in Japan also named Mastermind which has no relation to the better-known American Mastermind (although oddly enough, Jens Johansson did make a guest appearance on a Mastermind Japan recording).

== History ==
Mastermind was founded in 1986 when guitarist Bill Berends and his brother, drummer Rich Berends, met bassist Phil Antolino. As a power trio, they were very much in the Emerson, Lake & Palmer style, with fast and flashy playing inside anthems of considerable grandeur—except with guitar and guitar-synthesizer leads instead of keyboards. That year, the band played many dates on the New Jersey club circuit, and recorded a self-produced cassette, Volume One.

Guitar Player Magazine columnist, producer & Shrapnel Records founder Mike Varney featured Bill in his "Spotlight" column in 1988. As a result of this exposure and the overwhelmingly positive response to their live shows, Mastermind was signed to Magna Carta, the first band the fledgling label signed. Unfortunately, early startup delays hampered their release schedule, and Mastermind was forced to turn to a small independent label ZNR Records to finally re-release Volume One on CD in December, 1990. With this release Mastermind's reputation began to grow nationally and internationally.

Their second album, Mastermind Volume Two: Brainstorm, was recorded Winter 1988-Spring 1991 and released in January 1992, with an even heavier sound than the first. The 20-minute title track harkens back to ELP's "Tarkus" and has been a frequent concert highlight.

Between mid-1993 and early 1994, the brothers completed their third studio recording, Tragic Symphony, released in Japan in November '94. The album was released worldwide in June 1995 by Cyclops Records/GFT in Europe and by Dutch East India Trading in North America on their in-house Prozone label. The album also was released in Korea by Jigu Records, making for total sales far exceeding any of the band's releases to date.

In 1995, Mastermind opened for John Wetton's acoustic tour by playing a special unplugged acoustic show, and also opened for Joe Satriani. By early 1996, their fourth album, Until Eternity, was completed and released in Japan that June. It was released in Europe and North America in October 1996.

With album sales strong and interest high, the first two Mastermind discs were re-released in Europe and Japan and the band set off to tour the globe. In 1997, Mastermind performed live headlining in Japan, played festivals in Europe, supported Rush in New Jersey, and opened for Fish (of Marillion fame) across America.

In June 1997, Cyclops released a limited-edition Live in Tokyo disc (recorded earlier that year at On Air West), which quickly sold out its limited (1000 copies) edition. As 1997 wrapped up, the brothers decided it was time for a change and famed Swedish metal keyboardist Jens Johansson (ex-Yngwie Malmsteen, Stratovarius) was invited to record with the band.

The band spent most of 1998 completing their album with Johansson, Excelsior!, which was released at the end of 1998. The new group debuted at Baltimore's POWERMAD 1998 festival in August.

Angels of the Apocalypse, the second album featuring Johansson, brought in mezzo-soprano vocalist Lisa Bouchelle to shake things up. The album featured a version of ELP's "The Endless Enigma Parts 1 & II". More touring followed, and the album was released in 2000 by InsideOut Records.

In 2001, a live album (recorded in 1999) was released on the band's own StellarVox Records label.

Finally in 2005, an extended-play CD single (44 minutes) was released, featuring two tracks from forthcoming studio album plus a version of A Perfect Circle's "Weak & Powerless" and four tracks from Mastermind's extensive concert repertoire recorded live in the studio in 2005.

In February 2007, after keeping up a blistering touring pace for twenty years, performing every year between 1987 and 2007 in the USA, Europe, and Japan, the Berends decided to shift gears somewhat. They started a cover band, calling themselves Berends Bros. Band (BBB), to have a little fun with their roots of blues & old school psychedelic blues rock. Recruiting blues rocker John Benussi on bass from a local Jimi Hendrix tribute act Axis they play a repertoire of favorites both old & new. The band performed live for the first time in March 2007 to great response, and have played extensively around home (New Jersey and Pennsylvania) throughout 2007.

The Berends brothers have also played as The Berends/Wilson Trio (abv. BWT), a journey into the music of Cream with Ed Wilson on bass & vocals.

After five years, Mastermind released the long-awaited Insomnia album in February 2010. Extensive audio and video clips of all Berends brothers bands can be found on their website.

After moving to São Paulo, Brazil, Bill Berends formed a new version of Mastermind in 2019 with Brazilian musicians Gabriel Costa (Violeta de Outono, Gong Global Family) on bass and Carlos Camasi on drums. With this line-up the group played a few gigs, most notably the 3rd Totem Prog Festival in São Paulo in 2019.

== Members ==
=== Most recent lineup ===
- Bill Berends - guitar, midi-guitar, synthesizer, vocals
- Rich Berends - drums, percussion
- Tracy McShane - lead vocal
- Jens Johansson - keyboards (studio)

=== Former members ===
- Lisa Bouchelle - lead vocal, acoustic guitar (1998–2000)
- Bob Eckman (deceased) - bass (1992–1993, 1998–2000)
- Phil Antolino - bass (1986–1989, 1994–1997)

=== Touring musicians ===
- Mickey Simmonds - keyboards (1999)
- Laura Johnson - bass, vocals (2005–2007)
- Mike Fillius - bass (2005)
- Greg Hagen - bass (2002–2004)
- Marty DeSantis - bass (2002)
- Tim Spillane - bass (2000–2001)
- Mark Stavola - bass (1989–1992)

=== Additional musicians ===
- Chris Eike - bass - Insomnia
- Hollis Brown - violin - Angels of the Apocalypse
- John Paolini - vocal - Angels of the Apocalypse
- Mike Mironov - percussion - Excelsior!

== Discography ==
- Mastermind Volume One, 1990 (ZNR Records USA, Cyclops Records UK, Prozone Records USA)
- Mastermind Volume Two: Brainstorm, 1991 (ZNR Records USA, Cyclops Records UK, Marquee Records Japan)
- Mastermind III: Tragic Symphony, 1994 (Zero-EMI Records Japan, Cyclops Records UK, Prozone Records USA)
- Mastermind IV: Until Eternity, 1996 (Cyclops Records UK, Marquee Records Japan, Prozone Records USA)
- Cyclops Sampler, 1996 (Cyclops Records one exclusive track)
- Live in Tokyo, 1997 (Cyclops Records limited edition)
- Excelsior!', 1998 (InsideOut Records)
- Angels of the Apocalypse, 2000 (InsideOut Records)
- Prog, Fusion, Metal, Leather & Sweat - LIVE!, 2001 (StellarVox Records)
- Broken (CD-Single/EP), 2005
- Insomnia, 2010 (Lion Music)
