= Albert Constable =

American politician and judge (1805–1855)

Member of the U.S. House of Representatives from Maryland's 5th district
- In office March 4, 1845 – March 3, 1847
- Preceded by: Jacob A. Preston
- Succeeded by: Alexander Evans

Personal details
- Born: June 3, 1805 Charlestown, Maryland, U.S.
- Died: August 22, 1855 (aged 50) Camden, New Jersey, U.S.
- Resting place: Green Mount Cemetery; Baltimore, Maryland, U.S.
- Party: Democratic
- Children: 4, including Albert
- Occupation: Politician; lawyer; judge

Albert Constable (June 3, 1805 – August 22, 1855) was a U.S. Democratic politician, lawyer and judge from Maryland. He served as a member of the U.S. House of Representatives from 1845 to 1847.

== Early life ==
Albert Constable was born on June 3, 1805, near Charlestown, Maryland, to John Constable. He grew up on the family farm. He studied law in Chestertown in the office of Judge Chambers and was admitted to the bar in 1829.

== Career ==
After getting admitted to the bar, he settled in Bel Air and then moved to Baltimore to practice law. He later moved to Perryville.

He was elected as a Democrat to the United States House of Representatives from Maryland and served from March 4, 1845, to March 3, 1847. He was a member of the reform convention in 1850. He served as judge of the circuit court of Maryland from 1851 to 1855. He held the role at the time of his death.

== Personal life ==
Constable married Hannah Archer, sister of Henry W. Archer. They had four children, Isabel S., Albert, Johanna and Alice. His son Albert was a lawyer and state delegate.

Constable died on August 22, 1855, in Camden, New Jersey. He was buried in Green Mount Cemetery in Baltimore.

U.S. House of Representatives
Preceded by Jacob Alexander Preston	Member of the U.S. House of Representatives from Maryland's 5th congressional district 1845–1847	Succeeded by Alexander Evans
