= John M. Miller (politician) =

American politician (1820–1897)

Member of the Maryland Senate from the Cecil County district
- In office 1878–1882
- Preceded by: William M. Knight
- Succeeded by: Levi R. Mearns
- In office 1868–1872
- Preceded by: Jacob Tome
- Succeeded by: William M. Knight
- In office 1868–1872
- Preceded by: Hiram McCullough
- Succeeded by: James T. McCullough

Personal details
- Born: John Milnor Miller; September 1820 near Elkton, Maryland, U.S.
- Died: February 1, 1897 (aged 76) Wilmington, Delaware, U.S.
- Resting place: Presbyterian Cemetery; Elkton, Maryland, U.S.
- Party: Democratic
- Spouse: Anna Rebecca Foard
- Children: 4
- Occupation: Politician; lawyer

John Milnor Miller (September 1820 – February 1, 1897) was an American politician from Maryland. He served as a member of the Maryland Senate, representing Cecil County in the late 19th century.

== Early life ==
John Milnor Miller was born in September 1820 at Miller's Corner near Elkton, Maryland, to Harry D. Miller. His father served as the register of wills of Cecil County. Miller read law with judge Albert Constable and was admitted to the bar on October 16, 1848.

== Career ==
Miller was a Democrat for most of his career. He was a member of the Maryland Senate, representing Cecil County, from 1852 to 1856, from 1868 to 1872 and from 1878 to 1882. In the 1851 election, he defeated Whig Edwin Wilmer. In the 1867 election, he defeated Republican Jacob Tome. In the 1877 election, he defeated Republican James T. McCullough. He was appointed as state insurance commissioner.

Miller served as secretary and treasurer of the Chesapeake and Ohio Canal Company prior to the Civil War. He also served as secretary of the Maryland Senate in the 1880s.

== Personal life ==
Miller married Anna Rebecca Foard, daughter of Samuel B. Foard. They had two sons and two daughters, Harry A., Alexander, Alice and Annette. Miller was friends with Arthur Pue Gorman.

Around 1889, Miller moved to Wilmington, Delaware, to live closer to his family. Miller died on February 1, 1897, at the home of his son in Wilmington. He was buried at the Presbyterian Cemetery in Elkton.
