= Alfred B. Cameron =

American politician (1855–1913)

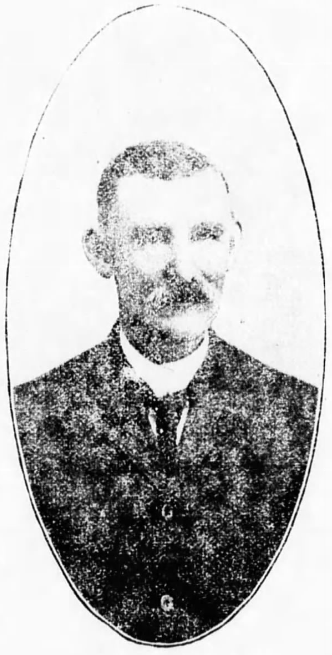
- Cameron in 1905 newspaper

Member of the Maryland House of Delegates from the Cecil County district
- In office 1906–1908 Serving with William B. Davis and W. Atwood Montgomery

Personal details
- Born: December 3, 1855 Cecil County, Maryland, U.S.
- Died: October 28, 1913 (aged 57) Bay View, Maryland, U.S.
- Resting place: Rosebank Cemetery
- Party: Republican
- Children: 1

Alfred B. Cameron (December 3, 1855 – October 28, 1913) was an American politician from Maryland. He served as a member of the Maryland House of Delegates, representing Cecil County from 1906 to 1908.

== Early life ==
Alfred B. Cameron was born on December 3, 1855, in Cecil County, Maryland, to William Cameron. Growing up, he attended public schools and worked on a farm.

== Career ==
Cameron was a Republican. He was a member of the Maryland House of Delegates, representing Cecil County, from 1906 to 1908. In 1909, Cameron ran for county commissioner, but lost to Irvin G. Griffith.

== Personal life ==
Cameron was married. He had one daughter, Margaret. In 1905, Cameron lived at his family's home near Zion.

Cameron died on October 28, 1913, at the age of 62, at his home in Bay View. He was buried at Rosebank Cemetery.
