= Johnson Simpers =

American politician (1793–1887)

Member of the Maryland House of Delegates from the Cecil County district
- In office 1837–1837 Serving with John W. Comegys, John Evans, Charles W. Parker
- Preceded by: John W. Comegys, John Henderson, John Pierson, Thomas Taylor Jr.
- Succeeded by: John W. Comegys, Samuel B. Foard, George Gillespie

Personal details
- Born: 1793
- Died: 1887 (aged 93–94)
- Party: Whig; Republican
- Spouse(s): Millicent Ford; Rachael E. Whitaker
- Children: 5
- Occupation: Politician; postmaster

Johnson Simpers (1793–1887) was an American politician from Maryland. He served as a member of the Maryland House of Delegates, representing Cecil County in 1837.

== Early life ==
Johnson Simpers was born in 1793 to John Simpers.

== Career ==
Simpers was a member of the militia and serving as postmaster at the time of the Revolutionary War. He was not in active service due to his work as postmaster.

Simpers was a Whig and later a Republican. He served as a member of the Maryland House of Delegates, representing Cecil County in 1837. He also served as county commissioner and justice of the peace.

== Personal life ==
Simpers married Millicent Ford. They had three children, including C. T. He married Rachael E. Whitaker. They had two children, John F. and Edward E. His son John was a baggage agent for the Pennsylvania Railroad and served as justice of the peace. Simpers was a member and trustee of the Methodist Episcopal Church.

Simpers died in 1887.
