= James T. McCullough =

American politician (1816–1888)

Member of the Maryland Senate from the Cecil County district
- In office 1856–1858
- Preceded by: John M. Miller
- Succeeded by: John J. Heckart

Personal details
- Born: December 1816 New Castle County, Delaware, U.S.
- Died: January 19, 1888 (aged 71)
- Resting place: Elkton Presbyterian Cemetery
- Spouse: Catherine W. Mitchell
- Children: 4, including Henry Mitchell
- Education: Delaware College
- Occupation: Politician; lawyer

James T. McCullough (December 1816 – January 19, 1888) was an American politician from Maryland. He served as a member of the Maryland Senate, representing Cecil County from 1856 to 1858.

== Early life ==
James T. McCullough was born in December 1816 at Rosedale farm in New Castle County, Delaware, to James McCullough. He was educated at Delaware College.

== Career ==
McCullough worked as a lawyer in Elkton, Maryland.

McCullough served as a member of the Maryland Senate, representing Cecil County from 1856 to 1858. He was collector of internal revenue during President Abraham Lincoln's term.

== Personal life ==
McCullough married Catherine W. Mitchell. They had two sons and two daughters, Andrew H., Henry Mitchell, Delia and Mary. His son Henry was a state senator. He was an elder of the Presbyterian Church.

McCullough died on January 19, 1888. He was buried at Elkton Presbyterian Cemetery.
