= Joseph H. Steele =

American politician (1836–1913)

Member of the Maryland House of Delegates from the Cecil County district
- In office 1880–1882 Serving with Hiram McCullough and James M. Touchstone

Personal details
- Born: December 13, 1836 Chesapeake City, Maryland, U.S.
- Died: December 14, 1913 (aged 77) Chesapeake City, Maryland, U.S.
- Resting place: Bethel Cemetery; Chesapeake City, Maryland, U.S.
- Party: Democratic
- Spouse: Caradora Bouchelle (m. 1871)
- Children: 5
- Occupation: Politician; businessman

Joseph H. Steele (December 13, 1836 – December 14, 1913) was an American politician and businessman from Maryland. He served as a member of the Maryland House of Delegates, representing Cecil County, in 1880.

== Early life ==
Joseph H. Steele was born on December 13, 1836, in Chesapeake City, Maryland, to Rebecca R. (née Sharp) and George A. Steele. His father was a farmer and a carpenter. At the age of fourteen, Steele worked as a clerk in the office of George W. Bennett.

== Career ==
Steele became a partner in Bennett's lumber and grain business. After Bennett died in 1869, Steele became the sole manager of the grain, coal, lime and phosphate business. Steele owned more than 1,000 acres (400 ha) of farming land.

Steele was appointed as postmaster of Chesapeake City by President Andrew Johnson. From 1871 to 1872, Steele served as collector of taxes in Cecil County's second district. Steele was a Democrat. He served as a member of the Maryland House of Delegates, representing Cecil County, in 1880. He also served as presidential elector.

Steele served as director of the Mutual Fire Insurance Company of Cecil County for 44 years. He served as president of the organization for fifteen years, succeeding Jacob Tome. He also served as director of the Scott Fertilizer Company.

== Personal life ==
Steele married Caradora Bouchelle, daughter of state delegate John W. Bouchelle, on January 25, 1871. They had five children, Bennett, Stanley, J. Groome, Harold and Dora B. Steele was an Episcopalian and was a vestryman of the Protestant Episcopal Church.

Steele died on December 14, 1913, at his home in Chesapeake City. He was buried at Bethel Cemetery in Chesapeake City.
