= Balderstone =

Balderstone may refer to:

== Places ==
- Balderstone, Greater Manchester, a district and an electoral ward of the wider Metropolitan Borough of Rochdale in Greater Manchester, England
  - Balderstone Technology College, a school in Balderstone, Greater Manchester
- Balderstone, Lancashire, a village and civil parish in the Ribble Valley district of Lancashire, England

== People ==
- Abel Balderstone (born 2000), Spanish professional cyclist
- Chris Balderstone (1940–2000), English professional footballer and cricketer
- Sir James Balderstone (1921–2014), Australian director of public companies

== See also ==
- Balderston (disambiguation)
- Baulderstone, Australian construction company
