= Wroth H. Manlove =

American politician (died 1985)

Member of the Maryland House of Delegates from the Cecil County district
- In office 1935–1937 Serving with William E. Briscoe and Thomas H. Reynolds
- Preceded by: Frederick H. Leffler

Personal details
- Born: Wroth H. Manlove Jr. Cecil County, Maryland, U.S.
- Died: June 23, 1985 (aged 83) near Perryville, Maryland, U.S.
- Resting place: Cecilton Zion Cemetery
- Party: Democratic
- Occupation: Politician; judge

Wroth H. Manlove Jr. (died June 23, 1985) was an American politician and judge from Maryland. He served as a member of the Maryland House of Delegates, representing Cecil County from 1935 to 1937.

== Early life ==
Worth H. Manlove Jr. was born in Cecil County, Maryland.

== Career ==
Manlove served in the U.S. Army during World War II.

Manlove was a Democrat. He served as a member of the Maryland House of Delegates, representing Cecil County from 1935 to 1937. He ran for the Democratic nomination for Maryland Senate in 1938, but lost to Cecil Clyde Squier. He served as judge in Cecil County Orphan's Court from 1978 to 1982. He also served as Cecil County assessor in Elkton.

== Personal life ==
Manlove was a member of Cecilton Zion United Methodist Church.

Manlove died on June 23, 1985, at the age of 83, at Perry Point Veterans Hospital near Perryville. He was buried at Cecilton Zion Cemetery.
