= James Thomas (Maryland politician) =

American politician (1785-1845)

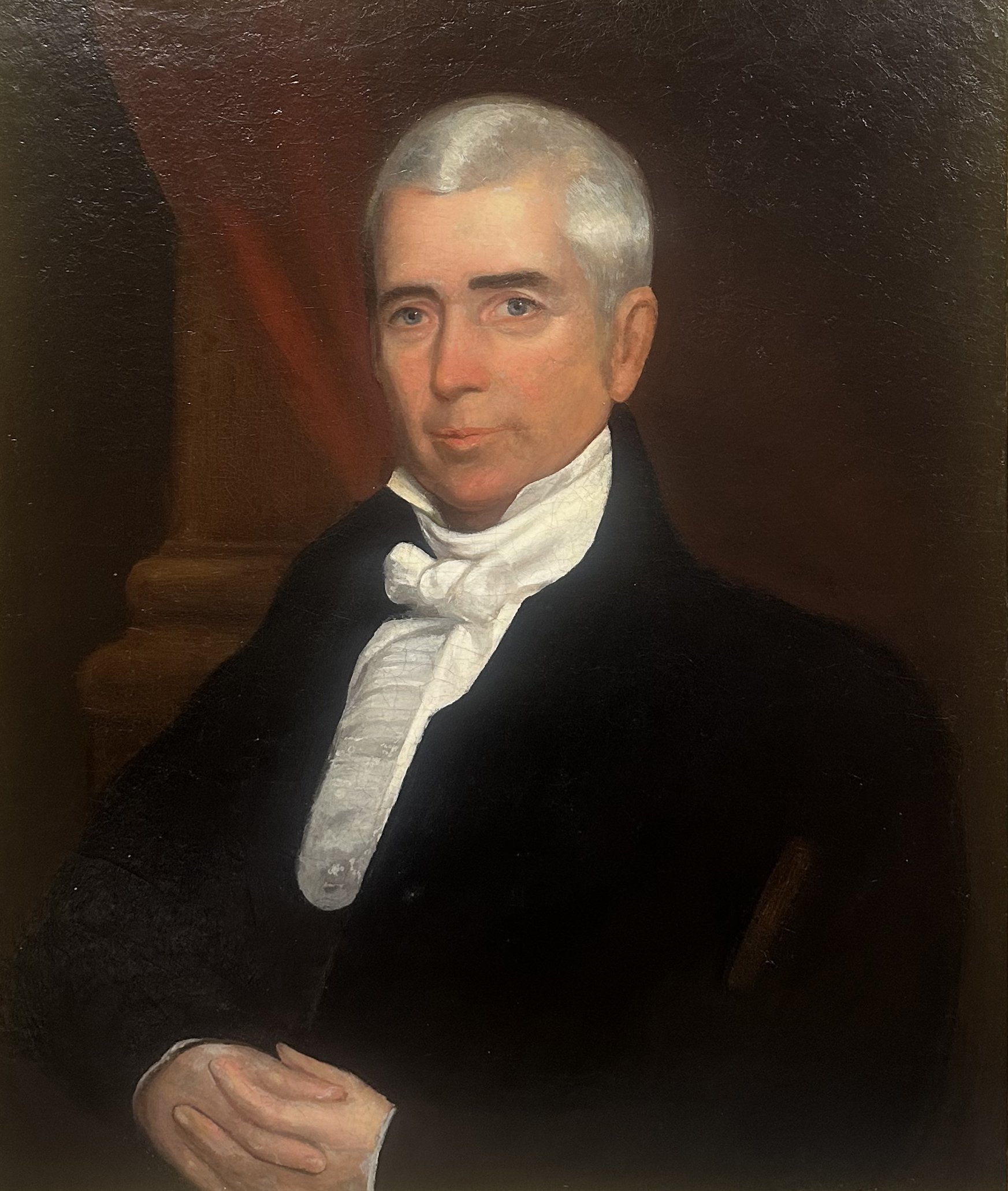
- Portrait, c. 1838

23rd Governor of Maryland
- In office January 17, 1833 – January 14, 1836
- Preceded by: George Howard
- Succeeded by: Thomas Veazey

Member of the Maryland Senate
- In office 1826-1831

Personal details
- Born: March 11, 1785 St. Mary's County, Maryland, U.S.
- Died: December 25, 1845 (aged 60) "Deep Falls," St. Mary's County, Maryland, U.S.
- Party: anti-Jacksonian
- Spouse: Elizabeth Coates
- Profession: physician

James Thomas (March 11, 1785 – December 25, 1845) served as the 23rd governor of the state of Maryland in the United States from 1833 to 1836. He practiced medicine and served as judge in several courts throughout Maryland, and served in the Maryland State Senate from 1824 to 1830.

== Biography ==
He was born at "De la Brooke Manor" in St. Mary's County, Maryland, on March 11, 1785, the son of William Thomas and Catherine Boarman. He entered St. John's College with the class of 1800, but he did not graduate. He graduated from Charlotte Hall Military Academy in 1804. Thomas studied medicine in Philadelphia and received his doctor's degree there in 1807. In 1808, he married his cousin Elizabeth Coates.

He practiced medicine in St. Mary's County until the outbreak of the War of 1812. Thomas also served as a justice of the peace and, from 1810 to 1812, was a member of the Levy Court of St. Mary's County. He was commissioned as major in the Fourth Maryland Cavalry and later brevetted a major general.

After the war, Thomas resumed his medical practice, but soon entered politics. He served as a Maryland state senator from the Western Shore from 1826 to 1831. He was elected governor by an overwhelming majority in 1833, the last anti-Jacksonian candidate to be chosen before that party became the Whigs. Thomas was sworn into office on January 17, 1833. He was instrumental in bringing about a settlement between the interests of the Chesapeake and Ohio Canal Company and the Baltimore and Ohio Railroad that meant so much to the success of the railroad. He supported appropriations for the support of general education. During his term occurred the removal of the government deposits that preceded the failure of the Bank of Maryland during 1834. Beginning on August 6, 1835, a mob began several days of rioting, burning and looting. After several days of anarchy, the Governor called for federal troops whose arrival, together with drastic action by General Samuel Smith, brought an end to several days of chaos. This incident prompted Governor Thomas to take measures for the establishment of a state militia organization.

When his term expired on January 14, 1836, he retired to his home at "Deep Falls," St. Mary's County. He died there on Christmas Day 1845, and was buried in the Thomas’ family cemetery at "Deep Falls".

Political offices
Preceded by George Howard	Governor of Maryland; 1833–1836	Succeeded by Thomas Veazey
