= Elwood Balderston =

American politician (died 1921)

Member of the Maryland House of Delegates from the Cecil County district
- In office 1916–1917 Serving with John W. Bouchelle and E. Nelson James

Personal details
- Died: November 21, 1921 (aged 64) Colora, Maryland, U.S.
- Party: Republican
- Children: 3
- Occupation: Politician

Elwood Balderston (died November 21, 1921) was an American politician from Maryland. He served as a member of the Maryland House of Delegates, representing Cecil County from 1916 to 1917.

== Early life ==
Elwood Balderston was born to Lloyd Balderston.

== Career ==
Balderston was a Republican. He was a member of the Maryland House of Delegates, representing Cecil County, from 1916 to 1917.

Elmwood served as secretary of the Cecil Farmers' Club and president of Cecil Farmers' Telephone Company. He also served as president of the Cecil County Community Council.

== Personal life ==
Balderston married. He had three sons, Mark, Lloyd and Richard. His son Mark was dean of Guilford College in North Carolina.

Balderston died on November 21, 1921, at the age of 64, at his home in Colora, Maryland.
