= Earl Davis (politician) =

American politician

Member of the Georgia House of Representatives
- In office 1969–1974

Personal details
- Born: August 24, 1934 (age 92) Stephens County, Georgia, U.S.
- Party: Republican
- Education: Georgia State University

Earl T. Davis (born August 24, 1934) is an American politician. He served as a Republican member of the Georgia House of Representatives.

== Life and career ==
Davis was born in Stephens County, Georgia. He attended Georgia State University.

Davis served in the Georgia House of Representatives from 1969 to 1974.

While a businessman in Harris County, Davis ran in a special election for the Georgia House of Representatives District 129 in 2009. He had not held office for 35 years and came in third of four candidates on the ballot.
