= Thomas Veazey =

American politician (1774-1842)

Thomas Ward Veazey
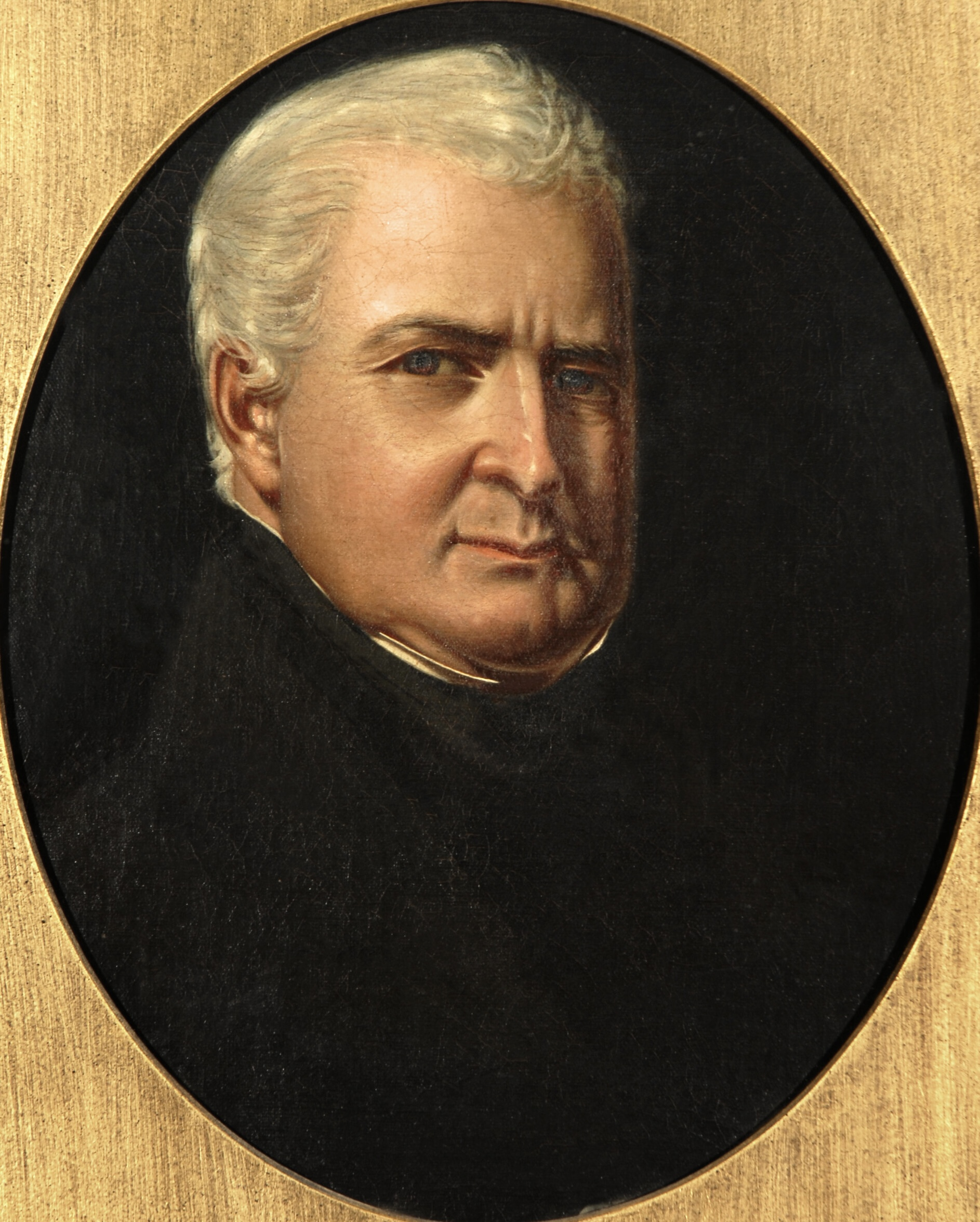
- Portrait, c. 1836

24th Governor of Maryland
- In office January 14, 1836 – January 7, 1839
- Preceded by: James Thomas
- Succeeded by: William Grason

Member of the Maryland House of Delegates from the Cecil County district
- In office 1811–1812 Serving with John Groome, John S. Maffitt, Thomas Williams
- Preceded by: John Groome, John S. Maffitt, Henry W. Physick
- Succeeded by: John R. Evans, John Frey, Samuel Hogg, William Lusby

Personal details
- Born: January 31, 1774 Cecil County, Province of Maryland, British America
- Died: July 1, 1842 (aged 68) Cecil County, Maryland, U.S.
- Party: Whig Party
- Spouses: Sarah Worrell (m. 1794; died 1795) Mary Veazey (died 1810) Mary Wallace (m. 1812)
- Children: 11
- Education: Washington College
- Profession: planter

Thomas Ward Veazey (January 31, 1774 – July 1, 1842) was a Maryland politician who served in a variety of roles. The zenith of his career was being the 24th governor of the state from 1836 to 1839, when he was selected to serve three consecutive one-year terms by the Maryland General Assembly. Veazey was the last Maryland governor to be elected in this fashion and also the last Whig Party member to serve as Maryland governor.

== Early life and family ==
Thomas Ward Veazey was born at "Cherry Grove," in Cecil County, on January 31, 1774. He was the son of Elizabeth (née DeCausey) and Edward Veazey. His father was a Cecil County planter, who served as High Sheriff of Cecil County from 1751 to 1753. His mother and father died when Thomas was young, so the governor was orphaned at an early age. He was married three times, and had a large family. He married his first wife, Sarah Worrell, of Kent County, Maryland, in 1794. She died the following year, leaving a daughter. He then married his first cousin Mary Veazey. She died in 1810, leaving a family of five children. On September 24, 1812, Veazey married Mary Wallace, daughter of George Wallace, of Elkton, by whom he was the father of five additional children. He graduated from Washington College in 1795. He was Episcopalian and was a member of St. Stephen's Church.

== Career ==
After graduating, Veazey returned home to become a planter. He was a presidential elector for James Madison in 1808 and again in 1812. He began his career in the Maryland House of Delegates, representing Cecil County from 1811 to 1812. During the War of 1812, he was in command of the forces that defended Fredericktown in Cecil County on May 4, 1812. He later served as lieutenant-colonel of the Forty-Ninth Maryland Regiment. He returned to his farm after the war, where he remained until 1833, when he was chosen as a member of the Governor's Council.

In 1835, the Whigs in the Legislature nominated Veazey as their candidate for governor to succeed James Thomas. He received 52 out of the 76 ballots cast and was sworn into office on January 14, 1836. The first impression made by the Veazey administration was favorable. His administration authorized $8 million to begin projects such as the Chesapeake and Ohio Canal as well as the Baltimore and Ohio Railroad. The money appropriated was not in the Treasury, paving the way for the reckless irresponsibility that nearly bankrupted the state.

In 1836, the Reform Convention met in Baltimore and demanded the direct election of the governor and the Senate, the elimination of the Governor's Council and the reapportionment of the House of Delegates. This act set the stage for the constitutional crisis of 1837, which his administration successfully resolved. He was re-elected on January 2, 1837, receiving 70 of the 81 votes cast. Veazey was re-elected in 1838, and received 52 of the 81 votes. The gubernatorial election in 1838 marked the last time the General Assembly was to elect a governor. After 1838, the governor would now be chosen directly by the people. The State Senate was also reorganized by awarding one senator to each county and one to Baltimore City. The people would choose them directly while both the old Senatorial Electoral College and the Governor's Council were abolished in accordance with his recommendations.

The governor vehemently and firmly believed in slavery, advocated for a general system of education throughout the state, and expressed a great deal of interest and concern over the matter of internal improvements. When his term ended in January 1839, when he was succeeded by William Grason.

During his term as governor, Veazey became embroiled in a dispute with the State of Pennsylvania over the freedom of Margaret Morgan and her free-born children who were kidnapped by slave kidnappers Edward Prigg and three other men. These men believed Margaret Morgan was the property of the late John Ashmore of Hartford County, Maryland. Veazey had to negotiate with the governor of Pennsylvania, Joseph Ritner, regarding the extradition of these slave catchers back to York County, Pennsylvania. Veazey had to obey the law, so he extradited the four slave catchers back to York, Pennsylvania. Edward Prigg and the three others stood trial for kidnapping Margaret Morgan and her children. They were tried and convicted by a jury in Pennsylvania. This state conviction was overturned by the United States Supreme Court in Prigg vs. Pennsylvania in 1842. This overturning led to all of the state laws that protected African Americans in the Northern states from kidnappings by slave catchers in enslavement to be ruled unconstitutional.

== Later years and death ==
He then retired to his Cecil County plantation, where he died on July 1, 1842. He was buried in the family cemetery at "Cherry Grove."

== Legacy ==
His home, Greenfields, was listed on the National Register of Historic Places in 1972.

Political offices
Preceded by James Thomas	Governor of Maryland; 1836–1839	Succeeded by William Grason
