= Lisa Bouchelle =

American singer-songwriter

Lisa Bouchelle is an American singer-songwriter and Americana artist. Her music encompasses acoustic rock, pop, country, and rock.

== Early career ==
Bouchelle began singing in numerous open mic nights around her hometown of Trenton, NJ, and started writing and recording her own songs. She also sang with the progressive rock band Mastermind, which was very successful in Japan and enabled her to be voted one of the top 40 vocalists in the world in a Burrn! Magazine poll.

Lisa also sang the role of Mona Lisa on the album "Leonardo: The Absolute Man," in a duet with James LaBrie of Dream Theater.

Her performances at the Jersey shore led her to be a part of charity events where she dueted with Jon Bon Jovi and sang backup for Bruce Springsteen.

== Recording career ==
Lisa recorded two solo CDs, Tricks With Pretty Words, and Passion Makes Perfect, which she pressed herself and sold at her local gigs. Her third solo CD, Paint Your Dreams was picked up by Cement Shoes Records, which was distributed by the Universal Music Group and released in 2007. The CD contained contributions from Southside Johnny, Gary U.S. Bonds, Bobby Bandiera, and Shawn Pelton, and reached No. 1 on two independent music charts, and No. 4 on the college charts. It was also selected to be part of the Starbucks Hear Music download kiosk program. Lisa supported the release with a national tour opening for Blues Traveler.

Her next CD, Bleu Room with a Red Vase, was released in 2010 on Varese Sarabande Records, which is also distributed in the US through the Universal Music Group. The CD contained a duet with John Popper, and contributions from Glen Burtnik, John Eddie, Bobby Bandiera, Rob Hyman of the Hooters, David Bromberg, Erin Hill, and Japanese guitarist Kyogi Yamamoto. To support the release, Lisa did national tours with Meat Loaf, and John Popper.

In 2013 Lisa recorded a live CD at Lakehouse Studios in Asbury Park, NJ, featuring a studio audience of fan club members. The resulting album was released locally on Trash Can Dreams Records.

Lisa also co-wrote the song "Restore The Shore" with Bill Frankel, and recorded the song with an all-star cast of New Jersey musicians, including Garry Tallent, Jerry Gaskill, Bobby Bandiera, Lorenza Ponce, John Popper, Southside Johnny, Gary US Bonds, Glen Burtnik, Winston Roye, Fiona Flanagan, John Easdale, Jay Sielgel, Steve Forbert, Christine Martucci, Ernie White, Lisa Sherman, Pat Guadagno, Corey Wager, Keith Roth, Lee Mrowicki, Scott Rednor, Stephen DeAcutis, and Hal B. Selzer. The song was mixed by Michael Barbiero, and the proceeds from the sale of the song went to Hurricane Sandy relief.

In 2016 Lisa released "Whole Lotta Highway," a fan-club only CD. The album included a remixed version of "Only The Tequila Talkin’," which was previously released on the "Bleu Room with a Red Vase" album, along with five tracks produced or co-produced in Los Angeles by Jeff Trott. The remaining tracks were produced by Stephen DeAcutis at the Sound Spa in Edison, NJ.

In 2017, three of the songs from the album, "Only The Tequila Talkin’," “Heart vs Mind," and "If You Could Read My Mind," were released on "Lipstick Tomboy," a digital only EP, along with a "Tropical Party Remix" of "Luv Is Supposed To Be Fun." The EP has garnered over two million streams on Spotify. A video for "Only The Tequila Talkin," has received over 200,000 views on YouTube. Her later video for the Gordon Lightfoot penned cover of, 'If You Could Read My Mind,' has garnered over 120,000 views.

To support the EP release, Lisa embarked on a 2018 Summer/Fall Tour which included shows with artists such as Shooter Jennings, Donavon Frankenreiter, Sam Lewis, David Luning, Benjamin Jaffe, John Popper, Don Felder of The Eagles, Steve Forbert, and Kinderhook.

In 2020, Lisa signed a deal with Sony Music's The Orchard, through Bob Frank Entertainment, for a new album, "Jump In!," which was released in the fall of 2021. The album includes guest appearances by G Love (2020 Grammy nominee), Mike Schmid (The Chainsmokers, Miley Cyrus), Tommy Kessler (Blondie), Rob Hyman (The Hooters), Joel Hoekstra (Whitesnake, Cher, TSO), Constantine Maroulis (American Idol), Hal B. Selzer (Joan Jett & The Blackhearts), Peter Mayer (Jimmy Buffett), Doyle Grisham (Kenny Rogers, George Jones, Jimmy Buffett), and Bobby Bandiera (Bon Jovi).

"Jump In!," the title track from the album of the same name, reached #21 on the Billboard Magazine Adult Contemporary Indicator chart, and the album received accolades from publications such as American Songwriter Magazine, Relix Magazine, The Aquarian Weekly, and Philadelphia Weekly, among others. Music critic Vincent Bennett of The Aquarian Weekly named it the top album of 2021 in his year-end Top Ten list, published annually in The Aquarian Weekly. Songs from the album have been used in videos that have over 4.6 million views on TikTok.

In 2022, Lisa released a Deluxe version of "Jump In!" with three bonus tracks, and also released the song "Twice As Tall" as a single. One of the bonus tracks, "Waterproof," chronicles her diagnosis of Type 1 Diabetes, and asserts her determination that her dreams are "Waterproof," and that she won't let the diagnosis hamper her journey in life. To support the release, she embarked on a 20-city tour with Glenn Tilbrook, the iconic lead singer of Squeeze.

In 2023, Lisa released the song "Love Is For The Making" as a single. The song reached the Top 20 on the Billboard A/C chart, getting to #17, and staying in the Top 30 for 4 1/2 months, an impressive feat for an indie artist. The video for "Love Is For The Making" features Lisa dancing in a blinking eye, and its creative imagery, along with the success of the song, has resulted in the video attaining over 4 million views on YouTube. Lisa promoted the single release, along with the "Jump In!" album with several shows opening for The Wallflowers. Her partially animated video for the song 'Fever,' has reached over 575,000 views on You Tube.

In 2026, Lisa released the album "Vandals, Thieves & Lovers," which included contributions from many well known names in the Americana world, including three Grammy winners. Amanda Shires added violin to four songs, while Larry Campbell contributed banjo and Mandolin, and Clay Cook from the Zac Brown Band played guitar and Hammond Organ. Other notable musicians included guitarist Waddy Wachtel, Doyle Grisham from Jimmy Buffett's Corral Reefer Band, Jake Clemons from Bruce Springsteen's E Street Band, Rich Scannella from Tonic, Hal B. Selzer and Kenny Laguna from Joan Jett & The Blackhearts, Tim Carbone from Railroad Earth, and percussionist Everett Bradley from Bon Jovi.

The album reached #74 on the Americana Music Association Album Chart, #21 on The Roots Music Report Album Chart, and the song "Make This World Stand Still (feat. Amanda Shires)" reached the Top 100 on the Mediabase Activator chart. Lisa is currently promoting the album with radio tours to Americana and Triple A radio stations across the U.S., including an appearance on the PBS syndicated show "The Woodsongs Radio Hour."

Lisa has also contributed songs to a number of charity albums, including "Serve 3: Artists Against Hunger & Poverty," put out by Hard Rock Café International, and "Inori Rebuilding Lives," a Japanese release which benefited Tsunami relief. As a studio singer, she has performed on releases by Papa Carl Anderson, Anneli Svenson, Ernie White, Frank Palmisano, The Willies, Andy Fidew of the legendary band Kinderhook, and on the soundtrack to the Broadway-bound show "Scarface."

== Rock Star Kitchen ==
In 2012 Lisa created and became the host of the syndicated TV show Rock Star Kitchen, which features a different rock star guest each week cooking their favorite dish and singing some of their hit songs with Lisa. The show aired on NBC Sports Philadelphia Plus and NBC Sports Washington Plus from Philadelphia down to Virginia. It was also seen on RCN in the Lehigh Valley, and Service Electric in northeastern Pennsylvania.

== National Releases ==
- Paint Your Dreams (Cement Shoes/Fontana/Universal)
- Bleu Room with a Red Vase (Varese Sarabande/Fontana/Universal)
- Lipstick Tomboy EP (Trash Can Dreams/INGrooves)
- Jump In! (BFD/The Orchard/Sony Music)
- Vandals, Thieves & Lovers (BFD/The Orchard/Sony Music)

=== Independent Releases ===
- Tricks With Pretty Wordz
- Passion Makes Perfect
- Live From Asbury Park
- Goin’ Home For Christmas
- Whole Lotta Highway (Fan Club Only CD)

== Other Releases ==
- Restore The Shore - Charity single to benefit victims of Hurricane Sandy, featuring Garry W. Tallent (E Street Band), Jerry Gaskill (King's X), Southside Johnny, Glen Burtnik (Styx), Gary U.S. Bonds, Bobby Bandiera (Bon Jovi), Jay Siegal (The Tokens), Hal B. Selzer (Joan Jett), Winston Roye (Soul Asylum), Steve Forbert, John Easdale (Dramarama), and many other prominent Jersey shore musicians. Mixed and co-produced by Michael Barbiero.
- Serve 3: The Hard Rock Benefit Album – Lisa contributed the track "Time (Save A Little Hope)" to the CD to benefit Harry Chapin's World Hunger Year Organization, joining artists such as Bruce Springsteen and Elvis Costello, who also contributed tracks.
- Inori Rebuilding Lives – Lisa contributed the track "Take It Out on Me" to the CD to benefit the victims of the 2011 tsunami in Japan. Lisa was invited to be a part of the project by Japanese rock star Kyoji Yamamoto.

== Stage ==
Off-Broadway:

- Mary Howling, Queen of the Crazy Ones (Nominated for Best Actress in Festival in which play was presented)
- A Little Night Music (Andrew Lloyd Webber)
- Music of The Night (Cole Porter)
- Luck Be A Lady Tonight (Frank Loesser)

== TV ==
- Gossip Girl
- Ludacris Music Video
- One On One with Steve Adubato
- The 10! Show (NBC Philadelphia)
- Good Morning Arkansas
- Positively Arkansas
- PM Buffalo
- Backstage with Barry Nolan (The Comcast Network)
- Tuned In (ABC Philadelphia)
- Beach Tennis Championship (The Tennis Channel)
- Lowcountry Live (ABC Charleston, SC)
- Music Monday (WFMZ Bethlehem, PA)
- Good Morning Detroit
