= Levi R. Mearns =

American politician (died 1896)

Member of the Maryland Senate from the Cecil County district
- In office 1882–1886
- Preceded by: John M. Miller
- Succeeded by: Clinton McCullough

Member of the Maryland House of Delegates from the Cecil County district
- In office 1872–1874 Serving with James Black Groome and Andrew J. Penington
- In office 1868–1870 Serving with John Ward Davis, William Richards, James Touchstone

Personal details
- Born: Levi Ross Mearns
- Died: January 10, 1896 (aged 71) near Zion, Maryland, U.S.
- Resting place: Rosebank Cemetery; Calvert, Maryland, U.S.
- Party: Democratic
- Spouse: Amanda F. Hilaman
- Children: 1
- Occupation: Politician

Levi Ross Mearns (died January 10, 1896) was an American politician from Maryland. He served as a member of the Maryland House of Delegates, representing Cecil County from 1868 to 1870 and from 1872 to 1874. He served as a member of the Maryland Senate from 1882 to 1886.

== Career ==
Levi Ross Mearns was a Democrat. He was a member of the Maryland House of Delegates, representing Cecil County, from 1868 to 1870 and from 1872 to 1874. He was a member of the Maryland Senate, representing Cecil County, from 1882 to 1886.

== Personal life ==
Mearns married Amanda F. Hilaman, daughter of Jacob Hilaman. They had one son, James A. He was friends with Arthur Pue Gorman.

Mearns died on January 10, 1896, at the age of 71, at his home near Zion. He was buried at Rosebank Cemetery in Calvert.
