= William B. Davis (politician) =

American politician (died 1935)

Member of the Maryland House of Delegates from the Cecil County district
- In office 1906–1908 Serving with Alfred B. Cameron and W. Atwood Montgomery

Personal details
- Born: Cecilton, Maryland, U.S.
- Died: June 22, 1935 (aged 71) near Cecilton, Maryland, U.S.
- Resting place: Forest Cemetery; Middletown, Delaware, U.S.
- Party: Democratic
- Children: 2
- Parent: John Ward Davis (father)
- Occupation: Politician; farmer

William B. Davis (died June 22, 1935) was an American politician from Maryland. He served as a member of the Maryland House of Delegates, representing Cecil County from 1906 to 1908.

== Early life ==
William B. Davis was born in Cecilton, Maryland, to Mary (née Jones) and John Ward Davis. His father was a member of the Maryland legislature.

== Career ==
Davis worked as a farmer and was a land owner in lower Cecil County.

Davis was a Democrat. In 1901, Davis was elected as county commissioner of Cecil County. He was a member of the Maryland House of Delegates, representing Cecil County, from 1906 to 1908.

Davis was a member of the board of trustees of Poor and Insane for Cecil County.

== Personal life ==
Davis was married and had two daughters, Frances Ward and Mary Ellen. He was a vestryman and member of St. Stephen's Protestant Church of Earleville.

Davis died on June 22, 1935, at the age of 71, at his home near Cecilton. He was buried at Forest Cemetery in Middletown, Delaware.
