= John W. Bouchelle (died 1937) =

American politician (died 1937)

Member of the Maryland House of Delegates from the Cecil County district
- In office 1927–1930 Serving with Arnold N. Crawford and William T. Vinsinger
- In office 1916–1917 Serving with Elwood Balderston and E. Nelson James

Personal details
- Died: May 29, 1937 near Salisbury, Maryland, U.S.
- Resting place: Bethel Cemetery; Chesapeake City, Maryland, U.S.
- Party: Democratic
- Relatives: John W. Bouchelle (grandfather)
- Occupation: Politician; farmer

John W. Bouchelle (died May 29, 1937) was an American politician and farmer from Maryland. He served as a member of the Maryland House of Delegates, representing Cecil County, from 1916 to 1917 and 1927 to 1930.

== Early life ==
John W. Bouchelle was born to Augustus J. Bouchelle, son of John W. Bouchelle. Bouchelle studied law, but did not practice.

== Career ==
Buchelle worked as a farmer. Bouchelle was a Democrat. Bouchelle served as a member of the Maryland House of Delegates, representing Cecil County, from 1916 to 1917 and 1927 to 1930.

== Personal life ==
Bouchelle did not marry. Bouchelle died on May 29, 1937, at a sanitorium near Salisbury, Maryland. He was buried at Bethel Cemetery in Chesapeake City.
