= William E. Briscoe =

American politician and farmer (died 1938)

Member of the Maryland House of Delegates from the Cecil County district
- In office 1931–1937 Serving with Frederick H. Leffler, Thomas H. Reynolds, Wroth H. Manlove

Personal details
- Born: Philadelphia, Pennsylvania, U.S.
- Died: August 18, 1938 (aged 69) Wilmington, Delaware, U.S.
- Resting place: Bethel Cemetery
- Party: Democratic
- Spouse: Ann Oakford (died 1906)
- Occupation: Politician; farmer

William E. Briscoe (died August 18, 1938) was an American politician and farmer from Maryland. He served as a member of the Maryland House of Delegates, representing Cecil County from 1931 to 1937.

== Early life ==
William E. Briscoe was born in Philadelphia, Pennsylvania.

== Career ==
Briscoe worked as the head of a department store in Philadelphia. Around 1913, Briscoe bought a farm near Town Point, Maryland, and moved there. He worked there as a farmer until his death.

Briscoe was a Democrat. He served as a member of the Maryland House of Delegates, representing Cecil County from 1931 to 1937.

He also worked as superintendent of Town Point Methodist Episcopal Sunday school.

== Personal life ==
Briscoe married twice. He married Ann Oakford. She died in 1906.

Briscoe died on August 18, 1938, aged 69, at Homeopathic Hospital in Wilmington, Delaware. He was buried at Bethel Cemetery.
