= John Ward Davis =

American politician (died 1907)

Member of the Maryland House of Delegates from the Cecil County district
- In office 1868–1870 Serving with Levi R. Mearns, William Richards, James Touchstone

Personal details
- Died: May 27, 1907 (aged 83) near Cecilton, Maryland, U.S.
- Party: Democratic
- Spouse: Mary Jones (died 1907)
- Children: 3, including William B.
- Occupation: Politician; farmer

John Ward Davis (died May 27, 1907) was an American politician and farmer from Maryland. He served as a member of the Maryland House of Delegates, representing Cecil County from 1868 to 1870.

== Career ==
John Ward Davis was a farmer and owned more than 1,000 acres in Cecil County.

Davis was a Democrat. He was a member of the Maryland House of Delegates, representing Cecil County, from 1868 to 1870.

== Personal life ==
Davis married Mary Jones, daughter of Benedict Jones. They had three sons, John Ward Jr., Edgar J. and William B. His wife died in February 1907.

Davis died on May 27, 1907, at the age of 83, at his home near Cecilton.
