= John W. Bouchelle =

American politician (1807–1898)

Member of the Maryland House of Delegates
- In office 1844

Personal details
- Born: 1807 Bohemia Manor (later Chesapeake City, Maryland), U.S.
- Died: December 13, 1898 (aged 90–91) Chesapeake City, Maryland, U.S.
- Resting place: Bethel Cemetery; Chesapeake City, Maryland, U.S.
- Party: Democratic
- Spouse: Hannah L. Bayard
- Children: 15
- Relatives: John W. Bouchelle (grandson)
- Occupation: Politician; farmer

John W. Bouchelle (1807 – December 13, 1898) was an American politician and farmer from Maryland. He served as a member of the Maryland House of Delegates, representing Cecil County, in 1844.

== Early life ==
John W. Bouchelle was born in 1807 in Bohemia Manor (later Chesapeake City, Maryland), to Alice (née Cannon) and Peter Bouchelle. His ancestor Lege de Bouchelle settled in Bohemia Manor in 1640.

== Career ==
Bouchelle was a farmer. Bouchelle was a Democrat. Bouchelle served as a member of the Maryland House of Delegates, representing Cecil County, in 1844.

== Personal life ==
Bouchelle married Hannah L. Bayard. They had fifteen children, including Caradora, Mrs. William Kaisner, Mrs. Joshua Craig, George and Augustus J. His daughter Caradora married state delegate Joseph H. Steele. His grandson was state delegate John W. Bouchelle.

Bouchelle died on December 13, 1898, at his son Augustus's home in Bohemia Manor. He was buried at Bethel Cemetery in Chesapeake City.
