= Frederick H. Leffler =

American politician and newspaperman (died 1953)

Member of the Maryland House of Delegates from the Cecil County district
- In office 1931–1933 Serving with William E. Briscoe and Thomas H. Reynolds
- In office 1918–1918 Serving with John Anderson and George A. Atkinson
- In office 1914–1914 Serving with Harvey T. Davis and Charles T. F. Mearns

Personal details
- Died: April 3, 1953 (aged 79) Elkton, Maryland, U.S.
- Resting place: Elkton Cemetery
- Party: Democratic
- Spouse: Nona E. Dean (m. 1903)
- Children: 4
- Occupation: Politician; newspaperman; bank president

Frederick H. Leffler (died April 3, 1953) was an American politician and newspaperman from Maryland. He served as a member of the Maryland House of Delegates, representing Cecil County in 1914, 1918 and from 1931 to 1933. He was the owner, manager and editor of the Cecil Democrat from 1930 to 1946.

== Early life ==
Frederick H. Leffler was born to Letitia and William Leffler. He grew up in Elkton, Maryland. Leffler first worked as a printer's apprentice as a boy.

== Career ==
Leffler worked as a printer for Cecil Whig. In 1900, Leffler transferred to the Cecil Democrat. In 1930, he became the owner, manager and editor of the Cecil Democrat. In 1946, Leffler sold Cecil Democrat to Harry Cleaves of the Cleaves Printing Company. He also worked as a correspondent for the News-Journal Company of Wilmington for 25 years.

Leffler was a Democrat. He served as a member of the Maryland House of Delegates, representing Cecil County in 1914, 1918 and from 1931 to 1933. In 1922, Leffler ran for mayor of Elkton, but lost to W. H. Mackall. In 1934, he ran for the Democratic nomination for the Maryland Senate, but lost to Harold E. Cobourn. He also ran for the Democratic nomination for the Maryland Senate in 1938, but lost to Cecil Clyde Squier. He was clerk of the Board of Election Supervisors of Cecil County.

He had a fire insurance business. He worked as the director and, at the time of his death, the president of the People's Bank of Elkton. He was a member of the Singerly Fire Company.

== Personal life ==
Leffler married Nona E. Dean on June 24, 1903. They had three daughters and one son, Mrs. Donald Rich, Mrs. Austin Crothers, Mrs. Osborne Reynolds and Frederick H. Jr.

Leffler died following a stroke on April 3, 1953, at the age of 79, at Union Hospital in Elkton. He was buried at Elkton Cemetery.
