= James Touchstone =

American politician (died 1872)

Member of the Maryland House of Delegates from the Cecil County district
- In office 1868–1870 Serving with John W. Davis, Levi R. Mearns, William Richards, George Biddle, John Owens

Personal details
- Died: December 14, 1872 (aged 56) Port Deposit, Maryland, U.S.
- Party: Democratic
- Children: James M. Touchstone
- Occupation: Politician; blacksmith

James Touchstone (died December 14, 1872) was an American politician from Maryland. He served as a member of the Maryland House of Delegates, representing Cecil County from 1868 to 1870.

== Career ==
Touchstone was a Democrat. He served as a member of the Maryland House of Delegates, representing Cecil County from 1868 to 1870.

Touchstone wrote about politics in newspapers. He worked as a blacksmith.

== Personal life ==
Touchstone lived in Port Deposit. His son was James M. Touchstone, who also served in the Maryland House of Delegates.

He died on December 14, 1872, at the age of 56, in Port Deposit.
