= William Grason =

American politician (1788-1868)

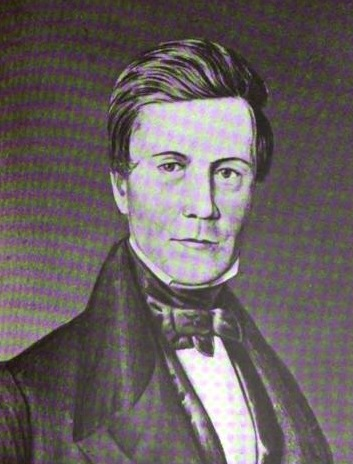

25th Governor of Maryland
- In office January 7, 1839 – January 3, 1842
- Preceded by: Thomas Veazey
- Succeeded by: Francis Thomas

Member of the Maryland State Senate
- In office 1852–1853

Member of the Maryland House of Delegates
- In office 1828–1829
- In office 1837

Personal details
- Born: March 11, 1788 Queen Anne's County, Maryland, U.S.
- Died: July 2, 1868 (aged 80) Queen Anne's County, Maryland, U.S.
- Party: Democratic

William Grason (March 11, 1788 – July 2, 1868) served as the 25th governor of the state of Maryland in the United States from 1839 to 1842. Grason also served as a member of the Maryland House of Delegates from 1828 to 1829, and as a member of the Maryland State Senate from 1852 until 1853. He was the first governor of Maryland directly elected by the general electorate and the first elected governor from the Eastern Shore of Maryland due to a system that rotated the governorship by requiring the governor come from one of three regions in sequence.

== Early life ==
William Grason is believed to have been born at 'Eagle's Nest' on the Wye River in 1786, was probably born in Queen Anne's County, Maryland. His tombstone records his date of birth as March 11, 1788. The names of both of his parents are unknown, but he is believed to be the son of Richard Grason, a farmer, also known as 'Commodore Grason.' In March 1801, he was admitted to St. John's College, but he did not graduate. He entered the United States Navy as a midshipman, but his naval career seems to have been only of short duration. On October 12, 1813, Grason married Susan Orrick Sulivane. They resided at the bride's father's residence later known as the Edmondson House a.k.a. "Liberty Hall" from their marriage in 1812 until their removal to the future governor's original home county of Queen Anne in or after 1814.

== Political career ==
He was elected as an Anti-Jacksonian candidate for a seat in the Maryland House of Delegates in 1828 and re-elected the following year. In 1831, he was chosen as a senatorial elector from the Eastern Shore. In 1833, he was considered as a candidate for the nomination as congressman, but Richard B. Carmichael was instead nominated and elected. In 1835, Grason made his second attempt to secure a seat in Congress, but in the general election he was defeated by James A. Pearce, the Whig candidate. In 1837, Grason was re-elected to the Maryland House of Delegates.

In the gubernatorial election of 1838, with candidates exclusively from the Eastern Shore District, the Democrats nominated William Grason and the Whigs named John Nevitt Steele of Dorchester County. Grason defeated Steele by a statewide margin of 311 votes. He was inaugurated on January 7, 1839. During his term he confronted the payment of Maryland's debts, primarily because the state had indulged in the all-too-lavish subsidizing of internal improvement projects, without additional taxation to pay off the debt.

His term ended on January 3, 1842, and he returned to his farm in Queen Anne's County. In 1850, the Democrats of Queen Anne's County chose him to be a delegate to the Constitutional Convention, and in the same year he was elected to the Maryland State Senate. He was defeated for election to the Maryland State Senate in 1856. Grason died at his home near Queenstown, Maryland, in Queen Anne's County on July 2, 1868, at the age of 80, and he was buried on his own land, now called 'Wye River Farm.'

Party political offices
First	Democratic nominee for Governor of Maryland; 1838	Succeeded by Francis Thomas
Political offices
Preceded by Thomas Veazey	Governor of Maryland; 1839–1842	Succeeded by Francis Thomas
