= John J. Heckart =

American politician (died 1872)

Member of the Maryland Senate from the Cecil County district
- In office 1860–1864
- Preceded by: James T. McCullough
- Succeeded by: Jacob Tome

Member of the Maryland House of Delegates from the Cecil County district
- In office 1839–1840 Serving with John C. Cameron and Samuel B. Foard

Personal details
- Died: July 3, 1872
- Occupation: Politician

John J. Heckart (died July 3, 1872) was an American politician from Maryland. He served as a member of the Maryland House of Delegates in 1839. He served as a member of the Maryland Senate, representing Cecil County, from 1860 to 1864.

== Career ==
Heckart served as a member of the Maryland House of Delegates, representing Cecil County, in 1839. Heckart served as a member of the Maryland Senate, representing Cecil County, from 1860 to 1864. In 1863, Heckart ran as a Democrat for commissioner of public works in Cecil County, but lost to Levin E. Straughn.

== Personal life ==
Heckart died on July 3, 1872.
