= James M. Touchstone =

American politician (1846–1886)

Member of the Maryland House of Delegates from the Cecil County district
- In office 1878–1880 Serving with William M. Knight, James Turner, Hiram McCullough, Joseph H. Steele

Personal details
- Born: James Monroe Touchstone; October 31, 1846 Reading, Pennsylvania, U.S.
- Died: June 7, 1886 (aged 39) Port Deposit, Maryland, U.S.
- Resting place: Hopewell Cemetery
- Party: Democratic
- Spouse: Sarah Davis
- Children: 2
- Parent: James Touchstone (father)
- Occupation: Politician

James Monroe Touchstone (October 31, 1846 – June 7, 1886) was an American politician from Maryland. He served as a member of the Maryland House of Delegates, representing Cecil County from 1878 to 1880.

== Early life ==
James Monroe Touchstone was born on October 31, 1846, in Reading, Pennsylvania, to James Touchstone. His father was a blacksmith and served in the Maryland House of Delegates. At a very young age, he moved to Port Deposit, Maryland, with his family. He studied at common schools in Cecil County.

== Career ==
After his father's death in 1872, Touchstone took over his father's iron works business. The business was renamed J. M. Touchstone & Brother.

Touchstone was a Democrat. He was a member of the Maryland House of Delegates, representing Cecil County, from 1878 to 1880.

== Personal life ==
Touchstone married Sarah Davis and had two children. He was a vestryman of St. James Protestant Episcopal Church.

Touchstone died on June 7, 1886, at his home in Port Deposit. He was buried at Hopewell Cemetery.
