= Henry M. McCullough =

American politician and lawyer (1858–1930)

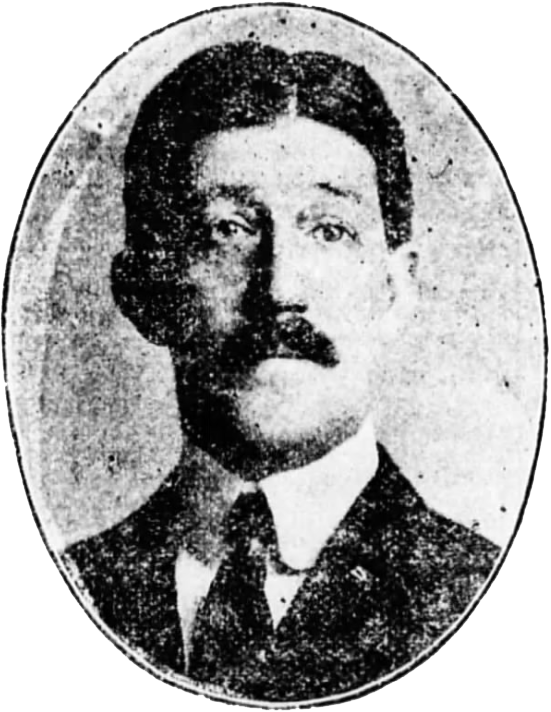
- McCullough in 1905 newspaper

Member of the Maryland Senate
- In office 1902–1906
- Preceded by: Austin L. Crothers
- Succeeded by: Joseph I. France

Personal details
- Born: Henry Mitchell McCullough; September 24, 1858 Elkton, Maryland, U.S.
- Died: February 20, 1930 (aged 71) Elkton, Maryland, U.S.
- Resting place: Bethel Cemetery; Chesapeake City, Maryland, U.S.
- Party: Republican
- Spouse: Carrie G. Brady (m. 1896)
- Parent: James T. McCullough (father)
- Education: Princeton University
- Occupation: Politician; lawyer

Henry Mitchell McCullough (September 24, 1858 – February 20, 1930) was a politician and lawyer from Maryland. He was a member of the Maryland Senate from 1902 to 1906.

== Early life ==
Henry Mitchell McCullough was born on September 24, 1858, in Elkton, Maryland, to Catherine W. (née Mitchell) and James T. McCullough. His father was a lawyer and state senator. He attended local schools and the Elkton Academy. He graduated from Princeton University in June 1879. After moving back to Elton, McCullough read law and was admitted to the bar in June 1881.

== Career ==
After getting admitted to the bar, McCullough practiced law in Elkton.

McCullough was a Republican. In 1901, McCullough was elected to the Maryland Senate, serving from 1902 to 1906. He served as a Maryland elector in the 1896 United States presidential election.

== Personal life ==
McCullough married Carrie G. Brady, daughter of H. H. Brady, of Chesapeake City, Maryland, on February 25, 1896. McCullough was a Presbyterian.

McCullough died on February 20, 1930, at his home in Elkton. He was buried at Bethel Cemetery in Chesapeake City.
