= John Charles Groome (secretary of state) =

Secretary of State of Maryland

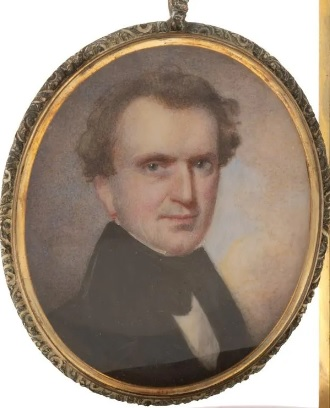

Secretary of State of Maryland
- In office 1838–1838
- Preceded by: new office
- Succeeded by: John H. Culbreth

Personal details
- Born: June 8, 1800 Elkton, Maryland, U.S.
- Died: November 30, 1866 (aged 66) Elkton, Maryland, U.S.
- Resting place: Elkton Presbyterian Cemetery
- Party: Whig; Democratic
- Spouse: Elizabeth Riddle Black (m. 1836)
- Children: 5, including James Black Groome
- Education: Princeton College; Litchfield Law School
- Occupation: Politician; lawyer

John Charles Groome (June 8, 1800 – November 30, 1866) was an American politician. He served in the Maryland Senate from 1832 to 1836. He was Secretary of State of Maryland, appointed by Governor Thomas W. Veazey in 1838.

== Early life ==
John Charles Groome was born on June 8, 1800, in Elkton, Maryland, to Elizabeth (née Black) and John Groome. His father was a medical doctor. Groome graduated from Princeton College and then studied law under E. F. Chambers and Levin Gale. He graduated from Litchfield Law School.

== Career ==
Groome practiced law in Elkton from 1825 to 1866 and taught law privately. He served in the United States Army and attained the rank of colonel.

Groome was originally a Whig and later was affiliated with the Democrats. He served as a member of the Maryland Senate, representing Eastern Shore, from 1832 to 1836. He was appointed Maryland Secretary of State by Governor Thomas W. Veazey in March 1838 and was approved by the state senate. He declined to accept the appointment in early April 1838. John H. Culbreth was then appointed to the office that same month.

In 1857, Groome ran for Governor of Maryland as a Democrat, but lost to Thomas Holliday Hicks. He was one of five vice presidents of the Maryland State Convention of February 1861 that met to discuss keeping Maryland in the Union. He was director of the Philadelphia, Wilmington and Baltimore Railroad and a trustee of the Maryland Agricultural College.

== Personal life ==
Groome married Elizabeth Riddle Black on December 6, 1836, and they had five children, James Black Groome, Maria Stokes Groome Knight, Elizabeth Black Groome Constable, Jane S. Groome Black, and John C. Groome II (1839-1860). He lived in Elkton.

Groome died on November 30, 1866, in Elkton. He was buried at the Elkton Presbyterian Cemetery.

Party political offices
Preceded by Thomas Watkins Ligon	Democratic nominee for Governor of Maryland; 1857	Succeeded by Benjamin Chew Howard
Political offices
Preceded by new office	Secretary of State of Maryland; 1838	Succeeded by John H. Culbreth
