= James Black Groome =

American politician (1838-1893)

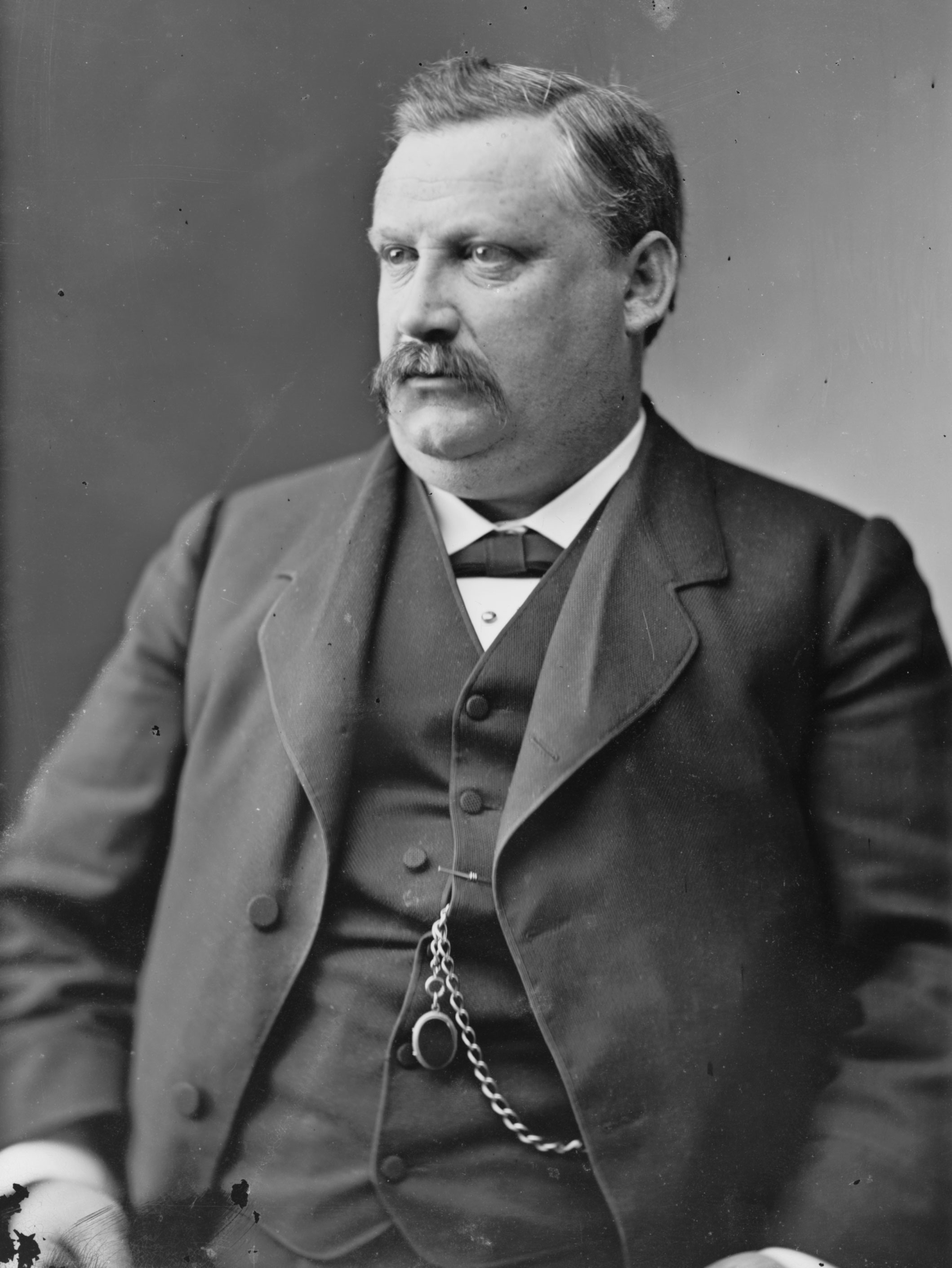

36th Governor of Maryland
- In office March 4, 1874 – January 12, 1876
- Preceded by: William Pinkney Whyte
- Succeeded by: John Lee Carroll

United States Senator from Maryland
- In office March 4, 1879 – March 4, 1885
- Preceded by: George R. Dennis
- Succeeded by: Ephraim K. Wilson

Member of the Maryland House of Delegates from the Cecil County district
- In office 1872–1876 Serving with Levi R. Mearns, Andrew J. Penington, James A. Davis, James A. Mackey, James Turner

Personal details
- Born: April 4, 1838 Elkton, Maryland, U.S.
- Died: October 5, 1893 (aged 55) Baltimore, Maryland, U.S.
- Resting place: Elkton Presbyterian Cemetery
- Party: Democratic
- Spouse: Alice L. Edmonson (m. 1876)
- Children: 1
- Parent: John Charles Groome (father)
- Relatives: John Groome (grandfather)
- National Governors Association, Governor's Information, Maryland Governor James Black Groome

James Black Groome (April 4, 1838 – October 5, 1893) an American politician who served as the 36th governor of Maryland in the United States from 1874 to 1876. He was also a member of the United States Senate from 1879 to 1885.

He was a member of the Democratic Party.

== Early life and career ==
James Black Groome was born on April 4, 1838, in Elkton, Maryland, to Elizabeth Riddle (née Black) and John Charles Groome. His father was a Maryland gubernatorial candidate and Maryland secretary of state. His grandfather John Groome was a Maryland state delegate. His maternal grandfather James R. Black of New Castle, Delaware, was a Delaware Supreme Court judge. He attended Elkton Academy. He completed preparatory studies in the Tennent School of Hartsville, Pennsylvania, with hopes of attending Princeton University. However, an injury to his eye caused him to leave school. Groome instead studied law with his father and was admitted to the bar in Elkton in 1861. Due to his ill health, Groome did not serve during the American Civil War.

In 1867, Groome was a strong voice in favor of a new constitution for the state of Maryland, and served as a representative from Cecil County, Maryland to the state constitutional convention that same year. He was elected to the Maryland House of Delegates from 1872 to 1876. At one point in 1872, Groome was considered as a candidate for the U.S. Senate by the House of Delegates. In 1874, Groome served as chairman of the judiciary committee in the House of Delegates.

== Governor of Maryland and Senator ==
In 1874, the House of Delegates elected Governor William Pinkney Whyte to the U.S. Senate, leaving the governor's seat vacant. Groome was by far the most popular candidate in the special election that was held in the House of Delegates, and was elected governor at the age of 35, receiving 62 of the 70 votes cast. As governor, Groome's administration was rather unspectacular, as many of the necessary appointments had been made by his predecessor before his resignation. Groome even commented that he felt he had no other tasks besides attending banquets and awarding prizes and diplomas. Groome did make several recommendations to the legislature during his tenure, however, including the implementation of glass ballot boxes in elections to reduce fraud, and a full re-assessment of value and property of the state.

During the gubernatorial renomination process, Groome realized his chances of being re-elected were slim, mostly due to a serious argument he was involved in prior to the nomination convention. He withdrew his candidacy, and placed support with John Lee Carroll, who would win the election. Groome resumed the practice of law for a short while afterward his withdrawal, until he was elected as a Democrat to the United States Senate, serving from March 4, 1879 to March 3, 1885. He served alongside Arthur P. Gorman and his gubernatorial predecessor William Pinkney Whyte.

== Personal life and later years ==
Groome married Alice L. Edmondson, daughter of Horace Edmondson of Talbot County on February 29, 1876. They had one daughter, Maria. In 1877, during a political canvass, a carriage accident Groome was in ruptured his heart valve. He was later diagnosed with diabetes and had an abdominal tumor.

After serving in the Senate, Groome was appointed by President Grover Cleveland as collector of customs for the port of Baltimore, Maryland, serving from February 17, 1886, to around 1890. He died following a kidney colic at his home at 2 East Preston Street in Baltimore on October 5, 1893. Groome is interred in Elkton Presbyterian Cemetery of Elkton, Maryland. A Baltimore Sun editorial commented, after his death, "few men have compassed so much in so short a time and without arousing animosities." Furthermore, Groome's local paper commented that he "was everybody’s friend ... The humblest could approach him without a sense of restraint, but none were so mighty as to feel disposed to trifle with him".

Political offices
Preceded by William Pinkney Whyte	Governor of Maryland; 1874–1876	Succeeded by John Lee Carroll
U.S. Senate
Preceded by George R. Dennis	U.S. senator (Class 3) from Maryland; 1879–1885; Served alongside: William Pinkney Whyte, Arthur P. Gorman	Succeeded by Ephraim K. Wilson
