= Evalyn France =

- Born: Evalyn Smith Nesbitt; 1855; Port Deposit, Maryland, U.S.
- Died: April 22, 1927 (aged 71–72); Baltimore, Maryland, U.S.
- Resting place: Hopewell Cemetery; Woodlawn, Maryland
- Education: Wesleyan Female College; Wilmington, Delaware
- Occupations: Banker; philanthropist
- Spouses: Jacob Tome (m. 1884; died 1898) Joseph I. France (m. 1903)

Evalyn Smith Nesbitt Tome France (1855 – April 22, 1927) was the first woman president of a national bank.

== Early life ==
Evalyn Smith Nesbitt was born in 1855 in Port Deposit, Maryland, to Henry C. Nesbitt, a merchant who owned a general store in Port Deposit and branch stores in Harford County, Maryland. In 1873, she received a degree in English literature from Wesleyan Female College in Wilmington, Delaware.

== Career ==
With her husband Jacob Tome, she co-founded the Tome School in Port Deposit. After it opened in 1894, she served as the president of the board of trustees.

She served as president of the Cecil National Bank of Port Deposit from 1898 to 1906 and of the National Bank of Elkton, Maryland, from 1898 to 1906.

== Personal life ==
She married Jacob Tome, a millionaire and philanthropist, on October 1, 1884. He died in 1898.

She married Dr. Joseph I. France, a teacher at the Tome School, on June 24, 1903. After he was elected as a U.S. senator in 1916, she helped form the Ladies of the Senate group, later called the Senate Spouses, in Washington, D.C.; she also entertained First Lady Grace Coolidge. Joseph France would run for U.S. president in 1932, after Evalyn France's death.

== Death ==
She died on April 22, 1927, from complications from an operation for a goiter at Union Memorial Hospital in Baltimore, Maryland. She was interred at Hopewell Cemetery near Woodlawn, Maryland.
