= 1916 United States Senate election in Maryland =

- November 7, 1916
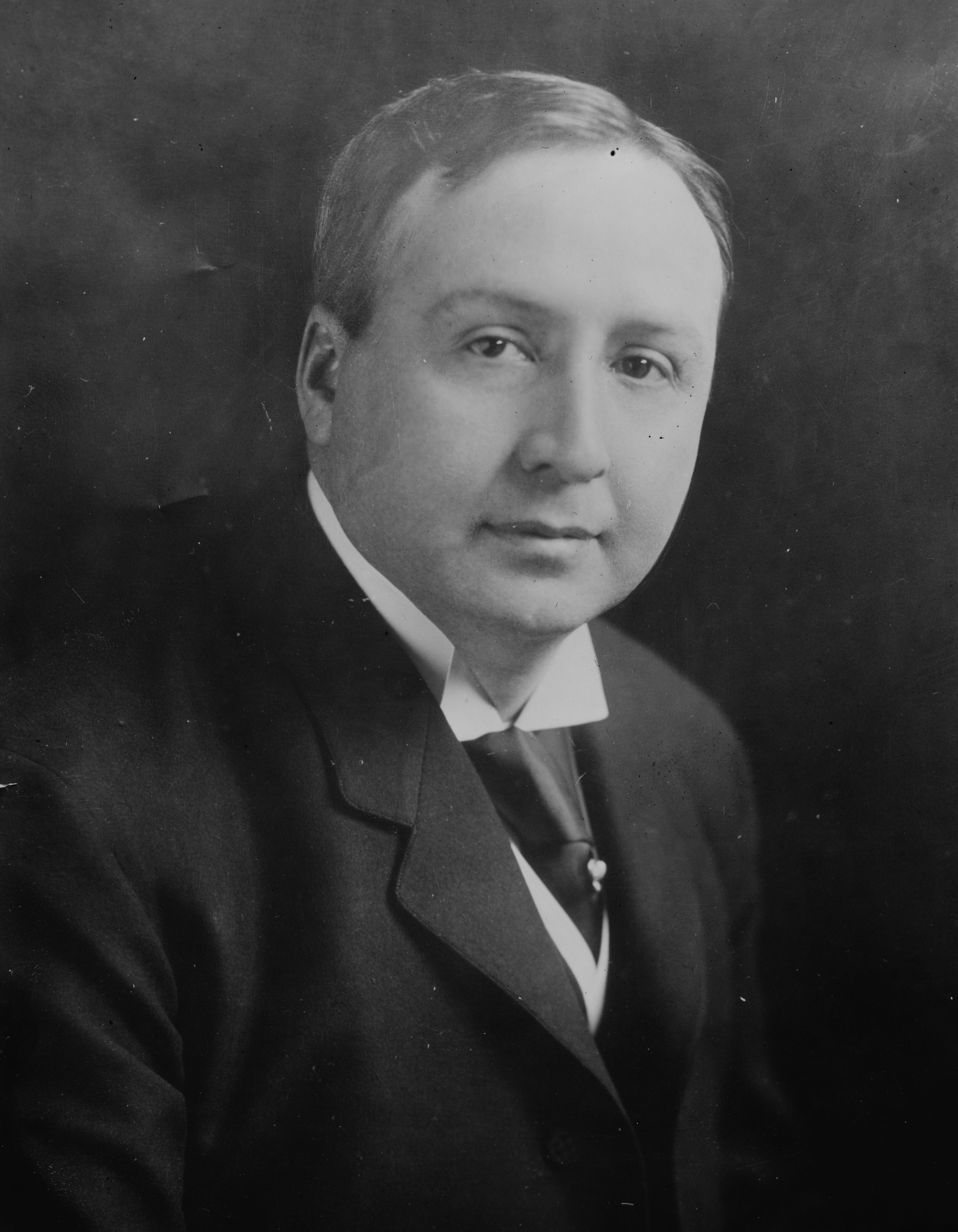

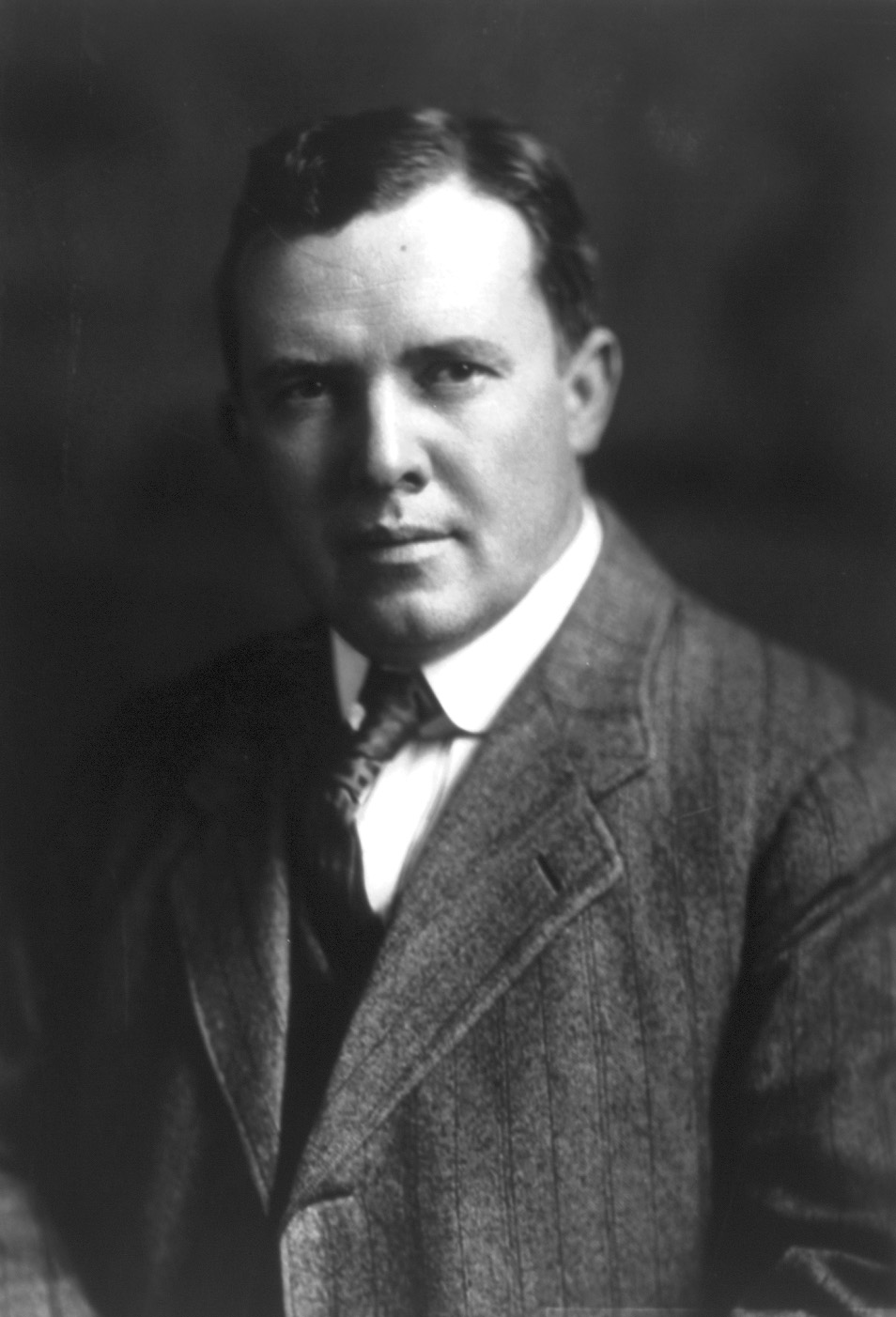
Nominee	Joseph I. France	David John Lewis
Party	Republican	Democratic
Popular vote	113,662	109,740
Percentage	49.32%	47.62%
- County results France: 40–50% 50–60% Lewis: 40–50% 50–60% 60–70%
U.S. senator before election
Blair Lee I
Democratic
Elected U.S. Senator
Joseph I. France
Republican

The 1916 United States Senate election in Maryland was held on November 7, 1916.

Incumbent Democratic Senator Blair Lee I ran for election to a full term in office, but was defeated in the Democratic primary by U.S. Representative David John Lewis. Lewis went on to lose the general election to Republican Joseph I. France, a professor of medicine and former state senator.

== Democratic primary ==
=== Candidates ===
- William Cabell Bruce, historian and former state delegate
- Blair Lee I, incumbent senator since 1913
- David John Lewis, U.S. representative from Cumberland

=== Results ===
1916 Democratic U.S. Senate primary
Party	Candidate	Votes	%
Democratic	David John Lewis	34,038	44.34%
Democratic	Blair Lee I (inc.)	34,801	45.33%
Democratic	William Cabell Bruce	7,930	10.33%
Total votes		76,769	100.00%

Lee received more raw votes than Lewis did, but Lewis received a higher share of the unit vote at the state convention.

== Republican primary ==
=== Candidates ===
- Joseph I. France, professor of medicine and former state senator
- Phillips Lee Goldsborough, governor of Maryland

=== Results ===
1916 Republican U.S. Senate primary
Party	Candidate	Votes	%
Republican	Joseph I. France	27,951	50.84%
Republican	Phillips Lee Goldsborough	27,031	49.16%
Total votes		54,982	100.00%

== General election ==
=== Results ===
1916 U.S. Senate election in Maryland
Party	Candidate	Votes	%	±%
Republican	Joseph I. France	113,662	49.32%	▲12.34
Democratic	David John Lewis	109,740	47.62%	▼9.13
Prohibition	James W. Frizzell	3,325	1.44%	▲0.23
Socialist	Sylvester L. Young	2,590	1.12%	▼0.29
Labor	Robert E. Long	1,143	0.50%	N/A
Total votes		230,460	100.00%	
Republican gain from Democratic				

=== Results by county ===
County	Joseph I. France Republican		David John Lewis Democratic		James W. Frizzell Prohibition		Sylvester L. Young Socialist		Robert E. Long Labor		Margin		Total votes cast
County	#	%	#	%	#	%	#	%	#	%	#	%	Total votes cast
Allegany	4782	44.66%	5352	49.98%	148	1.38%	375	3.50%	51	0.48%	-570	-5.32%	10708
Anne Arundel	2429	41.61%	3223	55.21%	93	1.59%	51	0.87%	42	0.72%	-794	-13.60%	5838
Baltimore (city)	51496	53.10%	42736	44.07%	1062	1.10%	1236	1.27%	445	0.46%	8760	9.03%	96975
Baltimore (county)	11697	48.72%	11532	48.04%	450	1.87%	201	0.84%	127	0.53%	165	0.69%	24007
Calvert	973	55.35%	714	40.61%	49	2.79%	10	0.57%	12	0.68%	259	14.73%	1758
Caroline	1681	48.77%	1690	49.03%	53	1.54%	14	0.41%	9	0.26%	-9	-0.26	3447
Carroll	3356	48.45%	3415	49.30%	102	1.47%	25	0.36%	29	0.42%	-59	-0.85%	6927
Cecil	2059	49.82%	2010	48.63%	39	0.94%	10	0.24%	15	0.36%	49	1.19%	4133
Charles	1349	52.63%	1092	42.61%	46	1.79%	38	1.48%	38	1.48%	257	10.03%	2563
Dorchester	2295	48.82%	2270	48.29%	102	2.17%	8	0.17%	26	0.55%	25	0.53%	4701
Frederick	5115	47.22%	5479	50.58%	129	1.19%	66	0.61%	43	0.40%	-364	-3.36%	10832
Garrett	1575	58.99%	1012	37.90%	29	1.09%	45	1.69%	9	0.34%	563	21.09%	2670
Harford	2047	39.62%	2944	56.98%	98	1.90%	30	0.58%	48	0.93%	-897	-17.36%	5167
Howard	1303	43.12%	1643	54.37%	48	1.59%	8	0.26%	20	0.66%	-340	-11.25%	3022
Kent	1617	47.10%	1757	51.18%	33	0.96%	11	0.32%	15	0.44%	-140	-4.08%	3433
Montgomery	2697	42.69%	3432	54.32%	123	1.95%	38	0.60%	28	0.44%	-735	-11.63%	6318
Prince George's	2572	47.24%	2713	49.83%	71	1.30%	42	0.77%	47	0.86%	-141	-2.59%	5445
Queen Anne's	1258	37.31%	2047	60.71%	49	1.45%	5	0.15%	13	0.39%	-789	-23.40%	3372
St. Mary's	983	43.32%	1083	47.73%	148	6.52	34	1.50%	21	0.93%	-100	-4.41%	2269
Somerset	2480	58.53%	1632	38.52%	97	2.29%	16	0.38%	12	0.28%	848	20.01	4237
Talbot	1768	44.47%	2080	52.31%	109	2.71%	5	0.13%	14	0.35%	-312	-7.85%	3976
Washington	4626	45.18%	5225	51.03%	71	0.69%	283	2.76%	34	0.33%	-599	-5.85%	10239
Wicomico	2197	42.64%	2790	54.14%	110	2.13%	34	0.66%	22	0.43%	-593	-11.51%	5153
Worcester	1307	39.93%	1869	57.10%	66	2.02%	8	0.24	23	0.70%	-562	-17.17%	3273
Total	113662	49.32%	109740	47.62%	3325	1.44%	2590	1.12%	2590	1.12%	3922	1.70%	230460

==== Counties that flipped from Democratic to Republican ====
- Baltimore (City)
- Baltimore (County)
- Cecil
- Dorchester

==== Counties that flipped from Republican to Democratic ====
- Washington

== See also ==
- 1916 United States Senate elections
- 1916 United States elections
