= Kent Curtis =

American writer (1890–1957)

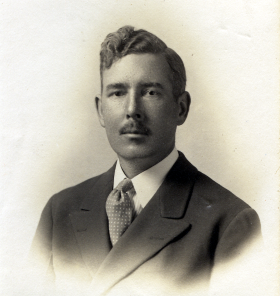
- Curtis in 1929
- Born: October 10, 1890; Wichita, Kansas, US
- Died: December 24, 1957 (aged 67); Fort Myers, Florida, US
- Burial place: Standing Rock Cemetery, Kent, Ohio, US
- Military career
- Allegiance: United States
- Branch: Royal Air Force (United Kingdom); Air Service, United States Army
- Rank: 1st Lieutenant
- Units: Royal Air Force: No. 85 Squadron RAF; Air Service, United States Army: 148th Aero Squadron
- Conflicts: World War I

Marvin Kent Curtis (October 10, 1890 – December 24, 1957) was an American aviator, novelist, illustrator, yachtsman, and teacher. Curtis served in World War I as an aviator with the Royal Air Force, was shot down, reported dead, and held prisoner of war until the war's end. Based on his war experiences, he authored The Tired Captains, a novel centered on a group of World War I pilots. Curtis was of the "Lost Generation," Americans born in the 1890s who came of age during World War I. He lived intermittently in Paris during the 1920s. Curtis published primarily boys’ adventure stories set in the places where he lived: the North Woods of Minnesota and the islands off the Florida coast.

== Early years ==
Curtis was born in Wichita, Kansas to Charles E. Curtis and Grace Emily Kent. Curtis was named for his famous great-grandfather Marvin Kent, for whom Kent, Ohio was named.

Curtis graduated in 1909 from Lake View High School (Chicago, Illinois), the year before the Kent Normal School, later Kent State University, was founded on land donated by William S. Kent, the brother of Curtis’ grandfather. Following high school, Curtis completed his college preparatory work at Tome School for Boys in Port Deposit, Maryland.

Curtis entered Amherst College in 1910 as a member of the Class of 1914. There he contributed to the Amherst Olio and served as Editor-in-Chief of the Amherst Four Leaf Clover. He left the college without graduating.

== World War I Aviator ==
Curtis joined the Royal Air Force when the US entered World War I. In 1918, Curtis’ Sopwith Camel was shot down behind enemy lines while over France. His family was notified that he had been killed in action. However, he had survived the crash and lived for nearly 40 years.

Curtis enlisted as a private in the Aviation Section, Enlisted Reserve Corps of the Army at Fort Omaha, Nebraska, on June 7, 1917. After graduation from the School of Military Aeronautics at the University of Illinois on August 25, 1917, he was ordered to Oxford, England, where he completed flight training with the British Royal Flying Corps. Curtis’ unusual behavior in machine gun class was described in War Birds: Diary of an Unknown Aviator.

Commissioned 1st Lieutenant on May 30, 1918, he was assigned to the American 148th Aero Squadron and reported for duty on the British front in France July 4, 1918. Curtis’ first attack on enemy targets was a bombing run over Croisilles, France, on August 22, 1918. From his open cockpit biplane, he dropped 4 bombs and fired 200 rounds at enemy targets. During the Second Battle of Bapaume, he undertook a similar mission over Bapaume, France, dropping 4 bombs and returning safely to base on August 23.

On Saturday, August 24, 1918, Curtis flew with his squadron leader Elliott White Springs. Curtis piloted his Sopwith Camel #B7869 off the battlefield runway at 5:50 pm on his third mission in three days, another bombing run over Bapaume. He would not return. The Camel's maximum flying time was 2½ hours. Official documents report him missing and not returned at 8:20 pm.

Elliott White Springs wrote "Kent Curtis was shot down by one of the Huns. A fine fellow he was, possessed of an excellent sense of humor, once a teacher of French and German at a Missouri college, once a guide in the northern woods, and a gentleman above reproach. His witty remarks will long ring in my ears, and he was a musician with few equals."

The Adjutant General, War Department, wired the family that Curtis had been killed in action. Cleveland newspapers carried reports of his death. In fact Curtis’ plane was shot down behind enemy lines but he survived the crash and was taken prisoner by the Germans. He remained in German prison camps until liberated December 1, 1918, nearly a month after the November 11 Armistice ending the war.

== Literary connections ==
In a letter to his sister on February 15, 1920, Curtis wrote "Good news! Tonight a check for $10 arrived as payment for a 750-word sketch accepted by the Home Sector Magazine. It is my first sale, and naturally I am much encouraged by the start." Indeed, Second-String Atrocities appeared March 13, 1920 in The Home Sector: A Weekly for the New Civilian.

It was while teaching at the Snyder Outdoor School for Boys in 1922, Curtis won second place and $1,000 in a national writing competition for his scenario "The Quinn Millions for Millions of Quinns." He was teaching French, Spanish, and history to 40 boys in a remote preparatory school on Captiva Island when George Briggs arrived with the news and with the prize.

Curtis went on to publish boys adventure stories. Three stories - The Blushing Camel, Drumbeaters Island, and the Cameleers – followed the adventures of young Alexander Brassgat living on an island off the Florida coast. These three stories were later published together as Cruises in the Sun. And he wrote one historical novel based on pilots in World War I.

Curtis was related to Hart Crane, the American poet. Though it is unclear whether Curtis and Crane ever met, they became stepbrothers when Curtis’ father, Charles E. Curtis, married Crane's mother.

Curtis was related to and corresponded with another American author and illustrator, Rockwell Kent. Kent's great-grandfather Marvin Kent was the brother of Rockwell Kent's grandfather, George Lewis Kent.

Curtis crossed the Atlantic 25 times and the Pacific once. When in Paris during the 1920s he stayed often at 21 rue Visconti in the studio of Richard and Alice Lee Myers. He knew many other artists living in Paris including Virgil Barker, Stephen Vincent Benet, F. Scott Fitzgerald, Grace Flandrau, Charles Macomb Flandrau, Sinclair Lewis, Archibald MacLeish, and Gerald and Sara Murphy.

Curtis gave Howard Vincent O'Brien the title for his book, Folding Bedouins or Adrift in a Trailer.

F. Scott Fitzgerald wrote that Curtis' The Blushing Camel was one of the best boys' books he'd ever read and compared it to books by Hemingway and Twain. Fitzgerald also wrote that Curtis' The Tired Captains "was grand, quite Conradian and tense and closely written."

Joseph Whitehill dedicated Able Baker and Others "for Kent Curtis, author of Cruises in the Sun and numerous other joyous mischief."

Curtis and philatelist Elliott Perry met on board the RMS Aquitania in 1922 on way to Cherbourg.

Curtis was a prolific correspondent. The Kent Curtis Papers held at the University of Virginia include four letters from F. Scott Fitzgerald.

== Outdoorsman ==
Curtis spent more than 30 summers in Minnesota at Camp Mishawaka. There he served as an associate director, co-owner, counselor, and entertainment director for the boys’ camp near Grand Rapids.

Curtis was known as a woodsman, cook, sailor, and an expert in canoeing; he introduced sailing to Camp Mishawaka in 1937 and had charge of it for the 20 years until he died in December 1957.

Curtis led 31 Big Canadian canoe trips through the Minnesota boundary waters. He often wintered on Captiva Island, Florida – the subject of his boys adventure stories. With the leadership of Ding Darling, Curtis helped establish an island wildlife refuge on Captiva Island and Sanibel Island. He sailed the Mississippi River often, typically from Saint Paul, MN to the Gulf of Mexico. And in 1932, he captained his sailboat Marelen II to victory in the St. Petersburg to Havana race.

== Death ==
Curtis suffered a heart attack on December 16, 1957, and died in a Fort Myers, Florida, hospital on December 24.

== Works ==
- The Story of a Flambeau Ramble (Outer's Book, June 1916)
- Second-String Atrocities (The Home Sector, March 13, 1920)
- Movies of Moose (Outers' Recreation, July 1921)
- The Quinn Millions for Millions of Quinns (Chicago Daily News, April 1922)
- No Mean City (The Cleveland Press, November 22, 1922)
- The Blushing Camel (New York: Appleton, 1927)
- Drumbeater’s Island (New York: Appleton, 1928)
- The Tired Captains (New York: Appleton, 1928)
- The Last Wanigan (New York: Coward-McCann, 1929)
- The Cameleers (American Boy Magazine, 1932)
- The Big Blow (Fort Myers News-Press, May 13, 1937)
- The Million Dollar Donax (American Boy, March–April, 1940)
- Cruises in the Sun (Chicago: Ralph Fletcher Seymour, 1950)

Source: Library of Congress Online Catalog
