= 1922 United States Senate election in Maryland =

- November 7, 1922
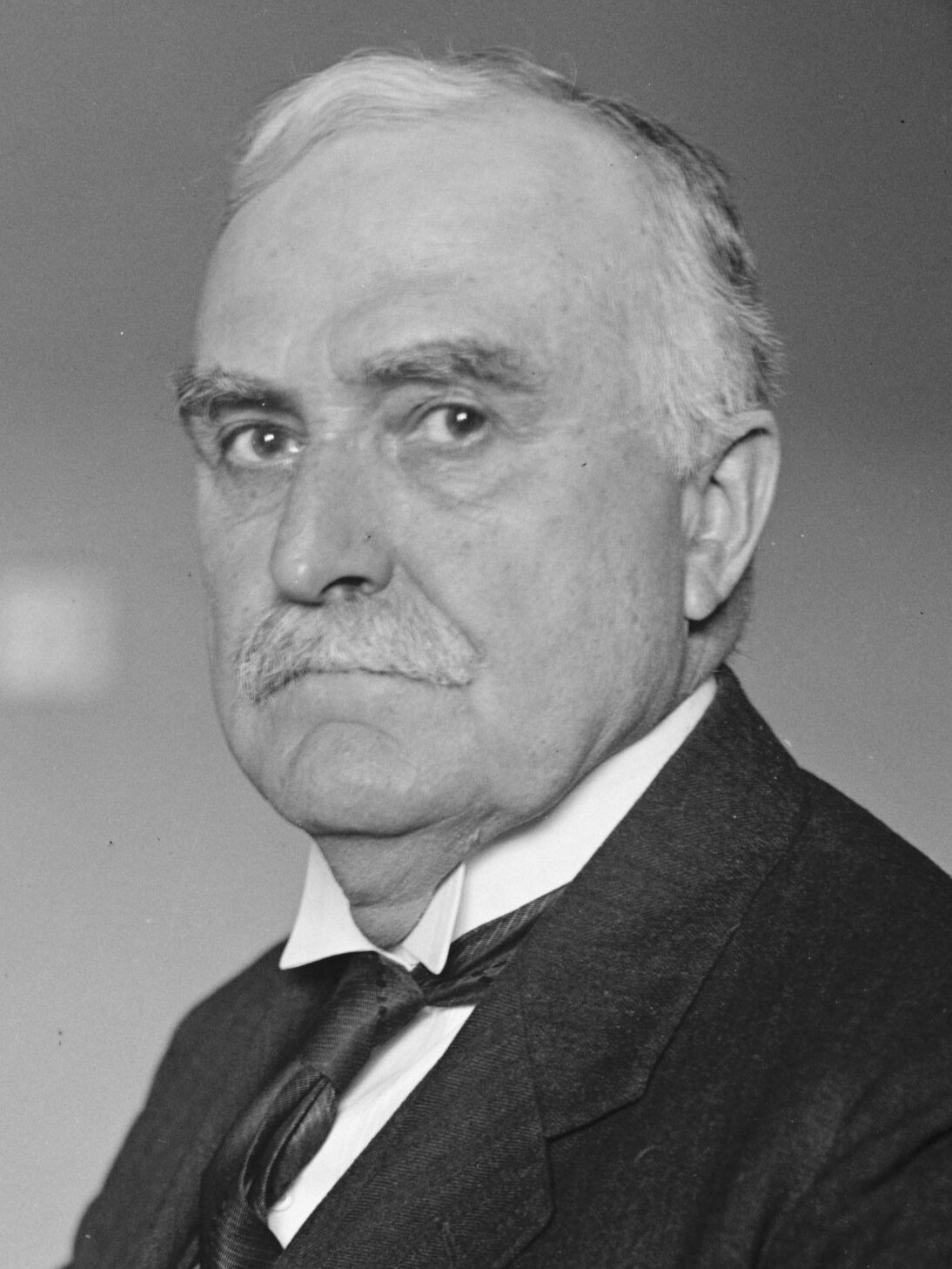

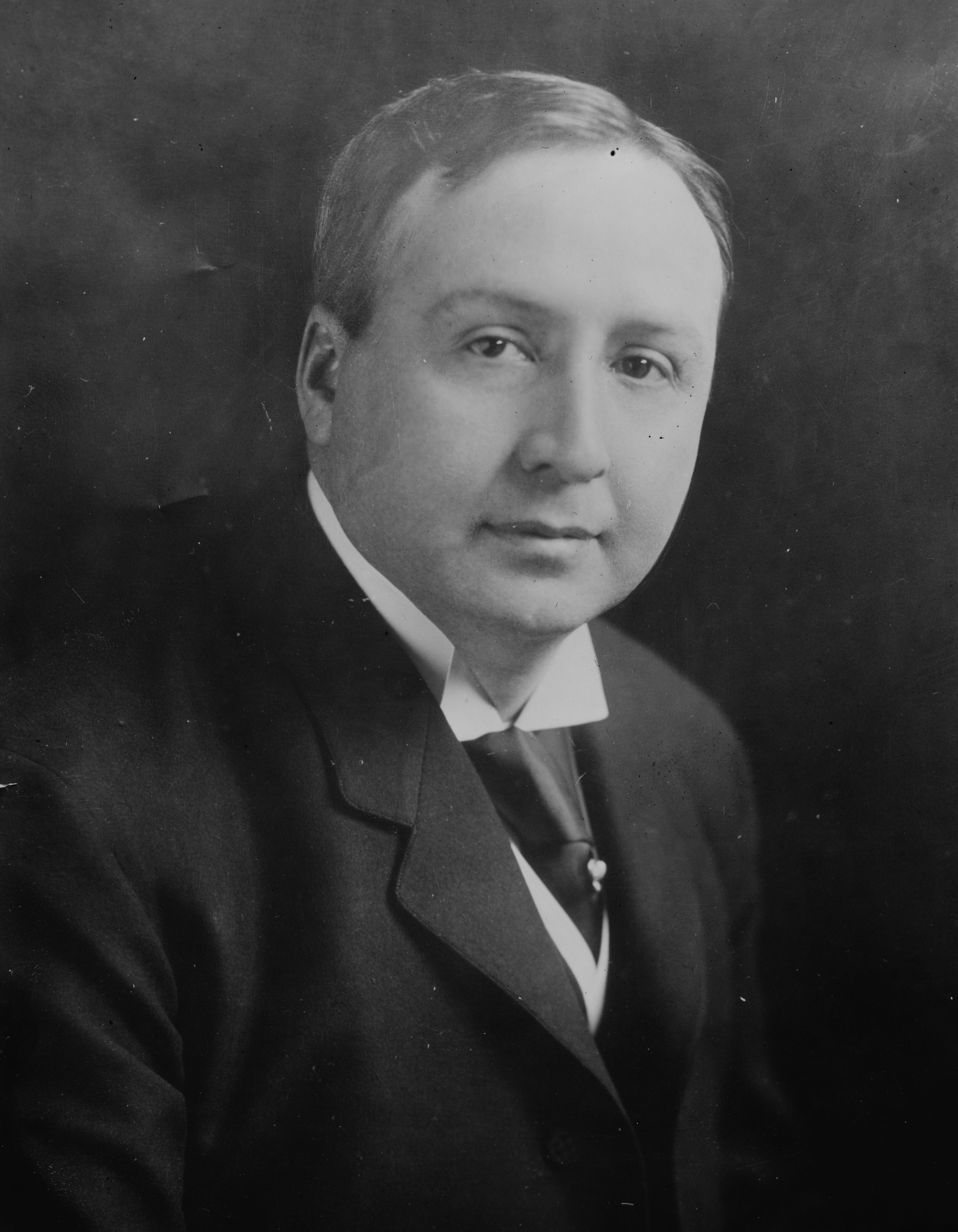
| Nominee | William Cabell Bruce | Joseph I. France |
| Party | Democratic | Republican |
| Popular vote | 160,947 | 139,581 |
| Percentage | 52.61% | 45.63% |
- County results Bruce: 50–60% 60–70% France: 40–50% 50–60%
U.S. senator before election
Joseph I. France
Republican
Elected U.S. Senator
William Cabell Bruce
Democratic

The 1922 United States Senate election in Maryland was held on November 7, 1922.

Incumbent Republican Senator Joseph I. France ran for re-election to a second term in office, but was defeated by Democrat William Cabell Bruce.

== Republican primary ==
=== Candidates ===
- Joseph I. France, incumbent Senator since 1917
- John W. Garrett, former U.S. Minister to Venezuela, Argentina, the Netherlands, and Luxembourg

=== Results ===
1922 Republican U.S. Senate primary
| Party | Candidate | Votes | % |
|---|---|---|---|
| Republican | Joseph I. France (inc.) | 38,587 | 59.15% |
| Republican | John W. Garrett | 26,648 | 40.85% |
| Total votes | | 65,235 | 100.00% |

== Democratic primary ==
=== Candidates ===
- William Cabell Bruce, Pulitzer Prize-winning historian and candidate for Senate in 1916
- David John Lewis, U.S. Representative from Cumberland and nominee for Senate in 1916
- William I. Norris

=== Results ===
1922 Republican U.S. Senate primary (Note: The source appears to indicate that this race utilized instant run-off voting. However, it is not clear from the source material how the second choice votes were applied, if at all.)
| Party | Candidate | Votes | % |
|---|---|---|---|
| Democratic | William Cabell Bruce | 41,368 | 48.15% |
| Democratic | William I. Norris | 26,261 | 30.57% |
| Democratic | David John Lewis | 18,283 | 21.28% |
| Total votes | | 85,912 | 100.00% |

== General election ==
=== Results ===
1922 U.S. Senate election in Maryland
| Party | Candidate | Votes | % | ±% |
|---|---|---|---|---|
| Democratic | William Cabell Bruce | 160,947 | 52.61% | ▲4.99 |
| Republican | Joseph I. France (inc.) | 139,581 | 45.63% | ▼3.69 |
| Labor | Robert E. Long | 2,909 | 0.95% | ▲0.45 |
| Socialist | James L. Smiley | 2,026 | 0.81% | ▼0.41 |
| Total votes | | 474,067 | 100.00% | |
| Democratic gain from Republican | | | | |

=== Results by county ===
| County | William Cabell Bruce Democratic | | Joseph I. France Republican | | James L. Smiley Socialist | | Robert E. Long Labor | | Margin | | Total Votes Cast |
| County | # | % | # | % | # | % | # | % | # | % | Total Votes Cast |
|---|---|---|---|---|---|---|---|---|---|---|---|
| Allegany | 4192 | 40.57% | 5762 | 55.77% | 186 | 1.80% | 192 | 1.86% | -1570 | -15.20% | 10332 |
| Anne Arundel | 4287 | 50.08% | 4026 | 47.03% | 182 | 2.13% | 65 | 0.76% | 261 | 3.05% | 8560 |
| Baltimore (City) | 78860 | 51.73% | 70503 | 46.25% | 1472 | 0.97% | 1619 | 1.06% | 8357 | 5.48% | 152454 |
| Baltimore (County) | 9815 | 59.53% | 6459 | 39.17% | 98 | 0.59% | 116 | 0.59% | 3356 | 20.35% | 16488 |
| Calvert | 1123 | 43.19% | 1435 | 55.19% | 13 | 0.50% | 29 | 1.12% | -312 | -12.00% | 2600 |
| Caroline | 2707 | 54.29% | 2251 | 45.15% | 11 | 0.22% | 17 | 0.34% | 456 | 9.15% | 4986 |
| Carroll | 3844 | 55.28% | 3039 | 43.70% | 36 | 0.52% | 35 | 0.50% | 805 | 11.58% | 6954 |
| Cecil | 2041 | 42.35% | 2738 | 56.82% | 10 | 0.21% | 30 | 0.62% | -697 | -14.46% | 4819 |
| Charles | 1590 | 40.30% | 2163 | 58.11% | 18 | 0.48% | 41 | 1.10% | -663 | -17.81% | 3722 |
| Dorchester | 3282 | 53.09% | 2840 | 45.94% | 29 | 0.47% | 31 | 0.50% | -442 | -7.15% | 6182 |
| Frederick | 6009 | 52.52% | 5282 | 46.17% | 40 | 0.35% | 110 | 0.96% | 727 | 6.35% | 11441 |
| Garrett | 1045 | 47.31% | 1056 | 47.80% | 50 | 2.26% | 58 | 2.63% | -11 | -0.50% | 2209 |
| Harford | 3648 | 55.27% | 2876 | 43.58% | 30 | 0.45% | 46 | 0.70% | 772 | 11.70% | 6600 |
| Howard | 2280 | 56.84% | 1655 | 41.26% | 31 | 0.77% | 45 | 1.12% | 625 | 15.58% | 4011 |
| Kent | 2609 | 55.29% | 2095 | 44.39% | 7 | 0.15% | 8 | 0.17% | 514 | 10.89% | 4719 |
| Montgomery | 5452 | 62.06% | 3254 | 37.04% | 33 | 0.38% | 46 | 0.52% | 2198 | 25.02% | 8785 |
| Prince George's | 5401 | 52.27% | 4790 | 46.36% | 49 | 0.47% | 92 | 0.89% | 611 | 5.91% | 10332 |
| Queen Anne's | 2987 | 62.37% | 1758 | 36.71% | 17 | 0.35% | 27 | 0.56% | 1229 | 25.66% | 4789 |
| St. Mary's | 1787 | 48.79% | 1819 | 49.66% | 18 | 0.49% | 39 | 1.06% | -32 | -0.87% | 3663 |
| Somerset | 2855 | 54.33% | 2362 | 44.95% | 12 | 0.23% | 26 | 0.49% | 493 | 9.38% | 5255 |
| Talbot | 3006 | 53.60% | 2570 | 45.83% | 4 | 0.07% | 28 | 0.50% | 436 | 7.77% | 5608 |
| Washington | 5296 | 56.39% | 3859 | 41.09% | 110 | 1.17% | 126 | 1.34% | 1437 | 15.30% | 9391 |
| Wicomico | 3989 | 55.93% | 3068 | 43.02% | 15 | 0.21% | 60 | 0.84% | 921 | 12.91% | 7132 |
| Worcester | 2842 | 59.29% | 1921 | 40.08% | 8 | 0.17% | 22 | 0.46% | 921 | 19.22% | 4793 |
| Total | 160415 | 52.45% | 140023 | 45.79% | 2479 | 0.81% | 2908 | 0.95% | 20392 | 6.67% | 305825 |

==== Counties that flipped from Democratic to Republican ====
- Allegany
- St. Mary's

==== Counties that flipped from Republican to Democratic ====
- Baltimore (City)
- Baltimore (County)
- Somerset County, Maryland

== See also ==
- 1922 United States Senate elections
- 1922 United States elections
