= Jacob Tome =

American politician (1810)

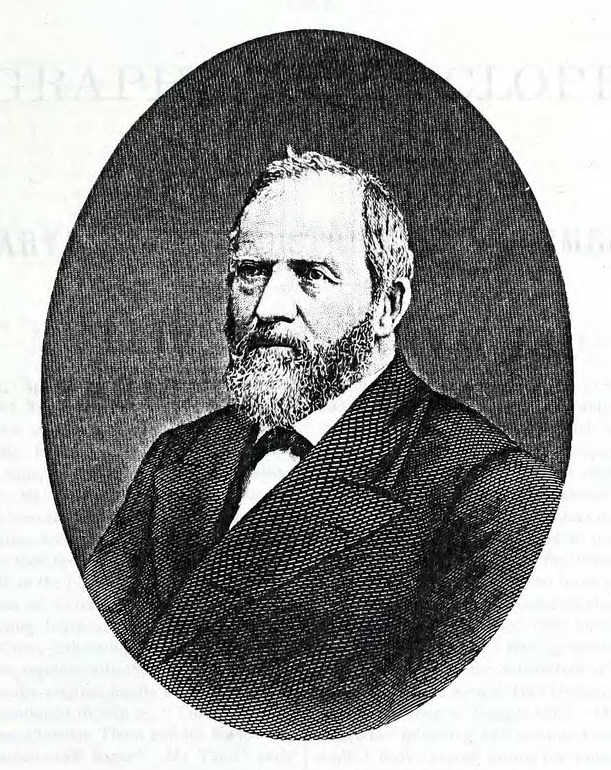
- Tome in 1879 publication

Member of the Maryland Senate from the Cecil County district
- In office 1864–1867
- Preceded by: John J. Heckart
- Succeeded by: John M. Miller

Personal details
- Born: August 13, 1810 York County, Pennsylvania, U.S.
- Died: March 16, 1898 (aged 87) Port Deposit, Maryland, U.S.
- Resting place: Hopewell Cemetery; Port Deposit, Maryland, U.S.
- Party: Union Republican
- Spouses: Caroline M. Webb (m. 1841; died 1874) Evalyn Smith Nesbitt (m. 1884)
- Children: 3
- Relatives: John Creswell (nephew)
- Occupation: Banker; businessman; philanthropist; politician; railroad executive
- Known for: founder of Tome School

Jacob Tome (August 13, 1810 – March 16, 1898) was an American banker, philanthropist, and politician who died as one of the richest men in the United States. He was the first millionaire of Cecil County, Maryland, and an accomplished philanthropist, giving money to colleges, churches, and schools, including establishing the Tome School.

== Early life ==
Jacob Tome was born on August 13, 1810, in Hanover or Manheim Township in York County, Pennsylvania, to Christina (née Badger) and Christian Thom. At the age of 16, he worked for a farmer in York County; 15 months later, he became a superintendent of fisheries on Stony Island on the Susquehanna River. In 1830, he worked for a manufacturer of tinware in Marietta, Pennsylvania, for two years, and then became a teacher in Elizabethtown, Pennsylvania.

== Career ==
=== Business career ===
In 1833, he moved to Port Deposit, Maryland, to work at Boggs' Hotel. He moved to Philadelphia for a short time to take up bookkeeping, but returned to Port Deposit in 1834.

In 1834, he and David Rinehart, a Marietta banker and lumber dealer, founded the Tome & Rinehart lumber company, which prospered and would last until 1853. In 1849, he formed a partnership with the owners of the steamboat Portsmouth and Captain Masen L. Weems to establish the Baltimore and Fredericksburg Steamboat Company. In 1855, he and John and Thomas C. Bond formed the Bond Brothers & Co. lumber company . Through Bond Brothers & Co. and his own personal accounts, he invested in timber lands in Pennsylvania, Michigan, and Wisconsin. With his nephew, J.W. Reynolds, he formed J. Tome & Co., a fertilizer and agriculture equipment company.

He served as the president of the Baltimore and Susquehanna Steamboat Company; as a director of the Conowingo Bridge Company, as a director of the Philadelphia, Wilmington and Baltimore Railroad, and as a director of the Columbia and Port Deposit Railroad. He was also a large stockholder in the Delaware Railroad Company.

=== Political career ===
He was a Union Republican and a supporter of Abraham Lincoln during the American Civil War. From 1864 to 1867, Tome represented Cecil County in the Maryland Senate. In 1865, he was elected as the chairman of the Senate finance committee. In 1871, he was nominated as the Union Republican candidate for Governor of Maryland, losing to William Pinkney Whyte.

=== Banking career ===
In 1850, Tome obtained a charter for the Cecil Bank at Port Deposit. The bank quickly grew and became a national bank. In 1868, he purchased the Elkton National Bank. In 1865, he opened a bank the National Bank in Fredericksburg, Virginia, which his nephew John Creswell became president of. He owned stock in a number of Baltimore banks and a majority stake in the Citizens' National Bank of Hagerstown, Maryland.

== Personal life ==
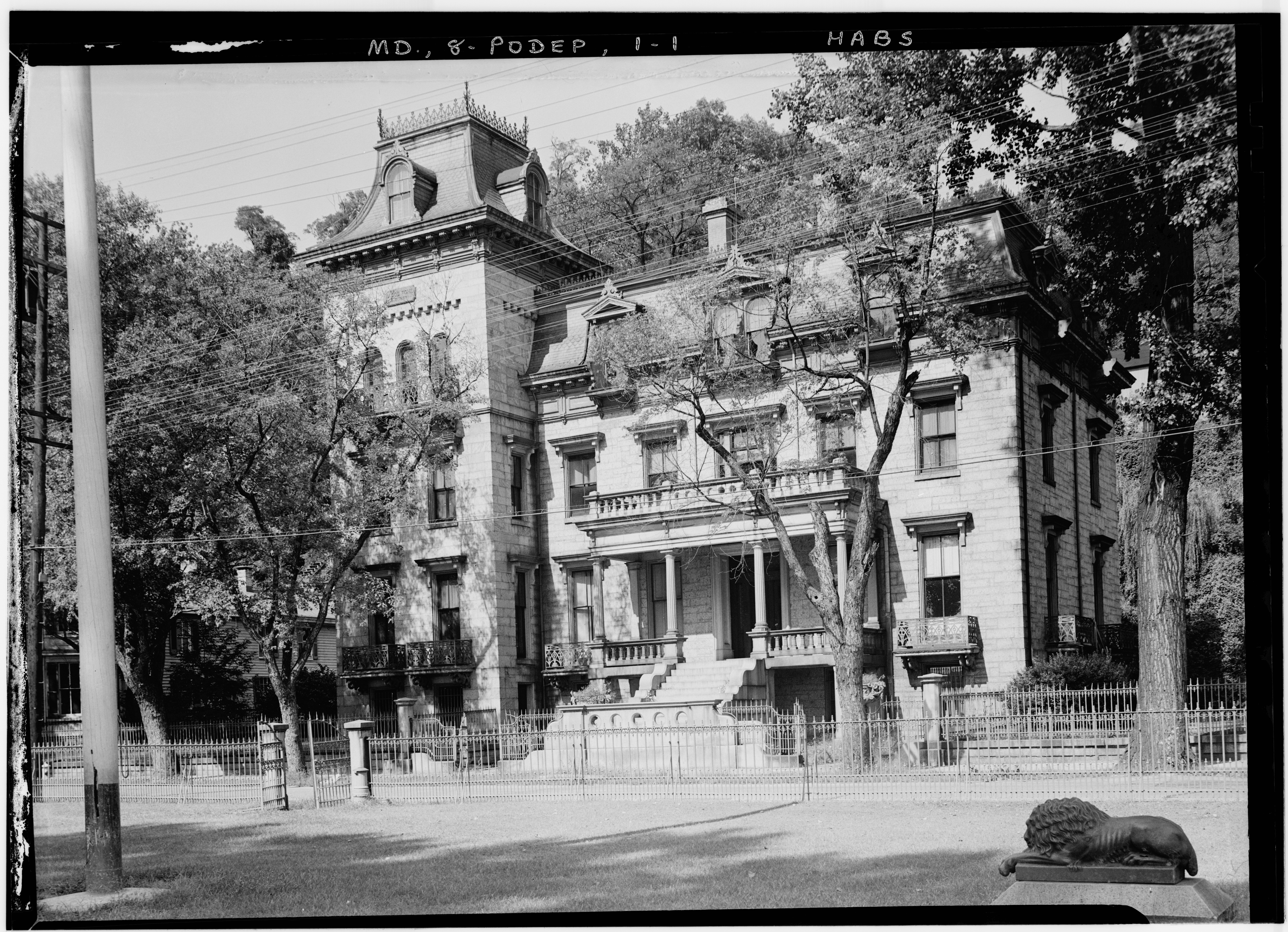
The Jacob Tome Mansion in August 1936.

About 1850, Tome erected a fine, substantial home and in the 1870s he remodeled the structure. This renovation in the grand Second Empire Style, greatly enlarged the mansion. It had a mansard roof and wrought iron balconies, along with a substantial tower, which housed Tome's bank and office. In 1948, fifty years after his death, the "palatial three-story granite block home," was razed to make way for a swimming pool operated by the Port Deposit Lions Club.

Tome married Caroline M. Webb, an aunt of John Creswell, on December 6, 1841. Together, they had three children, but they all died in infancy. She died on February 16, 1874. He married Evalyn S. Nesbitt on October 1, 1884. Evalyn Tome was the richest woman in the state of Maryland; after his death, she married Joseph Irwin France, a Senator and U.S. presidential candidate.

== Philanthropy ==
=== Tome Memorial Methodist Church ===
He built the Tome Memorial Methodist Church in Port Deposit in 1887. The church was closed on October 1, 2018.

=== Dickinson College ===
Tome was a trustee of Dickinson College in Carlisle, Pennsylvania, from 1883 to 1898. He pledged $25,000 in 1883 for the construction of its first science building, the Tome Scientific Building.

=== Jacob Tome Institute ===
The Jacob Tome Institute was incorporated in 1879, and the school was first opened for students on September 17, 1894. His wife, Evalyn Tome, served as the president of the board of trustees. In the last week of his life, Jacob Tome worked with Senators Austin Crothers and Henry Dodson to give Maryland financial supervision over the school.

== Death ==
Tome died of pneumonia on March 16, 1898, at his home in Port Deposit at the age of 87. He was buried at Hopewell Cemetery in Port Deposit. At his death, he owned about $89 million (about $3,444,300,000 today).

== Legacy ==
Maryland Route 276 in Cecil County was named the Jacob Tome Memorial Highway in his honor in 1961.

Party political offices
Preceded by Hugh Lennox Bond	Union Republican nominee for Governor of Maryland; 1871	Succeeded by James Morrison Harris
