= Frederick Nicholas Zihlman =

American politician

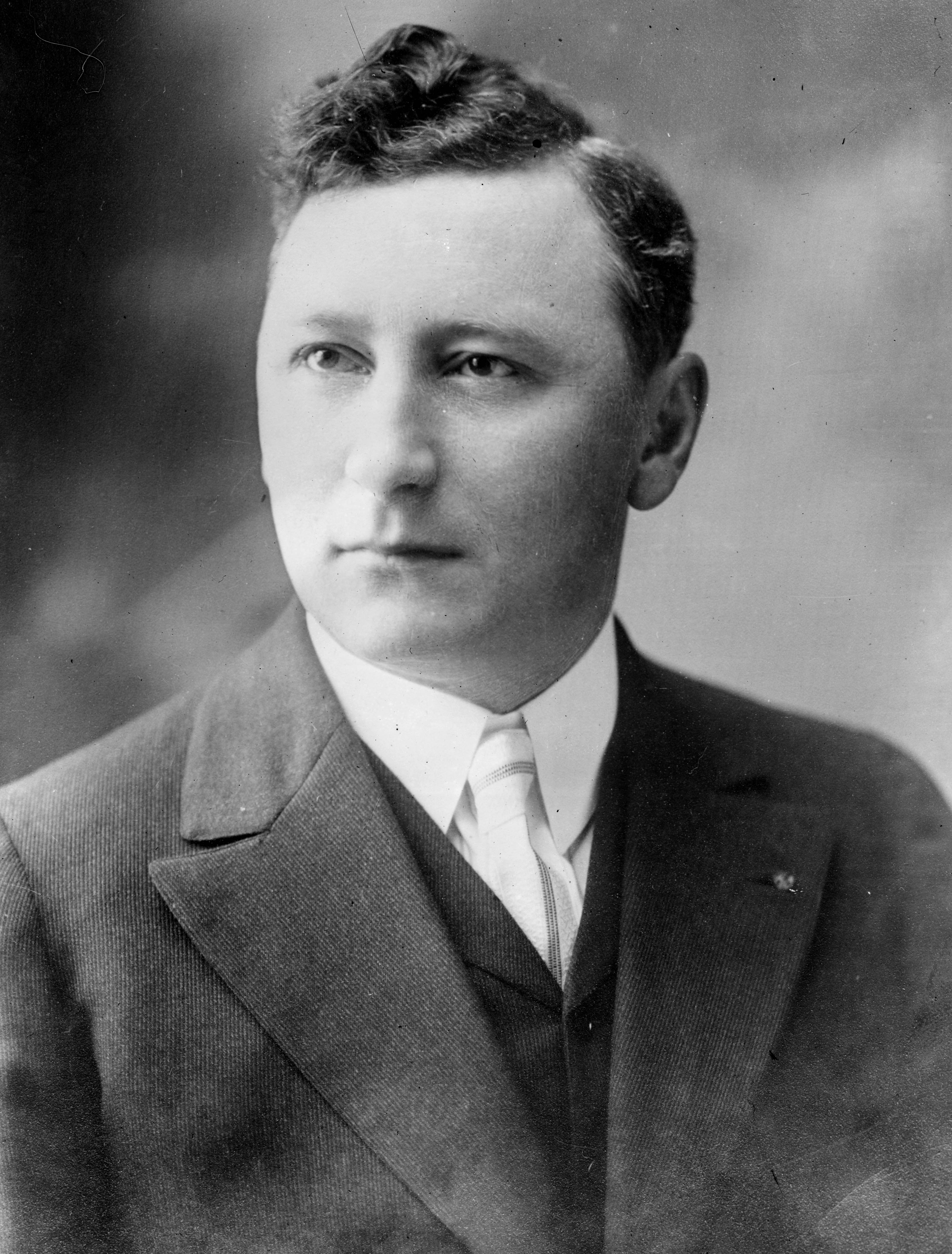

Member of the U.S. House of Representatives from Maryland's 6th district
- In office March 4, 1917 – March 3, 1931
- Preceded by: David John Lewis
- Succeeded by: David John Lewis

Member of the Maryland State Senate
- In office 1909–1917

Personal details
- Born: October 2, 1879 Carnegie, Pennsylvania, U.S.
- Died: April 22, 1935 (aged 55) Cumberland, Maryland, U.S.
- Party: Republican

Frederick Nicholas Zihlman (October 2, 1879 – April 22, 1935) was an American congressman representing Maryland's 6th congressional district from 1917 to 1931.

== Biography ==
Born in Carnegie, Allegheny County, Pennsylvania, USA, Zihlman moved to Maryland with his parents, who settled in Cumberland in 1882. He attended the public schools, and entered a glass factory in 1890 as an apprentice glass blower. He was later president of the local flint-glass workers' union from 1904 to 1909 and was a member of the national executive board in 1905 and 1906. He served as president of the Allegany Trades Council from 1904 to 1909, and as president of the Maryland State Federation of Labor in 1906 and 1907. He engaged in the real estate and insurance business in Cumberland in 1912.

== Politics ==
Zihlman served as a member of the Maryland State Senate from 1909 to 1917, serving as Republican floor leader in 1914 and 1916.

He was an unsuccessful candidate for election in 1914 to the Sixty-fourth US Congress, but was elected two years later as a Republican to the Sixty-fifth and to the six succeeding Congresses, serving from March 4, 1917, to March 3, 1931. In Congress, Zihlman was chairman of the Committee on Expenditures in the Post Office Department (Sixty-sixth and Sixty-seventh Congresses). Zihlman was the only Representative from Maryland to vote for the Dyer Anti-Lynching Bill. He was also a member of the Committee on the District of Columbia (Sixty-seventh Congress and Sixty-ninth through Seventy-first Congresses) and the Committee on Labor (Sixty-seventh and Sixty-eighth Congresses).

Zihlman was accused of corruption and bribery in 1929. When the inquiry produced no evidence, he was acquitted. He was an unsuccessful candidate for reelection in 1930 and again in 1934 to the Seventy-fourth Congress.

After his tenure in Congress, he resumed his former business pursuits in Cumberland, until his death there. He is interred in St. John's Cemetery in Forest Glen, Maryland.

U.S. House of Representatives
| Preceded by David John Lewis | Representative of the 6th Congressional District of Maryland; 1917–1931 | Succeeded by David John Lewis |
