= William Cabell Bruce =

American politician (1860–1946)

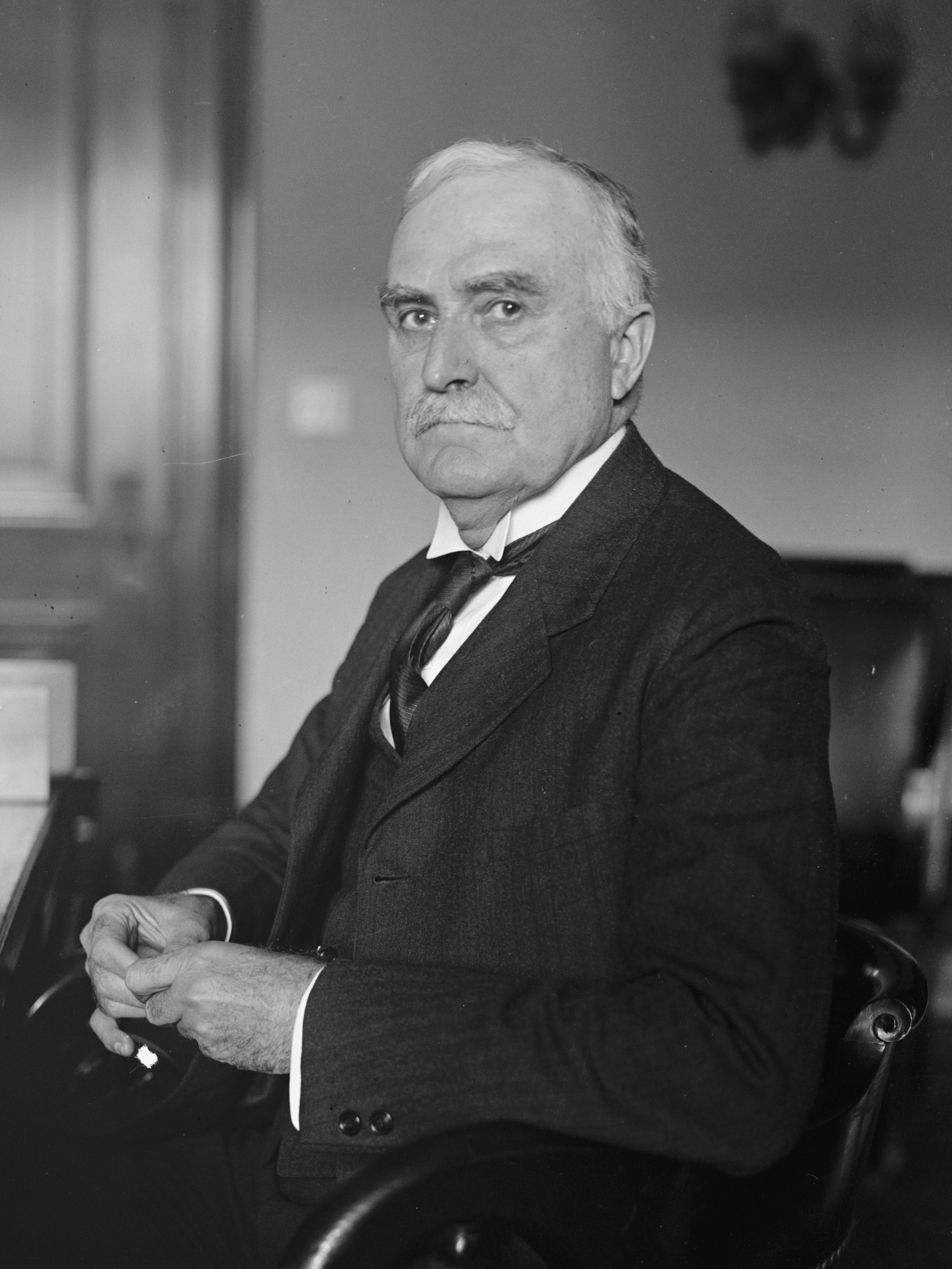

United States Senator from Maryland
- In office March 4, 1923 – March 4, 1929
- Preceded by: Joseph I. France
- Succeeded by: Phillips L. Goldsborough

Member of the Maryland Senate
- In office 1894-1896

Personal details
- Born: March 12, 1860 Staunton Hill, Charlotte County, Virginia, U.S.
- Died: May 9, 1946 (aged 86) Ruxton, Maryland, U.S.
- Party: Democratic
- Spouse: Louise Este Fisher (m. 1887)
- Children: 4 sons

William Cabell Bruce (March 12, 1860 – May 9, 1946) was an American lawyer, politician and Pulitzer Prize-winning writer who represented the State of Maryland in the United States Senate from 1923 to 1929.

== Background ==
Bruce was born at Staunton Hill in Charlotte County, Virginia to Charles Bruce (who had served in the Virginia state senate before the American Civil War) and his wife, the former Sarah Alexander Seddon (a sister of James Seddon). Educated at Norwood High School and College in Nelson County, Virginia, Bruce later attended the University of Virginia where he bested Woodrow Wilson in both a highly contested formal debate and an essay competition. In 1882, Bruce graduated from the University of Maryland School of Law.

== Career ==
Bruce was admitted to the Maryland bar the same year and began his legal career in Baltimore, Maryland which included administrative and political positions.

Bruce began his political career in the Maryland Senate, serving from 1894 to 1896, and was appointed as president of the Senate in 1896. He served as head of the city law department of Baltimore from 1903 to 1908; as a member of the Baltimore Charter Commission in 1910; and as general counsel to the Maryland Public Service Commission from 1910 to 1922, at which time he resigned to become a U.S. Senator as described below.

Bruce unsuccessfully campaigned for the Democratic nomination for United States Senator in 1916, but succeeded not only in the primary but in the general election six years later in the election of 1922. However, Republican Phillips Lee Goldsborough defeated Bruce in the next election in 1928. Bruce resumed the practice of law in Baltimore until 1937, when he retired.

As listed below, Bruce also wrote books, both fiction and non-fiction. He received a Pulitzer Prize in 1918 for his book Benjamin Franklin, Self-Revealed

== Personal and death ==
Bruce married Louise Este Fisher on October 15, 1887. They had four sons, William Fisher Bruce, James Cabell Bruce, William Cabell Bruce, and David K. E. Bruce.

He died in Ruxton, Maryland, on May 9, 1946. He is buried at St. Thomas' Episcopal Church Cemetery in Garrison, Maryland. The Library of Congress holds his papers in its Manuscripts Division.

== Select works ==
- Benjamin Franklin, Self-Revealed: A Biographical Sketch and Critical Study Based Mainly on His Own Writings; New York, London: G. P. Putnam's Sons, 1917. (Available online: Vol. I, Vol. II.)
- Below the James: A Plantation Sketch; New York: The Neale Publishing Company, 1918. (Available online.)
- John Randolph of Roanoke, 1773–1833; A Biography Based Largely on New Material, in 2 volumes; New York, London: G. P. Putnam's Sons, 1922. (Available online: Vol. I, Vol. II.)
- Imaginary Conversations with Franklin, G. P. Putnam's Sons, 1933.
- Recollections: and, The Inn of Existence, 1936.
- The Negro problem at the Internet Archive (1891)

== See also ==
- James Cabell Bruce
- David K. E. Bruce

Party political offices
Preceded by David John Lewis	Democratic nominee for U.S. Senator from Maryland (Class 1); 1922, 1928	Succeeded by George L. P. Radcliffe
Political offices
Preceded by John Walter Smith	President of the Maryland State Senate; 1896	Succeeded by John Wirt Randall
U.S. Senate
Preceded by Joseph Irwin France	U.S. senator (Class 1) from Maryland; 1923–1929; Served alongside: Ovington Weller, Millard Tydings	Succeeded by Phillips Lee Goldsborough
