= David John Lewis =

American politician (1869–1952)

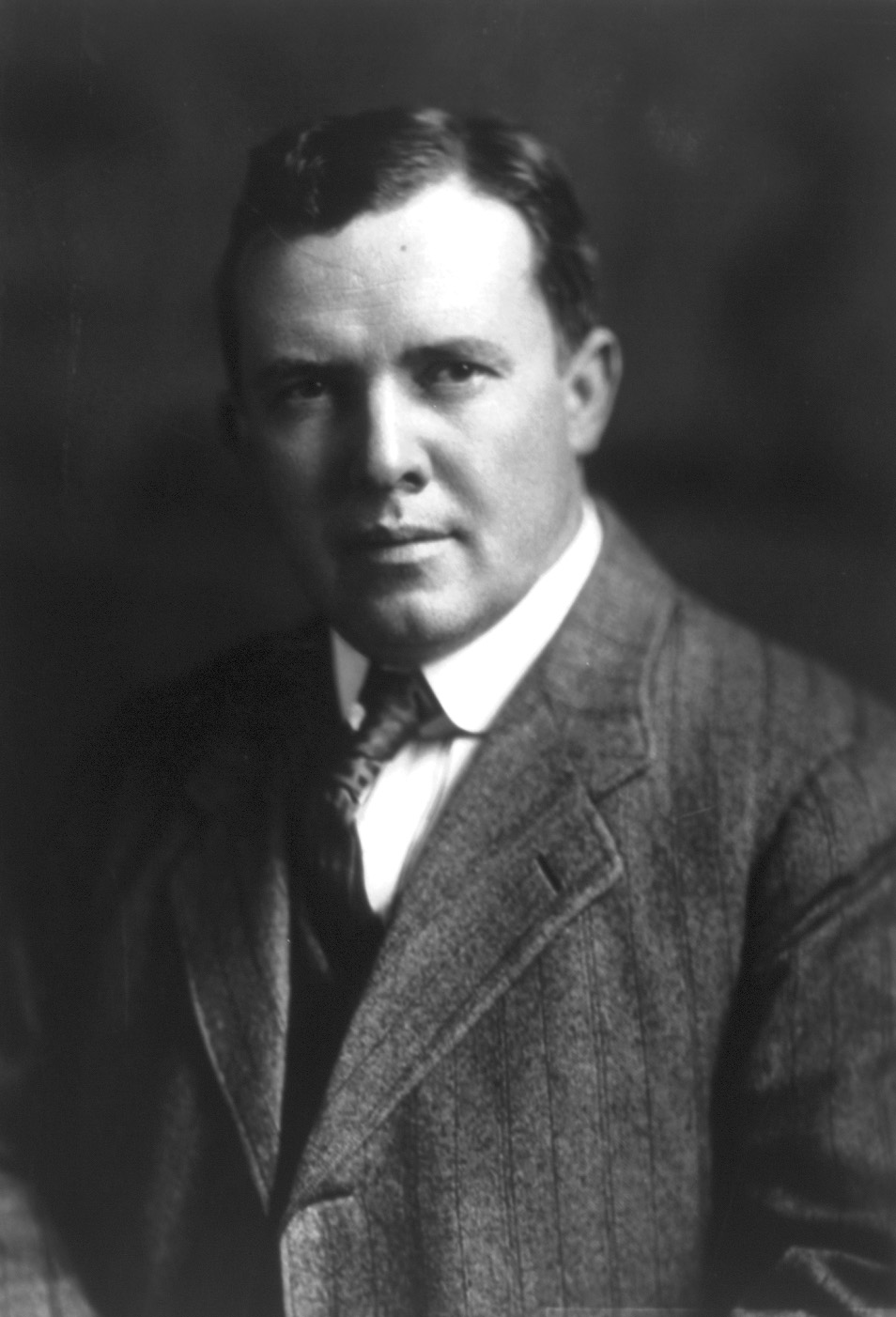
- Lewis (c. 1911)

Member of the U.S. House of Representatives from Maryland's 6th district
- In office March 4, 1931 – January 3, 1939
- Preceded by: Frederick Nicholas Zihlman
- Succeeded by: William Devereux Byron
- In office March 4, 1911 – March 3, 1917
- Preceded by: George Alexander Pearre
- Succeeded by: Frederick Nicholas Zihlman

Personal details
- Born: May 1, 1869 Nutals Bank, Centre County, Pennsylvania, U.S.
- Died: August 12, 1952 (aged 83) Cumberland, Maryland, U.S.
- Resting place: Hill Crest Cemetery
- Party: Democratic
- Known for: Introducing the Social Security Act to the House Of Representatives
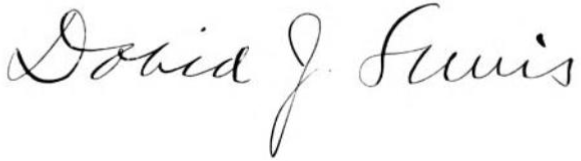
- Signature

David John Lewis (May 1, 1869 – August 12, 1952) was an American politician from Maryland, serving in the Maryland State Senate and the United States House of Representatives.

== Early life ==
Born near Osceola Mills, Centre County, Pennsylvania, to Welsh immigrants, Lewis worked in the local coal mines from 1878 to 1892. He studied law and Latin in his spare time, was admitted to the bar in 1892, and commenced practice in Cumberland, Maryland.

== Political career ==
Lewis served as a member of the Maryland State Senate from 1902 to 1906, and was an unsuccessful Democratic candidate for election to the Sixty-first Congress in 1908. In 1910, he was elected as a Democrat to the Sixty-second, Sixty-third, and Sixty-fourth Congresses, serving the sixth district of Maryland from March 4, 1911, to March 3, 1917. During the Sixty-third and Sixty-fourth Congresses, he served as chairman of the House Committee on Labor. He was not a candidate for renomination in 1916, but was an unsuccessful Democratic candidate for election to the United States Senate.

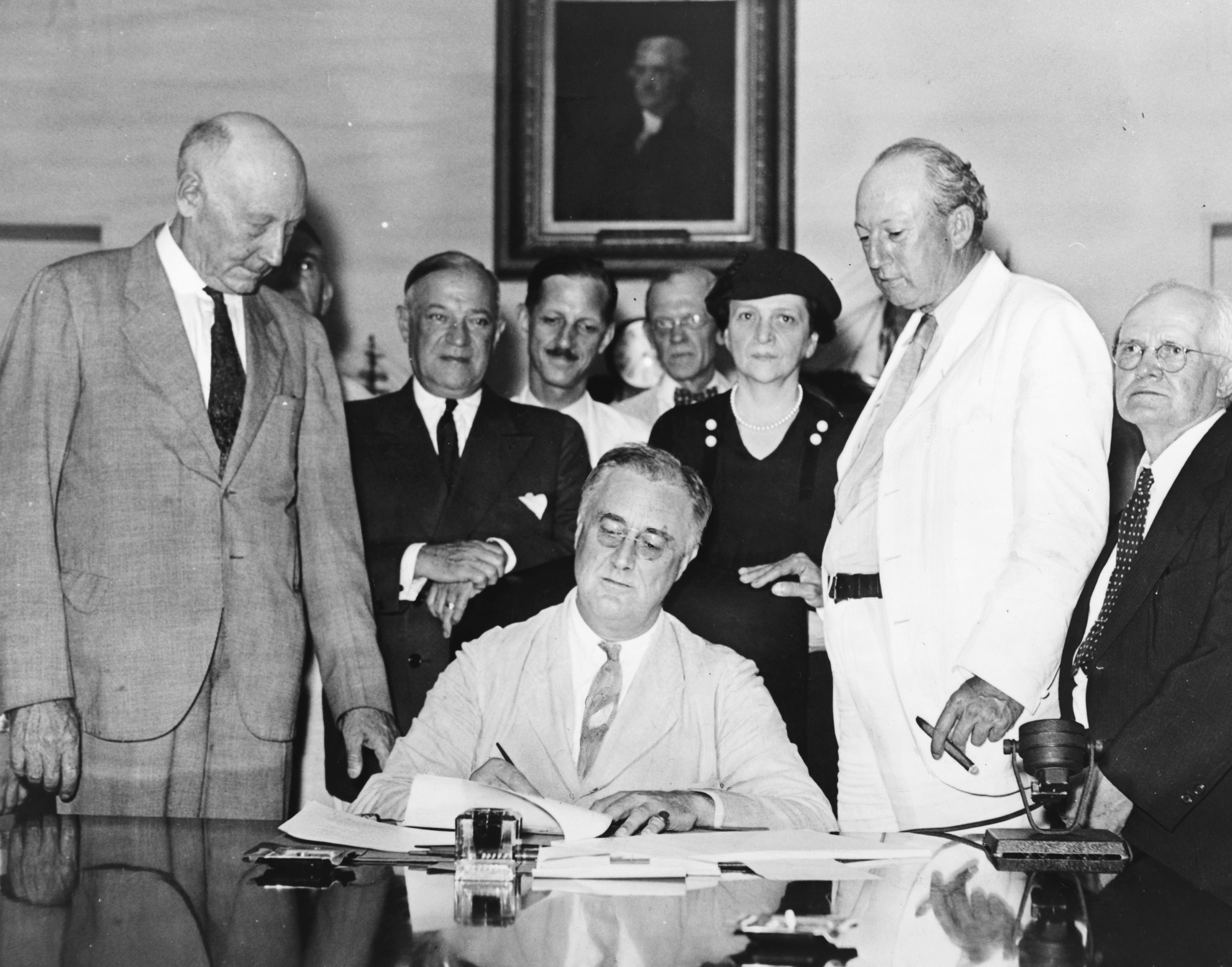
President Roosevelt signs the Social Security Act into law, August 14, 1935. (Lewis at far right)

From April 1917 to March 1925, Lewis was a member of the United States Tariff Commission. He was again an unsuccessful candidate for the Democratic nomination for the United States Senate in 1922, and resumed the practice of law in Cumberland. He was again elected to the Seventy-second and to the three succeeding Congresses, serving the sixth district of Maryland from March 4, 1931, to January 3, 1939, but was not a candidate for renomination in 1938, having run for senator, challenging incumbent Millard Tydings in the Democratic primary. Lewis was more sympathetic to the New Deal than Tydings and won the backing of President Franklin D. Roosevelt. Nevertheless, his third bid for the Senate was again unsuccessful, and instead he served as a member of the National Mediation Board from 1939 to 1943. He died in Cumberland on August 12, 1952, and is interred in Hillcrest Cemetery.

== Social Security Act ==
David John Lewis was the leading expert on social insurance legislation on the House Ways & Means Committee. He introduced the Social Security bill into the House on January 17, 1935. However, Chairman Doughton, exercising what he took to be the Chairman's privileges, made a copy of Lewis' bill and submitted it himself. Then he persuaded the House clerk to give him a lower number than Lewis' copy. Newspapers then began calling the bill "The Wagner-Doughton bill." When Lewis found out, he sputtered and swore, then went to work to understand every sentence and master the arguments in favor of the bill. And when David Lewis walked down the aisle of the House to debate on the bill's behalf, he received a standing ovation.

Party political offices
Preceded by Blair Lee I	Democratic nominee for U.S. Senator from Maryland (Class 1); 1916	Succeeded by William Cabell Bruce
U.S. House of Representatives
Preceded by George Alexander Pearre	Representative of the 6th Congressional District of Maryland; 1911–1917	Succeeded by Frederick Nicholas Zihlman
Preceded by Frederick Nicholas Zihlman	Representative of the 6th Congressional District of Maryland; 1931–1939	Succeeded by William Devereux Byron
