= Tome School =

School in North East, Maryland, US

- Tome School for Boys Historic District
- U.S. National Register of Historic Places
- U.S. Historic district
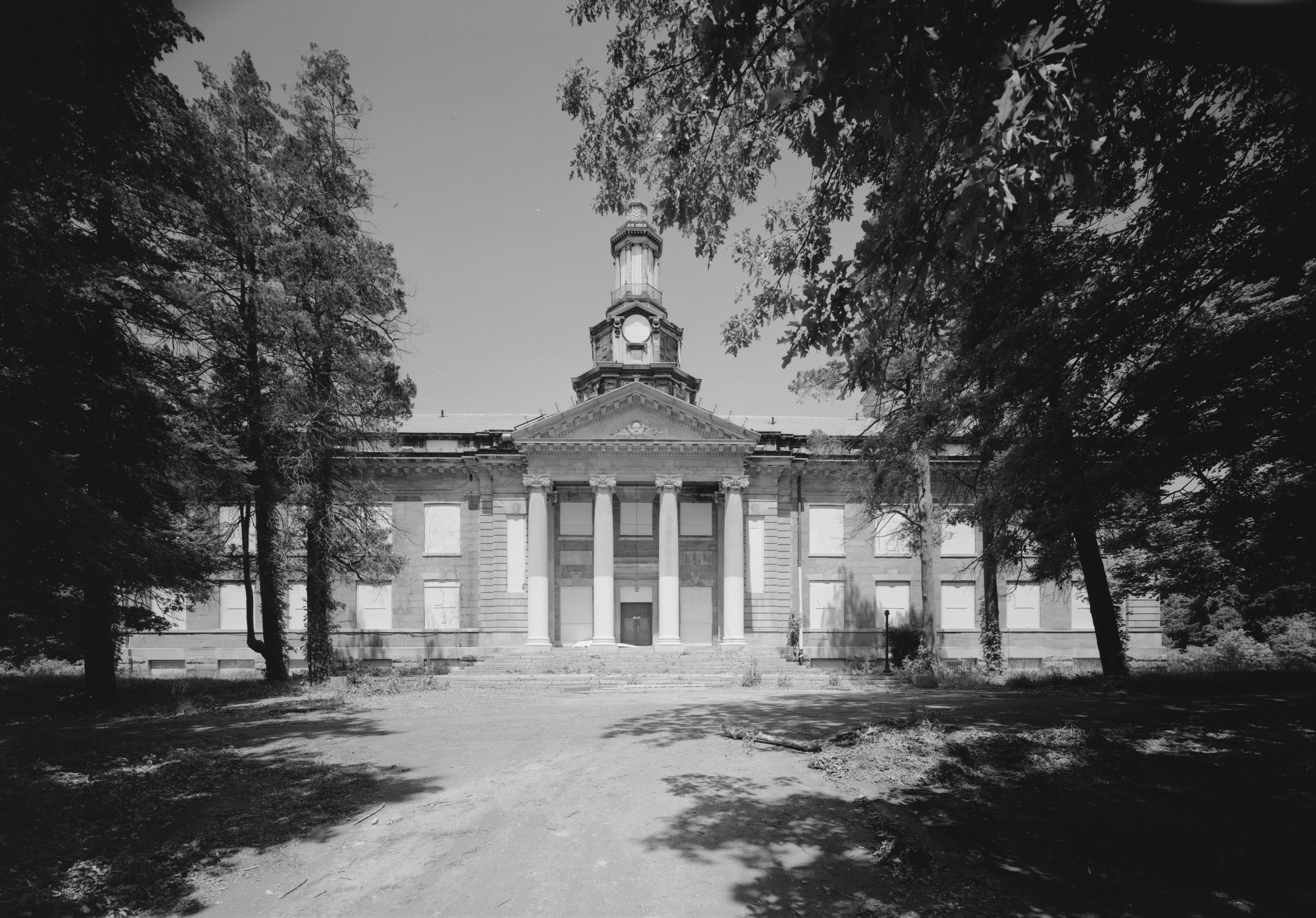

- Location within Maryland Location within the United States
- Location: formerly at Bainbridge Naval Training Grounds, Port Deposit, Maryland
- Coordinates: 39°36′10″N 76°6′26″W
- Area: 30 acres (12 ha)
- Built: 1900
- Architect: Boring & Tilton
- Architectural style: Colonial Revival, Georgian Revival
- NRHP reference No.: 84001760
- Added to NRHP: May 16, 1984

The Tome School is a private school in North East in Cecil County in the U.S. state of Maryland. Founded in 1894 by Jacob Tome, it is one of the oldest schools in Maryland. It enrolls grades K–12. As of September 2024, the Head of School is Jim Orndorff.

The school was founded as the Tome School for Boys in nearby Port Deposit. That campus, now owned by the Bainbridge Development Corporation, is no longer in operation and is closed to the public. Since the 2010s, several of its buildings have been damaged or destroyed by vandals, and the company has installed security cameras and taken other measures to keep trespassers off the property.

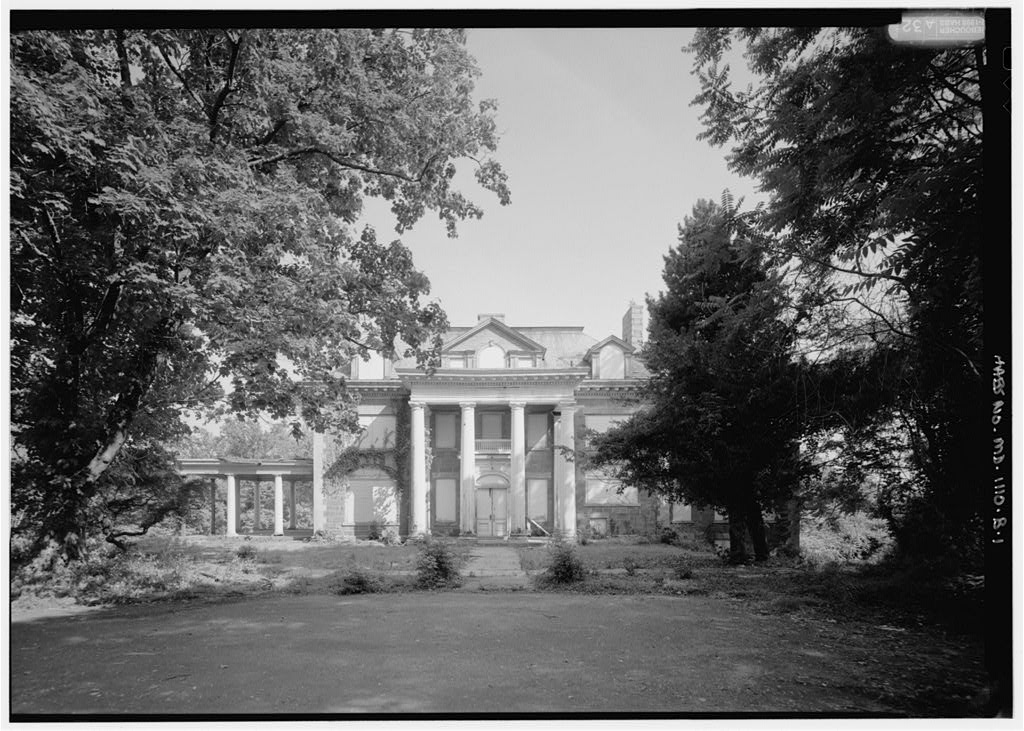
Original Director's residence of the Jacob Tome Institute

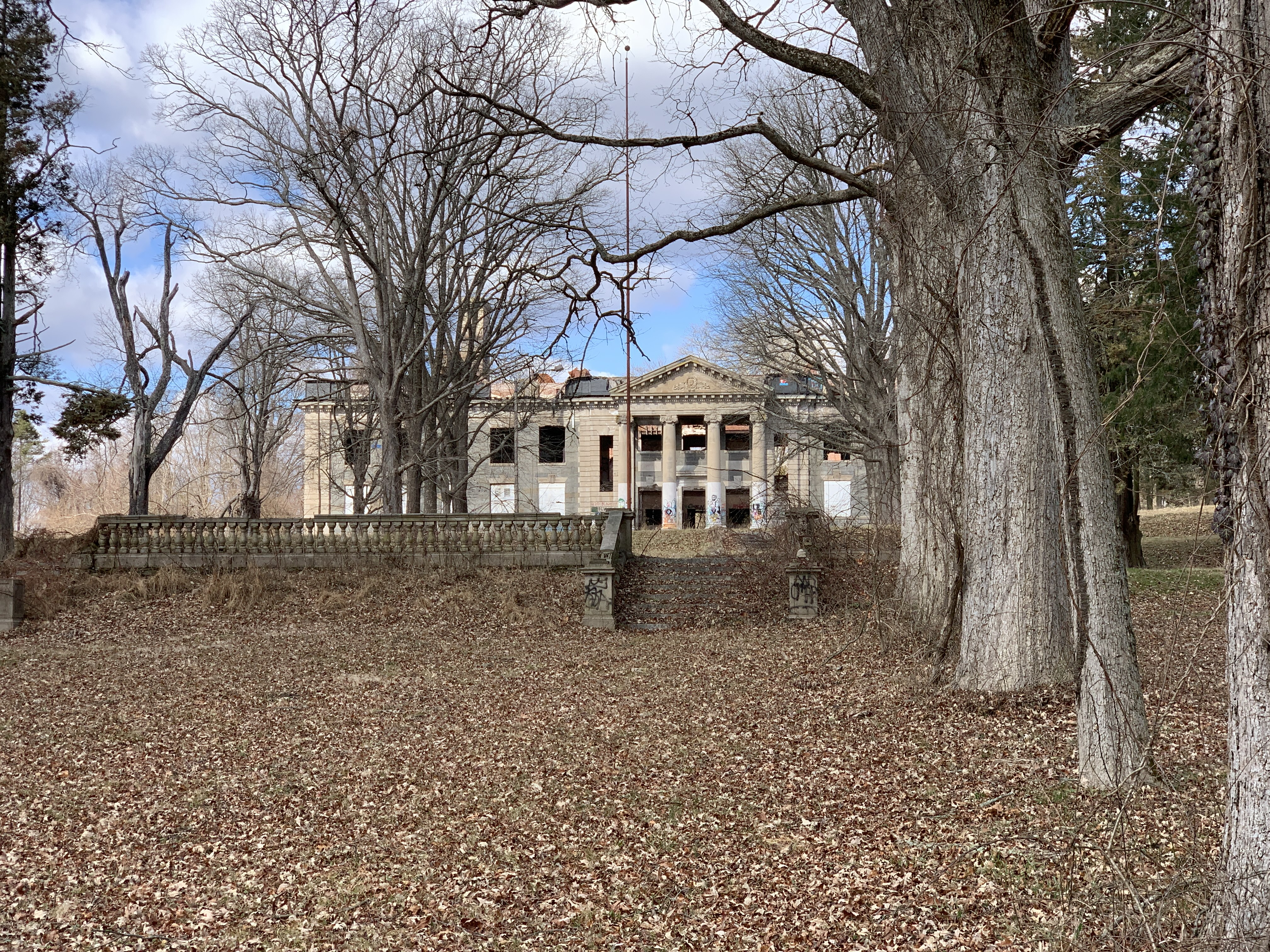
Memorial Hall, after the 2014 fire.

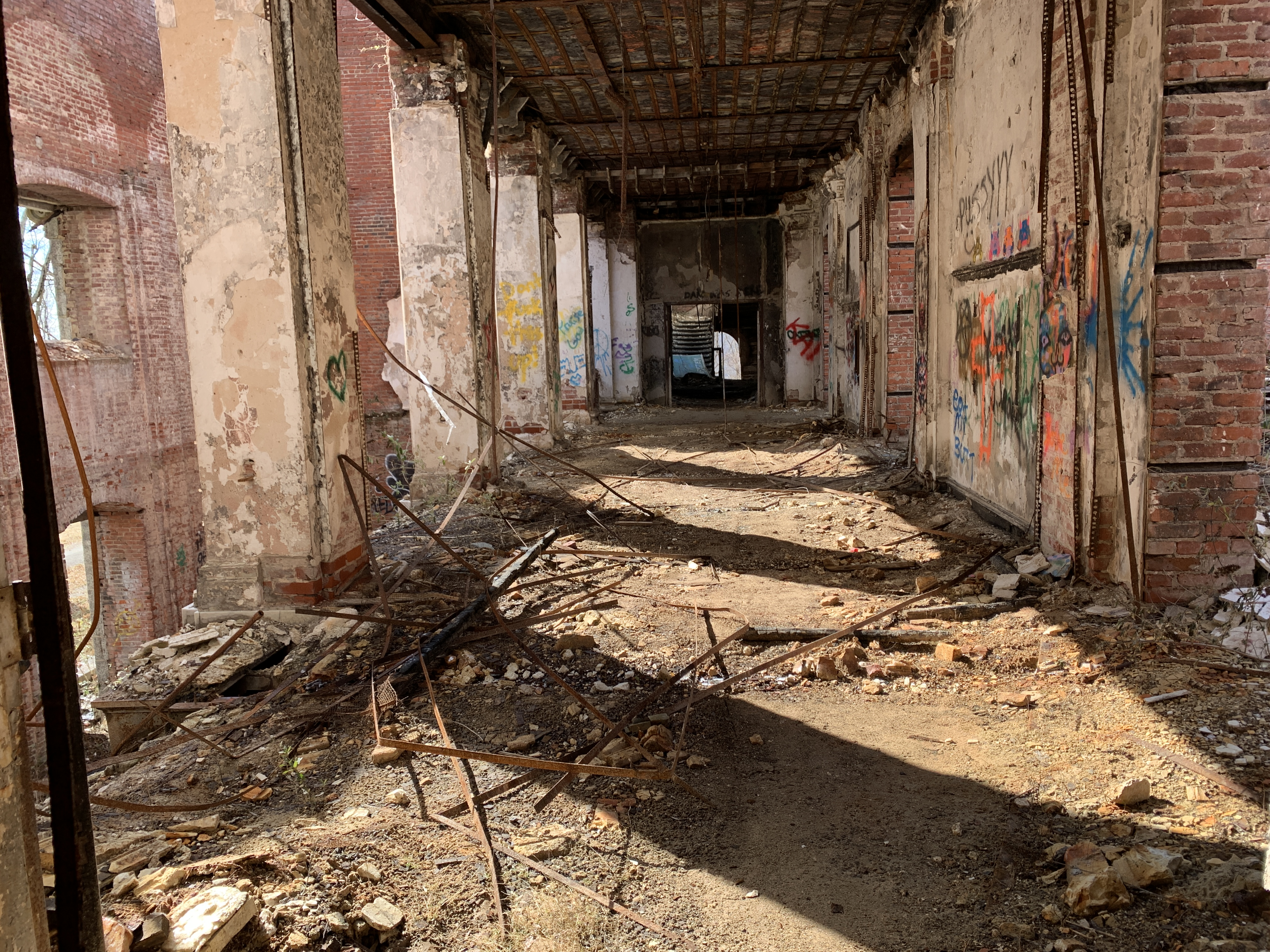
A charred and dilapidated hallway in the Memorial Hall building.

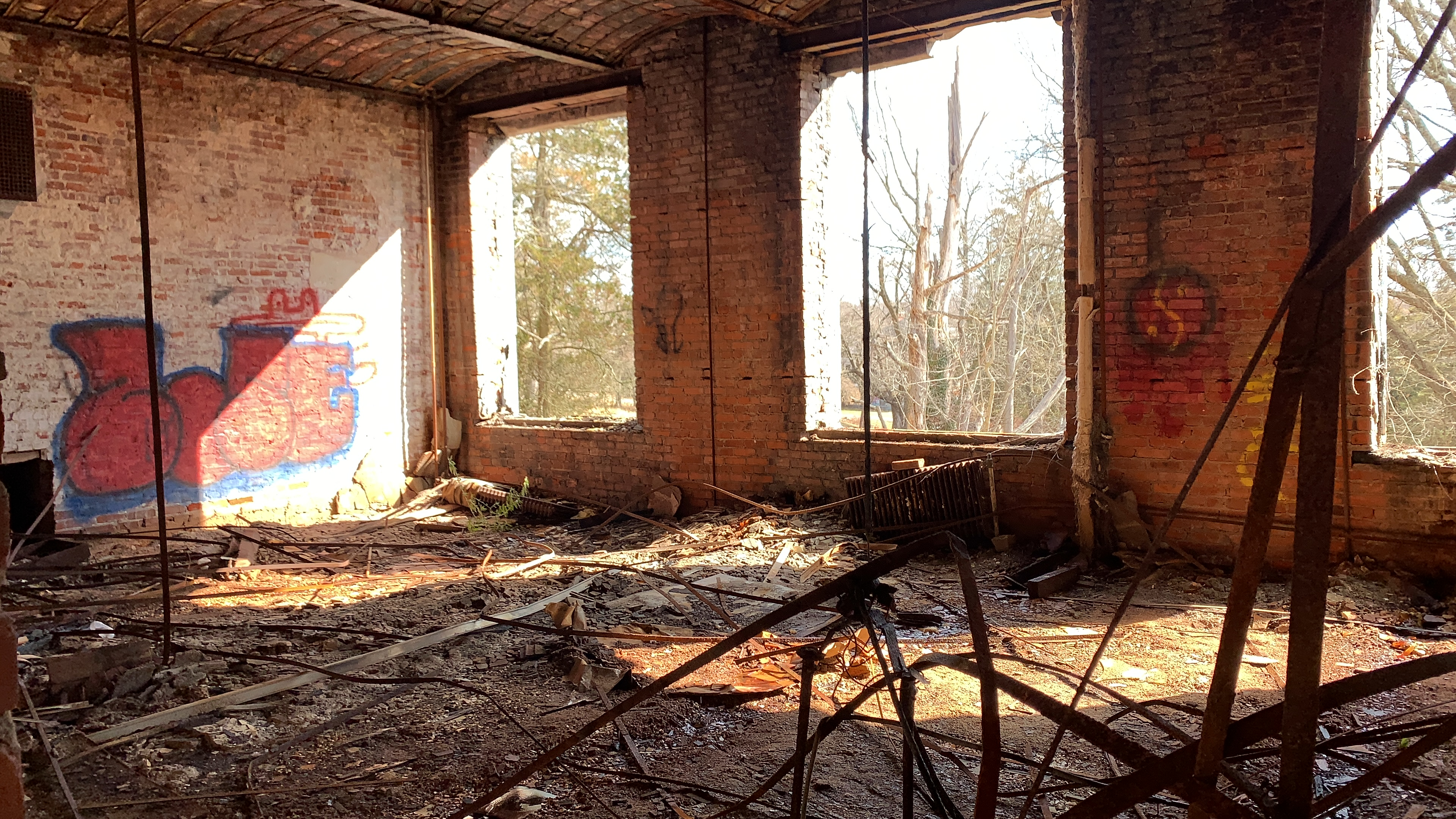
A gutted and burnt room in the Memorial Hall building.

== History ==
=== Port Deposit ===
In the early 1890s, Jacob Tome (1810–1898)—a wealthy railroad and timber magnate who had served in the Maryland State Senate—decided to open a nonsectarian college preparatory school for boys. He founded the Tome School for Boys on Main Street in Port Deposit, Maryland, on the east bank of the Susquehanna River. It opened for boarders and received its first students in 1894. It was part of a system of schools collectively known as the Jacob Tome Institute that began with kindergarten and extended through high school. Situated in the northeast corner of the state, the Tome School was immediately popular, attracting almost all the students from the town of Port Deposit and many from outside, throughout Maryland, Pennsylvania, and neighboring states.

Tome left the school an endowment at his death in 1898. Under the direction of his widow, Evalyn N. Tome, the Board of Trustees hired Scottish immigrant James Cameron Mackenzie (1852–1931) to direct the school. MacKenzie, one of the most important late 19th-century secondary school educators, proposed using the endowment to create a separate upper-level boarding school for boys. Two hundred acres on the bluff above the town and the broad and picturesque Susquehanna River were purchased for this purpose. MacKenzie in turn consulted with Robert Swain Peabody (1845–1917), of the prominent Boston architectural firm of Peabody & Stearns, concerning the design of the new Jacob Tome Institute.

Following a design competition in 1900, supervised by Peabody, the Board of Trustees selected designs in the then-popular Beaux-arts architectural style by partner architects William Boring (1859–1937) and Edward Lippincott Tilton (1861–1933), co-designers of the U.S. immigration station at Ellis Island in New York Harbor. Over the next five years, stone buildings were erected, using granite from local quarries. The tree-lined streets of the campus, which converged at the steps of Memorial Hall, were designed by landscape architect Frederick Law Olmsted (1822–1903), who had designed New York's Central Park. Olmsted selected landscape architect Charles Wellford Leavitt (1871–1928) to design the school's gardens. By 1902, the school had more than a dozen buildings and an endowment of $2 million ($74,423,077 today). Thirteen of these buildings survive, though some have been damaged or all but destroyed by fire: Memorial Hall, three dormitories (Jackson, Madison, and Harrison), the Chesapeake Inn dormitory and dining hall, the Director's residence, the Monroe Gymnasium, and six Master's cottages. Erika L. Quesenbery, author of United States Naval Training Center Bainbridge, wrote that Memorial Hall was the school's "centerpiece".

In the early 1900s, Tome played football annually against Baltimore City College, the third-oldest public high school in America, founded 1839, and with an interscholastic football team program dating back to the 1880s and had several other schools and colleges on its schedule. The rivalry was fairly even. The City's Collegians beat Tome 5–0 in 1903 and 11–8 in 1904, but Tome won 32–0 in 1912 and 37–0 in 1915. Other rivalries also were versus the Baltimore Polytechnic Institute, the mathematics/science/technology public high school, established 1883 that was also City College's arch-rival. These were the few other public secondary schools, in addition to several other private or religious schools, institutes and academies in the region offering worthy sports and academic competition.

In 1906, school director Abram W. Harris, along with Phi Beta Kappa members on the Tome School faculty, organized Alpha Delta Tau fraternity, which later became the Cum Laude Society.

The school enjoyed a prestigious reputation for a number of years. Its students included R. J. Reynolds Jr., a son of R. J. Reynolds; and children of the Mellon and Carnegie families.

=== United States Naval Training Center Bainbridge ===
After thriving for several decades, the Jacob Tome Institute fell into difficult financial straits during the Great Depression of the 1930s and closed in 1941. The following year, just after the United States entered World War II, President Franklin Delano Roosevelt approved the acquisition by condemnation of the property and land from 70 surrounding farms for use by the United States Navy as a training center. The institute's buildings were renovated for use by the Naval Academy Preparatory School to prepare future midshipmen for the U.S. Naval Academy further south at Annapolis, Maryland. On October 1, 1942, United States Naval Training Center Bainbridge—named for early-19th-century naval hero William Bainbridge—was activated. The training center operated through World War II, the Korean War, the Vietnam War, and the Cold War, graduating more than 500,000 recruits before it closed on March 31, 1976.

From 1979 to 1991, the campus was occupied by the Susquehanna Job Corps Center. In 2000, the site was transferred to the State of Maryland, which subsequently turned it over to the Bainbridge Development Corporation, a quasi-government corporation.

Meanwhile, the Tome School moved back to its original site on Main Street in Port Deposit. In 1971, the Tome School moved to a new, hundred-acre campus in North East, Maryland.

In 1984, the school property and buildings were listed on the National Register of Historic Places as a historic district in 1984.

=== Damages ===
Several of the old Tome School for Boys campus buildings have been damaged or destroyed by arsonists and trespassers.

On September 21, 2014, a fire damaged the old campus' Memorial Hall, destroying its clock tower. Only the granite structure remains.

In 2018, a local newspaper wrote of the old campus that Van Buren, Madison, and Monroe Halls remain, while the headmaster's house "is badly vandalized but standing", and Jackson Hall "like Memorial Hall, is a burned-out hulk."

In 2019, 11 people—all 15 to 18 years old—were spotted by the acting Port Deposit police chief on the property. They were subsequently arrested and charged with trespassing.

On May 6, 2020, a fire burned the former Inn to the ground.

The Bainbridge Development Corporation has since installed a security system that is "fully wireless and solar powered" with "cameras at key points on the property, monitoring 24/7." As of September 2022, the company was installing 100 "No Trespassing” signs.

== Academics ==
The co-educational school enrolls students from kindergarten through twelfth grade. The curriculum provides a broad liberal arts education in an environment emphasizing academic success, high standards of personal behavior, and full participation in school life. The student body is divided among three schools:

- Lower School (K-4). Students begin French and Spanish language study in first grade.
- Middle School (5–8). Students are required to take Latin study in the seventh grade through eighth grade.
- Upper School (9–12). Students concentrate on a traditional college prep academic program.

== Extracurricular activities ==
- Varsity sports: basketball, soccer, lacrosse, cross country, tennis, volleyball, field hockey, softball, baseball, golf, and cheerleading.
- Junior varsity sports: basketball, soccer, cross country, field hockey, volleyball, and tennis.
- Organizations and clubs: National Honor Society, Junior National Honor Society, Key Club, Builders Club, Middle School Chorus, Orchestra, Student Government, Chess Club, Environmental Club, Envirothon Team, and Student Literary Magazine.

== Notable alumni, faculty, and staff ==
- Abner Biberman: actor, director, and screenwriter
- Thomas Baker: president of Carnegie Institute of Technology
- John B. Breckinridge: Attorney General of Kentucky and U.S. Representative
- Harry A. Cantwell (died 1972), physician and member of the Maryland Senate
- Forrest Craver: football head coach, director of sports
- Kent Curtis: American novelist, illustrator, composer, yachtsman, and teacher
- James Devereux: United States Marine Corps general, Navy Cross recipient, and U.S. Representative from Maryland
- Eric P. Hamp: linguist
- William S. James: Maryland state legislator and Treasurer
- Harry LeGore: American football and baseball player, Maryland state legislator and businessman
- John H. Kimble (died 1938), treasurer of Tome School, member of the Maryland House of Delegates
- Norman T. Kirk: Surgeon General of the United States Army
- Jim Meade: American football player and coach
- James Rouse: founder of The Rouse Company, attended for one year
- Lansdale Sasscer: U.S. Representative from Maryland
- Milward Simpson (1897–1993), class of 1917, U.S. Senator and as the 23rd Governor of Wyoming
