= Port Deposit, Maryland =

Historic district in Maryland, United States

- Town
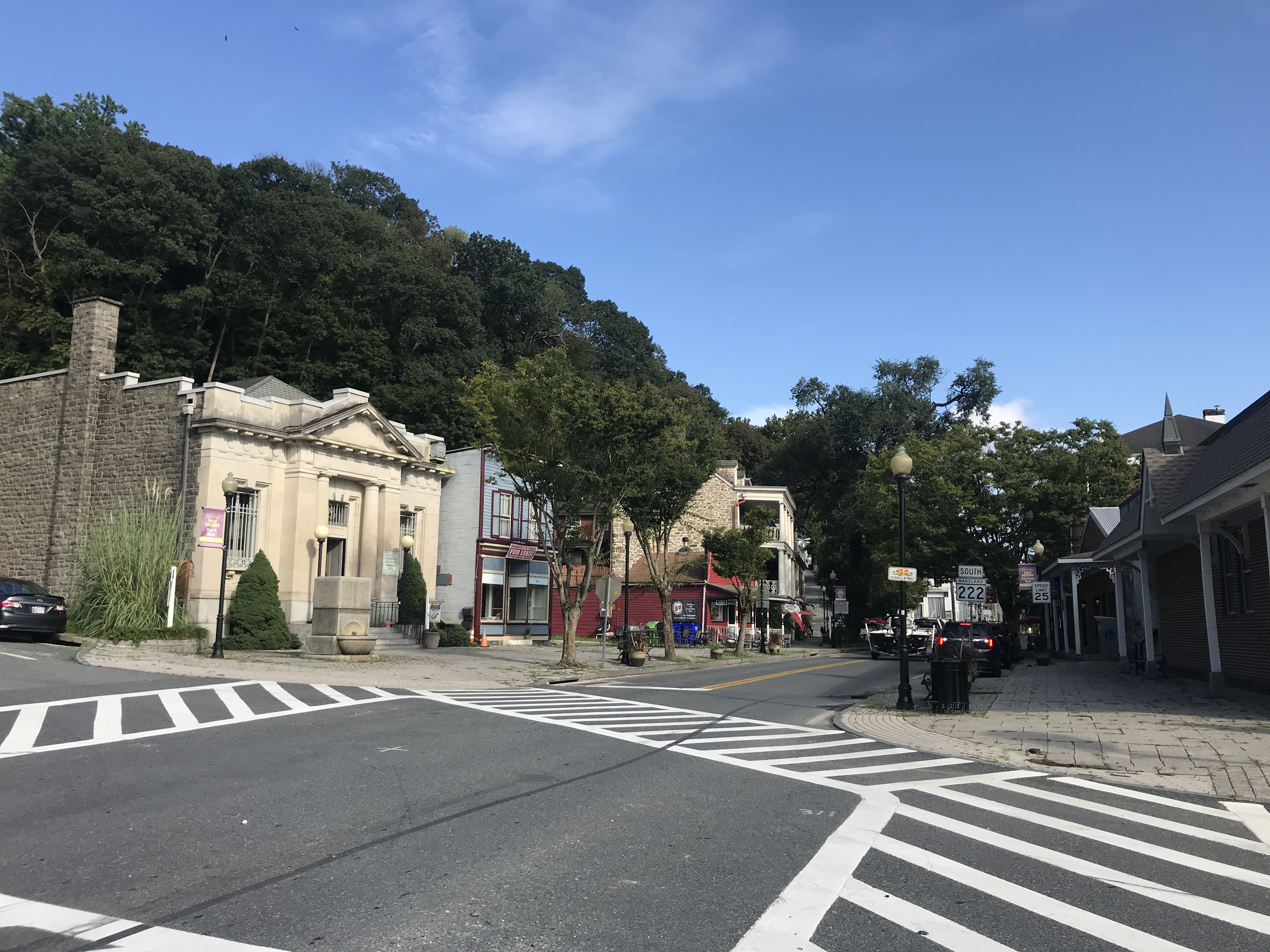
- Downtown Port Deposit (2021)

- Flag Seal

- Location of Port Deposit, Maryland
- Coordinates: 39°36′39″N 76°6′1″W
- Country: United States
- State: Maryland
- County: Cecil
- Incorporated: 1824

Government
  - Mayor: Wayne Tome Jr.

Area
  - Total: 2.27 sq mi (5.87 km^{2})
  - Land: 2.26 sq mi (5.86 km^{2})
  - Water: 0.0039 sq mi (0.01 km^{2})
- Elevation: 49 ft (15 m)

Population (2020)
  - Total: 614
  - Density: 271.4/sq mi (104.79/km^{2})
- Time zone: UTC−5 (Eastern (EST))
  - Summer (DST): UTC−4 (EDT)
- ZIP code: 21904
- Area code: 410
- FIPS code: 24-63075
- GNIS feature ID: 0591049
- Website: http://www.portdeposit.org/
- Port Deposit
- U.S. National Register of Historic Places
- U.S. Historic district
- Location within Maryland Location within the United States
- Location: E bank of Susquehanna River 10 mi. (16 km) S of Mason-Dixon Line, Port Deposit, Maryland
- Area: 280 acres (113.3 ha)
- Architectural style: Second Empire, Queen Anne, Georgian
- NRHP reference No.: 78001452
- Added to NRHP: May 23, 1978

Port Deposit is a town in Cecil County, Maryland, United States. It is located on the east bank of the Susquehanna River near its discharge into the Chesapeake Bay. As of the 2020 census, Port Deposit had a population of 614.

== Geography ==
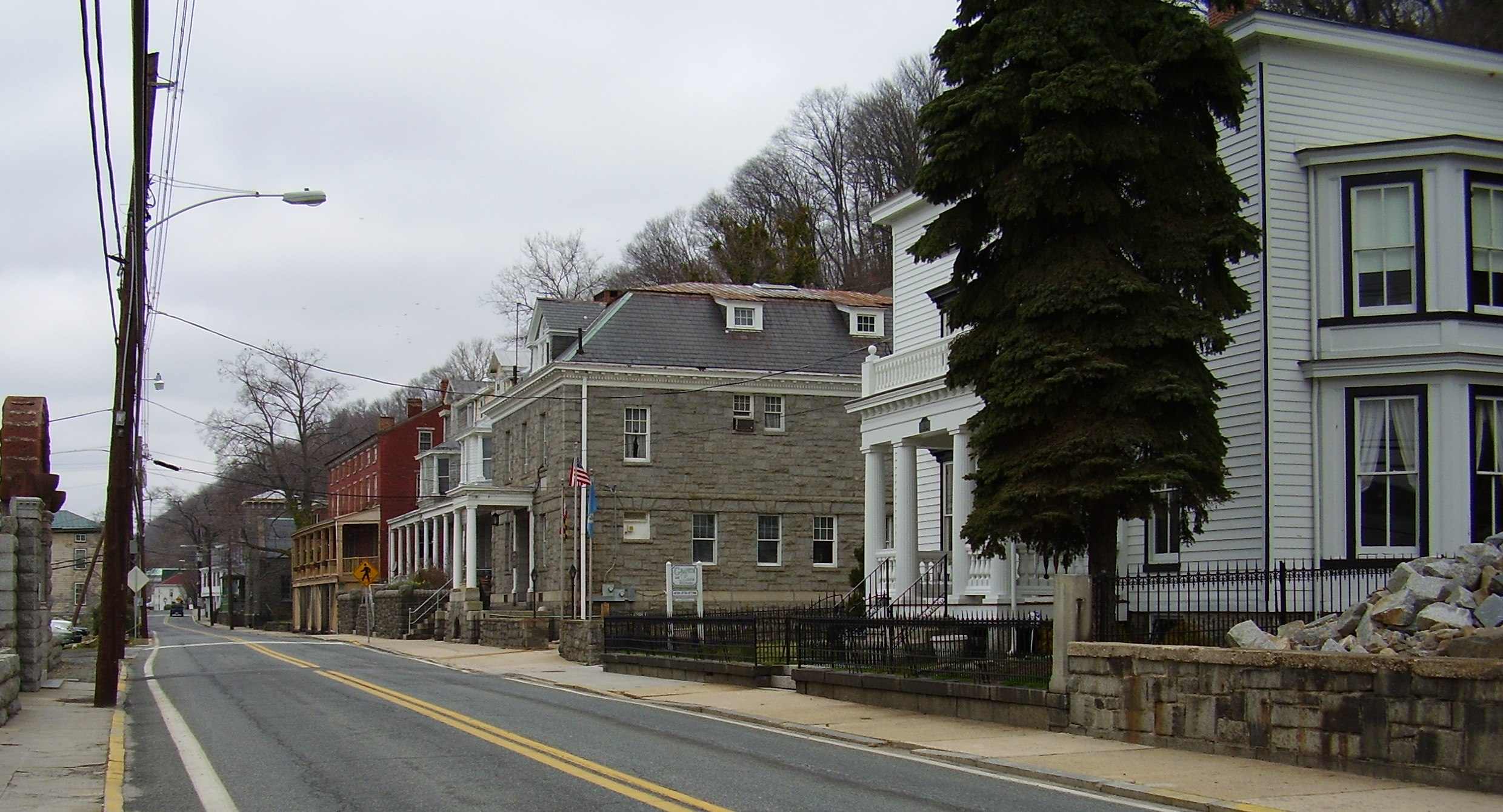
Main Street in historic Port Deposit

Port Deposit is located at 39°36′39″N 76°6′1″W (39.610915, -76.100172).

According to the United States Census Bureau, the town has a total area of 2.28 square miles (5.91 km^{2}), of which 2.27 square miles (5.88 km^{2}) is land and 0.01 square miles (0.03 km^{2}) is water.

It is the westernmost incorporated municipality in Cecil County, as well as in the Philadelphia metropolitan area.

== History ==
=== Early history ===
The first recorded European visits to the area were the 1608 and 1609 expeditions led by Captain John Smith up the Chesapeake Bay. He sailed about 2 miles (3.2 km) up the Susquehanna River to the present location of Port Deposit, and gave the name of "Smythe Fayles" to the rapids just above the future town.

=== The upper ferry ===
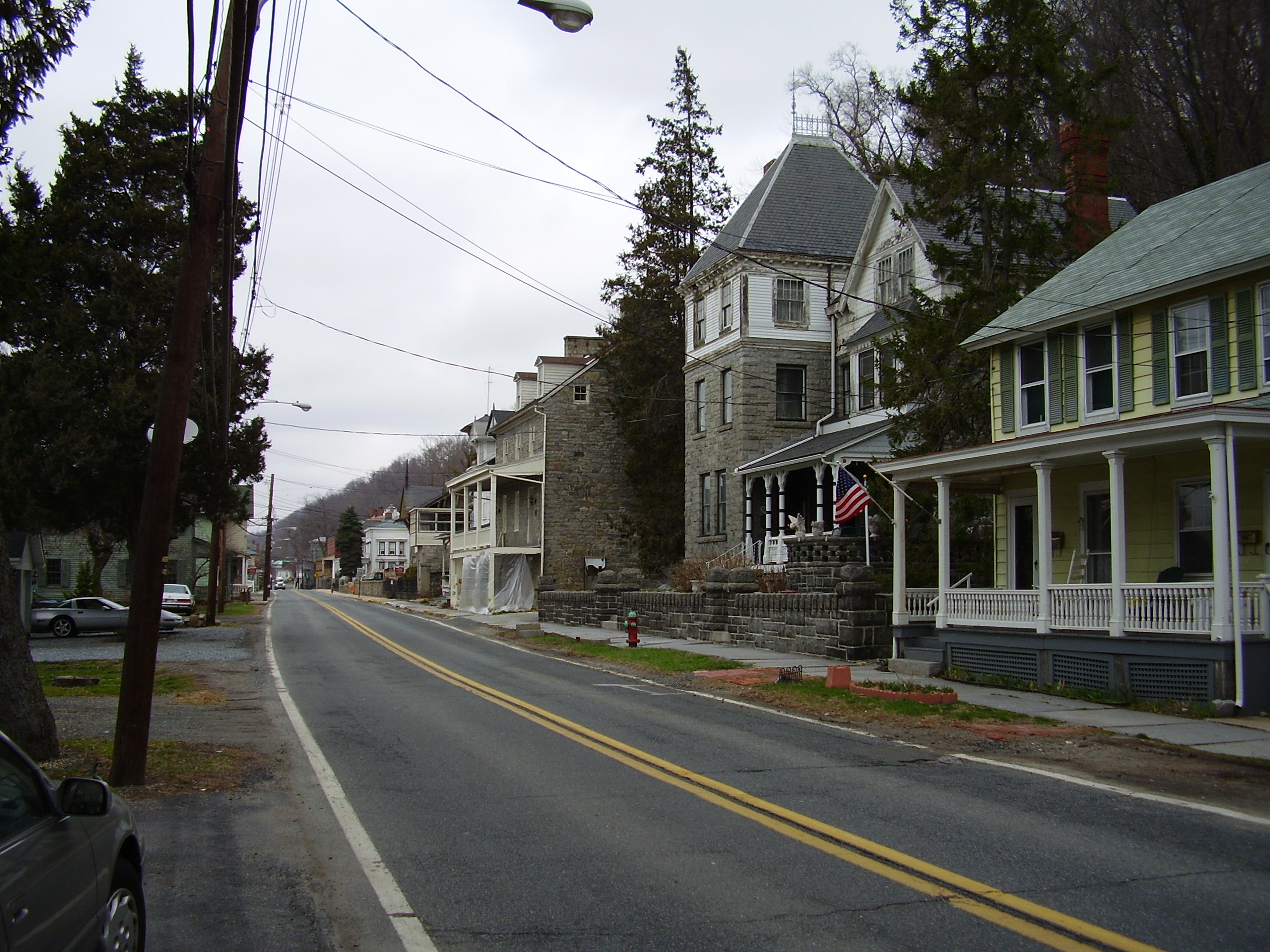
Historic buildings in Port Deposit

In 1729, Thomas Cresap established a regular ferry service near Smith's Falls (in the upper Port Deposit area) crossing the Susquehanna to Lapidum; this was referred to as Smith's Ferry or Upper Ferry. In 1731, a road from Susquehanna Upper Ferry toward Philadelphia, as far as the jurisdiction extends, was authorized. In the same year, in the jurisdiction south of the river, a petition was submitted for a road from the mill at 'Rock Run' to Peach Bottom, Pennsylvania. This upper ferry was later purchased by Colonel John Creswell and came to be known as 'Creswell's Ferry'.

This location, and Lapidum across the river, were the northernmost navigable deepwater ports on the Susquehanna. River barges and wagons loaded with lumber, grain, coal, whiskey, tobacco, and other goods floated downriver to this "port of deposit", where cargo could be transferred to ships from the Chesapeake. In the early days, it was difficult to float goods downriver, since there were many rapids and hazards, but it remained the most convenient way for goods to leave much of the country drained by the Susquehanna above the falls. Further, since a number of roads converged at the ferry crossing, goods could be carted or "rolled."

As early as the 1790s, the forests on the Susquehanna were being logged and the timbers floated downriver to points near the ferry landing. In 1812, the town was platted as Creswell's Landing; months later, Governor Levin Winder signed a bill officially naming the town Port Deposite (it would lose the trailing "e" at some point in the future).

=== The canal ===
The Susquehanna Canal (which had several owners and names over the years, including the Maryland Canal) was completed in 1812 and contributed much toward the town's growth. Until the canal was placed in service bypassing Smith's Falls, most of the traffic stopped at Lapidum, across the Susquehanna River since it was easier to run the rapids on the south side. However, the new canal — the Susquehanna and Tidewater Canal on the north side of the river — funneled the barge traffic into Port Deposit, stimulating rapid growth.

=== Granite and bridges ===
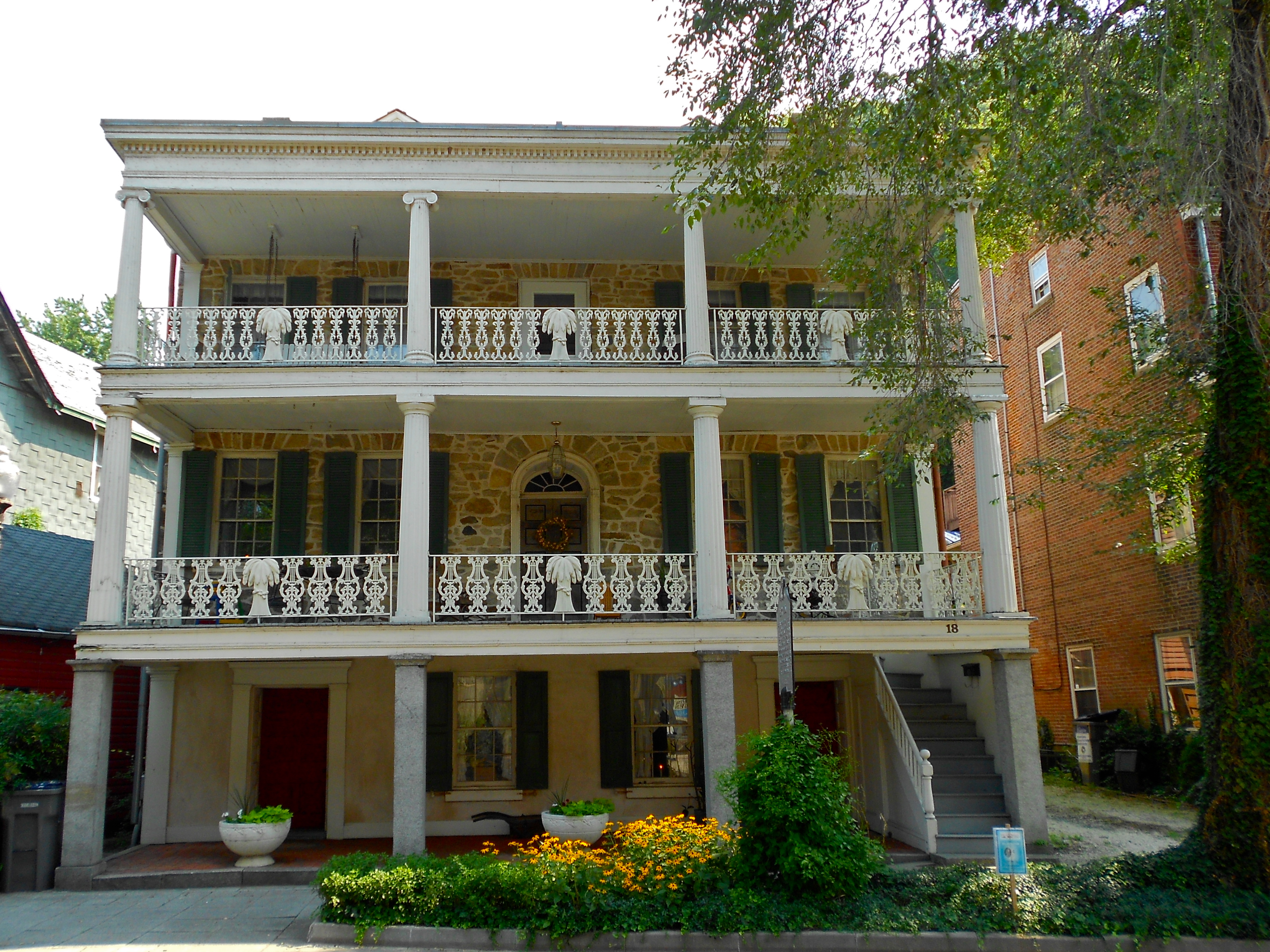
The Gerry House was built in 1812. Lafayette was entertained here in 1824.

The first attempts to bridge the Susquehanna in Maryland were made by the Port Deposit Bridge Company, incorporated in 1808. Its attempts failed, so the Legislature in 1812 authorized another company to proceed. After completing a survey in 1813, which included the first written reference to Port Deposit, the company proposed a location that complied with the law but was longer than necessary. After petitioning for relief, the company was allowed to route the bridge closer to the falls, allowing it to be 1,000 feet (300 m) shorter. The Port Deposit Bridge, a wooden covered bridge, was built just north of Port Deposit during 1817 and 1818. Put into service in 1818, it was the earliest bridge crossing of the Susquehanna. Rebuilt after a span burned in 1823, it remained in service until 1857.

A 4 acres (16,000 m^{2}) site at the north end of Port Deposit was committed to quarrying "granite." (actually gneiss) for bridges. The general area had been the site for granite quarrying before the bridge was constructed as there was use of this specific granite in buildings constructed before the Revolutionary War. This granite can be seen in many of the distinctive buildings in Port Deposit today.

Quarries were also opened here in 1829 by the proprietors of a competitor canal, the Susquehanna and Tidewater Canal, between Havre de Grace and Wrightsville, Pennsylvania, for canal construction projects routed along the opposite bank of the Susquehanna.

These quarries continued in service well into the 20th century. Port Deposit gneiss was used in:

- Many houses and five churches in Port Deposit
- Schools such as the U.S. Naval Academy, Haverford College and Catholic University of America
- Fort McHenry, Fort Delaware and Fort Carroll
- Public buildings like the Boston Public Library and the U.S. Treasury Building
- Public works such as the Concord Point Lighthouse, Lincoln Tunnel and the St Augustine seawall

=== Incorporation ===
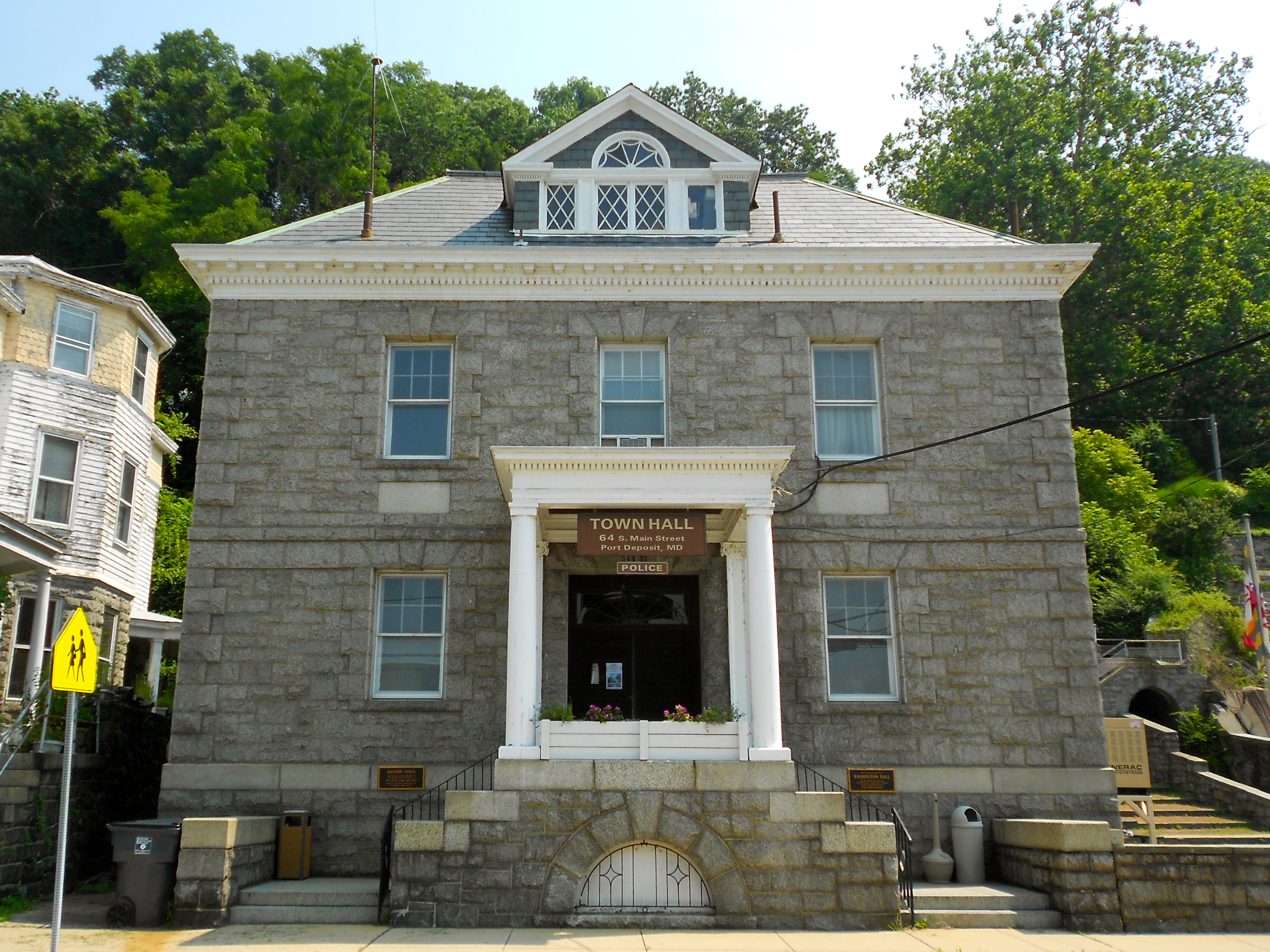
Town Hall

Port Deposit was incorporated in 1824.

=== Arrival of the railroad ===
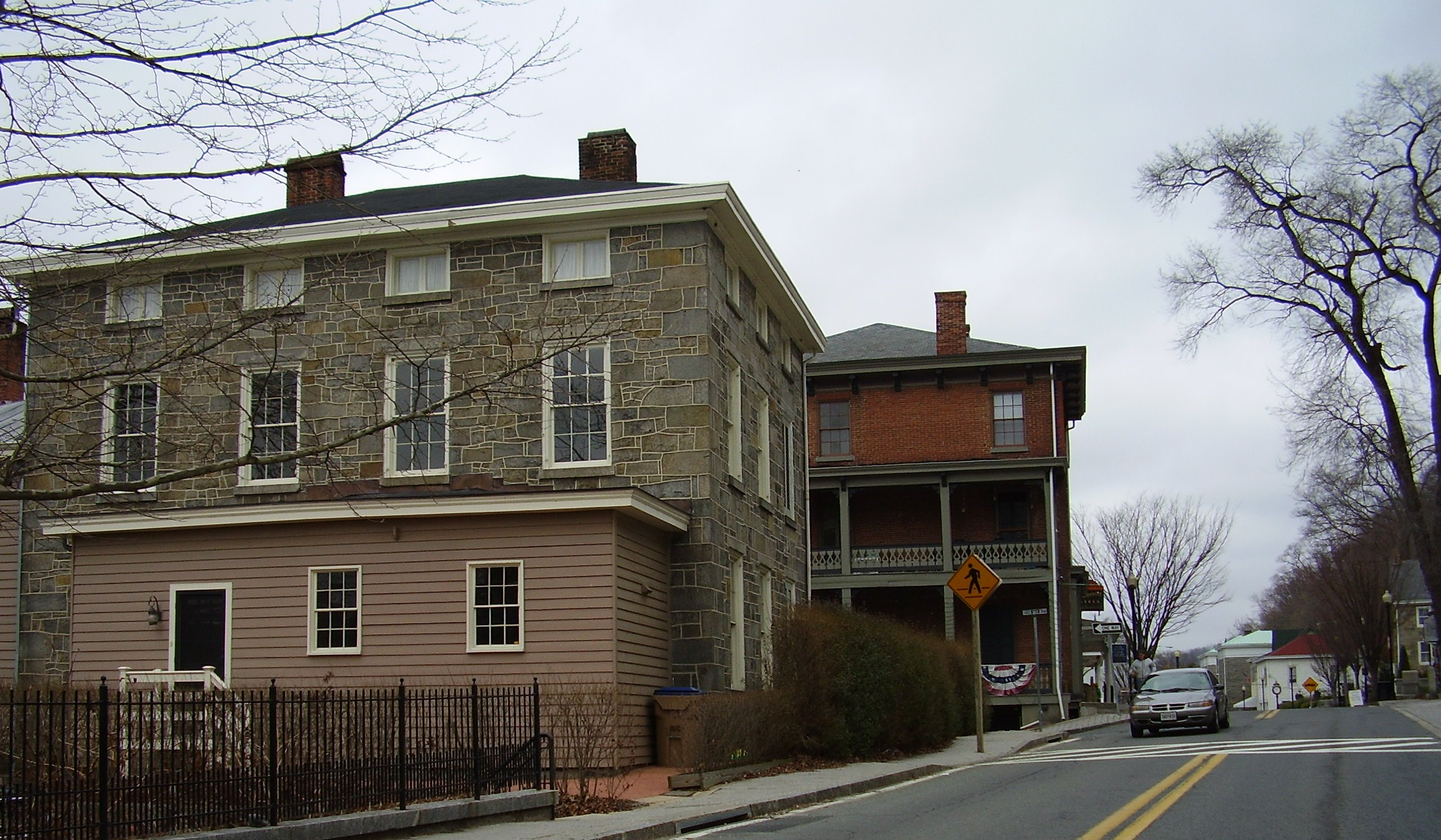
More houses along main street in Port Deposit

In 1832, the governments of Maryland, Delaware, and Pennsylvania chartered a quartet of railroads to connect Baltimore and Philadelphia. The Maryland General Assembly chartered two railroads terminating at Port Deposit: the Baltimore and Port Deposite Rail Road Company to build a line from the Susquehanna's western bank to Baltimore; and the Delaware and Maryland Rail Road Company to build from the river's eastern bank to the Delaware state line. That same year, Delaware chartered the Wilmington and Susquehanna Rail Road Company to continue the line to Wilmington. In 1836, the D&M merged with the W&S to form the Wilmington and Susquehanna Railroad Company. On February 12, 1838, all three companies merged to form the Philadelphia, Wilmington and Baltimore Railroad Company, forging a continuous line from Philadelphia to Baltimore. The main line passed southeast of Port Deposit; the town was connected by a branch line in 1866, running along the riverbank from Perryville. In 1881, the PW&B came under the control of the Pennsylvania Railroad (PRR). In 1893 the branch line was sold to the Columbia and Port Deposit Railway, also PRR-controlled.

=== Jacob Tome ===
Jacob Tome arrived in Port Deposit penniless; became a banker, philanthropist, and politician; and died one of the richest men in the United States. He was to become Cecil County's first millionaire and its greatest philanthropist. The Tome mansion (built in 1850 but no longer standing) was the largest house in the town. In 1889, Tome founded the Jacob Tome School for Boys on Main Street, part of a system of schools called the Jacob Tome Institute. When he died on March 16, 1898, in Port Deposit, he left a substantial endowment for the institute, which the Tome School tapped to build a series of beaux arts granite buildings on the bluffs above Port Deposit, overlooking the Susquehanna River.

The CP-TOME interlocking on the railroad line through downtown Port Deposit is named in his honor.

=== Damming the Susquehanna ===
The Susquehanna River drops 167 feet (51 m) as it passes through the region above Port Deposit, as it cuts through the hard rock of the region. This characteristic, which had long been good for Port Deposit, also attracted power companies in the boom period after World War I. The Conowingo Dam, built in 1927, permanently changed the character of the town by terminating all river traffic and decimating what was left of the shad and herring fishery which was once found there. Port Deposit benefited from the dam as well; destructive accumulations of ice (referred to as ice gouges) no longer accumulated in the Conowingo Rapids or passed through Port Deposit, as it had to terrible effect in 1907.

=== Other industry ===
Formerly a major industry in Port Deposit, Wiley's Manufacturing, fabricated the Fort McHenry Tunnel sections. They were floated and towed to the Baltimore construction site using tugboats. Construction was completed in 1985.

The immersed tubes of the 63rd Street Tunnel were fabricated at a shipyard in Port Deposit and then towed to New York City.

=== National Register of Historic Places listing ===
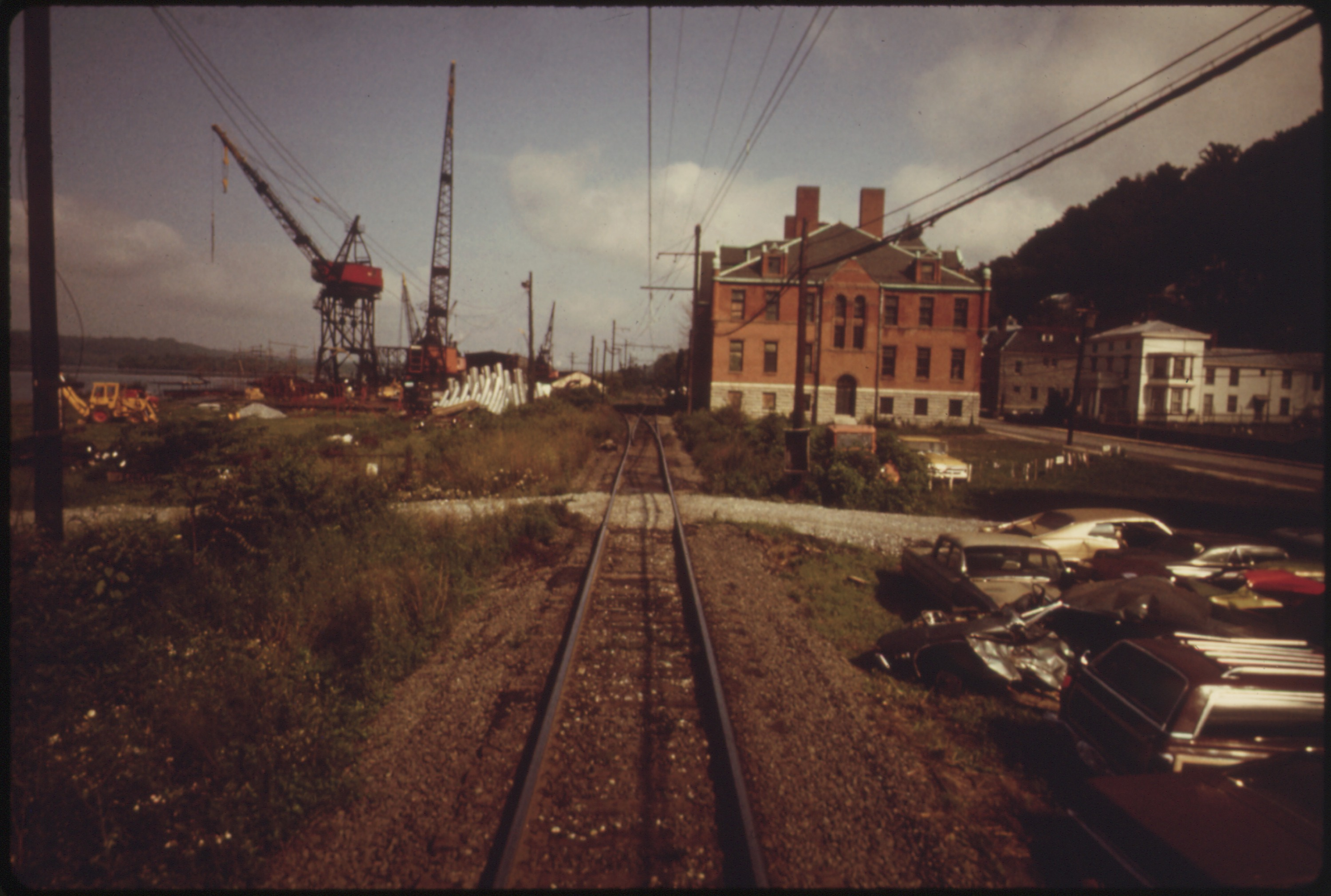
Washington Hall as viewed from the Washington section of Amtrak's Broadway Limited in 1974.

The entire town of Port Deposit was listed as a historic district on the National Register of Historic Places on May 23, 1978. Starting from Bainbridge Road on the south, the district extends about 1.4 miles north along US 222 to the quarry at the north end of town.

The town has several impressive older buildings, many built of the local granite or brick. The oldest structures in the historic district date from 1725, with the majority built from 1830 through the 1890s.

The town remained largely unspoiled by new construction until the late 20th century, since there was little room for construction. The bulk of the older buildings line the main street and the, until recently, single side street built in the narrow space between the bluffs and the river. The bluffs have been terraced and stairways lead between streets. Adams Hall, formerly part of the Tome Institute, became the Town Hall; the only remains of the Tome Institute's former Washington Hall is the granite doorway that separates the Main Street from a parking lot today.

=== Police Department ===
During the second half of the twentieth century, Port Deposit maintained a small police department, mostly made up of parttime officers. Around 1966, the town council promoted Horace Boddy, one of the parttime patrolman, to chief of police. He had joined the force in the early 1960s, and with the command appointment he became the first African American police chief in Cecil County. In 1980, Chief Boddy stepped down from the commanding role. His next senior officer, Bill Waibel, became the chief as Boddy stayed on the force as a patrolman. He retired fully in 1983.

== Transportation ==
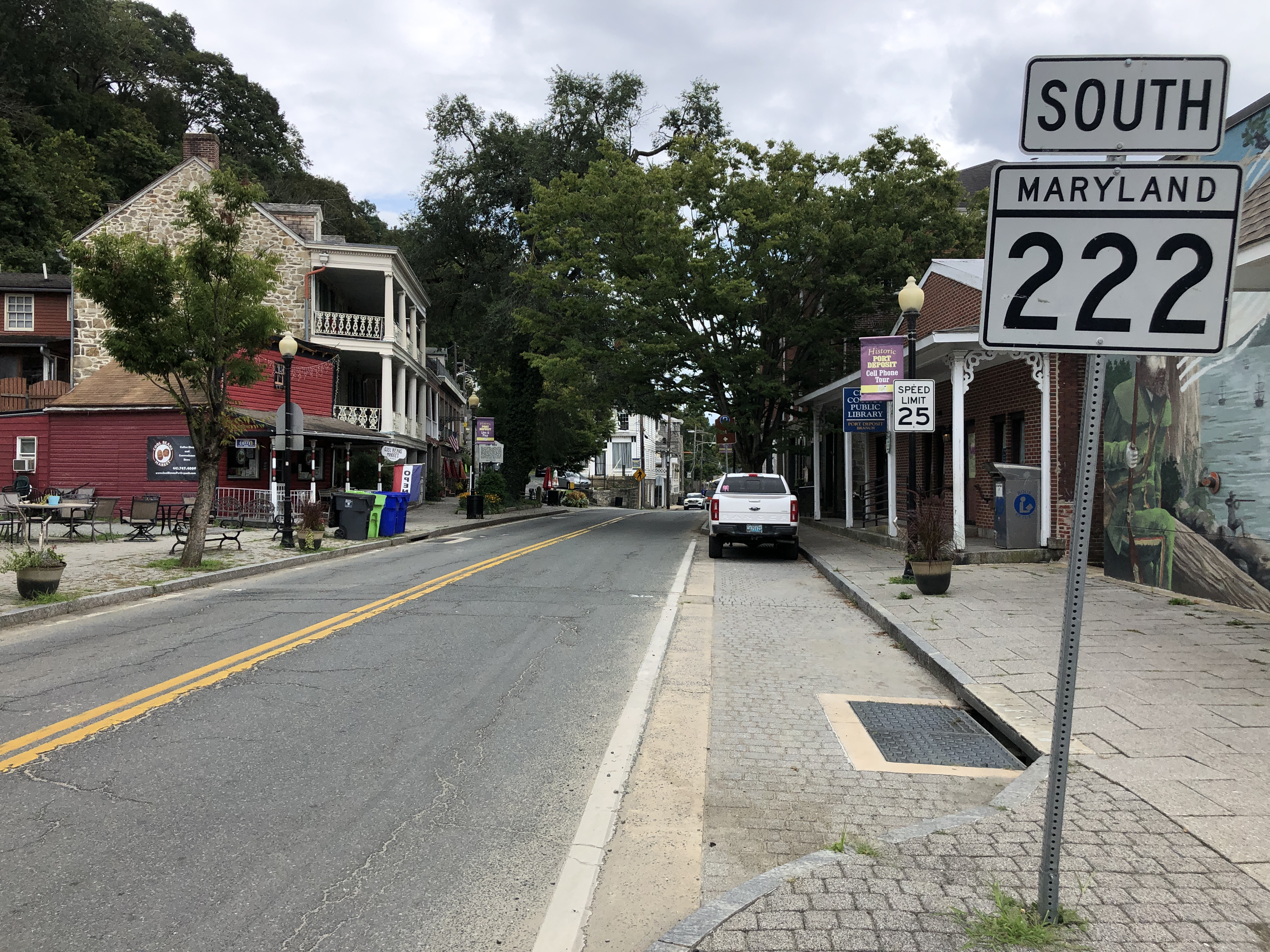
MD 222 southbound in Port Deposit

=== Roadways ===
The present-day primary method of transportation to and from Port Deposit is by road. Maryland Route 222 passes through the center of town along Main Street, connecting northwards to U.S. Route 1 near Conowingo Dam and southward to Perryville and Interstate 95, which is the nearest Interstate highway. Both US 1 and I-95 head north towards Philadelphia and south towards Baltimore. Maryland Route 276 also serves Port Deposit, heading northeast towards Rising Sun.

=== Demand response ===
Cecil Transit operates on demand transit to Port Deposit.

== Demographics ==
Historical population
Census	Pop.	Note	%±
1850	988		—
1870	1,839		—
1880	1,950		6.0%
1890	1,908		−2.2%
1900	1,575		−17.5%
1910	1,394		−11.5%
1920	1,090		−21.8%
1930	963		−11.7%
1940	883		−8.3%
1950	1,139		29.0%
1960	953		−16.3%
1970	906		−4.9%
1980	664		−26.7%
1990	685		3.2%
2000	676		−1.3%
2010	653		−3.4%
2020	614		−6.0%
U.S. Decennial Census

=== 2010 census ===
As of the census of 2010, there were 653 people, 265 households, and 153 families living in the town. The population density was 287.7 inhabitants per square mile (111.1/km^{2}). There were 429 housing units at an average density of 189.0 per square mile (73.0/km^{2}). The racial makeup of the town was 82.8% White, 11.9% African American, 1.4% Native American, 0.6% Asian, 0.6% from other races, and 2.6% from two or more races. Hispanic or Latino of any race were 3.2% of the population.

There were 265 households, of which 26.0% had children under the age of 18 living with them, 35.8% were married couples living together, 14.0% had a female householder with no husband present, 7.9% had a male householder with no wife present, and 42.3% were non-families. 30.6% of all households were made up of individuals, and 5.7% had someone living alone who was 65 years of age or older. The average household size was 2.39 and the average family size was 2.89.

The median age in the town was 39.4 years. 19.4% of residents were under the age of 18; 10.2% were between the ages of 18 and 24; 26.8% were from 25 to 44; 32.8% were from 45 to 64; and 10.9% were 65 years of age or older. The gender makeup of the town was 53.9% male and 46.1% female.

=== 2000 census ===
As of the census of 2000, there were 676 people, 264 households, and 163 families living in the town. The population density was 404.8 inhabitants per square mile (156.3/km^{2}). There were 402 housing units at an average density of 240.7 per square mile (92.9/km^{2}). The racial makeup of the town was 78.85% White, 17.75% African American, 0.44% Native American, 0.59% Asian, 0.59% from other races, and 1.78% from two or more races. Hispanic or Latino of any race were 1.63% of the population.

There were 264 households, out of which 29.9% had children under the age of 18 living with them, 34.1% were married couples living together, 21.6% had a female householder with no husband present, and 37.9% were non-families. 29.5% of all households were made up of individuals, and 9.5% had someone living alone who was 65 years of age or older. The average household size was 2.50 and the average family size was 3.08.

In the town, the population was spread out, with 27.5% under the age of 18, 8.1% from 18 to 24, 28.4% from 25 to 44, 26.8% from 45 to 64, and 9.2% who were 65 years of age or older. The median age was 36 years. For every 100 females, there were 109.3 males. For every 100 women age 18 and over, there were 100.0 men.

The median income for a household in the town was $34,167, and the median income for a family was $37,813. Males had a median income of $32,083 versus $21,932 for females. The per capita income for the town was $15,297. About 19.4% of families and 22.2% of the population were below the poverty line, including 35.4% of those under age 18 and 12.8% of those age 65 or over.

== Notable residents ==
- Henry Lee Lucas lived briefly in Benjamins Trailer Park
- John Conard (1773–1857) served in the U.S. House of Representatives and settled near Port Deposit for 1834–1851 after retiring from politics.
- Jacob Tome
- Joseph Irwin France (1873–1939) taught at the Tome School in Port Deposit for a period and later was a United States Senator(1917–1923).
- John A. J. Creswell (born 1828 in Port Deposit) was a United States Senator (1865–1867) and United States Postmaster General (1869 and 1874).
- James Devereux (1903–1988), who attended the Tome School, was a Marine General during the defense of Wake Island in December 1941 and later served in the United States House of Representatives (1951–1959).
- Sarah Collins Fernandis (1863–1951), social worker, educator, poet, born in Port Deposit
- Admiral Frank B. Kelso II (1933–2013), who later became Chief of Naval Operations, served as Commanding Officer, U.S. Naval Nuclear Power School at the nearby U.S. Naval Training Center Bainbridge from 1969 to 1971.
- Clara Dutton Noyes (1869–1936) was born in Port Deposit. She headed the Red Cross Nursing Division during World War I, enlisting more than 20,000 nurses to duty overseas, and received many international medals and honors for her work.
- Martha Tracy Owler (born 1852 in Port Deposit) was a journalist and writer

== See also ==
- Tome School
- United States Naval Training Center Bainbridge
