= List of Maryland gubernatorial elections =

Maryland gubernatorial elections in their modern sense, have been held since the implementation of the Maryland Constitution of 1867 to directly elect the governor of Maryland and the officers that work with the winner candidate.

After the initial election was held on November 5, 1867, when Oden Bowie became the 34th governor of Maryland, each subsequent election was held every four years in November.

The candidates for the elections are previously selected in July of the same year in the primary elections in Maryland, but the difference with the primaries is that in the general election voters can select candidates from any party since all parties are present in the voters ballot.

== Process ==
During Maryland gubernatorial elections are elected the state offices, federal offices, and county offices, in each one of them are elected their primary staff.

=== State offices ===
- Governor
- Lt. Governor
- Comptroller
- Attorney General
- State Senator
- House of Delegates
- Judge of the Circuit Court
- Judges of the Court of Special Appeals - For retention in office.
- Judges of the Court of Appeals - For retention in office.

=== Federal offices ===
- United States Senator
- Representatives in Congress

=== County offices ===
- County Executive
- County Council / Commissioner
- County Treasurers
- State's Attorney
- Clerk of the Circuit Courts
- Register of Wills
- Judges of the Orphan's Court
- Sheriff
- Board of Education for each county: Allegany, Anne Arundel, Baltimore County, Calvert, Caroline, Carroll, Cecil, Charles, Dorchester, Frederick, Garrett, Harford, Howard, Kent, Montgomery, Prince George's, Queen Anne's, St. Mary's, Somerset, Talbot, Washington, Wicomico and Worcester County. Voters can cast one votes for every district in their county.

=== Political parties in Maryland ===
There are four political parties in Maryland:

- Libertarian Party of Maryland
- Maryland Democratic Party
- Maryland Green Party
- Maryland Republican Party

On primary elections can be elected candidates of Maryland Democratic Party and Maryland Republican Party. On general elections can be elected candidates of the four political parties in Maryland.

=== Voting process ===
==== Voter registration ====
Voters can register in MVA offices and also with officers in public places such libraries, early voting centers and some schools and is necessary only to be done once, if a voter registered for a primary election does not need to register again for the Gubernatorial election and does not need an ID in order to vote after the voter is registered in the system.

==== Polling place ====
Polling place is specific to each voter according their address, polling place can be looked up on Maryland's State Board of election website, in current election it is accessible from the voting menu and the bottom Polling Place Locator where user is asked to enter its house number or building address, and also its street and zip code. Are early voting centers of each county for early voters and on election day it is only the voter designated polling place, that can be a school or a library, the polling place can be reviewed on the Maryland State Board of Elections website.

==== Early vote ====
Early votes can assist to voting centers from two Thursdays before the primaries and until one Thursday prior primary elections from 10 am until 8 pm, voters can assist to voting centers from two Thursdays before the general elections until one Thursday prior general elections from 10 am until 8 pm,.

==== Maryland's congressional districts ====
The elections are held to elect the candidates in each of the 8 Maryland's congressional districts:

- Maryland's 1st congressional district
- Maryland's 2nd congressional district
- Maryland's 3rd congressional district
- Maryland's 4th congressional district
- Maryland's 5th congressional district
- Maryland's 6th congressional district
- Maryland's 7th congressional district
- Maryland's 8th congressional district

==== Primary election day ====
Primary elections are held on last Tuesday of June, five months before general elections are held. Only democrat and republican voters allowed to vote on primary elections, voters of other parties are not allowed to vote on primaries.

==== General election day ====
General election day is the first Tuesday of the month, on this day are elected Maryland offices, Federal offices, county offices. On general elections, electors can vote for or against constitutional statewide amendments or county wide projects.

==== Ballot ====
The ballot is specific to the address of voters, so there are different ballots for each of the counties in Maryland; in fact, each county could have more than 50 different ballots. Sample ballots are available on the Maryland website on the 2018 Primary Election Proofing Ballots section.

Also will be able to see the "My Candidate Information" section with all the options for vote, among other information, and also will be also to see their specific sample ballot as a PDF file in order to take a better selection researching more on the biography and careers weeks or months before assisting to vote allowing a better election.

Each voter will have an assigned ballot that will be according its address, it can be reviewed online in English and Spanish in the State Board of Elections website, where entering the voter first and last name, date of birth and zip code, and the elector will be able to see its options, that are the following:

- Precinct
- Congressional District
- Legislative District
- Councilman District
- Circuit Court District
- Appellate circuit court
- Central Committee
- Election District
- School
- And Senatorial district.

Voters also will be able to see the "My Candidate Information" section with all the options for vote, among other information, and also will be also to see their specific sample ballot as a PDF file in order to take a better selection researching more on the biography and careers weeks or months before assisting to vote allowing a better election.

==== Voter look-up website ====
Voter look-up website is the official website for voters to find their voters information. In order to access to their information each voter must enter their first name, last name, day of birth and the zip code that appear in their id.

The information that voters can access in the Voter look-up website is the followed:

- My Voter Registration Record: This include the requirement or not of shown an ID in order to vote, Voter name, Voter address, Party affiliation, Registration day
- Polling Place Address and Directions
- My Voting Districts
- My Candidate Information
- My Ballot Questions
- Local Board of Elections information
- Sample ballot: If the sample ballot is not accessible, voters can access the book of general election ballots specific for their county and look for their voting districts in order to find their ballot.

==== Vote in the polling place ====
When electors assist to the polling place are directed to reception area where personal ask to the elector its last name and first name, address and day and month of birthday, after it print a receipt and ask the voter to sign the receipt and instruct to go to the ballot dispensing table, where the voter receive the ballot, that contents three or more ballots, two for elect personal and the other ballot for or against amendments.

After receive the ballot the voter select their candidates with a black pen on the tables and in early votes go to one of the machines for capture the ballot information and where personal receive and staple in order of reception all the voters received. In early voting centers each polling places has more than five voting machines, on day of elections each voting center has only one voting machine.

==== Information about the candidates ====
The information about whom are the candidates running for office can be found in the Gubernatorial Candidate Listings of the Maryland State Board of Elections, also in the League of Women Voters website and in the Maryland Apple Ballot (funded by National Education Association Advocacy Fund).

=== Turnout ===
Number of electors in Maryland in 2018 is 3,931,730 and is projected a turnout of around 50% (2,000,000 voters) with an expected abstention of 50% of electors.

== List of Maryland elections since the Civil War ==
The following is a list of elections for the position of Governor of Maryland since the American Civil War.

Winners are in bold and incumbents are denoted by asterisks.

== Election results by year ==
=== 2022 ===
The 2022 Maryland gubernatorial election was held on November 8, 2022.

- **Wes Moore / Aruna Miller (Democratic) - 1,293,944 (64.5%)**
- Dan Cox / Gordana Schifanelli (Republican) - 644,000 (32.1%)
- David Lashar / Christiana Logansmith (Libertarian) - 30,101 (1.50%)
- David Harding / Cathy White(Working Class) - 17,154 (0.86%)
- Nancy Wallace / Patrick Elder (Green) - 14,580 (0.73%)
- Write-ins - 5,444 (0.27%)

=== 2018 ===
The 2018 Maryland gubernatorial election was held on November 6, 2018.

- **Larry Hogan / Boyd Rutherford (Republican) - 1,275,644 (55.4%)**
- Ben Jealous / Susan Turnbull (Democratic) - 1,002,639 (43.5%)
- Shawn Quinn / Christina Smith (Libertarian) - 13,241 (0.6%)
- Ian Schlakman / Annie Chambers (Green) - 11,175 (0.5%)
- Write-ins - 1,813 (0.1%)

=== 2014 ===
The 2014 Maryland gubernatorial election was held on November 4, 2014.

- **Larry Hogan / Boyd Rutherford (Republican) - 884,400 (51.03%)**
- Anthony Brown / Ken Ulman (Democratic) - 818,890 (47.25%)
- Shawn Quinn / Lorenzo Gaztañaga (Libertarian) - 25,382 (1.46%)
- Write-ins - 4,505 (0.26%)

=== 2010 ===
The 2010 Maryland gubernatorial election was held on November 2, 2010.

- **Martin O'Malley / Anthony Brown (Democratic) - 1,043,724 (56.2%)**
- Bob Ehrlich / Mary Kane (Republican) - 775,661 (41.8%)
- Susan Gaztañaga / Doug McNeil (Libertarian) - 14,124 (0.8%)
- Allwine / Eidel (Green) - 11,809 (0.6%)
- Knowles / Hargadon (Constitution) - 8,596 (0.5%)
- Write-ins - 1,943 (0.1%)

=== 2006 ===
- **Martin O'Malley / Anthony Brown (D) - 942,279 (52.7%)**
- Bob Ehrlich / Kristen Cox (R) * - 825,464 (46.2%)
- Ed Boyd / James Madigan (G) - 15,551 (0.9%)
- Chris Driscoll / Ed Rothstein (P) - 3,481 (0.2%)

=== 2002 ===
- **Bob Ehrlich / Michael Steele (R) - 879,592 (51.55%)**
- Kathleen Kennedy Townsend / Charles R. Larson (D) - 813,422 (47.68%)
- Spear Lancaster / Lorenzo Gaztañaga (L) - 11,546 (0.68%)

=== 1998 ===
- **Parris Glendening / Kathleen Kennedy Townsend (D)* - 846,972 (55.17%)**
- Ellen Sauerbrey / Richard D. Bennett (R) - 688,357 (44.83%)

=== 1994 ===
- **Parris Glendening / Kathleen Kennedy Townsend (D) - 708,094 (50.21%)**
- Ellen Sauerbrey / Paul Rappaport (R) - 702,101 (49.79%)

=== 1990 ===
- **William Donald Schaefer / Melvin Steinberg (D)* - 664,015 (59.77%)**
- William S. Shepard / Lois Shepard (R) - 446,980 (40.23%)

=== 1986 ===
- **William Donald Schaefer / Melvin Steinberg (D) - 907,291 (82.37%)**
- Thomas J. Mooney / Melvin Bilal (R) - 194,185 (17.63%)

=== 1982 ===
- **Harry R. Hughes/ J. Joseph Curran Jr. (D)* - 705,910 (61.99%)**
- Robert Pascal/ Newton Steers (R) - 432,826 (38.01%)

=== 1978 ===
- **Harry R. Hughes/ Samuel W. Bogley (D) - 718,328 (70.98%)**
- J. Glenn Beall Jr./ Aris T. Allen (R) - 293,635 (29.02%)

=== 1974 ===
- **Marvin Mandel/ Blair Lee III (D)* - 602,648 (63.50%)**
- Louise Gore/ Frank B. Wade (R) - 346,449 (36.50%)

=== 1970 ===
- **Marvin Mandel/ Blair Lee III (D) - 639,579 (65.73%)**
- C. Stanley Blair/ Herbert John "Jack" Miller Jr. (R) - 314,336 (32.30%)
- Robert Woods Merkle Sr./ Elbert G. Miller (American) - 19,184 (1.97%)

=== 1966 ===
- **Spiro Agnew (R) - 455,318 (49.50%)**
- George P. Mahoney (D) - 373,543 (40.61%)
- Hyman A. Pressman (I) - 90,899 (9.88%)

=== 1962 ===
- **J. Millard Tawes (D)* - 428,071 (55.64%)**
- Frank Small Jr. (R) - 341,271 (44.36%)

=== 1958 ===
- **J. Millard Tawes (D) - 485,061 (63.55%)**
- James Patrick Devereux (R) - 278,173 (36.45%)

=== 1954 ===
- **Theodore R. McKeldin (R)* - 381,451 (54.46%)**
- Harry C. Byrd (D) - 319,033 (45.54%)

=== 1950 ===
- **Theodore R. McKeldin (R) - 369,807 (57.28%)**
- William Preston Lane Jr. (D)* - 275,824 (42.72%)

=== 1946 ===
- **William Preston Lane Jr. (D) - 268,084 (54.73%)**
- Theodore R. McKeldin (R) - 221,752 (45.27%)

=== 1942 ===
- **Herbert R. O'Conor (D)* - 198,488 (52.55%)**
- Theodore R. McKeldin (R) - 179,204 (47.45%)

=== 1938 ===
- **Herbert R. O'Conor (D) - 308,372 (54.62%)**
- Harry Whinna Nice (R)* - 242,095 (42.88%)
- Herbert Brune (I) - 7,503 (1.33%)
- Joshua C. Gwin (Union) - 4,249 (0.75%)
- David W. Eyman (Socialist) - 941 (0.17%)
- Robert Kadish (Labor) - 759 (0.13%)
- Samuel Gordon (Communist) - 616 (0.11%)

=== 1934 ===
- **Harry Whinna Nice (R) - 253,813 (49.52%)**
- Albert C. Ritchie (D)* - 247,664 (48.32%)
- Broadus Mitchell (Socialist) - 6,773 (1.32%)
- William A. Gillespe (I) - 2,831 (0.55%)
- Bernard Ades (Communist) - 776 (0.15%)
- Harry B. Galantian (Labor) - 719 (0.14%)

=== 1930 ===
- **Albert C. Ritchie (D)* - 283,639 (55.96%)**
- William F. Broening (R) - 216,864 (42.78%)
- Elisabeth Gilman (Socialist) - 4,178 (0.82%)
- Robert W. Stevens (Labor) - 1,358 (0.27%)
- Samuel Parker (Communist) - 855 (0.17%)

=== 1926 ===
- **Albert C. Ritchie (D)* - 207,435 (57.93%)**
- Addison E. Mullikin (R) - 148,145 (41.37%)

=== 1923 ===
- **Albert C. Ritchie (D)* - 177,871 (55.97%)**
- Alexander Armstrong (R) - 137,471 (43.26%)

=== 1919 ===
- **Albert C. Ritchie (D) - 112,240 (49.06%)**
- Harry Whinna Nice (R) - 112,075 (48.99%)
- Arthur L. Blessing (Socialist) - 2,799 (1.22%)

=== 1915 ===
- **Emerson C. Harrington (D) - 119,317 (49.57%)**
- Ovington E. Weller (R) - 116,136 (48.24%)

=== 1911 ===
- **Phillips Lee Goldsborough (R) - 106,392 (50.71%)**
- Arthur Pue Gorman Jr. (D) - 103,395 (49.29%)

=== 1907 ===
- **Austin Lane Crothers (D) - 102,051 (50.66%)**
- George R. Gaither Jr. (R) - 94,300 (46.81%)
- James W. Frizzell (Prohibition) - 3,776 (1.87%)

=== 1903 ===
- **Edwin Warfield (D) - 108,548 (52.01%)**
- Stevenson A. Williams (R) - 95,923 (45.97%)
- William Gisriel (Prohibition) - 2,913 (1.40%)

=== 1899 ===
- **John Walter Smith (D) - 128,409 (51.12%)**
- Lloyd Lowndes Jr. (R)* - 116,286 (46.29%)
- James Swann (Prohibition) - 5,275 (2.10%)

=== 1895 ===
- **Lloyd Lowndes Jr. (R) - 124,936 (54.06%)**
- John E. Hurst (D) - 106,169 (45.94%)

=== 1891 ===
- **Frank Brown (D) - 108,539 (58.06%)**
- William J. Vannort (R) - 78,388 (41.94%)

=== 1887 ===
- **Elihu E. Jackson (D) - 99,038 (53.34%)**
- Walter B. Brooks (R) - 86,622 (46.66%)

=== 1883 ===
- **Robert M. McLane (D) - 92,694 (53.46%)**
- Hart B. Holton (R) - 80,707 (46.54%)

=== 1879 ===
- **William Thomas Hamilton (D) - 90,771 (56.95%)**
- James Albert Gary (R) - 68,609 (43.05%)

=== 1875 ===
- **John Lee Carroll (D) - 85,454 (54.09%)**
- James Morrison Harris (R) - 72,530 (45.91%)

=== 1871 ===
- **William Pinkney Whyte (D) - 73,958 (55.69%)**
- Jacob Tome (R) - 58,838 (44.31%)

=== 1867 ===
- **Oden Bowie (D) - 63,602 (74.40%)**
- Hugh Lennox Bond (R) - 21,890 (25.60%)

== See also ==
- Governor of Maryland
  - List of governors of Maryland
- Elections in Maryland
  - List of Maryland gubernatorial elections
- List of counties in Maryland
- Maryland's congressional districts (8)
- Maryland Senate
- Maryland House of Delegates (141 delegates for 47 districts)
- Maryland Circuit Courts
- List of current members of the Maryland House of Delegates
- List of current members of the Maryland Senate
- Maryland state budget

Current elections

- 2022 Maryland gubernatorial election
- 2022 United States Senate election in Maryland
- 2022 United States House of Representatives elections

== Sources ==
- Maryland State Board of Elections
- Governor - History, OurCampaigns.com
