= William M. Maloy =

American politician (1874–1949)

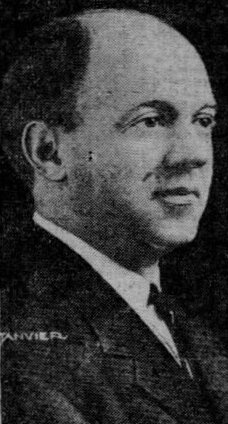
- Maloy in a 1911 newspaper

Member of the Maryland Senate
- In office 1912–1914
- Constituency: District 3 (Baltimore)

Member of the Maryland House of Delegates from the 3rd district
- In office 1908–1909

Personal details
- Born: William Milnes Maloy; October 12, 1874 Blacksburg, Virginia, U.S.
- Died: August 16, 1949 (aged 74) Baltimore, Maryland, U.S.
- Resting place: Green Mount Cemetery
- Party: Democratic
- Spouse: Matilda F. Backus (m. 1913)
- Education: Baltimore City College; University of Maryland School of Law (LLB); Catholic University of America (LLM, LLD)
- Occupation: Politician; educator; lawyer
- Nickname(s): Bill, Paul, Pat

William Milnes Maloy (October 12, 1874 – August 16, 1949) was an American politician, lawyer, and educator from Maryland. He served in the Maryland House of Delegates in 1908 and the Maryland Senate from 1912 to 1914. He was an unsuccessful candidate for Maryland Attorney General in 1915 and for Governor of Maryland in 1926.

== Early life ==
William Milnes Maloy was born on October 12, 1874, in Blacksburg, Virginia, to Margaret (née Hopkins) and William C. Maloy. His father was a Presbyterian minister of the Methodist Episcopal Church, South and served as a chaplain in the Confederate States Army. His parents were originally from Maryland. His mother was from Talbot County, Maryland, and his father was from Queen Anne's County, Maryland. At the age of eight, Maloy and his family moved back to Baltimore. He attended public schools there. He graduated from Baltimore City College as valedictorian in 1894. He then taught for a time in public schools. He was admitted to the bar in 1899. He graduated from the University of Maryland School of Law with a Bachelor of Laws in 1904. He worked for Baltimore and Washington, D.C., newspapers. He later received a Master of Laws in 1907 and a Doctor of Laws in 1909 from the Catholic University of America.

== Career ==
Maloy taught and was principal of the Colored Polytechnic Institute (later the Colored Manual Training School) on Fremont Avenue and King Street in Baltimore. It later merged with the Colored High School. He left the school in 1899 to practice law. In 1904, Maloy formed a law partnership with George Moore Brady. The firm later became Brady, Maloy, and Yost. Maloy specialized in corporate law and was the defendant's lawyer in Diggs v. Morgan College. He was elected as a member of the Maryland House of Delegates, representing district 3 of Baltimore, in 1908. He was defeated for re-election in 1909. He introduced a bill to create a public service commission. He was also an advocate for raising the salaries of judges. In 1910, he was secretary of the Maryland Senate. In 1911, he was chairman of the campaign committee of James H. Preston.

Maloy served in the Maryland Senate, representing district 3 of Baltimore, from 1912 to 1914. In the senate, he helped pass a road bill and a bill that supported state aid for higher education. He also helped plan a state university from the Maryland State Normal School and served as its provost.

In 1915, Maloy was defeated by Albert Ritchie for the Democratic nomination for Maryland Attorney General. From 1915 to 1916, he was a member of the Goodnow Commission on Economy and Efficiency in the State Government. During World War I, he tried to enlist in the United States Army, but was rejected. He served in the United States Department of State under the foreign trade advisor. He was in charge of the Latin-American division. He was appointed by Governor Ritchie as chairman of the Public Service Commission. He served in that role from May 11, 1920, to January 1, 1924. He then resigned that position to serve as People's Counsel. He served as People's Counsel for one year in 1924. He campaigned to reduce telephone rates in 1925 and 1926. In 1926, he ran for the Democratic nomination for the Governor of Maryland, but lost to Albert Ritchie. In 1934, he ran for the Democratic nomination to the United States Senate, but lost to George L. P. Radcliffe. In 1935, he was appointed as executive director of the Unemployment Insurance Law. He remained in that role until 1942. In 1935, he taught constitutional law and conflict of laws at the University of Baltimore.

== Personal life ==
Maloy married Matilda F. Backus, daughter of Fredericka C. and Justus Backus, on September 17, 1913. After they married, they lived on Eutaw Street in Baltimore. They had no children. His nicknames included "Bill", "Paul", and "Pat". He was Catholic.

Maloy died of a heart ailment on August 16, 1949, aged 76, at Johns Hopkins Hospital in Baltimore. He was buried in Green Mount Cemetery.
