= 1940 United States Senate election in Maryland =

- November 5, 1940
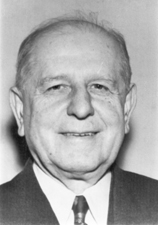

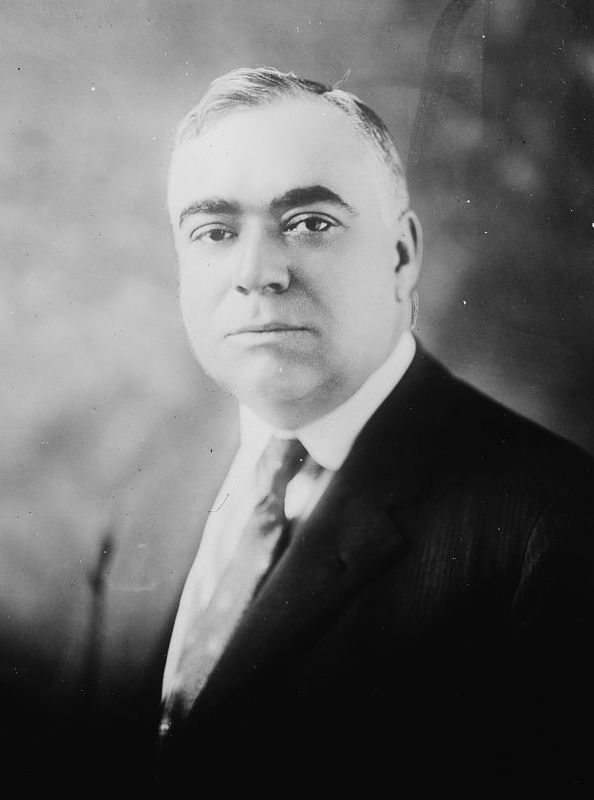
Nominee	George L. P. Radcliffe	Harry Nice
Party	Democratic	Republican
Popular vote	394,239	203,912
Percentage	64.74%	33.48%
- County results Radcliffe: 40–50% 50–60% 60–70% Nice: 40–50% 50–60%
U.S. senator before election
George L. P. Radcliffe
Democratic
Elected U.S. Senator
George L. P. Radcliffe
Democratic

The 1940 United States Senate election in Maryland was held on November 5, 1940.

Incumbent Democratic Senator George L. P. Radcliffe was re-elected to a second term in office, fending off an intra-party challenge from businessman Howard Bruce and easily winning the general election over Republican ex-Governor Harry Nice. This was, since the start of direct popular election of senators, the first election for the Class 1 Senate seat in Maryland when an incumbent senator was re-elected.

== Democratic primary ==
=== Candidates ===
- Howard Bruce, Baltimore County industrialist
- Vincent L. Gierttoski
- George L. P. Radcliffe, incumbent Senator since 1935

=== Results ===
1940 Democratic U.S. Senate primary
Party	Candidate	Votes	%
Democratic	George L. P. Radcliffe (inc.)	175,857	64.11%
Democratic	Howard Bruce	95,757	34.91%
Democratic	Vincent L. Gierttoski	2,695	0.98%
Total votes		274,309	100.00%

== Republican primary ==
=== Candidates ===
- William Frederick Broening, former Mayor of Baltimore, 1919–1923 and 1927–1931
- Harry Nice, former Governor of Maryland, 1935–1939

=== Results ===
1940 Republican U.S. Senate primary
Party	Candidate	Votes	%
Republican	Harry Nice	48,414	60.61%
Republican	William Frederick Broening	31,468	39.39%
Total votes		79,882	100.00%

== General election ==
=== Results ===
1940 U.S. Senate election in Maryland
Party	Candidate	Votes	%	±%
Democratic	George L. P. Radcliffe (inc.)	394,239	64.74%	▲8.64
Republican	Harry Nice	203,912	33.48%	▼8.47
Socialist	Edwin B. Abbott	4,204	0.69%	▼0.60
Independent	David L. Elliot	3,423	0.56%	N/A
American Labor	Robert Kadish	1,848	0.30%	▼0.11
Communist	Albert E. Blumberg	1,349	0.22%	▼0.03
Total votes		608,948	100.00%	
Democratic hold				

=== Results by county ===
County	George L. P. Radcliffe Democratic		Harry Nice Republican		Edwin B. Abbott Socialist		David L. Elliott Independent		Others Others		Margin		Total votes cast
County	#	%	#	%	#	%	#	%	#	%	#	%	Total votes cast
Allegany	17122	53.94%	14250	44.89%	99	0.31%	64	0.20%	208	0.66%	-2872	-9.05%	31743
Anne Arundel	14154	65.80%	7132	33.15%	40	0.19%	103	0.48%	83	0.39%	7022	32.64%	21512
Baltimore (City)	195025	69.03%	81165	28.73%	3158	1.12%	1699	0.60%	1495	0.53%	113860	40.30%	282542
Baltimore (County)	37787	68.63%	16247	29.51%	236	0.43%	595	0.43%	195	0.35%	21540	39.12%	55060
Calvert	2133	52.73%	1867	46.16%	8	0.20%	16	0.40%	21	0.52%	-266	-6.58%	4045
Caroline	3544	58.72%	2431	40.28%	12	0.20%	16	0.27%	32	0.53%	1113	18.44%	6035
Carroll	6835	50.83%	6471	48.12%	21	0.16%	76	0.57%	45	0.33%	364	2.71%	13448
Cecil	3170	35.80%	5553	62.71%	24	0.27%	56	0.63%	52	0.59%	-2383	-26.91%	8855
Charles	2472	49.08%	2482	49.28%	22	0.44%	19	0.38%	42	0.83%	-10	-0.20%	5037
Dorchester	5979	62.78%	3416	35.87%	21	0.22%	45	0.47%	62	0.65%	-2563	-26.91%	9523
Frederick	12451	59.50%	8190	39.14%	37	0.18%	117	0.56%	131	0.63%	4261	20.36%	20926
Garrett	2746	40.63%	3916	57.95%	31	0.46%	21	0.31%	44	0.65%	-1170	-17.31%	6758
Harford	6616	58.57%	4539	40.18%	26	0.23%	54	0.48%	61	0.54%	2077	18.39%	11296
Howard	4464	65.79%	2252	33.19%	9	0.13%	30	0.44%	30	0.44%	2212	32.60%	6785
Kent	3395	61.94%	2035	37.13%	2	0.04%	25	0.46%	24	0.44%	1360	24.81%	5481
Montgomery	17834	61.98%	10389	36.11%	292	1.01%	122	0.42%	135	0.47%	7445	25.88%	28772
Prince George's	16731	67.07%	7927	31.78%	52	0.21%	106	0.42%	130	0.52%	8804	35.29%	24946
Queen Anne's	3791	64.80%	1979	33.83%	11	0.19%	24	0.41%	45	0.77%	1812	30.97%	5850
St. Mary's	2620	58.30%	1806	40.19%	11	0.24%	20	0.45%	37	0.82%	-814	-18.11%	4494
Somerset	3756	49.14%	3768	49.29%	15	0.20%	28	0.37%	77	1.01%	12	0.16%	7644
Talbot	4225	54.45%	3451	44.48%	7	0.09%	22	0.28%	54	0.70%	774	9.98%	7759
Washington	14311	60.35%	9184	38.73%	38	0.16%	97	0.41%	85	0.36%	5127	21.62%	23715
Wicomico	7050	65.64%	3590	33.43%	14	0.13%	35	0.33%	51	0.47%	3460	32.22%	10740
Worcester	3635	60.77%	2238	37.41%	18	0.30%	33	0.55%	58	0.97%	1397	23.35%	5982
Total	385343	63.28%	212781	34.94%	4204	0.69%	3423	0.56%	3197	0.53%	172562	28.34%	608948

==== Counties that flipped from Democratic to Republican ====
- Dorchester
- St. Mary's

==== Counties that flipped from Republican to Democratic ====
- Allegany
- Calvert
- Carroll
- Washington

== See also ==
- 1940 United States Senate elections
- 1940 United States elections
