= 1934 United States Senate election in Maryland =

- November 5, 1934
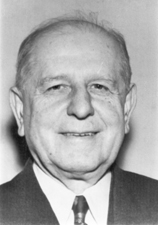

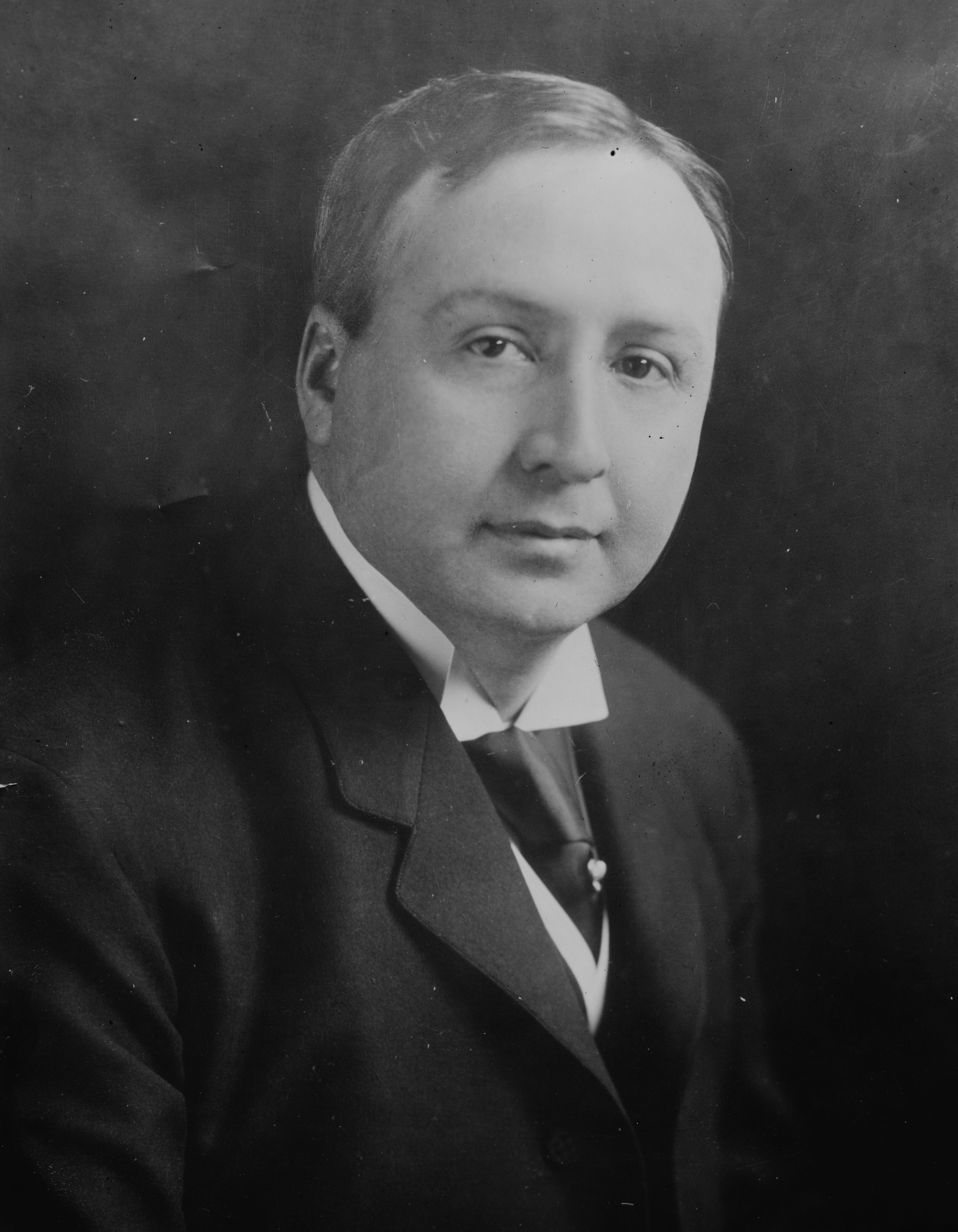
Nominee	George L. P. Radcliffe	Joseph I. France
Party	Democratic	Republican
Popular vote	264,279	197,643
Percentage	56.10%	41.95%
- County results Radcliffe: 40–50% 50–60% 60–70% France: 40–50% 50–60% 60–70%
U.S. senator before election
Phillips Lee Goldsborough
Republican
Elected U.S. Senator
George L. P. Radcliffe
Democratic

The 1934 United States Senate election in Maryland was held on November 5, 1934.

Incumbent Republican Senator Phillips Lee Goldsborough did not seek re-election to a second term in office, preferring to run for Governor of Maryland again. In the open race to succeed him, Democratic Maryland Secretary of State George L. P. Radcliffe defeated former Senator Joseph I. France.

== Republican primary ==
=== Candidates ===
- Joseph I. France, former U.S. Senator from 1917 to 1923
- John Philip Hill, U.S. Representative from Baltimore
- C. Wilbur Miller

=== Results ===
1934 Republican U.S. Senate primary (Note: The source appears to indicate that this race utilized instant run-off voting. However, it is not clear from the source material how the second choice votes were applied, if at all.)
Party	Candidate	Votes	%
Republican	Joseph I. France	34,644	38.70%
Republican	John Philip Hill	28,032	31.31%
Republican	C. Wilbur Miller	26,855	30.00%
Total votes		89,531	100.00%

== Democratic primary ==
=== Candidates ===
- William Milnes Maloy, candidate for governor in 1926
- George L. P. Radcliffe, Maryland Secretary of State

=== Results ===
1934 Democratic U.S. Senate primary
Party	Candidate	Votes	%
Democratic	George L. P. Radcliffe	150,072	71.44%
Democratic	William Milnes Maloy	59,989	28.56%
Total votes		210,061	100.00%

== General election ==
=== Results ===
1934 U.S. Senate election in Maryland
Party	Candidate	Votes	%	±%
Democratic	George L. P. Radcliffe	264,279	56.10%	▲10.86
Republican	Joseph I. France	197,643	41.95%	▼12.10
Socialist	Elisabeth Gilman	6,067	1.29%	▲0.86
Labor	Ada Smith Lang	1,935	0.41%	▲0.12
Communist	Samuel Gale	1,188	0.25%	N/A
Total votes		607,626	100.00%	
Democratic gain from Republican				

=== Results by county ===
County	George L. P. Radcliffe Democratic		Joseph I. France Republican		Elisabeth Gilman Socialist		Ada Smith Lang Labor		Samuel Gale Communist		Margin		Total Votes Cast
County	#	%	#	%	#	%	#	%	#	%	#	%	Total Votes Cast
Allegany	10397	43.39%	12758	53.25%	535	2.23%	54	0.23%	215	0.90%	-2361	-9.85%	23959
Anne Arundel	8887	54.07%	7280	44.29%	184	1.12%	32	0.19%	53	0.32%	1607	9.78%	16436
Baltimore (City)	122522	59.36%	78413	37.99%	4101	1.99%	567	0.27%	809	0.39%	44109	21.37%	206412
Baltimore (County)	23317	58.72%	15818	39.83%	413	1.04%	48	1.04%	114	0.29%	7499	18.88%	39710
Calvert	1664	46.98%	1854	52.34%	10	0.28%	8	0.23%	6	0.17%	-190	-5.36%	3542
Caroline	3325	59.58%	2202	39.46%	11	0.20%	25	0.45%	18	0.32%	1123	20.12%	5581
Carroll	5823	46.37%	6606	52.60%	56	0.45%	23	0.18%	50	0.40%	783	6.24%	12558
Cecil	3891	45.33%	4624	53.87%	21	0.24%	17	0.20%	31	0.36%	-733	-8.54%	8584
Charles	1699	44.29%	2111	55.03%	6	0.16%	7	0.18%	13	0.34%	-412	-10.74%	3836
Dorchester	5058	63.06%	2925	36.47%	9	0.11%	11	0.14%	18	0.22%	-2133	-26.59%	8021
Frederick	9325	49.66%	9166	48.82%	122	0.65%	52	0.28%	111	0.59%	159	0.85%	18776
Garrett	1700	33.21%	3216	62.82%	102	1.99%	36	0.70%	65	1.27%	-1516	-29.62%	5119
Harford	5665	55.30%	4485	43.78%	49	0.48%	16	0.16%	29	0.28%	1180	11.52%	10244
Howard	3771	60.52%	2399	38.50%	20	0.32%	21	0.34%	20	0.32%	1372	22.02%	6231
Kent	2831	56.67%	2134	42.71%	9	0.18%	10	0.20%	12	0.24%	697	13.95%	4996
Montgomery	12024	56.45%	9041	42.45%	119	0.56%	48	0.23%	68	0.32%	2983	14.00%	21300
Prince George's	10646	59.21%	7089	39.43%	88	0.49%	52	0.29%	105	0.58%	3557	19.78%	17980
Queen Anne's	3081	67.82%	1423	31.32%	9	0.20%	21	0.46%	9	0.20%	1658	36.50%	4543
St. Mary's	2204	51.97%	1978	46.64%	15	0.35%	21	0.50%	23	0.54%	-226	-5.33%	4241
Somerset	3657	51.57%	3378	47.63%	13	0.18%	23	0.32%	21	0.30%	279	3.93%	7092
Talbot	3688	56.92%	2761	42.61%	10	0.15%	9	0.14%	11	0.17%	927	14.31%	6479
Washington	9570	49.21%	9617	49.45%	141	0.73%	40	0.21%	78	0.40%	47	0.24%	19446
Wicomico	5832	59.72%	3843	39.35%	16	0.16%	30	0.31%	44	0.45%	1989	20.37%	9765
Worcester	3702	59.13%	2522	40.28%	8	0.13%	17	0.27%	12	0.19%	1180	18.85%	6261
Total	262750	55.77%	199172	42.28%	6067	1.29%	1188	0.25%	1935	0.41%	63578	13.50%	471112

==== Counties that flipped from Republican to Democratic ====
- Anne Arundel
- Baltimore (County)
- Caroline
- Dorchester
- Frederick
- Harford
- Kent
- Montgomery
- Prince George's
- Somerset
- Talbot
- Wicomico
- Worcester

== See also ==
- 1934 United States Senate elections
- 1934 United States elections
