= 1934 Maryland gubernatorial election =

- November 6, 1934
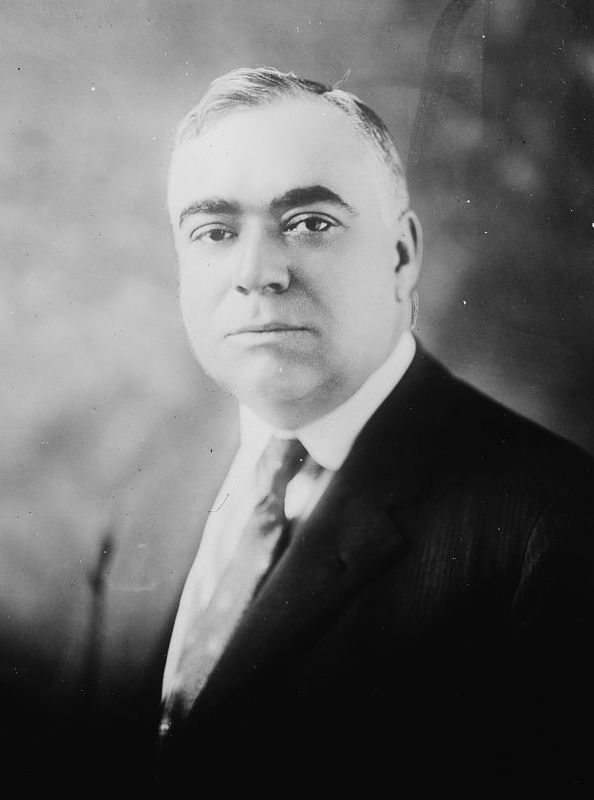

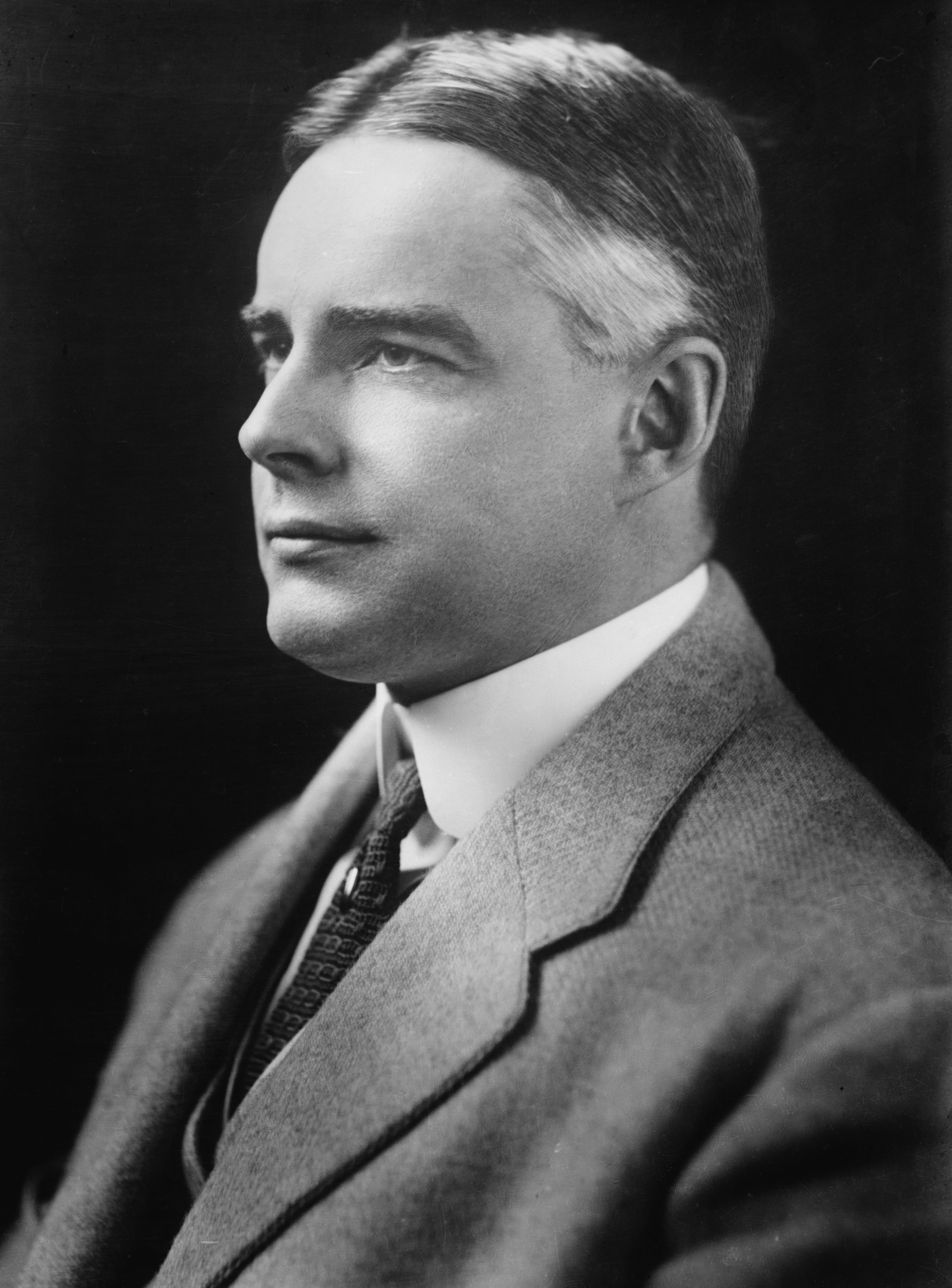
Nominee	Harry Nice	Albert Ritchie
Party	Republican	Democratic
Popular vote	253,813	247,664
Percentage	49.52%	48.32%
- County results Nice: 50–60% 60–70% Ritchie: 40–50% 50–60%
Governor before election
Albert Ritchie
Democratic
Elected Governor
Harry Nice
Republican

The 1934 Maryland gubernatorial election was held on November 6, 1934. Republican nominee Harry Nice defeated Democratic incumbent Albert Ritchie with 49.52% of the vote in a rematch of the 1919 election.

== Primary elections ==
Primary elections were held on September 8, 1934.

=== Republican primary ===
==== Candidates ====
- Harry Nice, former Judge of the Appeals Tax Court of Baltimore City and nominee for Governor in 1919
- Phillips Lee Goldsborough, incumbent United States Senator
- H. Webster Smith

==== Results ====
Republican primary results
Party	Candidate	Votes	%
Republican	Harry Nice	55,157	52.91
Republican	Phillips Lee Goldsborough	31,012	29.75
Republican	H. Webster Smith	18,073	17.34
Total votes		104,242	100.00

== General election ==
=== Candidates ===
- Bernard Ades, criminal defense attorney (Communist)
- Harry B. Galantian (Independent)
- William A. Gillespe (Independent)
- Broadus Mitchell, Johns Hopkins University economics professor (Socialist)
- Harry Nice, former Judge of the Appeals Tax Court of Baltimore City and nominee for Governor in 1919 (Republican)
- Albert Ritchie, incumbent Governor since 1920 (Democratic)

=== Results ===
1934 Maryland gubernatorial election
Party	Candidate	Votes	%	±%
Republican	Harry Nice	253,813	49.52%	
Democratic	Albert Ritchie (incumbent)	247,664	48.32%	
Socialist	Broadus Mitchell	6,773	1.32%	
Independent	William A. Gillespe	2,831	0.55%	
Communist	Bernard Ades	776	0.15%	
Independent	Harry B. Galantian	719	0.14%	
Majority		6,149		
Turnout				
Republican gain from Democratic		Swing		
