= 1928 United States Senate election in Maryland =

- November 5, 1928
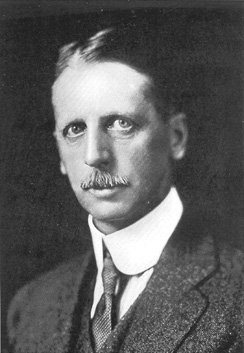

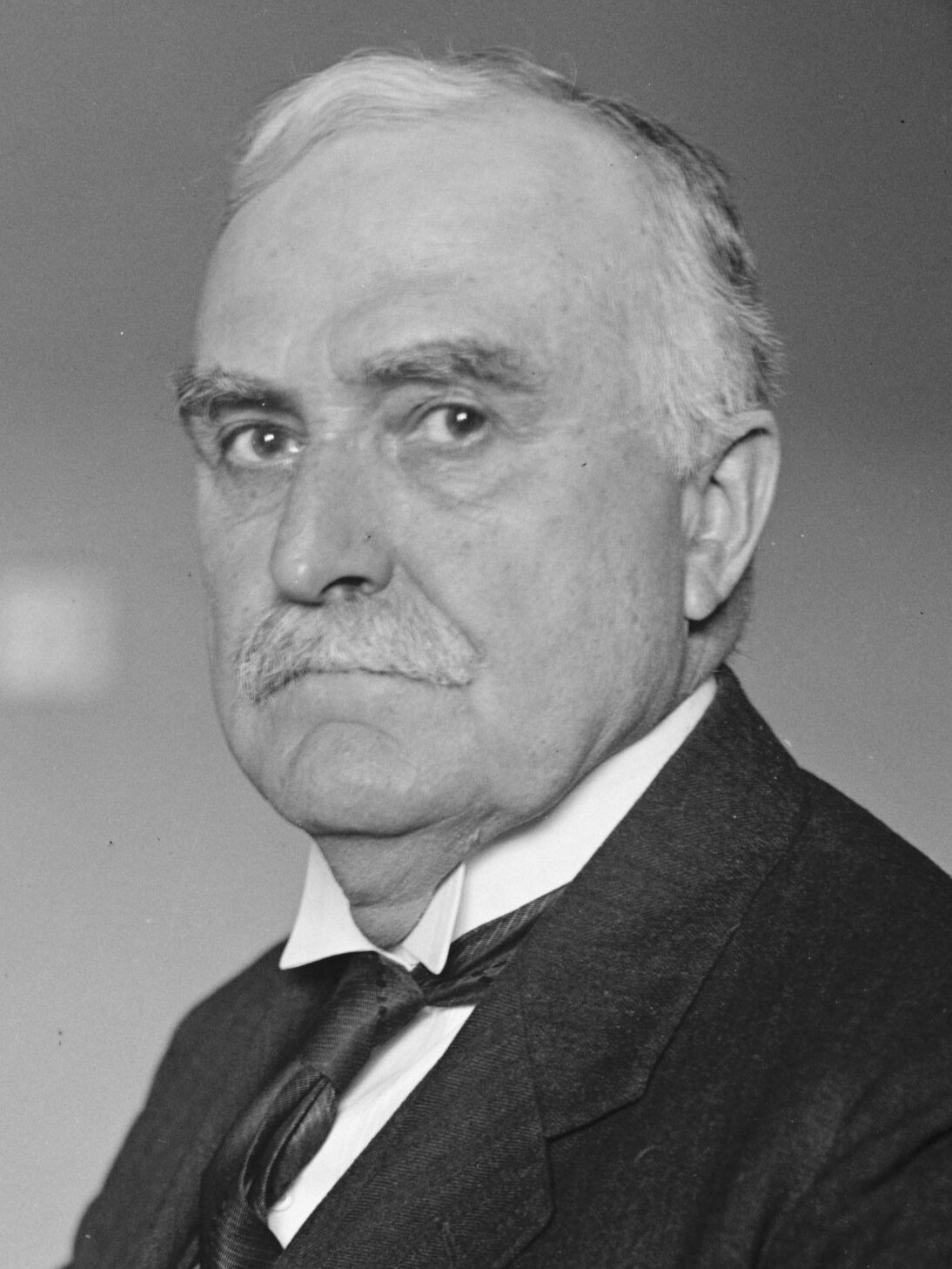
Nominee	Phillips Lee Goldsborough	William Cabell Bruce
Party	Republican	Democratic
Popular vote	256,224	214,447
Percentage	54.05%	45.24%
- County results Goldsborough: 50–60% 60–70% 70–80% Bruce: 50–60% 60–70%
U.S. senator before election
William Cabell Bruce
Democratic
Elected U.S. Senator
Phillips Lee Goldsborough
Republican

The 1928 United States Senate election in Maryland was held on November 5, 1928.

Incumbent Democratic Senator William Cabell Bruce ran for re-election to a second term in office, but was defeated by Republican former Governor Phillips Lee Goldsborough, who had been a failed candidate for Senate in 1916.

This is the last time a Republican not named Beall has won this seat, and the last time until 1952 that a Republican would be elected to the Class 1 Senate seat in Maryland.

== Democratic primary ==
=== Candidates ===
- William Cabell Bruce, incumbent Senator since 1923
- Virginia Peters-Parkhurst

=== Results ===
1928 Democratic U.S. Senate primary
Party	Candidate	Votes	%
Democratic	William Cabell Bruce (inc.)	47,507	88.75%
Democratic	Virginia Peters-Parkhurst	6,020	11.25%
Total votes		53,527	100.00%

== General election ==
=== Results ===
1928 U.S. Senate election in Maryland
Party	Candidate	Votes	%	±%
Republican	Phillips Lee Goldsborough	256,224	54.05%	▲8.42
Democratic	William Cabell Bruce (inc.)	214,447	45.24%	▼7.37
Socialist	William A. Toole	2,026	0.43%	▼0.38
Labor	Robert W. Stevens	1,370	0.29%	▼0.66
Total votes		474,067	100.00%	
Republican gain from Democratic				

=== Results by county ===
County	Phillips Lee Goldsborough Republican		William Cabell Bruce Democratic		William A. Toole Socialist		Robert W. Stevens Labor		Margin		Total Votes Cast
County	#	%	#	%	#	%	#	%	#	%	Total Votes Cast
Allegany	15541	65.39%	7906	33.27%	194	0.82%	124	0.52%	7635	32.13%	23765
Anne Arundel	8320	57.53%	6040	41.76%	44	0.30%	58	0.40%	2280	15.77%	14462
Baltimore (City)	117963	48.90%	121375	50.31%	1330	0.55%	567	0.24%	-3412	-1.41%	241235
Baltimore (County)	18773	55.04%	15189	44.53%	90	0.26%	57	0.26%	3584	10.51%	34109
Calvert	1746	64.21%	933	34.31%	18	0.66%	22	0.81%	813	29.90%	2719
Caroline	2669	59.76%	1780	39.86%	6	0.13%	11	0.25%	889	19.91%	4466
Carroll	7538	66.24%	3798	33.38%	20	0.18%	23	0.20%	3740	32.87%	11379
Cecil	4493	66.29%	2248	33.17%	19	0.28%	18	0.27%	2245	33.12%	6778
Charles	2249	57.43%	1615	41.24%	16	0.41%	36	0.92%	634	16.19%	3916
Dorchester	6203	77.45%	1784	22.27%	8	0.10%	14	0.17%	4419	55.18%	8009
Frederick	10978	59.87%	7268	39.64%	32	0.17%	58	0.32%	3710	20.23%	18336
Garrett	3245	76.03%	1002	23.48%	9	0.21%	12	0.28%	2243	52.55%	4268
Harford	5355	58.38%	3767	41.07%	26	0.28%	25	0.27%	1588	17.31%	9173
Howard	2753	48.83%	2859	50.71%	3	0.05%	23	0.41%	-106	-1.88%	5638
Kent	2496	51.08%	2307	47.22%	69	1.41%	14	0.29%	189	3.87%	4886
Montgomery	7810	52.35%	6973	46.74%	42	0.28%	94	0.63%	837	5.61%	14919
Prince George's	8137	58.01%	5796	41.32%	47	0.34%	47	0.34%	2341	16.69%	14027
Queen Anne's	2117	44.28%	2637	55.16%	4	0.08%	23	0.48%	-520	-10.88%	4781
St. Mary's	1214	35.11%	2196	63.50%	21	0.61%	27	0.78%	-982	-28.40%	3458
Somerset	4009	65.82%	2082	34.18%	0	0.00%	0	0.00%	1927	31.64%	6091
Talbot	3666	59.39%	2478	40.14%	7	0.11%	22	0.36%	1188	19.25%	6173
Washington	10652	62.14%	6374	37.18%	58	0.34%	58	0.34%	4278	24.96%	17142
Wicomico	5087	55.96%	3972	43.70%	15	0.17%	16	0.18%	1115	12.27%	9090
Worcester	3210	60.42%	2071	38.98%	11	0.21%	21	0.40%	1139	21.44%	5313
Total	256224	54.15%	213468	45.12%	2089	0.44%	1370	0.29%	42756	9.04%	473151

==== Counties that flipped from Democratic to Republican ====
- Anne Arundel
- Baltimore (County)
- Caroline
- Carroll
- Frederick
- Kent
- Montgomery
- Prince George's
- Somerset
- Talbot
- Washington
- Wicomico
- Worcester

==== Counties that flipped from Republican to Democratic ====
- Queen Anne's

== See also ==
- 1928 United States Senate elections
- 1928 United States elections
