= 1930 Maryland gubernatorial election =

- November 4, 1930
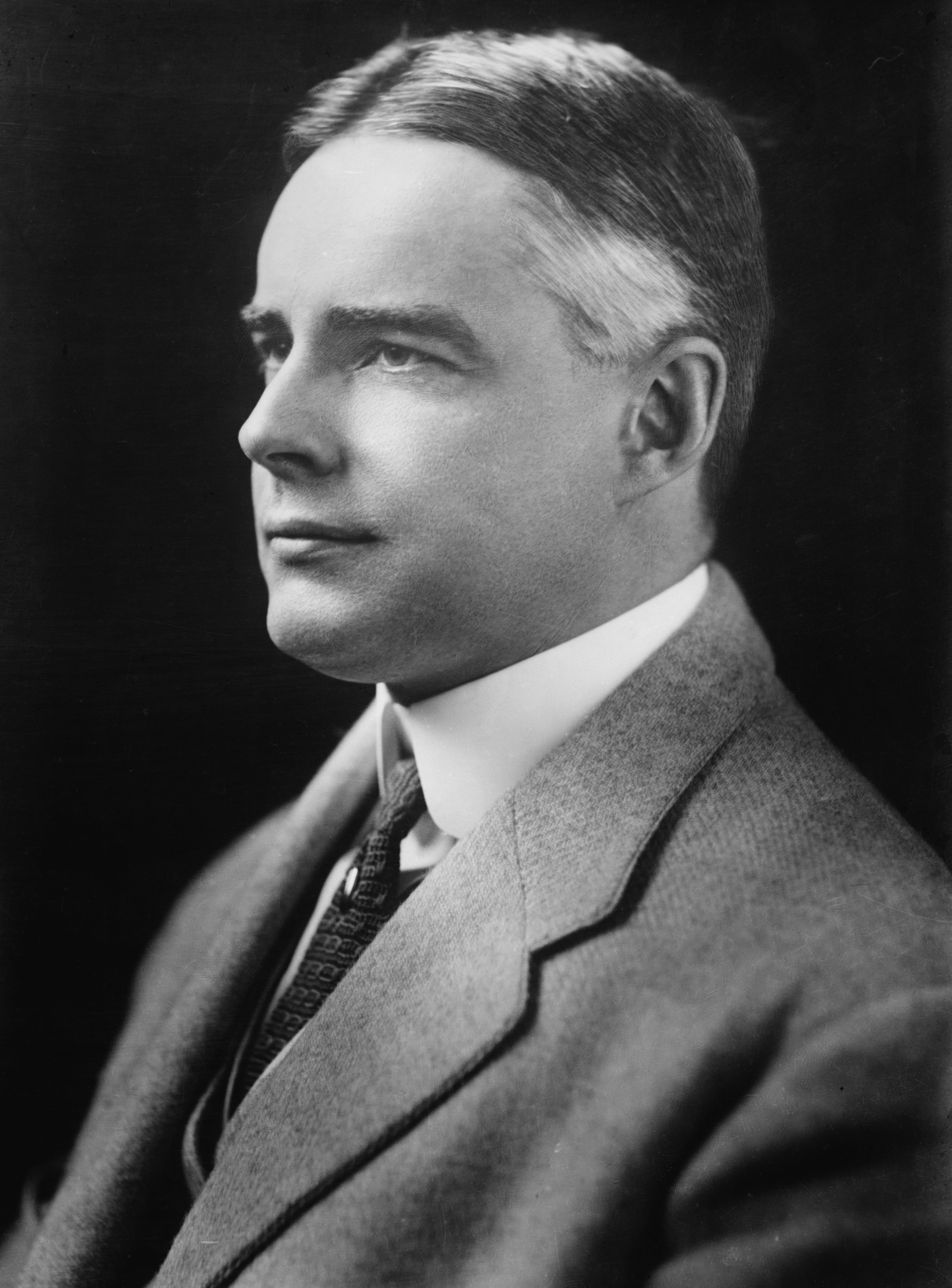

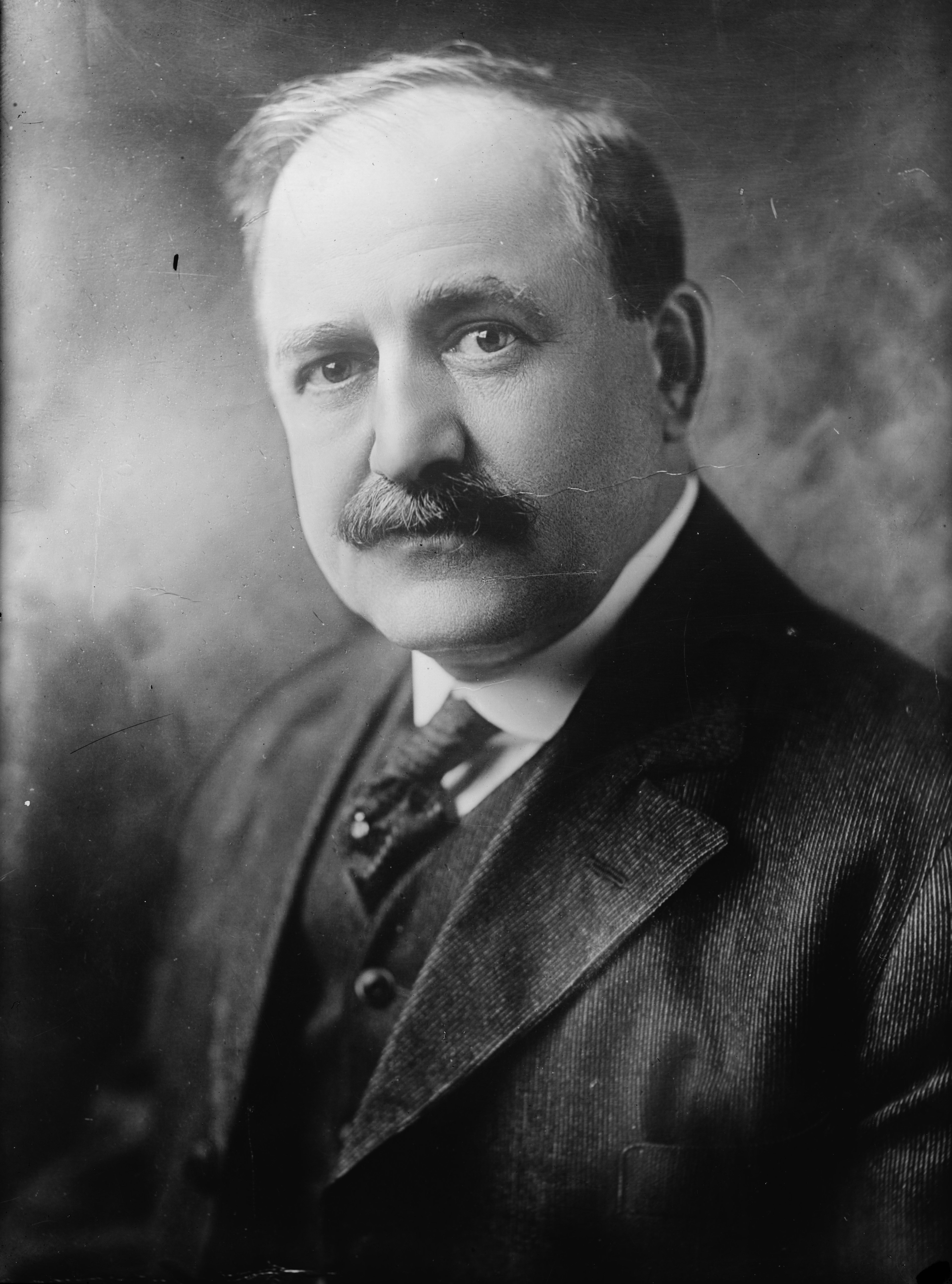
| Nominee | Albert Ritchie | William Frederick Broening |
| Party | Democratic | Republican |
| Popular vote | 283,639 | 216,864 |
| Percentage | 55.96% | 42.78% |
- County results Ritchie: 40–50% 50–60% 60–70% Broening: 40–50% 50–60% 60–70%
Governor before election
Albert Ritchie
Democratic
Elected Governor
Albert Ritchie
Democratic

The 1930 Maryland gubernatorial election was held on November 4, 1930. Incumbent Democrat Albert Ritchie defeated Republican nominee William Frederick Broening with 55.96% of the vote.

== General election ==
=== Candidates ===
- William Frederick Broening, mayor of Baltimore since 1927 (Note: Broening previously served as mayor from 1919 to 1923.) (Republican)
- Elisabeth Gilman, activist (Socialist)
- Samuel Parker (Communist)
- Albert Ritchie, incumbent Governor since 1920 (Democratic)
- Robert W. Stevens (Independent)

=== Results ===
1930 Maryland gubernatorial election
| Party | Candidate | Votes | % | ±% |
|---|---|---|---|---|
| Democratic | Albert Ritchie (incumbent) | 283,639 | 55.96% | |
| Republican | William Frederick Broening | 216,864 | 42.78% | |
| Socialist | Elisabeth Gilman | 4,178 | 0.82% | |
| Independent | Robert W. Stevens | 1,358 | 0.27% | |
| Communist | Samuel Parker | 855 | 0.17% | |
| Majority | | 66,775 | | |
| Turnout | | | | |
| Democratic hold | | Swing | | |
