= Alexander Armstrong (Maryland politician) =

American politician (1877–1939)

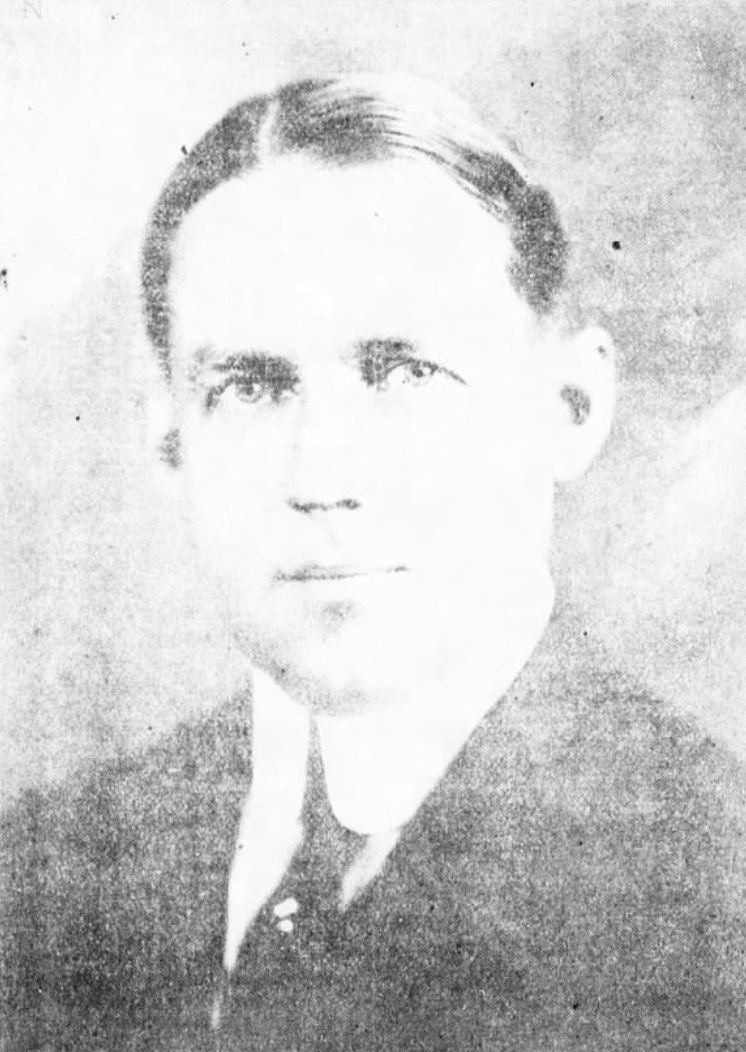
- Armstrong in 1919

Attorney General of Maryland
- In office 1919–1923
- Governor: Emerson C. Harrington; Albert Ritchie
- Preceded by: Ogle Marbury (acting)
- Succeeded by: Thomas H. Robinson

Personal details
- Born: Alexander Armstrong III; June 28, 1877 Hagerstown, Maryland, U.S.
- Died: November 20, 1939 (aged 62) Ruxton, Baltimore County, Maryland, U.S.
- Resting place: Rose Hill Cemetery; Hagerstown, Maryland, U.S.
- Party: Republican
- Spouse: Mary Rebekah Woods (m. 1911)
- Children: 1
- Relatives: Bess Armstrong (granddaughter)
- Education: Princeton University (BA, MA); University of Pennsylvania Law School (LLB)
- Occupation: Politician; lawyer; bank president

Alexander Armstrong III (June 28, 1877 – November 20, 1939) was an American politician and lawyer from Maryland. He served as Attorney General of Maryland from 1919 to 1923. He was the Republican candidate for Maryland Governor in the 1923 election.

== Early life ==
Alexander Armstrong III was born on June 28, 1877, in Hagerstown, Maryland, to Elizabeth Key (née Scott) and Alexander Armstrong. Armstrong graduated as valedictorian from Hagerstown High School. He graduated from Princeton University with a Bachelor of Arts in 1899 and a Master of Arts in 1900. He graduated from the University of Pennsylvania Law School with a Bachelor of Laws in 1903. He was admitted to the bar in 1904.

== Career ==
Armstrong practiced law in Hagerstown and Baltimore. He was affiliated with the Baltimore firm Armstrong, Machen & Allen. He was city attorney of Hagerstown from 1904 to 1906. He was state's attorney for Washington County from January 1, 1908, to January 1, 1912. He was president of the Board of Supervisors of Elections of Washington County from 1912 to 1916. He was elected as Attorney General of Maryland in 1919, defeating Thomas J. Keating. He served until 1923. He was the Republican candidate for Maryland Governor in the 1923 election and was defeated by incumbent Governor Albert Ritchie. He was a delegate to the 1924 Republican National Convention. From 1924 to his death, Armstrong served on the State Board of Law Examiners. In 1928, Armstrong was counsel during the Maryland legislature's State Roads Scandal of 1928.

Armstrong was president of the First National Bank of Hagerstown. He was president of The Armstrong Company, a manufacturer of putties and plastic cements, in Detroit, Michigan. He served as president of the Maryland State Bar Association from 1926 to 1927 and president of the Maryland Bankers Association from 1930 to 1931. Armstrong was director and a member of the executive committee of the board of the Chesapeake and Potomac Telephone Company. He also served as director of the Potomac Edison Company, the New Amsterdam Casualty Company and the Blue Ridge Fire Insurance Company. He was a director of the Baltimore Library Association and a member of the board of visitors of the Severn School.

== Personal life ==
Armstrong married Mary Rebekah Woods, daughter of Dr. Hiram Woods, on January 25, 1911, in Baltimore. His brother also married the daughter of Dr. Woods. Armstrong and his wife had one son, Alexander Jr. His wife died on December 21, 1938. Later in life, Armstrong leased his home in Hagerstown and lived in Baltimore County. His granddaughter is actress Bess Armstrong.

Armstrong died on November 20, 1939, at his house on Boyce Avenue in Ruxton, Baltimore County. He was buried at Rose Hill Cemetery in Hagerstown.

== Awards and legacy ==
Armstrong received an honorary Doctor of Laws degree from the University of Maryland in 1923.

Political offices
Preceded by Harry Whinna Nice	Republican nominee for Governor of Maryland; 1923	Succeeded by Addison E. Mullikin
