= Broadus Mitchell =

American economist

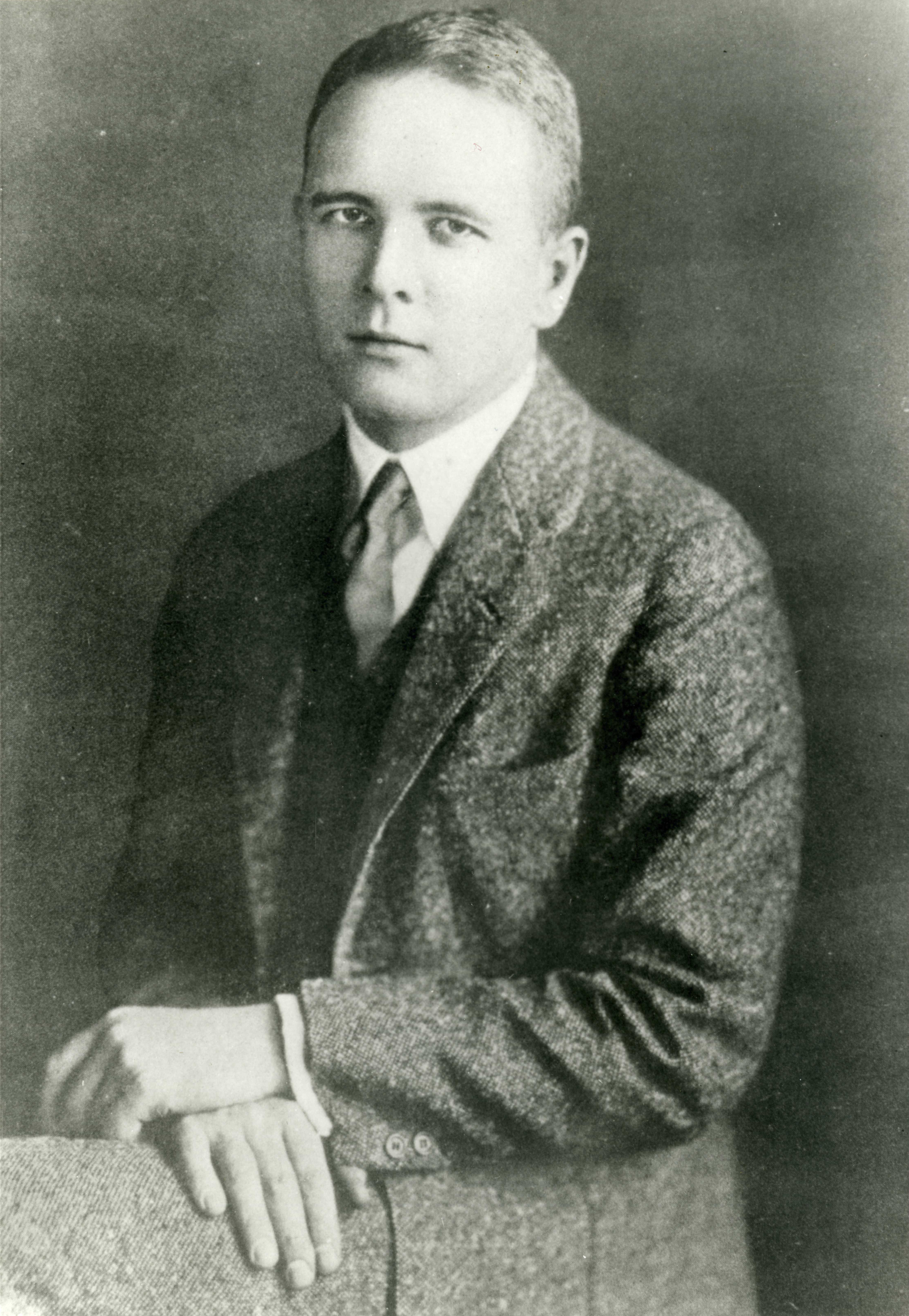
Mitchell in 1922

Broadus Mitchell (December 27, 1892 – April 28, 1988) was a 20th-century American historian, writer, professor, and 1934 Socialist Party candidate for governor of Maryland.

== Background ==
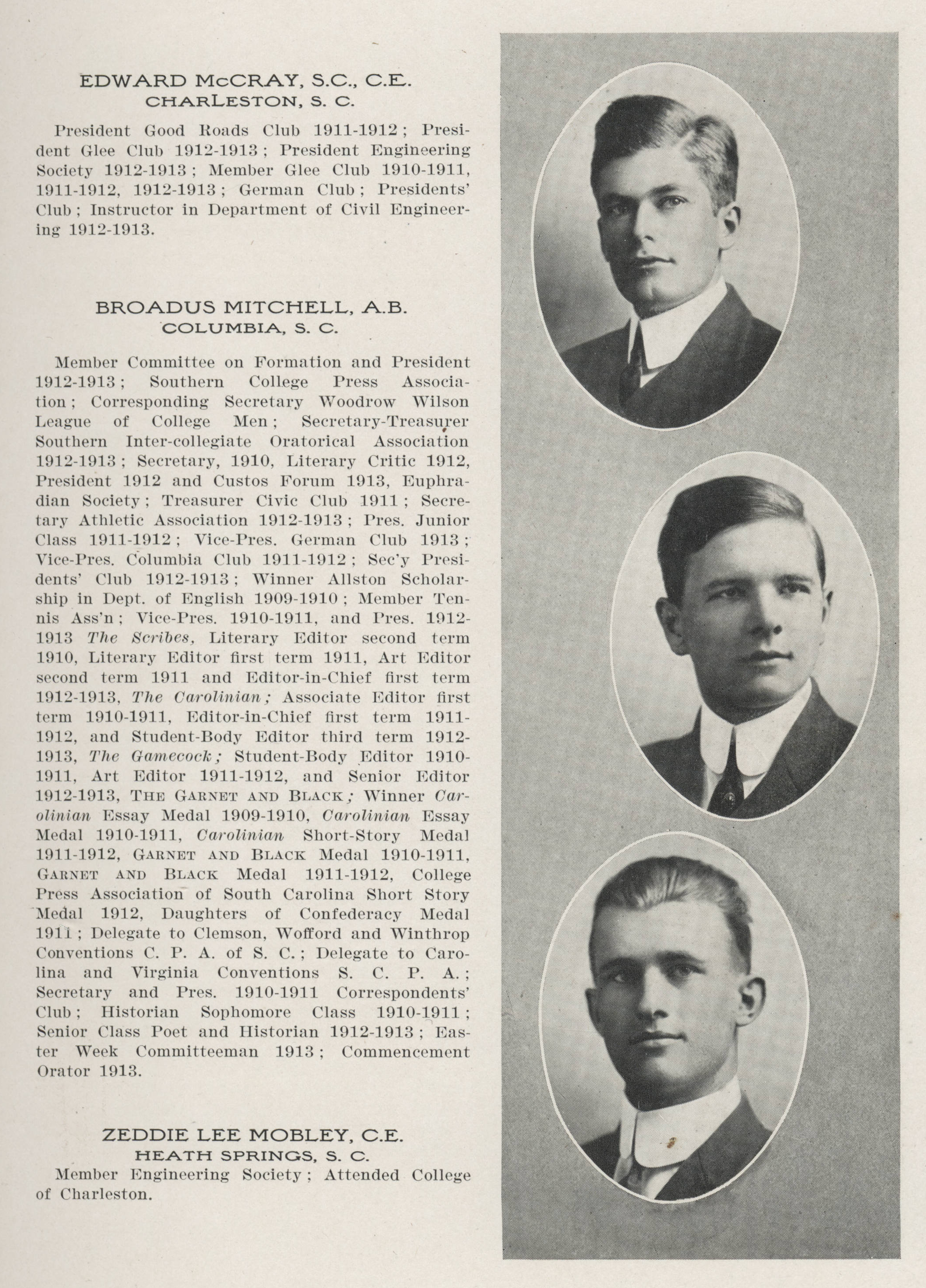
Mitchell (center) in the University of South Carolina yearbook, 1913

John Broadus Mitchell was born on December 27, 1892, in Georgetown, Kentucky. His father was a professor of classical languages. He had three siblings. In 1913, he graduated from the University of South Carolina and in 1918 earned a Ph.D. from Johns Hopkins University.

== Career ==
Mitchell was primarily a university professor and taught for a half century.

=== Academia ===
Mitchell was a professor of economics at Johns Hopkins, as well as instructor at the Baltimore Labor College, at the Bryn Mawr Summer School for Women Workers in Industry, and also the Southern Summer School for Women Workers in Sweet Briar, Virginia, with Lois Macdonald under Louise Leonard McLaren. In 1922, Mitchell was also a member of the advisory board of the Workers' Education Bureau of America.

From 1919 to 1939, Mitchell taught at the Johns Hopkins University. His students included the undergraduate Alger Hiss (who later recalled Mitchell as one of his favorite teachers but denied that Mitchell's Socialism had swayed him). Throughout his tenure at Hopkins, two recurring issues landed Mitchell in trouble with the university and opened him up to criticism: first, his radical political and economic views as a socialist, and, second, his outspoken stance supporting equal rights along racial lines. As one source recounts:

In 1932 a lynching occurred in Salisbury, Maryland. Mitchell was bothered that it received very little attention in the newspapers or by the police. Mitchell decided to do some detective work. The story went that a suspected murderer, Euel Lee, had been abducted and was hanged in front of the courthouse. Broadus talked with many members of the Eastern Shore community to obtain some basic ideas on the opinions of the people in that region. To his surprise nearly everyone involved in the event had been named, but no one had been arrested for the murder. This was very typical of the lynchings that plagued the South from Reconstruction to as late as the 1950s. Many of those who were involved were well-known people in the area. Fear of being socially ostracized, or worse, prevented most people from taking any action at all. [...] The most frustrating aspect for Mitchell was the fact that the local officials had done nothing about it. Mitchell appealed to the state, which replied that it was entirely within the jurisdiction of the local police. Taking his research public, Mitchell said, 'I abhor lynching and officials who allow it should be impeached... The Southerners whom I know and esteem do not believe that the Negro must remain dependant upon the white man and they believe in the orderly administration of law as opposed to mob violence.' Later when asked to write about his experiences at Hopkins, Mitchell mentioned his frustrations with the lynching and wrote, 'Not only did Eastern Shore peace officers do nothing to identify and arrest members of the lynch mob, but the Governor and Attorney General were quiescent.' Unlike nearly all white Southerners of his day, Broadus Mitchell was willing to publicly criticize an entire white community for violating the essential rights of a single African American man.

During his time as professor at Johns Hopkins University, those views led to his resignation (1938) over the university's refusal to admit an African American student into the graduate school. The student, Edward Lewis, later headed the New York Urban League.

Mitchell went on to teach at Occidental College (1939–1941), New York University (1942–1944), Rutgers University (1949–1958), and Hofstra University (1958–1967).

=== Politics ===
In 1934, Mitchell ran for governor of Maryland as the Socialist Party's nominee. He finished in third place, receiving 6,773 votes representing 1.32% of the popular vote.

== Personal life and death ==
Mitchell married twice. His second wife was Louise Pearson, who also co-authored American Economic History (1947), A Biography of the Constitution of the United States (1964), and The Price of Independence (1976) with him; she died in 1986. He had three children.

Mitchell served as president of the Baltimore chapter of the National Urban League and chair of the New Jersey Civil Liberties Committee.

Broadus Mitchell died age 95 on April 28, 1988, at Phelps Memorial Hospital in Tarrytown, New York.

== Works ==
Starting in 1957, Mitchell wrote five works on Alexander Hamilton, including a two-volume biography.

Books solo

- The Rise of Cotton Mills in the South. Johns Hopkins Press. 1921.
- Frederick Law Olmsted, a critic of the Old South. Baltimore, MD: Johns Hopkins Press. 1924. Archived from the original on 2017-08-30 – via Questia.
- William Gregg: Factory Master of the Old South. Octagon Books. 1928.
- Depression Decade: From New Era Through New Deal, 1929-1941. Sharpe. 1947. Volume 9 of Economic History of the United States: Holt Rinehart and Winston series
- Heritage from Hamilton. Columbia University Press. 1957.
- Alexander Hamilton: Youth to Maturity, 1755-1788. Macmillan. 1957.
- Alexander Hamilton: The National Adventure, 1788-1804. Macmillan. 1962.
- A Biography of the Constitution of the United States: Its Origin, Formation, Adoption, Interpretation. Oxford University Press. 1964.
- The Price of Independence: A Realistic View of the American Revolution. Oxford University Press. 1974. p. 374.
- Great Economists in their Times (1966) OCLC 970418
- Alexander Hamilton: A Concise Biography. Oxford University Press. 1976. ISBN 978-0-19-501735-9.

Books co-authored with Louise Pearson Mitchell

- American Economic History (1947)
- A Biography of the Constitution of the United States (1964)
- The Price of Independence (1976)

Books co-authored with brother George Sinclair Mitchell

- The Industrial Revolution in the South (1930) ASIN B000P6ER1W

Articles

- "What Can the Workers' Teacher Expect of His Students?" (1921)
