= Phillips Lee Goldsborough =

American politician, 47th Governor of Maryland

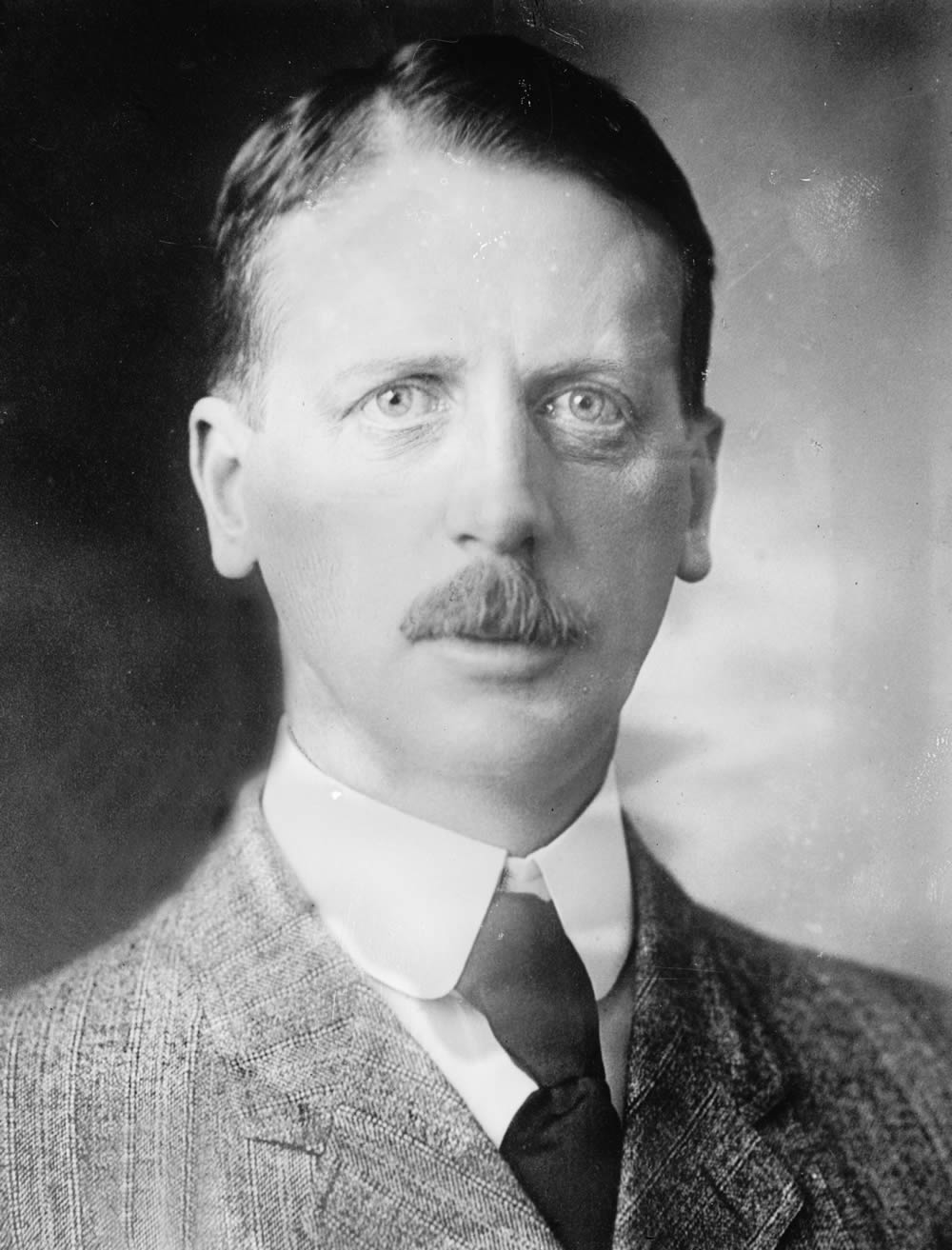

47th Governor of Maryland
- In office January 10, 1912 – January 12, 1916
- Preceded by: Austin L. Crothers
- Succeeded by: Emerson C. Harrington

United States Senator from Maryland
- In office March 4, 1929 – January 3, 1935
- Preceded by: William Cabell Bruce
- Succeeded by: George L. P. Radcliffe

17th Comptroller of Maryland
- In office 1898–1900
- Governor: Lloyd Lowndes Jr.
- Preceded by: Robert Patterson Graham
- Succeeded by: Joshua W. Hering

State's Attorney for Dorchester County
- In office 1891–1898

Personal details
- Born: August 6, 1865 Princess Anne, Maryland, U.S.
- Died: October 22, 1946 (aged 81) Baltimore, Maryland, U.S.
- Resting place: Christ Episcopal Church
- Party: Republican
- Spouse: Ellen Showell (m. 1893; died 1930)
- Children: 3

Phillips Lee Goldsborough I (August 6, 1865 – October 22, 1946), was an American Republican politician who was the 47th governor of Maryland from 1912 to 1916 and represented the state in the United States Senate from 1929 to 1935. He was also Comptroller of the Maryland Treasury from 1898 to 1900. To date, he is the last Republican to serve as Comptroller of Maryland.

== Early life and career ==
Goldsborough was born in Princess Anne, Maryland and was educated in public and private schools, including Episcopal High School. While working as a clerk for the United States Navy, he studied law and was admitted to the bar in 1886, commencing practice in Cambridge, Maryland soon thereafter. He also held an interest in banking. In 1893 he married Mary Ellen Showell (c. 1865 – 1930) and they had two sons: Brice W. Goldsborough and Phillips Lee Goldsborough II.

In 1891 and in 1895, Goldsborough was elected state's attorney for Dorchester County, Maryland. In 1897, he was elected to the position of comptroller of the treasury of Maryland, but was defeated for reelection in 1899 by Dr. Joshua W. Hering. As of 2024, he is the last Republican to have served as Maryland Comptroller.

He was appointed collector of internal revenue for the district of Maryland in 1902 by President Theodore Roosevelt and later by President William Howard Taft.

== Governor of Maryland ==
Goldsborough built a large base of support in the state, which encouraged him to run for Governor of Maryland in 1911. He defeated Democratic challenger Arthur Pue Gorman Jr., becoming only the second Republican governor in state history up to that time. Goldsborough won in part due to the support of African Americans, with the disenfranchising Digges Amendment being concurrently defeated.

Goldsborough's tenure as governor achieved education reform, including the appointment of school boards and teacher certification. It was also during his tenure that the state purchased Maryland Agricultural College, now the University of Maryland, College Park.

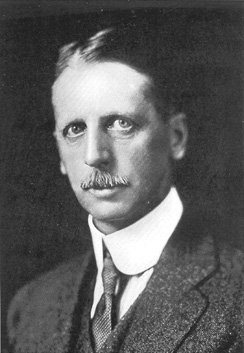
Goldsborough

== United States Senate ==
Goldsborough sought the Republican nomination for the Class I U.S. Senate seat from Maryland in 1916, but was defeated in the Republican primary by Joseph I. France. He left politics afterwards and resumed his law practice in Cambridge, and also became president of the National Union Bank.

When Republican Herbert Hoover was elected President of the United States, Goldsborough again sought the same senate seat in Maryland. He was elected to the United States Senate in the election of 1928, defeating incumbent William Cabell Bruce.

== Later career and death ==
In 1934, he was not a candidate for re-election to the senate, but instead ran again for Governor of Maryland. He lost in the Republican primary to Harry W. Nice, who went on to win the general election.

President Franklin Delano Roosevelt appointed Goldsborough to the director's board of the Federal Deposit Insurance Corporation in 1935. He served in that position until he died in 1946 in Baltimore, Maryland, and is buried in the old churchyard of Christ Episcopal Church of his hometown of Cambridge.

Party political offices
| Preceded by George R. Gaither, Jr. | Republican nominee for Governor of Maryland; 1911 | Succeeded by Ovington Weller |
| Preceded by Joseph I. France | Republican nominee for U.S. Senator from Maryland (Class 1); 1928 | Succeeded by Joseph I. France |
Political offices
| Preceded by Robert Patterson Graham | Comptroller of Maryland; 1898–1900 | Succeeded by Joshua W. Hering |
| Preceded by Austin L. Crothers | Governor of Maryland; 1912–1916 | Succeeded by Emerson C. Harrington |
U.S. Senate
| Preceded by William Cabell Bruce | U.S. senator (Class 1) from Maryland; 1929–1935; Served alongside: Millard Tydings | Succeeded by George L. P. Radcliffe |
