= Maryland State Normal School =

Maryland State Normal School was the former name of two Maryland universities:

- Salisbury University, known as the Maryland State Normal School from 1925 to 1934
- Towson University, known as the Maryland State Normal School from 1866 to 1935
