= 1923 Maryland gubernatorial election =

- November 6, 1923
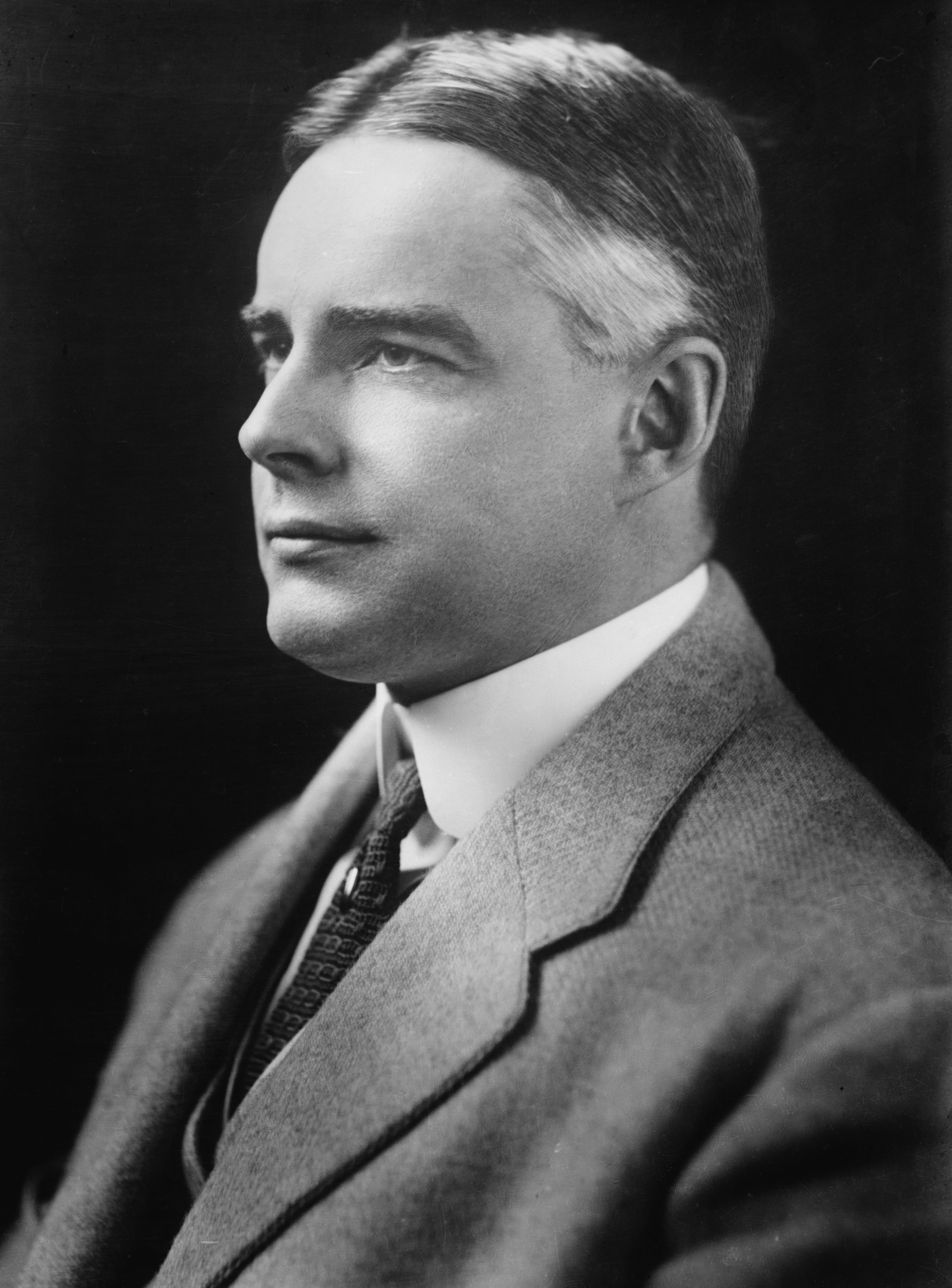

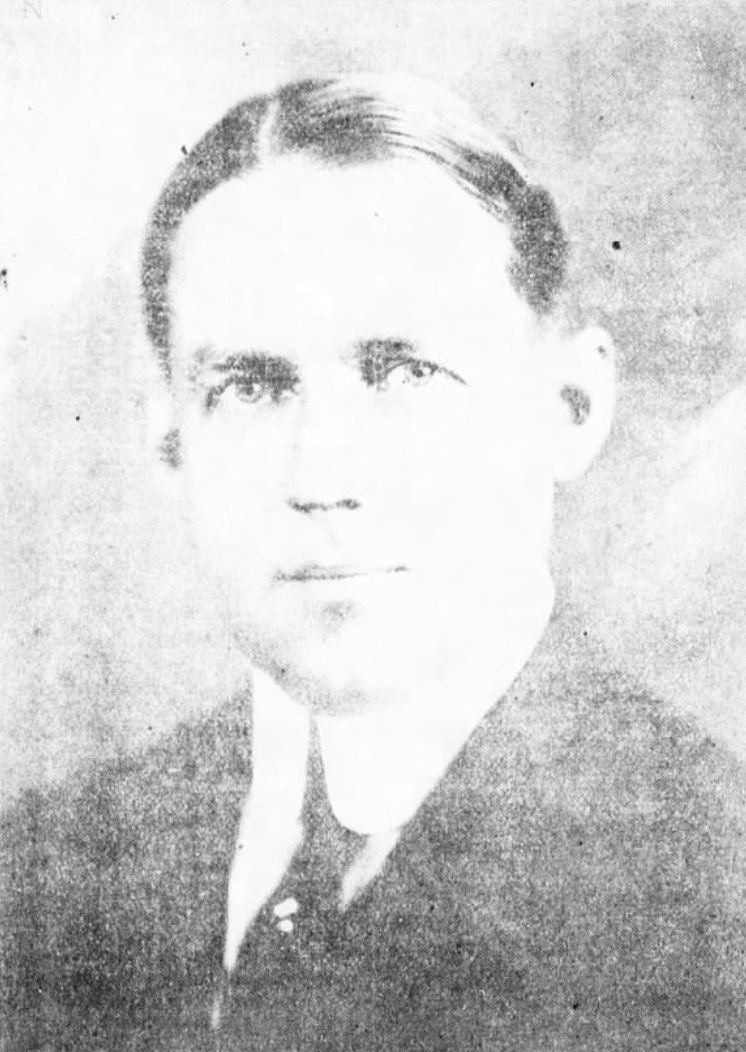
Nominee	Albert Ritchie	Alexander Armstrong
Party	Democratic	Republican
Popular vote	177,871	137,471
Percentage	55.97%	43.26%
- County results Ritchie: 50–60% 60–70% Armstrong: 40–50% 50–60% 60–70%
Governor before election
Albert Ritchie
Democratic
Elected Governor
Albert Ritchie
Democratic

The 1923 Maryland gubernatorial election was held on November 6, 1923. Incumbent Democrat Albert Ritchie defeated Republican nominee Alexander Armstrong with 55.97% of the vote.

== General election ==
=== Candidates ===
Major party candidates

- Albert Ritchie, Democratic
- Alexander Armstrong, Republican

Other candidates

- William H. Champlin, Socialist
- Verne L. Reynolds, Independent

=== Results ===
1923 Maryland gubernatorial election
Party	Candidate	Votes	%	±%
Democratic	Albert Ritchie (incumbent)	177,871	55.97%	
Republican	Alexander Armstrong	137,471	43.26%	
Socialist	William H. Champlin	1,465	0.46%	
Independent	Verne L. Reynolds	968	0.31%	
Majority		40,400		
Turnout				
Democratic hold		Swing		
