= 1938 Maryland gubernatorial election =

- November 8, 1938
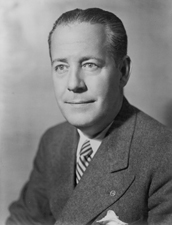

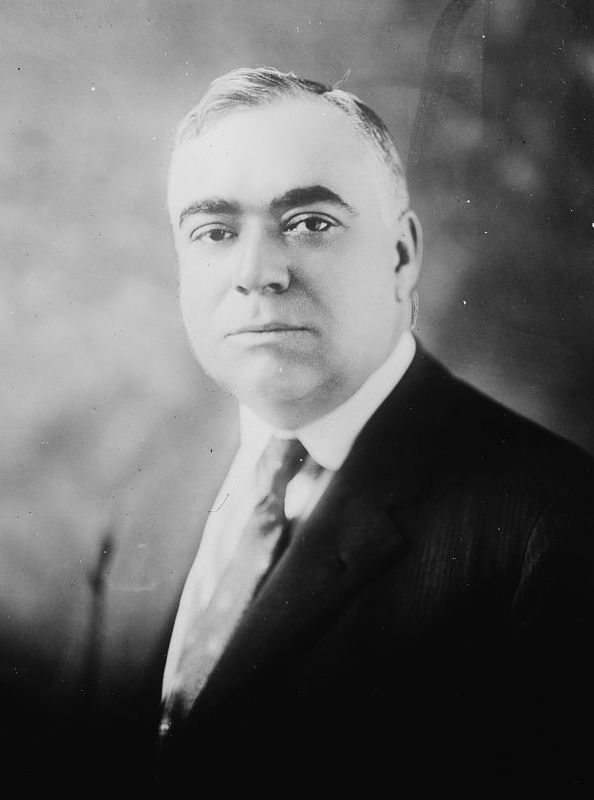
Nominee	Herbert O'Conor	Harry Nice
Party	Democratic	Republican
Popular vote	308,372	242,095
Percentage	54.62%	42.88%
- County results O'Conor: 40–50% 50–60% 60–70% Nice: 40–50% 50–60% 60–70%
Governor before election
Harry Nice
Republican
Elected Governor
Herbert O'Conor
Democratic

The 1938 Maryland gubernatorial election was held on November 8, 1938. Democratic nominee Herbert O'Conor defeated incumbent Republican Harry Nice with 54.62% of the vote.

== Primary elections ==
Primary elections were held on September 12, 1938.

=== Democratic primary ===
==== Candidates ====
- Herbert O'Conor, Attorney General of Maryland
- Howard W. Jackson, Mayor of Baltimore
- William S. Gordy Jr., Comptroller of Maryland
- Lansdale Ghiselin Sasscer, State Delegate

==== Results ====
Democratic primary results
Party	Candidate	Votes	%
Democratic	Herbert O'Conor	147,613	43.32
Democratic	Howard W. Jackson	135,244	39.69
Democratic	William S. Gordy Jr.	34,337	10.08
Democratic	Lansdale Ghiselin Sasscer	23,587	6.92
Total votes		340,781	100.00

=== Republican primary ===
==== Candidates ====
- Harry Nice, incumbent Governor
- Harry T. Phoebus, former State Senator

==== Results ====
Republican primary results
Party	Candidate	Votes	%
Republican	Harry Nice (incumbent)	83,318	84.08
Republican	Harry T. Phoebus	15,771	15.92
Total votes		99,089	100.00

== General election ==
=== Candidates ===
Major party candidates

- Herbert O'Conor, Democratic
- Harry Nice, Republican

Other candidates

- Herbert Brune, Independent
- Joshua C. Gwin, Union
- David W. Eyman, Socialist
- Robert Kadish, Independent
- Samuel Gordon, Communist

=== Results ===
1938 Maryland gubernatorial election
Party	Candidate	Votes	%	±%
Democratic	Herbert O'Conor	308,372	54.62%	
Republican	Harry Nice (incumbent)	242,095	42.88%	
Independent	Herbert Brune	7,503	1.33%	
Union	Joshua C. Gwin	4,249	0.75%	
Socialist	David W. Eyman	941	0.17%	
Independent	Robert Kadish	759	0.13%	
Communist	Samuel Gordon	616	0.11%	
Majority		66,277		
Turnout				
Democratic gain from Republican		Swing		
