= George L. P. Radcliffe =

American politician (1877–1974)

George Lovic Pierce Radcliffe
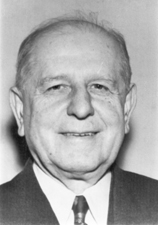

United States Senator from Maryland
- In office January 3, 1935 – January 3, 1947
- Preceded by: Phillips L. Goldsborough
- Succeeded by: Herbert O'Conor

Secretary of State of Maryland
- In office 1919–1920
- Governor: Emerson Harrington
- Preceded by: Thomas W. Simmons
- Succeeded by: Philip B. Perlman

Personal details
- Born: August 22, 1877 Cambridge, Maryland, U.S.
- Died: July 29, 1974 (aged 96) Baltimore, Maryland, U.S.
- Party: Democratic
- Spouse: Mary McKim Marriott (m. 1906)

George Lovic Pierce Radcliffe (August 22, 1877 – July 29, 1974) was a Democratic Party member of the United States Senate who represented Maryland from 1935 to 1947.

== Background ==
Radcliffe was born on a farm at Lloyds, near Cambridge, Maryland. He attended both public and private schools in his youth and later graduated from Cambridge Seminary in 1893, from Johns Hopkins University in 1897, from the graduate school of Johns Hopkins University in 1900, and from the University of Maryland School of Law in 1903.

== Career ==
Following college, Radcliffe took the position of principal of the Cambridge Seminary he had attended as a youth. After a stint as a teacher in the Baltimore City College in 1901 and 1902, Radcliffe was admitted to the bar in 1903 and commenced practice in Baltimore, Maryland with an interest in banking and farming.

During the First World War, Radcliffe joined the Liquor License Commission in Baltimore, serving from 1916 to 1919, and also served as a member of the Maryland State Council of Defense.

=== State Government ===
In 1919, Radcliffe was selected as Secretary of State of Maryland and served until 1920.

=== Federal Government ===
In 1933 and again in 1934, Radcliffe was chosen regional adviser of the Public Works Administration for Maryland, Delaware, Virginia, West Virginia, North Carolina, Tennessee, Kentucky, and the District of Columbia.

=== U.S. Senate ===
In the election of 1934, Radcliffe was elected as a Democrat to the United States Senate, and was subsequently reelected in the 1940 election. Radcliffe failed to achieve re-nomination for his party in the election of 1946, losing to fellow Democrat Herbert R. O'Conor.

== Personal and death ==
Radcliffe resumed banking and farming interests following his tenure as senator and was actively involved in civic life.

He resided in Baltimore until he died on July 29, 1974. He is buried at the Cambridge Cemetery in his hometown.

== Miscellaneous ==
In 1935, Alger Hiss attorney and close friend William L. Marbury, Jr. wrote to Radcliffe to secure his support for the appointment of Hiss to the U.S. Solicitor General's office. (Hiss and Radcliffe were both from Baltimore, graduates of Johns Hopkins University, and officials in Franklin Roosevelt's New Deal government.)

== External sources ==
- United States Congress. "George L. P. Radcliffe (id: R000006)". Biographical Directory of the United States Congress.

Party political offices
Preceded by William Cabell Bruce	Democratic nominee for U.S. Senator from Maryland (Class 1); 1934, 1940	Succeeded by Herbert O'Conor
Political offices
Preceded by Thomas W. Simmons	Secretary of State of Maryland; 1919–1920	Succeeded by Philip B. Perlman
U.S. Senate
Preceded by Phillips Lee Goldsborough	U.S. senator (Class 1) from Maryland; January 3, 1935 – January 3, 1947; Served alongside: Millard Tydings	Succeeded by Herbert O'Conor
Honorary titles
Preceded by John Heiskell	Oldest living U.S. senator December 28, 1972 – July 29, 1974	Succeeded by John Milton
