= 1926 Maryland gubernatorial election =

- November 2, 1926
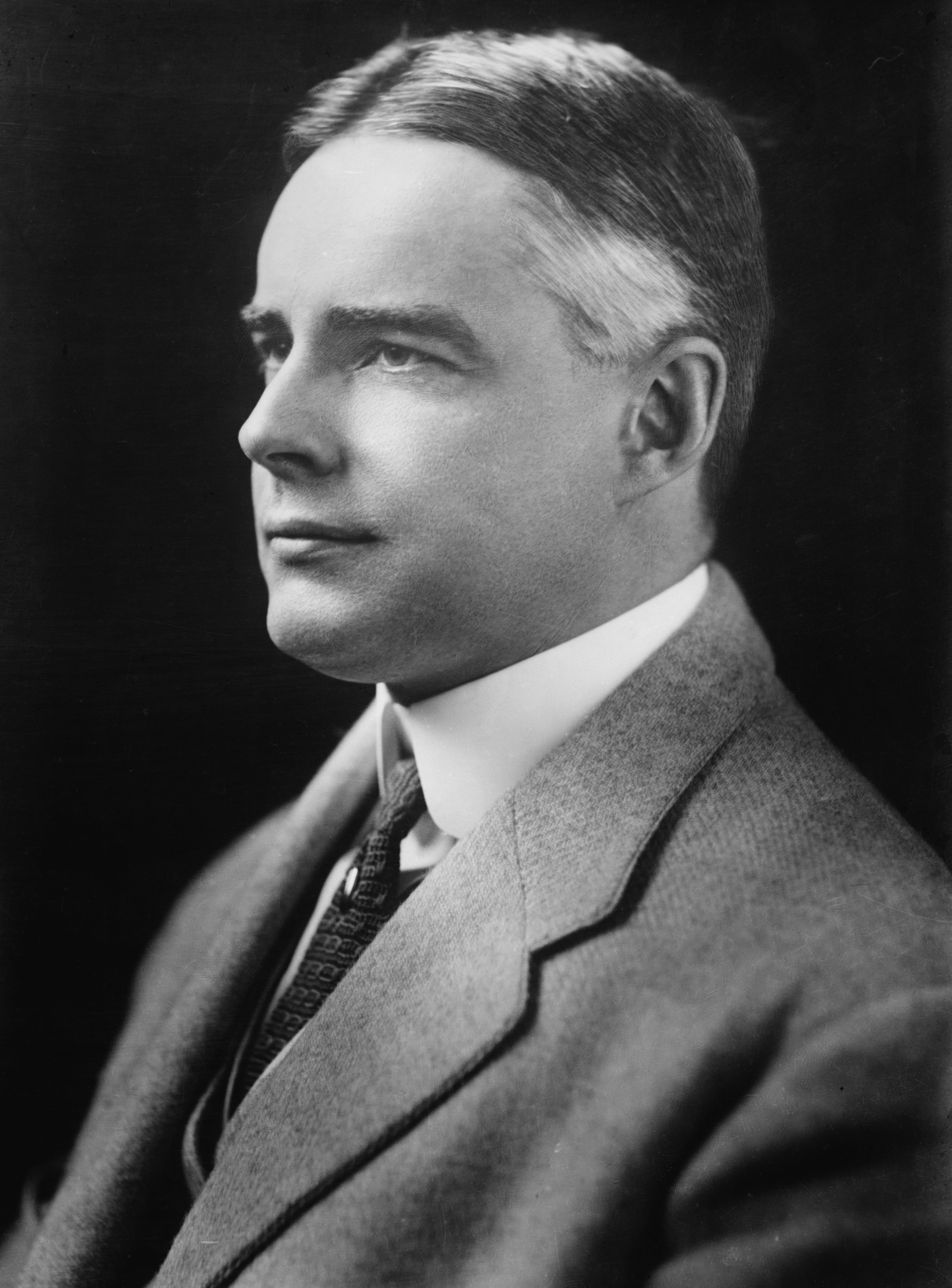

| Nominee | Albert Ritchie | Addison E. Mullikin |
| Party | Democratic | Republican |
| Popular vote | 207,435 | 148,145 |
| Percentage | 57.93% | 41.37% |
- County results Ritchie: 50–60% 60–70% Mullikin: 50–60% 60–70%
Governor before election
Albert Ritchie
Democratic
Elected Governor
Albert Ritchie
Democratic

The 1926 Maryland gubernatorial election was held on November 2, 1926. Incumbent Democrat Albert Ritchie defeated Republican nominee Addison E. Mullikin with 57.93% of the vote.

== General election ==
=== Candidates ===
Major party candidates

- Albert Ritchie, Democratic
- Addison E. Mullikin, Republican

Other candidates

- P. G'ustave Dill, Socialist

=== Results ===
1926 Maryland gubernatorial election
| Party | Candidate | Votes | % | ±% |
|---|---|---|---|---|
| Democratic | Albert Ritchie (incumbent) | 207,435 | 57.93% | |
| Republican | Addison E. Mullikin | 148,145 | 41.37% | |
| Socialist | P. G'ustave Dill | 2,495 | 0.70% | |
| Majority | | 59,290 | | |
| Turnout | | | | |
| Democratic hold | | Swing | | |
