= Harry Nice =

Governor of Maryland from 1935 to 1939

Harry W. Nice
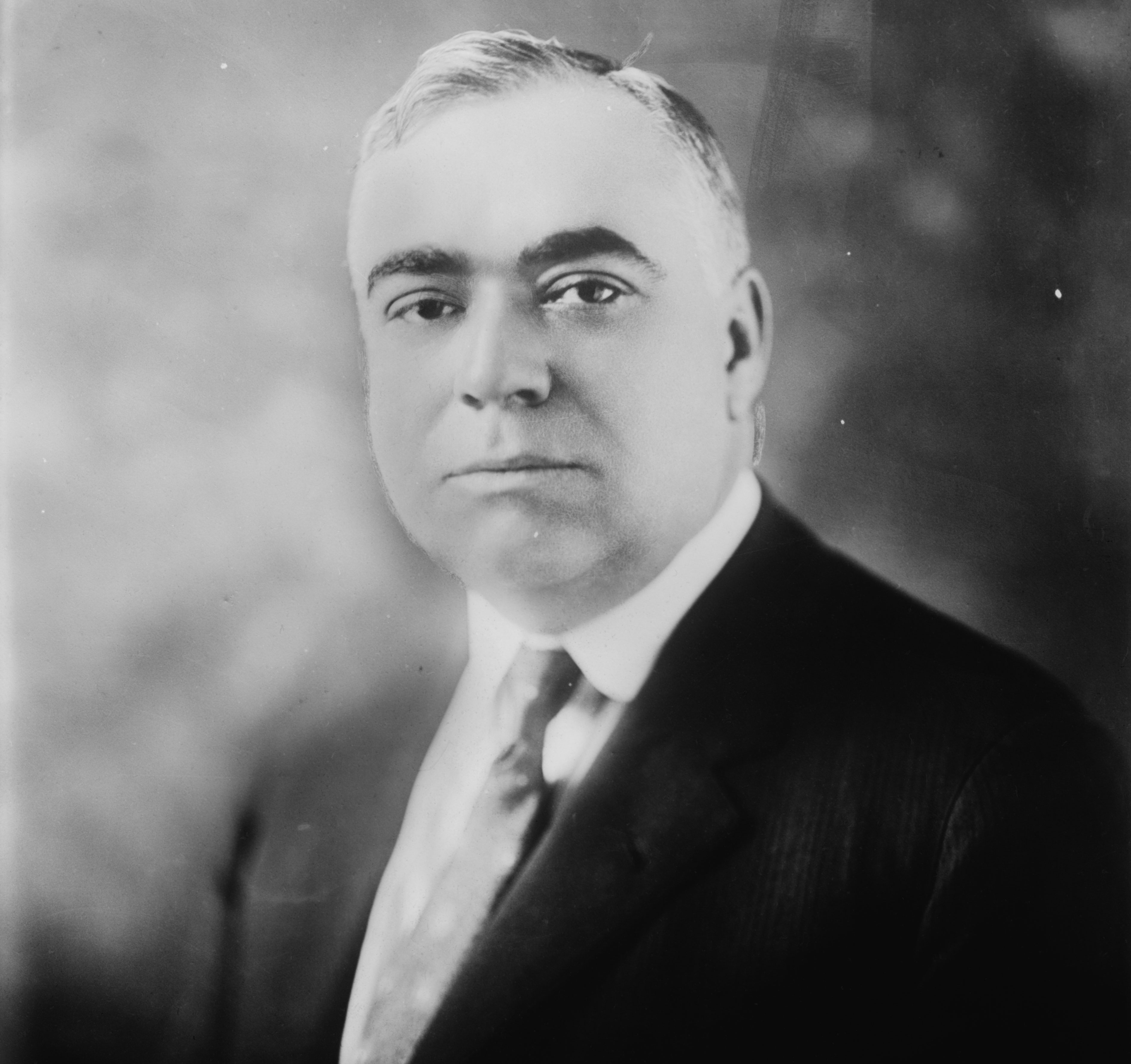

50th Governor of Maryland
- In office January 9, 1935 – January 11, 1939
- Preceded by: Albert C. Ritchie
- Succeeded by: Herbert R. O'Conor

Baltimore City Council
- In office 1903–1905

Personal details
- Born: Harry Whinna Nice; December 5, 1877 Washington, D.C., U.S.
- Died: February 25, 1941 (aged 63) Richmond, Virginia, U.S.
- Resting place: Green Mount Cemetery
- Party: Republican
- Spouse: Edna Viola Amos (m. 1905)
- Children: 2

Harry Whinna Nice (December 5, 1877 – February 25, 1941) was an American politician and a member of the Republican Party who served as the 50th governor of Maryland from 1935 to 1939.

== Biography ==
Harry Whinna Nice was born in Washington, D.C., and raised in Baltimore, Maryland. He later attended Baltimore City College, Dickinson College and graduated from the University of Maryland School of Law in 1899. He was married to Edna Viola Amos in 1905, with whom he had two sons, Harry Jr, and William, who died in childhood.

Nice served as assistant to the State's Attorney in Baltimore, but later resigned to run for the Republican nomination for governor of Maryland in 1919. He lost to Democrat Albert C. Ritchie by a narrow margin. Following the defeat, Nice accepted a position in the Appeals Tax Court of Baltimore City as a judge from 1920 until 1924. In 1934, running under the campaign motto of "Right the wrong of 1919", Nice again challenged Ritchie and defeated him by 6,149 votes.

Nice rose to become governor during the national depression, which brought great financial hardships to the state budget. To help find a solution to the situation, Nice assigned a committee to investigate ways of alleviating the debt, but was not pleased with the recommendations of raising taxes. Neither he nor the Maryland General Assembly felt it would be wise to raise taxes at such a rate. Also as governor, Nice redesigned the governors' residence at Government House, changing the architectural style from Victorian to Georgian.

After losing the support of his party, Nice was defeated by Herbert R. O'Conor in 1938. He attempted to run for the U.S. Senate in 1940, but was unsuccessful and resumed his law practice in Baltimore. He died on February 25, 1941, in Richmond, Virginia. He is buried in Greenmount Cemetery.

== Building dedications ==
- The Harry W. Nice Memorial Bridge connects Charles County, Maryland and King George County, Virginia, over the Potomac River on U.S. Route 301.

Political offices
Preceded by Albert Ritchie	Governor of Maryland; 1935–1939	Succeeded by Herbert O'Conor
Party political offices
Preceded by Ovington Weller	Republican nominee for Governor of Maryland; 1919	Succeeded by Alexander Armstrong
Preceded by William Frederick Broening	Republican nominee for Governor of Maryland; 1934, 1938	Succeeded by Theodore McKeldin
Preceded by Joseph I. France	Republican nominee for United States Senator from Maryland (Class 1); 1940	Succeeded by D. John Markey
