= 1919 Maryland gubernatorial election =

- November 4, 1919
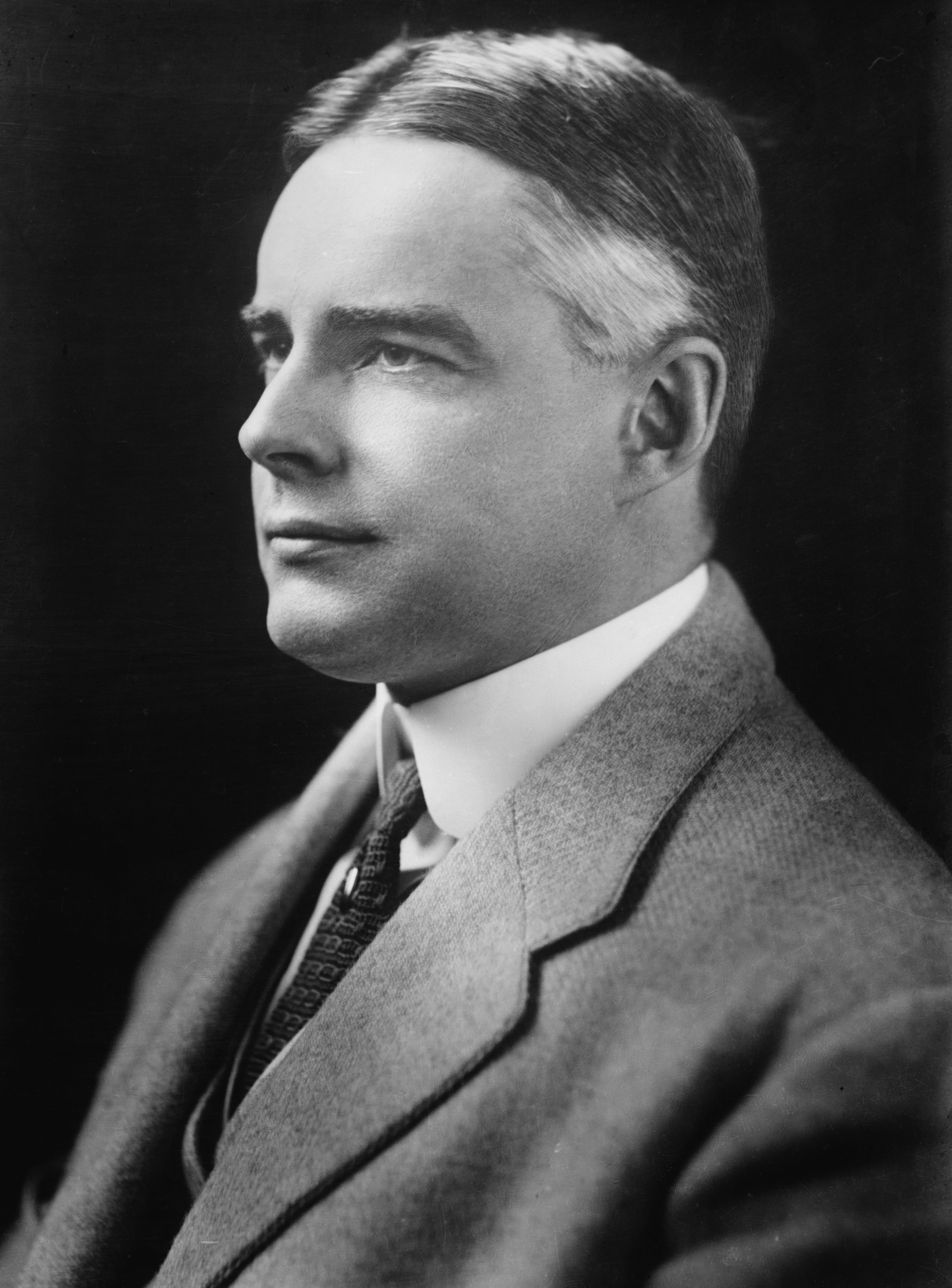

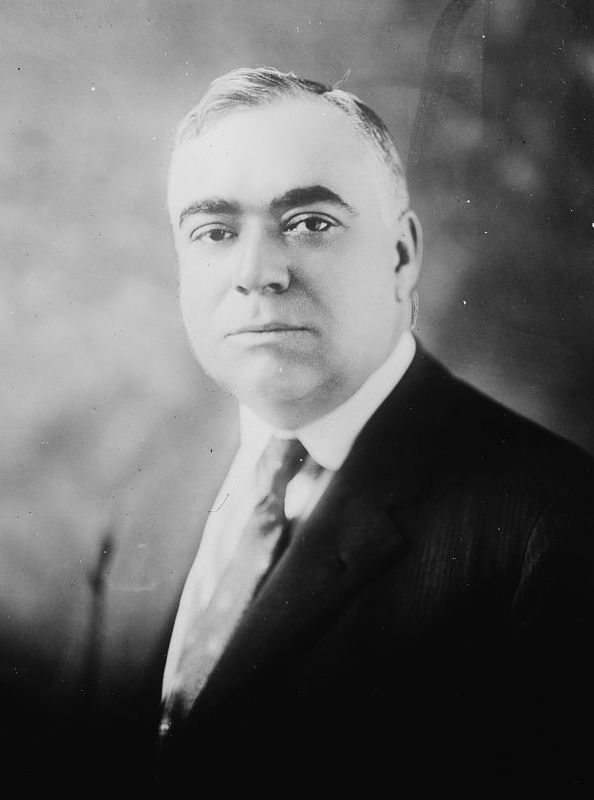
Nominee	Albert Ritchie	Harry Nice
Party	Democratic	Republican
Popular vote	112,240	112,075
Percentage	49.06%	48.99%
- County results Ritchie: 40–50% 50–60% Nice: 40–50% 50–60% 60–70%
Governor before election
Emerson Harrington
Democratic
Elected Governor
Albert Ritchie
Democratic

The 1919 Maryland gubernatorial election was held on November 4, 1919. Democratic nominee Albert Ritchie defeated Republican nominee Harry Nice, receiving 49.06% of the vote.

With a margin of 0.07%, this remains the closest gubernatorial election in Maryland history.

== General election ==
=== Candidates ===
Major party candidates

- Albert Ritchie, Democratic
- Harry Nice, Republican

Other candidates

- Arthur L. Blessing, Socialist
- Robert W. Stevens, Independent

=== Results ===
1919 Maryland gubernatorial election
Party	Candidate	Votes	%	±%
Democratic	Albert Ritchie	112,240	49.06%	
Republican	Harry Nice	112,075	48.99%	
Socialist	Arthur L. Blessing	2,799	1.22%	
Independent	Robert W. Stevens	1,663	0.73%	
Majority		165		
Turnout				
Democratic hold		Swing		
