= Elisabeth Gilman =

American socialist and civil liberties advocate

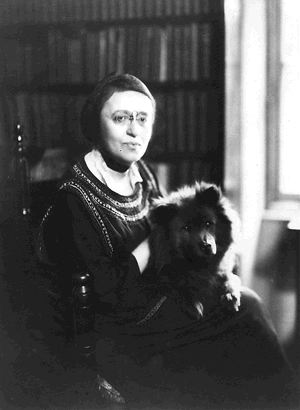
Elisabeth Gilman, Baltimore, circa 1910

Elisabeth Coit Gilman (December 25, 1867 – December 14, 1950) was an American socialist and civil liberties advocate.

== Early life ==
Elisabeth Coit Gilman was born in New Haven, Connecticut, on December 25, 1867, to Daniel Coit Gilman and Mary Ketcham Gilman. Elisabeth was the second child, and had an older sister named Alice. Their mother, Mary, died in 1869 and, as a result, were cared for by Daniel's sister Louise. At the age of seven, Elisabeth's father took the post as the first president of Johns Hopkins University and the family moved to Baltimore, Maryland. She was cared for by a governess until her father remarried. In 1877, Daniel married Elisabeth Dwight Woolsey (1838–1910) of the New England Dwight family, with whom Elisabeth Gilman developed a close relationship.

Gilman attended Miss Hall's School until age eleven, when due to eye trouble, she was tutored by her governess at home. When her eyesight improved, Elisabeth attended the Springside School in Philadelphia at age seventeen. It was planned that she would attend Bryn Mawr College.

== Political life ==
Instead of attending Bryn Mawr, Gilman traveled to France as a representative of the National Committee on Surgical Dressings. While in France, she also worked for the YMCA. It was at this time that she was introduced to the concepts of Socialism. When Gilman returned to the United States at the age of twenty, she entered into social work at the request of her father. Eventually, in 1921, she earned her degree from Johns Hopkins University.

Gilman officially joined the Socialist Party of America on March 1, 1929. She ran for Governor of Maryland in 1930 when she was 62. After running for Governor, she traveled to Russia in 1931 to study the Soviet system. She returned and ran for the United States Senate in 1934 and 1938, Mayor of Baltimore in 1935, and Sheriff of Baltimore in 1942.

== Platform ==
Gilman campaigned for many causes; however, she was mainly involved in workers' rights, civil liberties, and racial equality. In 1921, Elisabeth helped to form The Maryland Civil Liberties Committee; this committee was a precursor to the Maryland Chapter of the American Civil Liberties Union. In 1931, the ACLU would officially establish an affiliate in the state of Maryland; the meeting was held in Gilman's home. Gilman also hosted the first public interracial dinner in Baltimore at her home in 1928 when local hotels refused to allow the dinner on their properties. Gilman was also a core member of the National Mooney-Billings Committee, which was "organized to help secure the pardon of Thomas J. Mooney and Warren K. Billings, serving life sentences in California prisons".

== Death ==
Elisabeth Gilman died on December 14, 1950, at the age of 82. She is buried at Druid Ridge Cemetery in Pikesville, Maryland.
