= William Frederick Broening =

American politician (1870–1953)

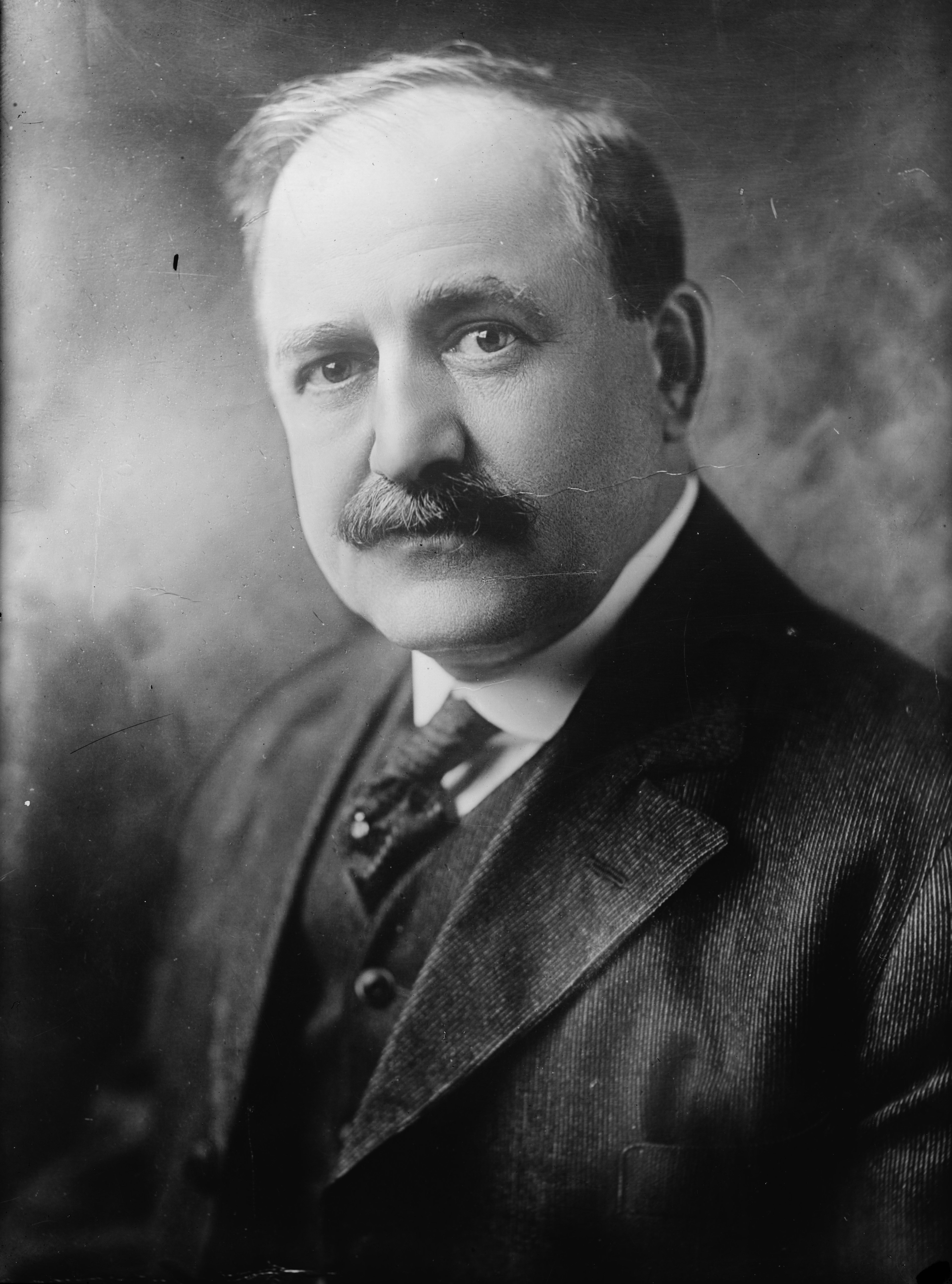

William Frederick Broening (1870–1953) was a Maryland politician and twice Mayor of Baltimore (1919–1923, 1927–1931).

== Background ==
William Frederick Broening was born in Baltimore, Maryland on June 2, 1870, the son of Henry Jacob Broening and Catherine (Petri) Broening. He graduated from the University of Maryland School of Law in 1897.

== Political career ==
Broening served as a member of the Baltimore City Council 1897–99 where he introduced legislation to establish the Electric Commission. He served in the Maryland House of Delegates 1902–04 where he served on the Judiciary Committee. He was elected Baltimore State's Attorney in 1911 and reelected to the position in 1915. He was selected as the Republican candidate for the Mayoralty contest in 1919 and defeated George Weems Williams, Democrat, on 3 March 1919. Broening left the Mayor's office in 1923, but returned to serve a second term from 1927 to 1931.

== Fraternal societies ==
Broening was a member of the Loyal Order of Moose, the Knights of Pythias, the Independent Order of Odd Fellows and the Benevolent and Protective Order of Elks.

== Death and interment ==
Broening died on October 12, 1953. He was buried at Woodlawn Cemetery.

Party political offices
Preceded by Addison E. Mullikin	Republican nominee for Governor of Maryland; 1930	Succeeded by Harry Nice
