= George P. Mahoney =

American politician (1901–1989)

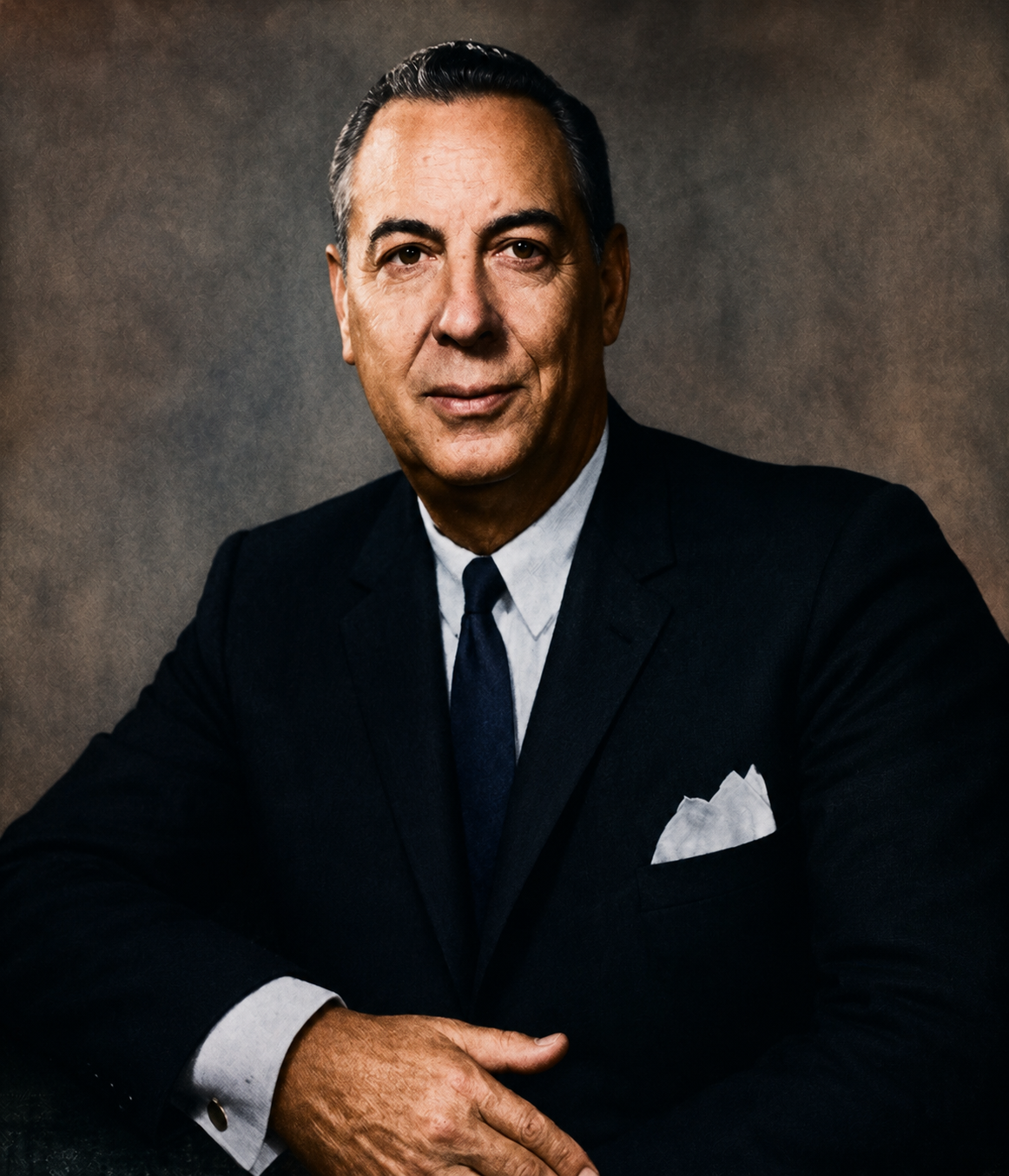
- Colorized photo of Mahoney from 1966

Personal details
- Born: George Perry Mahoney; December 16, 1901 Baltimore, Maryland, U.S.
- Died: March 18, 1989 (aged 87) Baltimore, Maryland, U.S.
- Spouse(s): Abigail Catherine O'Donnell Mahoney (1927–1963, her death); Ann Matilda Fagg (–1981), Dr. Linda Frank (1981–)

George Perry Mahoney (December 16, 1901 – March 18, 1989) was an Irish American Catholic building contractor and Democratic Party politician from the State of Maryland. A perennial candidate, Mahoney is perhaps most famous as the Democratic nominee for Governor of Maryland in 1966. In his campaign he used the slogan "Your home is your castle; protect it".

== Early life and career ==
Mahoney was born in Baltimore, the son of William D. Mahoney and Matilda "Cook" Mahoney. He married Abigail Catherine O'Donnell (died in 1963) on November 24, 1927, and later Ann Matilda Fagg. He married his third wife, plastic surgeon Linda Frank, in 1981. He worked as an engineer, construction executive, and real estate developer.

Under Maryland Governor Herbert O'Conor (a fellow Irish American from Baltimore's 10th ward), Mahoney was appointed a member of the State Racing Commission, where he made a name for himself accusing the industry of fixing horse races by injecting horses with stimulants and narcotics. He was later named chairman by Governor O'Conor. In 1950, he served as a member of the Democratic National Committee from Maryland. Mahoney was also a delegate from Maryland for Democratic National Conventions in 1952, 1956, 1960 and 1964. Mahoney was a member of the Ancient Order of Hibernians, Benevolent and Protective Order of Elks and Friendly Sons of St. Patrick.

== Political campaigns ==
Mahoney's first campaign for office was in 1950, when he ran for governor. He challenged incumbent Democratic governor William Preston Lane, Jr. in the primary. Mahoney lost, but the bitter and divisive primary contest left the Lane campaign weakened for the general election against Republican Theodore McKeldin. Lane lost by 57% to 42%, which at that point was the largest margin of defeat in Maryland history.

In 1952, Democratic U.S. Senator Herbert O'Conor retired and Mahoney won the Democratic primary to succeed him. He was defeated in the general election by Republican James Glenn Beall, 52.5% to 47.5%.

Mahoney ran for governor again in 1954, narrowly losing the Democratic primary to University of Maryland President Curley Byrd by 50.64% to 49.37%. Byrd went on to lose to incumbent governor McKeldin by 54.46% to 45.54%.

Mahoney ran for the U.S. Senate again in 1956. He was defeated in the Democratic primary by former senator Millard Tydings, who had been defeated in 1950 by Republican John Marshall Butler, partly because Butler's campaign had doctored a photo to show Tydings with Communist leader Earl Browder. However, Tydings had to withdraw from the race on August 19 because of poor health. The state Democratic Committee chose to replace him on the ballot a week later with Mahoney, who triumphed over Tydings' wife Eleanor Tydings by 97 votes to 55. Butler went on to defeat Mahoney 53% to 47%.

Mahoney ran against Beall again in 1958 but lost a divisive Democratic primary campaign to Baltimore Mayor Thomas D'Alesandro, Jr., who went on to lose to Beall 51% to 49%.

Mahoney ran for governor again in 1962, challenging incumbent governor J. Millard Tawes in the Democratic primary. Tawes not only beat Mahoney but went on to win the general election against Republican Frank Small, Jr. Tawes became thus the first and only Democrat to win a primary against Mahoney and then go on to win the general election.

Mahoney won the Democratic nomination for governor in 1966 with just 30.21% of the vote. U.S. Representative Carlton R. Sickles (29.84%) and Attorney General of Maryland Thomas B. Finan (27.31%) split the vote and allowed Mahoney, who ran on an anti-open housing campaign, to triumph. In the general election, Mahoney's slogan "Your home is your castle; protect it" prompted Baltimore City Comptroller Hyman A. Pressman to enter the race as an Independent candidate. Mahoney's controversial stances caused many liberals in the Maryland Democratic Party to split their support between Spiro Agnew, owing to his pro-civil rights, socially moderate views, and Pressman. This split helped Agnew to win the election with a plurality, taking 70% of the black vote. In 1969, Agnew became Vice President of the United States under Richard Nixon.

Mahoney ran for the Senate again in 1968, this time not as a Democrat, but with the support of the American Independent Party. Democrat Daniel Brewster, who had been elected in 1962 to succeed the retiring Butler, was defeated by his former college roommate, liberal Republican Charles Mathias. Brewster, who supported the war policies of the Johnson administration, lost by 47.8% to 39.1%, with Mahoney taking 13.1%.

Mahoney returned to the Democratic Party to run for the Senate again in 1970. He ran in the primary against Senator Joseph Tydings, who had defeated Beall in 1964. Tydings faced criticism from the right and the left: from the right for his sponsorship of the Firearms Registration and Licensing Act, which would have required the registration of firearms; and from the left for his support of a crime bill for the District of Columbia, which was perceived as repressive against African Americans. After a divisive campaign, Tydings beat Mahoney by 53% to 37%. Tydings went on to lose the general election to Beall's son, freshman Congressman J. Glenn Beall Jr., by 50.7% to 48.1%. Mahoney died in 1989.

Party political offices
Preceded by Herbert O'Conor	Democratic nominee for United States Senator from Maryland (Class 1); 1952	Succeeded by Thomas D'Alesandro Jr.
Preceded by Millard Tydings	Democratic nominee for United States Senator from Maryland (Class 3); 1956	Succeeded by Daniel Brewster
Preceded by J. Millard Tawes	Democratic nominee for Governor of Maryland; 1966	Succeeded by Marvin Mandel
