= Hyman A. Pressman =

Politician in Maryland, USA (1914–1996)

- Pressman in 1963

14th Comptroller of Baltimore
- In office May 21, 1963 – December 3, 1991
- Preceded by: Richard Walter Graham III
- Succeeded by: Jacqueline McLean

Personal details
- Born: April 23, 1914 Baltimore, Maryland, U.S.
- Died: March 15, 1996 (aged 81) Baltimore, Maryland, U.S.
- Party: Democratic (before 1963, 1964–1965, 1967–1991)
- Other political affiliations: Independent (1966); Republican (1963)
- Spouse: Annabelle Komitzsky (m. 1937)
- Education: University of Baltimore (LLB)
- Profession: Politician

Military service
- Branch/service: United States Army
- Years of service: 1944–1945
- Rank: Technical Sergeant

Hyman Aaron Pressman (April 23, 1914 – March 15, 1996), also known as Hyman A., was an American politician and lawyer who served as the 14th Comptroller of Baltimore, Maryland, from 1963 to 1991.

Born in Baltimore, Pressman began a law career before entering politics. He was the younger brother of Albert I. Pressman, a General Motors auto worker. Despite being a registered Democratic, Pressman ran in the 1966 Maryland gubernatorial election as an independent after the Democratic Party nominated segregationist George P. Mahoney as its candidate.

Serving as City Comptroller in the administrations between Theodore McKeldin to Kurt Schmoke, Pressman continued his efforts for stability financially during this public service but failing health and declining faculties made him unable to handle the job, and he retired in 1991 after 53 years of political work. Pressman died at the Levindale Hebrew Geriatric Center and Hospital in Levindale, Baltimore, MD, in 1996 at age 81.

== Early life and education ==
Hyman Aaron Pressman was born on April 23, 1914, in East Baltimore, to Sol and Esther Pressman, who were Jewish immigrants. Grew up on Lombard Street, near Central Avenue, Pressman had an older sibling, Albert I. Pressman (1910–1999). His father, Sol, an Orthodox-Russian, was a pant-repair tailor however he died of pneumonia when Hyman was 14 years old. In the late 1920s, Pressman attended Baltimore City College and, in 1931, at the age of 17, Pressman enrolled at the University of Baltimore, for night law classes, graduating two years later with a law degree. At the age of 19, Hyman passed his state bar examination, later admitting to the bar association at 21 years old where he started a one-person law firm. During the Second World War, Pressman enlisted into the United States Army in 1944 and was later shipped into the Philippines a year later, offering as a lawyer for servicemen up for court-martial. In Pressman's first court appearance, his client was acquitted. He continued to defend during his service time, claiming to have never lost a case. Upon returning home from the Philippines, Pressman continued working at his law firm, winning 29 cases in 39 attempts, between 1946 and 1960.

In 1954, he worked as an attorney for George Perry Mahoney, who was locked in a tight primary race against Curley Byrd for the Democratic nomination in Maryland's upcoming November gubernatorial election. On June 29, Byrd was declared the apparent winner, but despite polls favoring him by a small margin, Mahoney refused to concede defeat. The election results were taken to court, where Pressman argued that all ballots from the Baltimore City First District should be invalidated on the grounds that a substitute judge at a polling place had not been properly sworn in. He also requested that Circuit Judge William R. Horney impound all unused ballots from the same district. Pressman contended that proper procedures had been violated when 410 ballots were sent to district officials, whereas the law required a shipment of only 381—the number of registered voters—plus an additional 10 percent allotment. After two months of legal battles, Mahoney conceded on August 27, and Pressman ultimately lost the case.

On May 8, 1960, Pressman filed for a seat for the Baltimore City Supreme Bench, as both a Democrat and Republican. He cross-fired in both primaries against the two incumbent judges on the Supreme Bench, who are up for a full 15 year elective term—Judges Dulany Fosters and John Gilbert Prendergast. After an eight-day campaign, Pressman was defeated in the election, finishing third.

== Political career ==
=== Early political career ===
In 1928, Pressman was only 14 years old when he joined the political landscape, giving a speech on the behalf of New York governor, Al Smith, then campaigning for the presidential election. He used a soapbox on Pennsylvania Avenue and delivered himself of a panegyric that astounded an adult crowd which had paused to listen. The next day, a local newspaper got word of the speech and dispatched a photographer and reporter to interview Pressman. It was three years later when, at 17 years old, Pressman signed on as a campaign worker for Howard W. Jackson, who was running for mayor of Baltimore. After Jackson won the 1931 mayoral election, Pressman was given a job in the city highway department at 18 dollars a week. Five years later, he made his first bid for organizational support, founding the Baltimore Young Democrats, Inc, and installing himself as their president. In 1938, Pressman announced his campaign for Maryland House of Delegates, in the fourth legislative district ran by incumbent Jack Pollack. After a close race, Pressman defeated by 900 votes.

Between 1939 and 1949, Pressman took a hiatus from politics, working as a lawyer during the Second World War and privately after. By 1950, Pressman has already returned to politics and announced their campaign for Baltimore City Comptroller. He ran as an independent, on the Democratic ticket, losing in the March primaries to John N. McCardell, who went on to be elected as city comptroller. In December 1954, Pressman announced their candidacy for Baltimore City Mayor, rivaling Democratic incumbent Thomas D'Alesandro Jr., however he withdrew his candidacy in January 1955, later endorsing Samuel Hopkins, a Republican, for mayor in May, later losing to D'Alesandro Jr., in the mayoral election.

=== City Comptroller ===
Pressman lost his first bid for election in the 1963 Baltimore Democratic Primary election for City Comptroller to Henry R. Hergenroeder, Sr. by just over 1,200 votes (less than 1%). Following the election, the Republican Party candidate withdrew, and Pressman accepted the Republican nomination as their candidate for City Comptroller. He won the general election running on a ticket with former Baltimore Mayor, and Maryland Governor Republican, Theodore Roosevelt McKeldin, elected back as mayor the same year. Pressman returned to the Democratic Party following his victory and won six additional terms as Baltimore City Comptroller.

== Defending the city against Randy Newman ==
In 1977, Pressman took offense at Randy Newman's song named after the city, Baltimore. He wrote a poem in response, which included the lyrics:

There is no need for us to fret/For we know Randy is all wet/He doesn’t seem to know the score/When he downgrades our Baltimore ... We have a city that is bloomin’/But Randy Newman isn’t human.

== Involvement in the departure of the Colts ==
During the 1970s, when the Baltimore Colts owner Robert Irsay and Baltimore Orioles owner Jerold Hoffberger were seeking major upgrades to the outdated Memorial Stadium or the building of a new stadium, Pressman opposed using public money to build a replacement. During the 1974 elections, Pressman had an amendment to the city's charter placed on the fall ballot. Known as Question P, the amendment called for declaring "the 33rd Street stadium as a memorial to war veterans and prohibiting the use of city funds for construction of any other stadium." The measure passed 56 to 44 percent, effectively destroying any chance of a new, modern sports complex being built in Baltimore.

In 1984, the city's NFL franchise left for Indianapolis. In the next elections, city voters repealed Question P by 62 percent to 38 percent, paving the way for the construction of both Oriole Park at Camden Yards and Ravens Stadium (later renamed M&T Bank Stadium). Pressman remained as an elected City Comptroller for 28 years (seven terms in a row) until retiring in 1991.

== Personal life ==
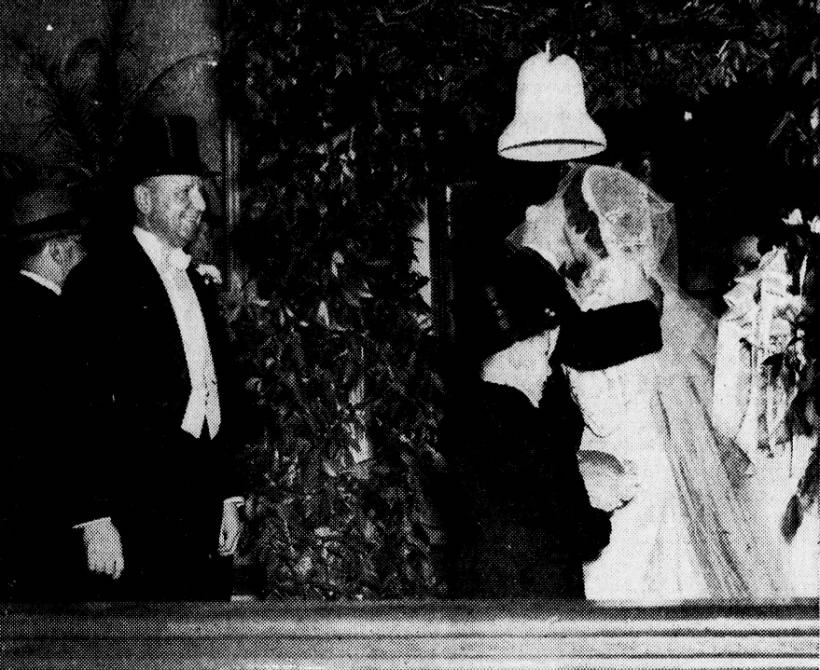
Hyman Aaron Pressman's wedding photo with his wife, Annabelle Komitzsky, in 1937.

At a club function in 1937, Pressman met Annabelle Komitzsky (1916–2002), a member of the Ladies Auxiliary. They were married on February 7, 1937, with United States Senate member from Maryland George L. P. Radcliffe being present as Pressman's guest of honor. He had two children: Sheila Sylvia Stark Pressman (Born c. 1944–45) and Lester Saul Pressman (Born c. 1949–1950), who both attended religious schools and felt strongly about Jewish laws. When Pressman's mother passed away, in 1961, they asked that he observe all Orthodox Hebrew customs, and he gave up observing the sabbath when he went into the service.

=== Health issues and death ===
Pressman suffered a stroke in 1989. His health and acumen deteriorated, dying from Alzheimer's Disease on March 15, 1996, in the Levindale Hebrew Geriatric Center and Hospital at the age of 81. Pressman was survived by his wife, daughter, son, brother and seven grandchildren. He was interred, at Shaarei Zion Congregation Cemetery, in Rosedale, Maryland.
