= 1976 United States Senate election in Maryland =

- November 2, 1976
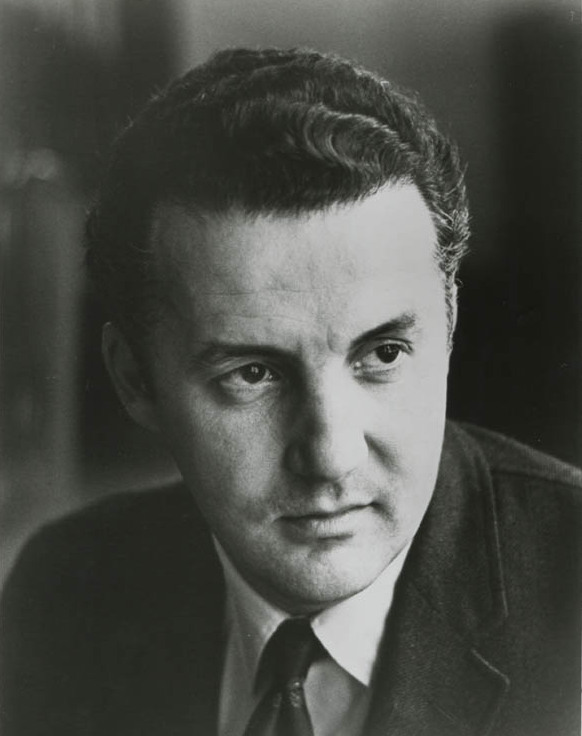

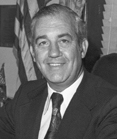
| Nominee | Paul Sarbanes | J. Glenn Beall Jr. |
| Party | Democratic | Republican |
| Popular vote | 772,101 | 530,439 |
| Percentage | 56.55% | 38.85% |
- County results Sarbanes: 40–50% 50–60% 70–80% Beall: 40–50% 50–60% 60–70%
U.S. senator before election
John Glenn Beall Jr.
Republican
Elected U.S. Senator
Paul Sarbanes
Democratic

The 1976 United States Senate election in Maryland took place on November 2, 1976. Incumbent Republican U.S. Senator Glenn Beall Jr. ran for re-election to a second term, but was defeated by Democratic challenger Paul Sarbanes. This is the last time a Senator from Maryland lost re-election.

== Major candidates ==
=== Democratic ===
- Paul Sarbanes, U.S. Representative since 1971
- Joseph Tydings, former Senator

=== Republican ===
- John Glenn Beall Jr., incumbent U.S. Senator since 1971

== Results ==
General election results
| Party | Candidate | Votes | % |
|---|---|---|---|
| Democratic | Paul Sarbanes | 772,101 | 56.55% |
| Republican | John Glenn Beall Jr. (incumbent) | 530,439 | 38.85% |
| Independent | Bruce Bradley | 62,750 | 4.60% |
| Majority | | 241,662 | 17.70% |
| Turnout | | 1,365,290 | |
| Democratic gain from Republican | | | |

=== Results by county ===
By county

| County | Sarbanes | | Beall Jr. | | Bruce Bradley | | Margin | | Total Votes |
| County | # | % | # | % | # | % | # | % | Total Votes |
|---|---|---|---|---|---|---|---|---|---|
| Allegany | 13802 | 46.17% | 14680 | 49.10% | 1415 | 4.73% | -878 | -2.94% | 29897 |
| Anne Arundel | 54435 | 49.72% | 49655 | 45.35% | 5403 | 4.93% | 4780 | 4.37% | 109493 |
| Baltimore (City) | 191916 | 77.08% | 51375 | 20.63% | 5696 | 2.29% | 140541 | 56.45% | 248987 |
| Baltimore (County) | 140163 | 55.49% | 102011 | 40.39% | 10405 | 4.12% | 38152 | 15.10% | 252579 |
| Calvert | 3785 | 53.18% | 2943 | 41.35% | 390 | 5.48% | 842 | 11.83% | 7118 |
| Caroline | 2488 | 44.86% | 2835 | 51.12% | 223 | 4.02% | -347 | -6.26% | 5546 |
| Carroll | 9233 | 37.83% | 13884 | 56.89% | 1289 | 5.28% | -4651 | -19.06% | 24406 |
| Cecil | 8016 | 52.18% | 6815 | 44.36% | 531 | 3.46% | 1201 | 7.82% | 15362 |
| Charles | 8100 | 51.30% | 7067 | 44.76% | 623 | 3.95% | 1033 | 6.54% | 15790 |
| Dorchester | 3968 | 48.66% | 3811 | 46.73% | 376 | 4.61% | 157 | 1.93% | 8155 |
| Frederick | 11551 | 37.20% | 17510 | 56.39% | 1989 | 6.41% | -5959 | -19.19% | 31050 |
| Garrett | 2,212 | 31.00% | 4,674 | 65.51% | 249 | 3.49% | -2,462 | -34.51% | 7135 |
| Harford | 21359 | 50.98% | 18277 | 43.62% | 2262 | 5.40% | 3082 | 7.36% | 41898 |
| Howard | 21168 | 52.63% | 16346 | 40.64% | 2704 | 6.72% | 4822 | 11.99% | 40218 |
| Kent | 2742 | 49.74% | 2575 | 46.71% | 196 | 3.56% | 167 | 3.03% | 5513 |
| Montgomery | 130981 | 53.11% | 98974 | 40.13% | 16689 | 6.77% | 32007 | 12.98% | 246644 |
| Prince George's | 105736 | 58.14% | 67331 | 37.02% | 8798 | 4.84% | 38405 | 21.12% | 181865 |
| Queen Anne's | 3115 | 48.62% | 3029 | 47.28% | 263 | 4.10% | 86 | 1.34% | 6407 |
| St. Mary's | 6429 | 55.20% | 4652 | 39.95% | 565 | 4.85% | 1777 | 15.26% | 11646 |
| Somerset | 2950 | 49.85% | 2832 | 47.85% | 136 | 2.30% | 118 | 1.99% | 5918 |
| Talbot | 3420 | 38.74% | 4884 | 55.33% | 523 | 5.93% | -1464 | -16.59% | 8827 |
| Washington | 11347 | 33.32% | 21497 | 63.12% | 1212 | 3.56% | -10150 | -29.80% | 34056 |
| Wicomico | 9767 | 51.35% | 8709 | 45.79% | 543 | 2.86% | 1058 | 5.56% | 19019 |
| Worcester | 3418 | 44.04% | 4073 | 52.48% | 270 | 3.48% | -655 | -8.44% | 7761 |
| Total | 772,101 | 56.55% | 530,439 | 38.85% | 62,750 | 4.60% | 241,662 | 17.70% | 1,365,290 |

==== Counties that flipped from Republican to Democratic ====
- Anne Arundel
- Baltimore (County)
- Calvert
- Cecil
- Charles
- Dorchester
- Harford
- Howard
- Kent
- Queen Anne's
- Somerset
- St. Mary's
- Wicomico

== See also ==
- 1976 United States Senate elections
- 1976 United States elections
