= 1958 United States Senate election in Maryland =

- November 4, 1958
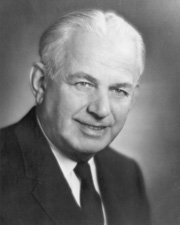

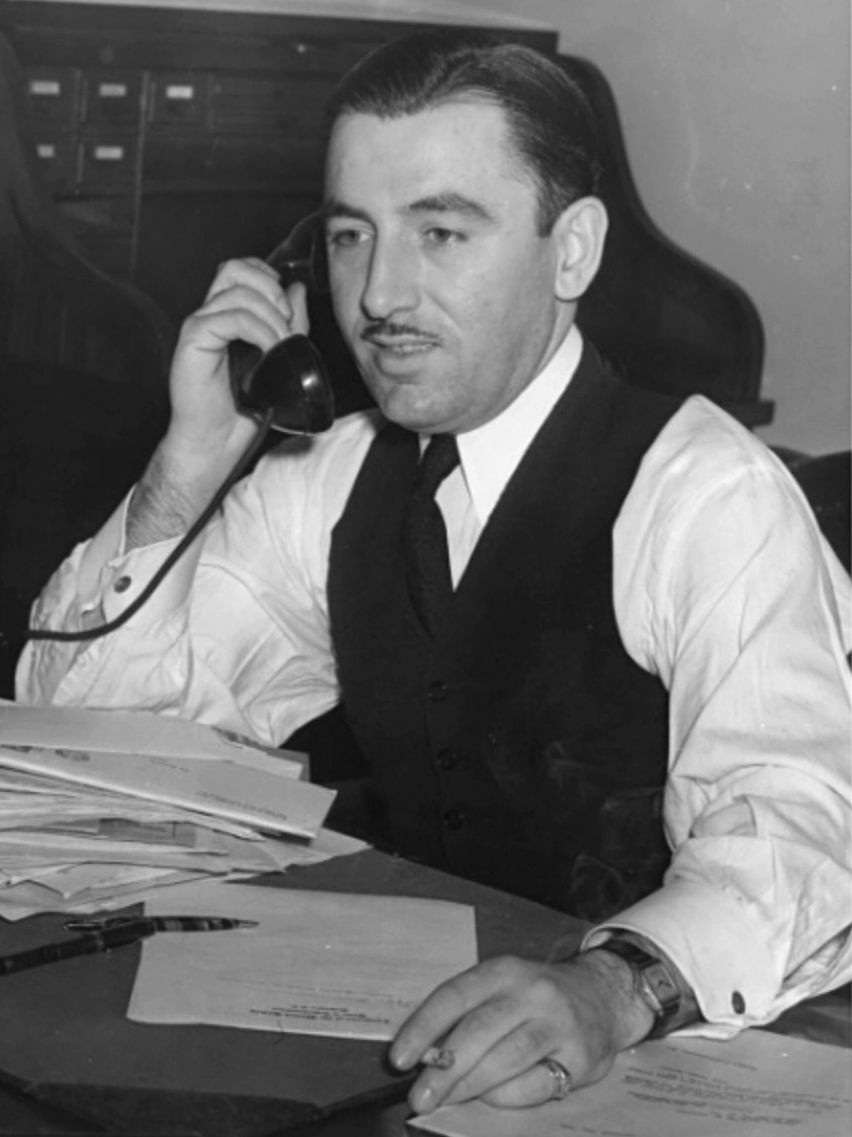
Nominee	James Glenn Beall	Thomas D'Alesandro
Party	Republican	Democratic
Popular vote	544,354	452,938
Percentage	54.58%	45.42%
- County results Beall: 50–60% 60–70% D'Alesandro: 50–60%
U.S. senator before election
James Glenn Beall
Republican
Elected U.S. Senator
James Glenn Beall
Republican

The 1958 United States Senate election in Maryland was held on November 4, 1958.

Senator James Glenn Beall narrowly defeated Baltimore Mayor Thomas D'Alesandro for re-election to a second term. Beall's victory came despite a national landslide for Senate Democrats.

== Republican primary ==
=== Candidates ===
- James Glenn Beall, incumbent senator
- Henry J. Lague, candidate for Senate in 1956

=== Results ===
1958 Republican U.S. Senate primary
Party	Candidate	Votes	%
Republican	James Glenn Beall (incumbent)	50,754	91.00%
Republican	Henry J. Lague	5,017	9.00%
Total votes		55,771	100.00%

== Democratic primary ==
=== Candidates ===
- James Cabell Bruce, former United States Ambassador to Argentina
- Thomas D'Alesandro Jr., Mayor of Baltimore
- Andrew J. Easter
- William F. Fadler Jr.
- Clarence Long, Johns Hopkins University professor and Eisenhower adviser
- George P. Mahoney, paving contractor and nominee for Senate in 1952
- Alden A. Potter

=== Results ===
1958 Democratic U.S. Senate primary
Party	Candidate	Votes	%
Democratic	Thomas D'Alesandro	125,408	34.71%
Democratic	George P. Mahoney	119,796	33.15%
Democratic	James Cabell Bruce	53,365	14.77%
Democratic	Clarence D. Long	47,290	13.09%
Democratic	Alden A. Potter	6,194	1.71%
Democratic	William F. Fadler Jr.	4,822	1.33%
Democratic	Andrew J. Easter	4,476	1.24%
Total votes		361,351	100.00%

== General election ==
=== Results ===
General election results
Party	Candidate	Votes	%	±%
Republican	James Glenn Beall (incumbent)	544,354	54.58%	▼1.36
Democratic	Thomas D'Alesandro, Jr.	452,938	45.42%	▲1.36
Total votes		997,292	100.00%	
Republican hold				

=== Results by county ===
County	J. Glenn Beall Republican		Thomas D'Alesandro Democratic		Margin		Total Votes Cast
County	#	%	#	%	#	%	Total Votes Cast
Allegany	15144	62.60%	9047	37.40%	6097	25.20%	24191
Anne Arundel	21425	57.31%	15962	42.69%	5463	14.61%	37387
Baltimore (City)	272177	54.58%	226469	45.42%	45708	9.17%	498646
Baltimore (County)	72514	57.35%	53936	42.65%	18578	14.69%	126450
Calvert	2053	48.49%	2181	51.51%	-128	-3.02%	4234
Caroline	2821	53.42%	2460	46.58%	361	6.84%	5281
Carroll	8259	65.70%	4312	34.30%	3947	31.40%	12571
Cecil	4791	50.22%	4749	49.78%	42	0.44%	9540
Charles	4180	51.32%	3965	48.68%	215	2.64%	8145
Dorchester	3556	44.47%	4440	55.53%	-884	-11.06%	7996
Frederick	11233	64.61%	6153	35.39%	5080	29.22%	17386
Garrett	3731	66.53%	1877	33.47%	1854	33.06%	5608
Harford	8115	57.54%	5988	42.46%	2127	15.08%	14103
Howard	5402	60.03%	3597	39.97%	1805	20.06%	8999
Kent	2830	53.76%	2434	46.24%	396	7.52%	5264
Montgomery	43840	53.62%	37913	46.38%	5927	7.25%	81753
Prince George's	26688	42.35%	36324	57.65%	-9636	-15.29%	63012
Queen Anne's	2109	45.12%	2565	54.88%	-456	-9.76%	4674
St. Mary's	2722	41.49%	3838	58.51%	-1116	-17.01%	6560
Somerset	3228	47.28%	3600	52.72%	-372	-5.45%	6828
Talbot	4061	61.02%	2594	38.98%	1467	22.04%	6655
Washington	15288	58.79%	10718	41.21%	4570	17.57%	26006
Wicomico	5682	52.46%	5149	47.54%	533	4.92%	10831
Worcester	2505	48.43%	2667	51.57%	-162	-3.13%	5172
Total	544354	54.58%	452938	45.42%	91416	9.17%	997292

==== Counties that flipped from Democratic to Republican ====
- Baltimore (City)
- Cecil

==== Counties that flipped from Republican to Democratic ====
- Calvert
- Dorchester
- Prince George's
- Worcester

== See also ==
- 1958 United States Senate elections
- 1958 United States elections
