= George Beall (attorney) =

American attorney

United States Attorney for the District of Maryland
- In office June 1, 1970 – March 31, 1975
- President: Richard M. Nixon; Gerald R. Ford
- Preceded by: Stephen H. Sachs
- Succeeded by: Jervis S. Finney

Personal details
- Born: George Beall VIII; August 17, 1937 Frostburg, Maryland
- Died: January 15, 2017 (aged 79) Naples, Florida
- Spouses: Linda Jenkins (m. 1961, divorced) Nancy Roche (m. 1965, divorced) Carolyn Campbell (m. 1980)
- Children: 1
- Parent: J. Glenn Beall (father)
- Relatives: J. Glenn Beall Jr. (brother)
- Education: Princeton University (BA); University of Virginia (LLB)
- Occupation: Attorney, prosecutor
- Known for: Criminal prosecution of Spiro T. Agnew

George Beall VIII (August 17, 1937 – January 15, 2017) was a prominent U.S. attorney. While serving as United States Attorney for the District of Maryland, he prosecuted Vice President of the United States Spiro Agnew for bribery. This prosecution ultimately led to Agnew's resignation as Vice President in 1973.

== Background ==
Beall was born in Frostburg, Maryland, on August 17, 1937, a son of James Glenn Beall and Margaret (Schwarzenbach) Beall. His siblings included John Glenn Beall Jr.

Beall received his undergraduate degree from Princeton University in 1959; and his law degree from the University of Virginia School of Law, in 1963. His first two marriages, to Linda Jenkins in 1961 and Nancy Roche in 1965, ended in divorces. In 1980, he married Carolyn Campbell. He died in Naples, Florida, on January 15, 2017.

== Career ==
After clerking for Chief Judge Simon E. Sobeloff of the United States Court of Appeals for the Fourth Circuit, Beall became a trial lawyer for a Maryland law firm. In 1968, Spiro Agnew, the Governor of Maryland at the time, appointed Beall, a fellow Republican, to the Maryland Criminal Injuries Compensation Board.

Beall was appointed United States attorney in June 1970, initially on an interim basis. Though he had never prosecuted a single case, Beall proved to be, in the words of his predecessor, a "tough act to follow" as United States Attorney for the District of Maryland: among other cases and investigations, he indicted and prosecuted Arthur Bremer for the shooting of presidential candidate, and Governor of Alabama, George Wallace; as well as a state legislator turned drug dealer; and Spiro Agnew, by then the Vice President of the United States.

=== Agnew investigation ===
Two years after Beall took office, he opened an investigation into corruption in Baltimore County of public officials and architects, engineers, and paving contractors. One contractor, Lester Matz, stated that he had been paying "Agnew kickbacks in exchange for contracts for years — first when Agnew was the Baltimore County Executive, then when he was Governor of Maryland and Vice President." Another witness, Jerome B. Wolff, head of Maryland's roads commission, stated that his attic was filled with documentation that detailed "every corrupt payment he participated in with then-Governor Agnew."

Despite being pressured by the White House and his brother (now a senator), Beall continued to allow his investigators to continue their work. Agnew resigned as Vice President and pleaded no contest to tax evasion in the sum of $13,551.47 for 1967. He was fined $10,000 and avoided prison time.

=== Private practice ===
Beall resigned on March 31, 1975, and returned to private practice, specializing in commercial litigation. His clients included the Baltimore Ravens while owned by Art Modell.

In 1978, he worked as campaign chairman for his brother's failed run for Governor of Maryland.
