= 1964 United States Senate election in Maryland =

- November 3, 1964
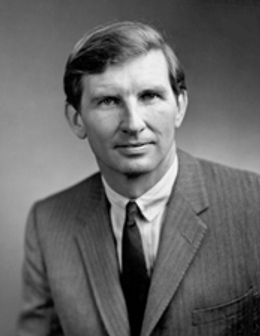

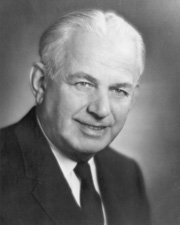
Nominee	Joseph Tydings	James Glenn Beall
Party	Democratic	Republican
Popular vote	678,649	402,393
Percentage	62.78%	37.22%
- County results Tydings: 50–60% 60–70% 70–80% Beall: 50–60% 60–70%
U.S. senator before election
James Glenn Beall
Republican
Elected U.S. Senator
Joseph D. Tydings
Democratic

The 1964 United States Senate election in Maryland was held on November 3, 1964.

Incumbent Republican Senator James Glenn Beall ran for re-election to a third term, but was defeated by Democratic former State Representative Joseph D. Tydings in a landslide.

Tydings was the adopted son of former Senator Millard Tydings.

== Republican primary ==
=== Candidates ===
- William A. Albaugh
- James Glenn Beall, incumbent senator
- James P. Gleason, candidate for Senate in 1962 and former assistant to Senators Richard Nixon and William F. Knowland
- Henry J. Lague Jr., perennial candidate

=== Results ===
1964 Republican U.S. Senate primary
Party	Candidate	Votes	%
Republican	James Glenn Beall (incumbent)	68,930	59.79%
Republican	James P. Gleason	35,645	30.92%
Republican	William A. Albaugh	8,352	7.24%
Republican	Henry J. Lague	2,370	2.06%
Total votes		115,297	100.00%

== Democratic primary ==
=== Candidates ===
- Morgan L. Amiamo, perennial candidate
- Louis L. Goldstein, Maryland Comptroller
- John J. Harbaugh
- Joseph D. Tydings, former State Representative and son of former Senator Millard Tydings

=== Results ===
1964 Democratic U.S. Senate primary
Party	Candidate	Votes	%
Democratic	Joseph D. Tydings	279,564	59.08%
Democratic	Louis L. Goldstein	155,086	32.77%
Democratic	John J. Harbaugh	22,665	4.79%
Democratic	Morgan Amiamo	15,921	3.36%
Total votes		473,236	100.00%

== General election ==
=== Results ===
General election results
Party	Candidate	Votes	%	±%
Democratic	Joseph D. Tydings	678,649	62.78%	▲13.96
Republican	James Glenn Beall (incumbent)	402,393	37.22%	▼13.96
Total votes		1,081,042	100.00%	
Democratic gain from Republican				

=== Results by county ===
County	Joseph D. Tydings Democratic		J. Glenn Beall Republican		Margin		Total Votes Cast
County	#	%	#	%	#	%	Total Votes Cast
Allegany	14402	44.46%	17994	55.54%	-3592	-11.09%	32396
Anne Arundel	35846	57.42%	26585	42.58%	9261	14.83%	62431
Baltimore	116269	60.52%	75849	39.48%	40420	21.04%	192118
Baltimore City	218520	71.92%	85318	28.08%	133202	43.84%	303838
Calvert	2664	56.05%	2089	43.95%	575	12.10%	4753
Caroline	3514	59.10%	2432	40.90%	1082	18.20%	5946
Carroll	8045	49.17%	8318	50.83%	-273	-1.67%	16363
Cecil	7738	61.59%	4825	38.41%	2913	23.19%	12563
Charles	6049	63.43%	3488	36.57%	2561	26.85%	9537
Dorchester	4425	49.50%	4514	50.50%	-89	-1.00%	8939
Frederick	12400	53.53%	10766	46.47%	1634	7.05%	23166
Garrett	2650	38.51%	4232	61.49%	-1582	-22.99%	6882
Harford	15475	66.30%	7867	33.70%	7608	32.59%	23342
Howard	8083	54.78%	6673	45.22%	1410	9.56%	14756
Kent	3443	58.78%	2414	41.22%	1029	17.57%	5857
Montgomery	93878	61.28%	59311	38.72%	34567	22.56%	153189
Prince George's	80726	65.00%	43472	35.00%	37254	30.00%	124198
Queen Anne's	3778	66.93%	1867	33.07%	1911	33.85%	5645
St. Mary's	5234	64.28%	2908	35.72%	2326	28.57%	8142
Somerset	3170	46.71%	3617	53.29%	-447	-6.59%	6787
Talbot	4305	56.17%	3359	43.83%	946	12.34%	7664
Washington	17631	55.29%	14258	44.71%	3373	10.58%	31889
Wicomico	7641	51.56%	7178	48.44%	463	3.12%	14819
Worcester	2763	47.46%	3059	52.54%	-296	-5.08%	5822
Total	678649	62.78%	402393	37.22%	276256	25.55%	1081042

==== Counties that flipped from Republican to Democratic ====
- Anne Arundel
- Baltimore (County)
- Baltimore (City)
- Caroline
- Cecil
- Charles
- Frederick
- Harford
- Howard
- Kent
- Montgomery
- Talbot
- Washington
- Wicomico

==== Counties that flipped from Democratic to Republican ====
- Dorchester
- Somerset
- Worcester

== See also ==
- 1964 United States Senate elections
- 1964 United States elections
