= 1956 United States Senate election in Maryland =

- November 6, 1956
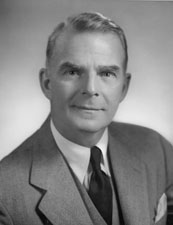

Nominee	John Marshall Butler	George P. Mahoney
Party	Republican	Democratic
Popular vote	473,059	420,108
Percentage	52.96%	47.04%
- County results Butler: 50–60% 60–70% Mahoney: 50–60%
U.S. senator before election
John Marshall Butler
Republican
Elected U.S. Senator
John Marshall Butler
Republican

The 1956 United States Senate election in Maryland was held on November 6, 1956. Incumbent Republican U.S. Senator John Marshall Butler was re-elected to a second term in office, defeating Democratic businessman George P. Mahoney.

As of 2023, this was the last time Maryland voted simultaneously for a Republican presidential candidate and a Republican senate candidate. This was the first time ever that Maryland re-elected a Republican Senator.

== Republican primary ==
=== Candidates ===
- John Marshall Butler, incumbent Senator since 1951
- Earl E. Knepper
- Henry J. Laque Jr.

=== Results ===
1956 Republican U.S. Senate primary
Party	Candidate	Votes	%
Republican	John Marshall Butler (inc.)	40,848	86.66%
Republican	Earl E. Knepper	3,814	8.09%
Republican	Harry L. Simms	2,474	5.25%
Total votes		47,136	100.00%

== Democratic primary ==
=== Candidates ===
- George P. Mahoney, Baltimore businessman and 1952 nominee for Senate
- Millard Tydings, former Senator from 1927 to 1951

=== Results ===
1956 Democratic U.S. Senate primary
Party	Candidate	Votes	%
Democratic	Millard Tydings	142,238	47.50%
Democratic	George P. Mahoney	134,246	44.83%
Democratic	George Washington Williams	13,348	4.46%
Democratic	Thomas L. Christian	7,285	2.43%
Democratic	Andrew J. Easter	2,311	0.77%
Total votes		299,428	100.00%

After winning the primary, Tydings was forced to withdraw from the race due to ill health. Mahoney replaced him on the general election ticket.

== General election ==
=== Results ===
1956 U.S. Senate election in Maryland
Party	Candidate	Votes	%
Republican	John Marshall Butler (inc.)	473,059	52.96%
Democratic	George P. Mahoney	420,108	47.04%
Total votes		893,167	100.00%
Republican hold			

=== Results by county ===
County	John Marshall Butler Republican		George P. Mahoney Democratic		Margin		Total Votes Cast
County	#	%	#	%	#	%	Total Votes Cast
Allegany	17435	58.51%	12365	41.49%	5070	17.01%	29800
Anne Arundel	25459	59.31%	17466	40.69%	7993	18.62%	42925
Baltimore (City)	147761	49.15%	152898	50.85%	-5137	-1.71%	300659
Baltimore (County)	86524	58.22%	62082	41.78%	24442	16.45%	148606
Calvert	2185	49.41%	2237	50.59%	-52	-1.18%	4422
Caroline	3655	55.51%	2929	44.49%	726	11.03%	6584
Carroll	10461	66.44%	5283	33.56%	5178	32.89%	15744
Cecil	6122	53.09%	5410	46.91%	712	6.17%	11532
Charles	4446	50.74%	4317	49.26%	129	1.47%	8763
Dorchester	4967	54.12%	4211	45.88%	756	8.24%	9178
Frederick	12616	59.32%	8653	40.68%	3963	18.63%	21269
Garrett	4648	63.21%	2705	36.79%	1943	26.42%	7353
Harford	10095	55.64%	8049	44.36%	2046	11.28%	18144
Howard	5571	57.09%	4188	42.91%	1383	14.17%	9759
Kent	3220	54.82%	2654	45.18%	566	9.64%	5874
Montgomery	48509	50.90%	46788	49.10%	1721	1.81%	95297
Prince George's	34081	44.44%	42603	55.56%	-8522	-11.11%	76684
Queen Anne's	2863	49.65%	2903	50.35%	-40	-0.69%	5766
St. Mary's	3367	45.64%	4010	54.36%	-643	-8.72%	7377
Somerset	3990	54.40%	3344	45.60%	646	8.81%	7334
Talbot	5126	61.18%	3253	38.82%	1873	22.35%	8379
Washington	17404	58.15%	12524	41.85%	4880	16.31%	29928
Wicomico	8571	60.93%	5497	39.07%	3074	21.85%	14068
Worcester	3983	59.25%	2739	40.75%	1244	18.51%	6722
Total	473059	53.02%	419108	46.98%	53951	6.05%	892167

==== Counties that flipped from Democratic to Republican ====
- Caroline
- Cecil
- Dorchester
- Harford
- Howard
- Kent
- Talbot
- Worcester

==== Counties that flipped from Republican to Democratic ====
- Baltimore (City)
- Garrett
- Prince George's

== See also ==
- 1956 United States Senate elections
- 1956 United States elections
