= 1970 United States Senate election in Maryland =

- November 3, 1970
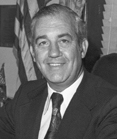

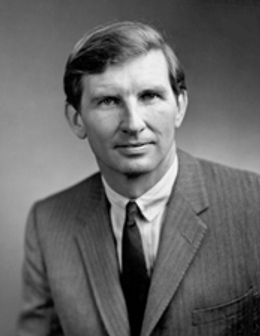
Nominee	J. Glenn Beall Jr.	Joseph Tydings
Party	Republican	Democratic
Popular vote	484,960	460,422
Percentage	50.71%	48.14%
- County results Beall: 50–60% 60–70% 70–80% Tydings: 50–60% 60–70%
U.S. senator before election
Joseph Tydings
Democratic
Elected U.S. Senator
J. Glenn Beall Jr.
Republican

The 1970 United States Senate election in Maryland took place on November 3, 1970. Incumbent Democratic U.S. Senator Joseph Tydings ran for re-election to a second term, but was narrowly defeated by Republican U.S. Representative J. Glenn Beall Jr.

Tydings had defeated Beall's father, Senator James Glenn Beall six years earlier. Tydings's own adoptive father Millard had served as senator as well as Beall Sr., making this a rare dynastic election between the sons of former senators.

As of 2024, this was the last time a Republican won the Class 1 Senate seat in Maryland.

== Democratic primary ==
=== Candidates ===
- Walter Gilchrist Finch, Baltimore patent lawyer
- George P. Mahoney, nominee for Governor in 1966
- Joseph Tydings, incumbent Senator
- Charles D. White

=== Results ===
1970 Democratic U.S. Senate primary
Party	Candidate	Votes	%
Democratic	Joseph Tydings (incumbent)	242,874	52.68%
Democratic	George P. Mahoney	173,157	37.56%
Democratic	Walter Gilchrist Finch	33,361	7.24%
Democratic	Charles D. White	11,628	2.52%
Total votes		461,020	100.00%

== Republican primary ==
=== Candidates ===
- J. Glenn Beall Jr., U.S. Representative from Frostburg and son of former Senator J. Glenn Beall Sr.
- Wainwright Dawson
- Harry L. Simms

=== Results ===
1970 Republican U.S. Senate primary
Party	Candidate	Votes	%
Republican	J. Glenn Beall Jr.	99,687	83.49%
Republican	Harry L. Simms	9,927	8.31%
Republican	Wainwright Dawson	9,786	8.20%
Total votes		119,400	100.00%

== Results ==
1970 U.S. Senate election in Maryland
Party	Candidate	Votes	%	±%
Republican	J. Glenn Beall Jr.	484,960	50.71%	▲13.49
Democratic	Joseph Tydings (incumbent)	460,422	48.14%	▼14.64
American	Harvey Wilder	10,988	1.15%	N/A
Total votes		956,370	100.00%	
Republican gain from Democratic				

=== Results by county ===
County	J. Glenn Beall Republican		Joseph Tydings Democratic		Harvey Wilder American		Margin		Total Votes Cast
County	#	%	#	%	#	%	#	%	Total Votes Cast
Allegany	16432	64.96%	8425	33.31%	437	1.73%	8007	31.66%	25294
Anne Arundel	39649	60.54%	24986	38.15%	857	1.31%	14663	22.39%	65492
Baltimore	101631	57.17%	74479	41.89%	1668	0.94%	27152	15.27%	177778
Baltimore City	66552	33.47%	128392	64.58%	3876	1.95%	-61840	-31.10%	198820
Calvert	2854	56.68%	2141	42.52%	40	0.79%	713	14.16%	5035
Caroline	3034	70.79%	1227	28.63%	25	0.58%	1807	42.16%	4286
Carroll	12015	75.18%	3804	23.80%	163	1.02%	8211	51.38%	15982
Cecil	7527	63.67%	4184	35.39%	111	0.94%	3343	28.28%	11822
Charles	5828	58.50%	4062	40.77%	73	0.73%	1766	17.73%	9963
Dorchester	5119	69.81%	2108	28.75%	106	1.45%	3011	41.06%	7333
Frederick	14746	65.85%	7375	32.93%	272	1.21%	7371	32.92%	22393
Garrett	4701	78.93%	1182	19.85%	73	1.23%	3519	59.08%	5956
Harford	15405	60.27%	9940	38.89%	213	0.83%	5465	21.38%	25558
Howard	10097	61.95%	6061	37.19%	141	0.87%	4036	24.76%	16299
Kent	3502	65.37%	1818	33.94%	37	0.69%	1684	31.44%	5357
Montgomery	68020	43.08%	88952	56.33%	933	0.59%	-20932	-13.26%	157905
Prince George's	59385	46.01%	68356	52.96%	1327	1.03%	-8971	-6.95%	129068
Queen Anne's	3073	63.30%	1753	36.11%	29	0.60%	1320	27.19%	4855
St. Mary's	4298	54.38%	3555	44.98%	50	0.63%	743	9.40%	7903
Somerset	3995	68.37%	1805	30.89%	43	0.74%	2190	37.48%	5843
Talbot	4852	69.05%	2143	30.50%	32	0.46%	2709	38.55%	7027
Washington	19088	67.85%	8611	30.61%	435	1.55%	10477	37.24%	28134
Wicomico	9305	69.99%	3883	29.21%	106	0.80%	5422	40.79%	13294
Worcester	3852	75.93%	1180	23.26%	41	0.81%	2672	52.67%	5073
Total	484960	50.70%	460422	48.14%	11088	1.16%	24538	2.57%	956470

==== Counties that flipped from Democratic to Republican ====
- Anne Arundel
- Baltimore (County)
- Calvert
- Caroline
- Cecil
- Charles
- Frederick
- Harford
- Howard
- Kent
- Queen Anne's
- St. Mary's
- Talbot
- Washington
- Wicomico

== See also ==
- 1970 United States Senate elections
- 1970 United States elections
