= 1966 Maryland gubernatorial election =

- November 8, 1966
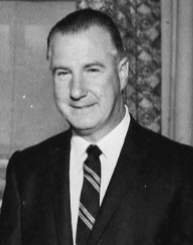

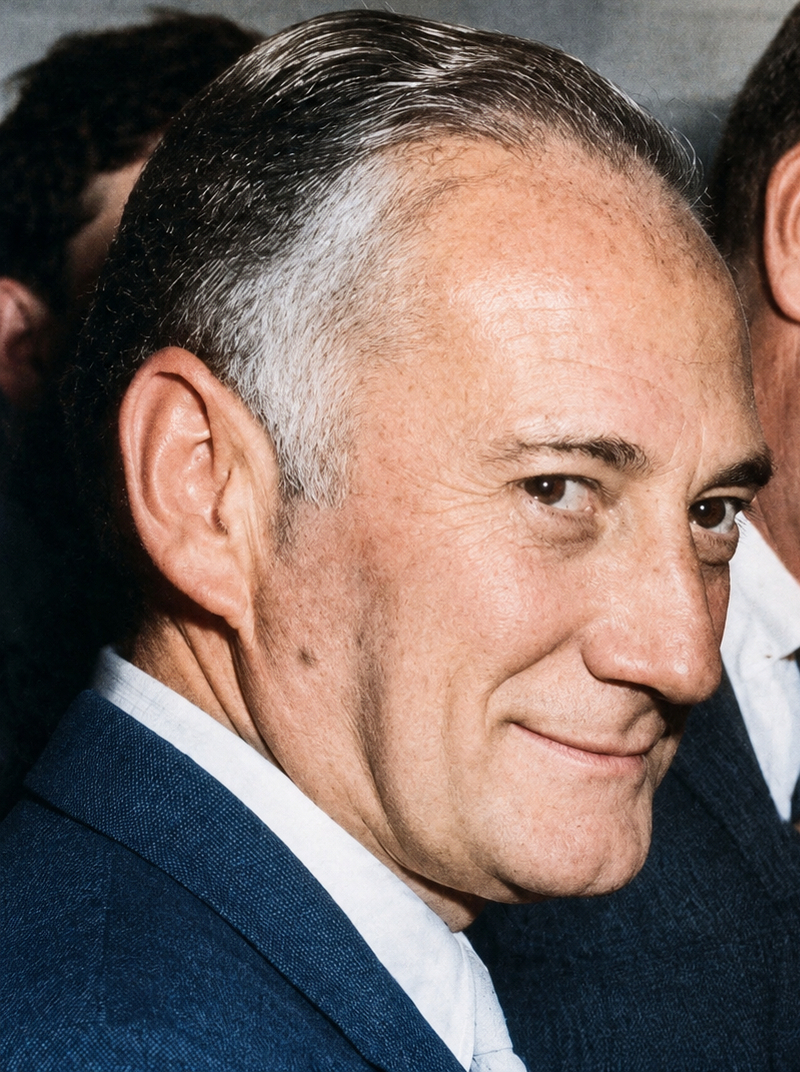
Nominee	Spiro Agnew	George P. Mahoney	Hyman A. Pressman
Party	Republican	Democratic	Independent
Popular vote	455,318	373,543	90,899
Percentage	49.50%	40.61%	9.88%
- County results Agnew: 40–50% 50–60% 70–80% Mahoney: 40–50% 50–60% 60–70%
Governor before election
J. Millard Tawes
Democratic
Elected Governor
Spiro Agnew
Republican

The 1966 Maryland gubernatorial election was held on November 8, 1966. Incumbent Democratic governor J. Millard Tawes was unable to seek a third term in office. In the election to succeed him, George P. Mahoney, a controversial segregationist, emerged from the Democratic primary due to splintered support for the two major candidates. Baltimore County Executive Spiro Agnew, was nominated by the Republican Party as their gubernatorial candidate. Mahoney and Agnew squared off, along with independent candidate Hyman A. Pressman. Ultimately, Agnew was victorious over Mahoney, with Pressman a distant third. This year was the last time that the state of Maryland elected a Republican governor until 2002. Agnew was later nominated for vice president by the Republican National Convention, per Richard Nixon's request, in 1968, an election he and Nixon won.

This election marks the last time the following Independent city and Counties have voted Republican in a gubernatorial election: Baltimore City, Montgomery, and Prince George's.

== Democratic primary ==
=== Candidates ===
- George P. Mahoney, Baltimore paving contractor and perennial candidate
- Carlton R. Sickles, U.S. representative from Lanham (representing Maryland at-large)
- Thomas B. Finan, Attorney General of Maryland
- Clarence W. Miles, lawyer and community activist
- Charles J. Luthardt Sr.
- Morgan L. Amaimo, real estate broker and perennial candidate
- Ross Zimmerman Pierpont, surgeon
- Andrew J. Easter, perennial candidate

=== Results ===
Primary results Mahoney: 20–30% 30–40% 40–50% 50–60% Sickles: 30–40% 40–50% 50–60% 70–80% Finan: 40–50% 50–60% Miles: 50–60%

Democratic Primary results
Party	Candidate	Votes	%
Democratic	George P. Mahoney	148,446	30.21
Democratic	Carlton R. Sickles	146,607	29.84
Democratic	Thomas B. Finan	134,216	27.31
Democratic	Clarence W. Miles	42,304	8.61
Democratic	Charles J. Ludhardt, Sr.	7,336	1.49
Democratic	Morgan L. Amaimo	6,048	1.23
Democratic	Ross Zimmerman Pierpont	4,311	0.88
Democratic	Andrew J. Easter	2,098	0.43
Total votes		491,366	100.00

== Republican primary ==
=== Candidates ===
- Spiro Agnew, Baltimore County Executive
- Andrew John Groszer Jr.
- John J. Harbaugh, Democratic candidate for the United States Senate in 1964
- Henry J. Laque Jr., perennial candidate
- Louis R. Milio, Maryland congressional candidate

=== Results ===
Republican primary results
Party	Candidate	Votes	%
Republican	Spiro Agnew	98,531	83.16
Republican	Andrew John Groszer, Jr.	9,987	8.43
Republican	John J. Harbaugh	4,322	3.65
Republican	Henry J. Laque, Jr.	3,365	2.84
Republican	Louis R. Milio	2,277	1.92
Total votes		118,482	100.00

== General election ==
=== Campaign ===
Baltimore paving contractor and perennial candidate George P. Mahoney won the Democratic primary on a segregationist platform, which was possible due to the presence of several strong candidates. Mahoney's slogan, "Your home is your castle--protect it", as well as his stance on many civil rights issues, prompted Baltimore City Comptroller Hyman A. Pressman to enter the race as an independent candidate. Mahoney's controversial stances caused many in the Maryland Democratic Party to split their support between Agnew, which was possible due to his socially progressive views, and Pressman, which enabled Agnew to win the election with a plurality, taking 70% of the black vote.

=== Results ===
Maryland gubernatorial election, 1966
Party	Candidate	Votes	%	±%
Republican	Spiro Agnew	455,318	49.50%	+5.15%
Democratic	George P. Mahoney	373,543	40.61%	−15.03%
Independent	Hyman A. Pressman	90,899	9.88%	
Write-ins		1	0.00%	
Majority		81,775	8.89%	−2.39%
Turnout		919,761		
Republican gain from Democratic		Swing		
