= 1942 Maryland gubernatorial election =

- November 3, 1942
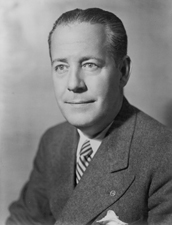

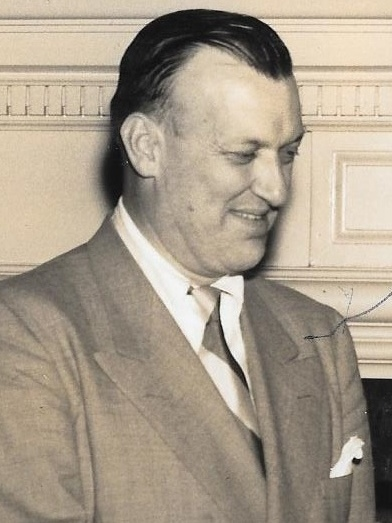
Nominee	Herbert O'Conor	Theodore McKeldin
Party	Democratic	Republican
Popular vote	198,488	179,204
Percentage	52.55%	47.45%
- County results O'Conor: 50–60% 60–70% McKeldin: 50–60%
Governor before election
Herbert O'Conor
Democratic
Elected Governor
Herbert O'Conor
Democratic

The 1942 Maryland gubernatorial election was held on November 3, 1942. Incumbent Democrat Herbert O'Conor defeated Republican nominee Theodore McKeldin with 52.55% of the vote.

== General election ==
=== Candidates ===
- Herbert O'Conor, Democratic
- Theodore McKeldin, Republican

=== Results ===
1942 Maryland gubernatorial election
Party	Candidate	Votes	%	±%
Democratic	Herbert O'Conor (incumbent)	198,488	52.55%	
Republican	Theodore McKeldin	179,204	47.45%	
Majority		19,284		
Turnout				
Democratic hold		Swing		
