= J. Glenn Beall =

American politician (1894–1971)

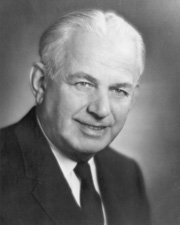

United States Senator from Maryland
- In office January 3, 1953 – January 3, 1965
- Preceded by: Herbert O'Conor
- Succeeded by: Joseph Tydings

Member of the U.S. House of Representatives from Maryland's 6th district
- In office January 3, 1943 – January 3, 1953
- Preceded by: Katharine Byron
- Succeeded by: DeWitt Hyde

Member of the Maryland Senate
- In office 1930–1934

Personal details
- Born: James Glenn Beall; June 5, 1894 Frostburg, Maryland, U.S.
- Died: January 14, 1971 (aged 76) Frostburg, Maryland, U.S.
- Party: Republican
- Spouse: Margaret Schwarzenbach
- Children: 3, including Glenn and George
- Education: Gettysburg College

Military service
- Branch/service: United States Army
- Years of service: 1918–1919
- Unit: Ordnance Corps

James Glenn Beall (June 5, 1894 – January 14, 1971) was an American businessman and politician. A member of the Republican Party, he served as a U.S. representative (1943–1953) and a U.S. senator (1953–1965) from Maryland.

== Early life and education ==
J. Glenn Beall was born in Frostburg, Maryland, to Olin and Florence (née Glenn) Beall. He was a descendant of Colonel Ninian Beall, who immigrated from Scotland in 1658 as an indentured servant and eventually became a wealthy landowner. His maternal grandfather served as a captain in the Confederate Army during the Civil War. As a child, Beall suffered from polio and underwent several operations before age 12; his left arm and leg were permanently withered. He received his early education at public schools in Frostburg, and then studied at Gettysburg College in Pennsylvania.

== Early business and political career ==
Beall briefly worked in a clerical capacity at the First National Bank of Frostburg. During World War I, he served in the United States Army Ordnance Corps (1918–1919), being discharged as a sergeant. He subsequently worked in the insurance and real estate business in Frostburg and Cumberland, establishing the Beall Insurance & Realty Company in 1919.

Beall began his political career as a member of the Allegany County Road Commission, serving in that position from 1923 to 1930. In 1926, he married Margaret Schwarzenbach (1900–2005), to whom he remained married until his death; the couple had three sons, including John Glenn Beall Jr. and George Beall. He served one term in the Maryland State Senate, where he represented Allegany County, from 1930 to 1934. He then became a member of the Maryland State Roads Commission, serving as chairman from 1938 to 1939.

== Congressional career ==
=== House ===
In 1942, after Democratic incumbent Katharine Byron decided to retire, Beall was elected as a Republican to the U.S. House of Representatives from Maryland's 6th congressional district. He defeated Democrat E. Brooke Lee, a former Speaker of the Maryland House of Delegates, by a margin of 59%-40%. He was subsequently re-elected to four more terms. During his 10-year tenure in the House, he served on the committees on the District of Columbia, flood control, roads and public works.

=== Senate ===
In 1952, following the retirement of Democratic incumbent Herbert O'Conor, Beall was elected to the U.S. Senate from Maryland. He defeated Democrat George P. Mahoney, a former chairman of the State Racing Commission, by a margin of 52%-47%. His 449,823 votes were the largest number a Republican Senate candidate ever received in Maryland.

During his Senate career, Beall earned a reputation as a moderate Republican. In 1954, he served as chairman of a subcommittee of the Senate Banking and Currency Committee that investigated a dramatic rise in coffee prices. He supported home rule for the District of Columbia, ceasefire with China, and the creation of a national institute for medical research. He also introduced legislation to create an Inland Navigation Commission, to permit voluntary non-sectarian prayer in public schools, and to turn White Sand Island off the Maryland coast into a federal recreation area. Beall did not sign the 1956 Southern Manifesto, and voted in favor of the Civil Rights Acts of 1957, 1960, and 1964, as well as the 24th Amendment to the U.S. Constitution.

Beall was narrowly re-elected in 1958 after defeating Democrat Thomas D'Alesandro Jr., the mayor of Baltimore and father of future House Speaker Nancy Pelosi, by a margin of 51%-49%. However, he was heavily defeated in his bid for a third term in 1964; he lost to Democrat Joseph Tydings, the United States Attorney for the District of Maryland (a position Beall's son George later held from 1970 to 1975), by a margin of 63%-37%. Beall's son, J. Glenn Beall Jr. in turn defeated Tydings for re-election in 1970. Maryland's other U.S. Senate seat had been held by Millard Tydings (the father of Joseph) from 1927 to 1951. As a consequence of this, Maryland was represented by a father and son of the Tydings family, and then a father and son of the Beall family, trading seats almost (with a break only from January 3, 1951 – January 3, 1953) consecutively from 1927 to 1977 (Tydings 1927–1951, Beall 1953–1965, Tydings 1965–1971, and Beall 1971–1977), when the chain was broken by the re-election defeat of J. Glenn Beall, Jr. in 1976 by Democrat Paul Sarbanes, the father of U.S. Representative John Sarbanes.

== Later life and death ==
Beall returned to Frostburg, where he resumed his insurance business. He also served as president of the League for Crippled Children of Allegany County, of the Cumberland Fair Association, and of the First National Bank of Western Maryland.

Beall died at age 76, and is buried in the Frostburg Memorial Park.

Party political offices
Preceded by D. John Markey	Republican nominee for United States Senator from Maryland (Class 1); 1952, 1958, 1964	Succeeded by J. Glenn Beall Jr.
U.S. House of Representatives
Preceded by Katharine Byron	Member of the U.S. House of Representatives from Maryland's 6th congressional district 1943–1953	Succeeded by DeWitt Hyde
U.S. Senate
Preceded by Herbert O'Conor	U.S. senator (Class 1) from Maryland; 1953–1965; Served alongside: John Marshall Butler, Daniel Brewster	Succeeded by Joseph Tydings
