= Herbert O'Conor =

American politician (1896-1960)

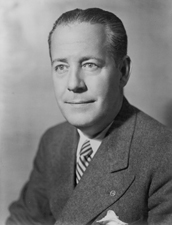

United States Senator from Maryland
- In office January 3, 1947 – January 3, 1953
- Preceded by: George L. P. Radcliffe
- Succeeded by: James Glenn Beall

Chair of the National Governors Association
- In office June 21, 1942 – June 20, 1943
- Preceded by: Harold Stassen
- Succeeded by: Leverett Saltonstall

51st Governor of Maryland
- In office January 11, 1939 – January 3, 1947
- Preceded by: Harry Nice
- Succeeded by: William Preston Lane Jr.

Attorney General of Maryland
- In office January 9, 1935 – January 11, 1939
- Governor: Harry Nice
- Preceded by: William Preston Lane Jr.
- Succeeded by: William C. Walsh

Personal details
- Born: Herbert Romulus O'Conor; November 17, 1896 Baltimore, Maryland, U.S.
- Died: March 4, 1960 (aged 63) Baltimore, Maryland, U.S.
- Party: Democratic
- Spouse: Eugenia Byrnes (m. 1920)
- Children: 5
- Education: Loyola University, Maryland (BA); University of Maryland, Baltimore (LLB)

Military service
- Allegiance: United States
- Branch/service: United States Navy
- Unit: United States Naval Reserve
- Battles/wars: World War I

Herbert Romulus O'Conor (November 17, 1896 – March 4, 1960) was an American lawyer serving as the 51st governor of Maryland from 1939 to 1947. He also served in the United States Senate, representing Maryland from 1947 to 1953. He was a Democrat.

== Early life and education ==
O'Conor was born in Baltimore, Maryland to James P. A. O'Conor and Mary Ann (Galvin) O'Conor. He received his B.A. degree from Loyola College and graduated from the University of Maryland School of Law in 1920. While in school, O'Conor was a reporter for the Baltimore Sun and Baltimore Evening Sun from 1919 to 1920. On November 24, 1920, O'Conor married Mary Eugenia Byrnes (1896–1971) and they had five children, Herbert R. Jr., Eugene F., James Patrick, Robert and Mary Patricia.

== Career ==
From 1921 to 1922, O'Conor served as the assistant State's Attorney of Baltimore. In 1923, he was elected State's Attorney of Baltimore City, and served there until he was elected as the Attorney General of Maryland in 1934. O'Conor also served in the National Association of Attorneys General in 1937. His secretary, Camilla Conroy, died in the burning of the luxury liner SS Morro Castle in 1934. O'Conor identified her body which was found floating face down close to the wreck site.

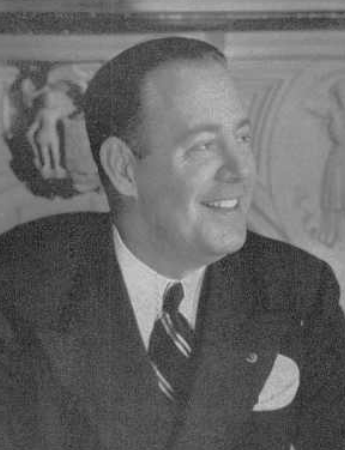
O'Conor as governor.

O'Conor was elected as Governor of Maryland in 1938, defeating incumbent Republican governor Harry W. Nice. In doing so, he became the first Roman Catholic of Irish descent to serve in that position. As governor, O'Conor created the Maryland Council of Defense during the Second World War.

He also worked towards improving the state transportation system, and worked towards the construction of new bridges over the Susquehanna and Potomac Rivers. He also worked with other states to encourage inter-state cooperation, and served in positions including the Chairman of the Governor's Conference in 1941, and the President of the Council of State Government in 1943.

Near the end of World War II, O'Conor sought to improve the effects of the War and founded the Commission on Post War Reconstruction and Development. He also sought to improve the Maryland healthcare system.

O'Conor was elected to the United States Senate in 1946, but chose not to run for re-election in 1952. In the Senate, O'Conor served as chairman of the Special Committee on Organized Crime in Interstate Commerce from May to September, 1951, during the Eighty-first Congress.

== Death ==
After his tenure in the Senate, he continued the practice of law in Baltimore and Washington, D.C., until his death in Baltimore. He is interred in New Cathedral Cemetery.

== Building dedications ==
- Herbert R. O'Conor State Building in Baltimore, Maryland. A building created by an early James Rouse and Guy T. O. Hollyday committee using the 1947 Federal Redevelopment Act funds to subsidize development and resale for a profit.

Legal offices
Preceded by William Preston Lane Jr.	Attorney General of Maryland; 1935–1939	Succeeded by William C. Walsh
Party political offices
Preceded by Albert Ritchie	Democratic nominee for Governor of Maryland; 1938, 1942	Succeeded by William Preston Lane Jr.
Preceded by George L. P. Radcliffe	Democratic nominee for U.S. Senator from Maryland (Class 1); 1946	Succeeded by George P. Mahoney
Political offices
Preceded by Harry Nice	Governor of Maryland; 1939–1947	Succeeded by William Preston Lane Jr.
Preceded by Harold Stassen	Chair of the National Governors Association; 1942–1943	Succeeded by Leverett Saltonstall
U.S. Senate
Preceded by George L. P. Radcliffe	United States Senator (Class 1) from Maryland; 1947–1953; Served alongside: Millard Tydings, John Butler	Succeeded by James Glenn Beall
