= J. Glenn Beall Jr. =

American politician and businessman (1927–2006)

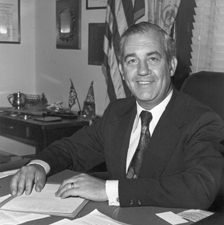

United States Senator from Maryland
- In office January 3, 1971 – January 3, 1977
- Preceded by: Joseph Tydings
- Succeeded by: Paul Sarbanes

Member of the U.S. House of Representatives from Maryland's 6th district
- In office January 3, 1969 – January 3, 1971
- Preceded by: Charles Mathias
- Succeeded by: Goodloe Byron

Member of the Maryland House of Delegates
- In office 1962–1966

Personal details
- Born: James Glenn Beall Jr. June 19, 1927 Cumberland, Maryland, U.S.
- Died: March 24, 2006 (aged 78) Frostburg, Maryland, U.S.
- Party: Republican
- Spouse: Nancy Beall
- Relations: George Beall (brother)
- Parent(s): J. Glenn Beall; Margaret Schwarzenbach
- Education: Yale University

Military service
- Branch/service: United States Navy
- Years of service: 1945–1946

John Glenn Beall Jr. (June 19, 1927 – March 24, 2006) was an American politician and businessman from the U.S. state of Maryland. A member of the Republican Party, he served in both chambers of the United States Congress for one term each, a member of the United States House of Representatives from 1969 to 1971, and as a member of the United States Senate from 1971 to 1977. He was also a member of the Maryland House of Delegates from 1962 to 1968.

== Life and career ==
Beall was born in Cumberland, Maryland, the eldest of three. His father was J. Glenn Beall, who served in both chambers of the United States Congress as a U.S. Representative from Maryland's 6th congressional district (1943–1953) and as a U.S. Senator from Maryland (1953–1965). His younger brother, George Beall, served as United States Attorney for the District of Maryland (1970–1975), and in 1973, prosecuted Vice President Spiro Agnew for bribery.

Beall served in the United States Navy from 1945 to 1946 and graduated from Yale University in 1950. While at Yale, he was an active member of the Yale Political Union. He then went into the insurance business as a member of the general insurance firm of Beall, Garner & Geare, Inc.

In 1962, Beall was elected as a Republican to the Maryland House of Delegates and was re-elected in 1966. He served as minority floor leader from 1963 until his 1968 election to the 91st Congress.

Beall served one term in the U.S. House, representing Maryland's 6th congressional district, and then ran for the U.S. Senate in 1970, narrowly defeating incumbent Democrat Joseph Tydings. Six years later, he lost re-election to Paul Sarbanes by 39% to 57%. His eighteen-point margin of defeat was one of the widest for an incumbent senator in U.S. history. With Aris T. Allen as his running mate, Beall ran for Governor of Maryland in 1978 but lost to Democratic nominee Harry Hughes by an overwhelming margin.

In the Senate, Beall "sponsored legislation that created the Senate Budget Office and the Congressional Budget Office. He served as one of the first members of the Senate Budget Committee. He was a principal sponsor of The Physician Manpower Shortage Act, which brought more doctors to rural areas, and the C&O Canal Development Act, establishing the Chesapeake and Ohio Canal National Historical Park, among others."

Beall served as the president and chairman of the charity The League for Crippled Children from 1978 until the time of his death.

Beall resumed the insurance business in Cumberland and was very active in the local community until his death. He died at the age of 78 at his home in Frostburg, Maryland, on March 24, 2006, as a result of the carcinoid cancer he had been diagnosed with in 1998. He was interred in Frostburg Memorial Park Cemetery.

== Notes ==
- United States Congress. "J. Glenn Beall Jr. (id: B000272)". Biographical Directory of the United States Congress.

U.S. House of Representatives
Preceded by Charles Mathias	Member of the U.S. House of Representatives from Maryland's 6th congressional district 1969–1971	Succeeded by Goodloe Byron
U.S. Senate
Preceded by Joseph Tydings	U.S. senator (Class 1) from Maryland; 1971–1977; Served alongside: Charles Mathias	Succeeded by Paul Sarbanes
Party political offices
Preceded by J. Glenn Beall	Republican nominee for United States Senator from Maryland (Class 1); 1970, 1976	Succeeded by Lawrence Hogan
Preceded by Louise Gore	Republican nominee for Governor of Maryland; 1978	Succeeded by Robert A. Pascal
