= 1931 Baltimore mayoral election =

Baltimore mayoral election, 1931
- May 5, 1931
| Candidate | Howard W. Jackson | William Albrecht |
| Party | Democratic | Republican |
| Popular vote | 120,355 | 57,191 |
| Percentage | 67.79% | 32.21% |
Mayor before election
William Frederick Broening
Republican
Elected mayor
Howard W. Jackson
Democratic

The 1931 Baltimore mayoral election was held on Tuesday May 5. It saw the return of Howard W. Jackson to the mayoralty for a second nonconsecutive term.

== General election ==
The general election was held May 5.

Baltimore mayoral general election, 1931
| Party | Candidate | Votes | % |
|---|---|---|---|
| Democratic | Howard W. Jackson | 120,355 | 67.79% |
| Republican | William Albrecht | 67.79 | 32.21% |
| Total votes | | 177,546 | |
