= List of United States senators from Maryland =

Current delegation

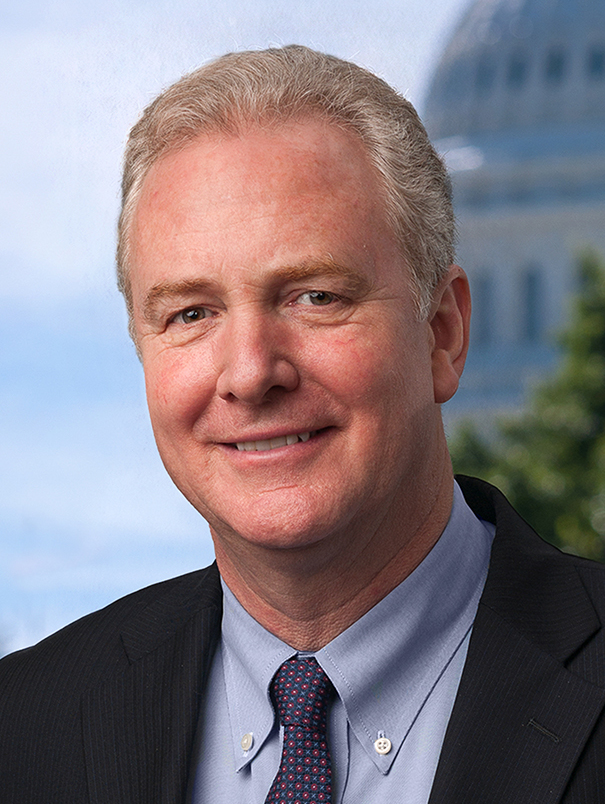
Chris Van Hollen (D)

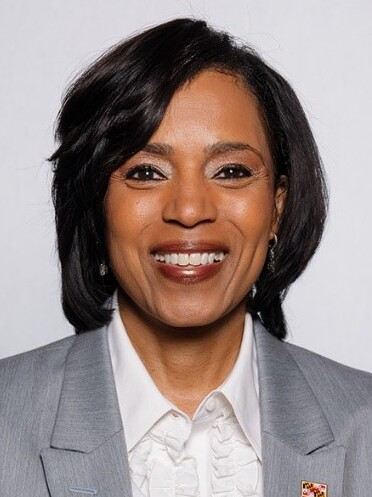
Angela Alsobrooks (D)

(ordered by seniority)

This is a list of United States senators from Maryland, which ratified the United States Constitution April 28, 1788, becoming the seventh state to do so. To provide for continuity of government, the framers divided senators into staggered classes that serve six-year terms, and Maryland's senators are in the first and third classes. Before the passage of the Seventeenth Amendment to the United States Constitution in 1913, which allowed for direct election of senators, Maryland's senators were chosen by the Maryland General Assembly, which ratified the amendment on April 1, 2010. Until the assembly appointed George L. Wellington of Cumberland in 1897, senators in class 3 were chosen from the Eastern Shore while senators in class 1 were chosen from the remainder of the state. Barbara Mikulski has been Maryland's longest-serving senator (1987–2017).

== List of senators ==
Class 1 Class 1 senators belong to the electoral cycle that most recently had regular elections in 2006, 2012, 2018, and 2024. The next election will be in 2030.						C	Class 3 Class 3 senators belong to the electoral cycle that most recently had regular elections in 2004, 2010, 2016, and 2022. The next election will be in 2028.					
#	Senator	Party	Dates in office	Electoral history	T	C	T	Electoral history	Dates in office	Party	Senator	#
1	Charles Carroll (Annapolis)	Pro- Admin.	Mar 4, 1789 – Nov 30, 1792	Elected in 1788.	1	1st	1	Elected in 1788.	Mar 4, 1789 – Dec 10, 1797	Pro- Admin.	John Henry (Dorchester County)	1
1	Charles Carroll (Annapolis)	Pro- Admin.	Mar 4, 1789 – Nov 30, 1792	Re-elected in 1791. Resigned to remain in the Maryland Senate.	2	2nd	1	Elected in 1788.	Mar 4, 1789 – Dec 10, 1797	Pro- Admin.	John Henry (Dorchester County)	1
Vacant			Nov 30, 1792 – Jan 10, 1793		2	2nd	1	Elected in 1788.	Mar 4, 1789 – Dec 10, 1797	Pro- Admin.	John Henry (Dorchester County)	1
2	Richard Potts (Frederick)	Pro- Admin.	Jan 10, 1793 – Oct 24, 1796	Elected to finish Carroll's term. Resigned.	2	2nd	1	Elected in 1788.	Mar 4, 1789 – Dec 10, 1797	Pro- Admin.	John Henry (Dorchester County)	1
2	Richard Potts (Frederick)	Pro- Admin.	Jan 10, 1793 – Oct 24, 1796	Elected to finish Carroll's term. Resigned.	2	3rd	1	Elected in 1788.	Mar 4, 1789 – Dec 10, 1797	Pro- Admin.	John Henry (Dorchester County)	1
2	Richard Potts (Frederick)	Pro- Admin.	Jan 10, 1793 – Oct 24, 1796	Elected to finish Carroll's term. Resigned.	2	4th	2	Re-elected in 1795. Resigned to become Governor of Maryland.	Mar 4, 1789 – Dec 10, 1797	Pro- Admin.	John Henry (Dorchester County)	1
Vacant			Oct 24, 1796 – Nov 30, 1796		2	4th	2	Re-elected in 1795. Resigned to become Governor of Maryland.	Mar 4, 1789 – Dec 10, 1797	Pro- Admin.	John Henry (Dorchester County)	1
3	John Eager Howard (Baltimore County)	Federalist	Nov 30, 1796 – Mar 3, 1803	Elected to finish Carroll's term.	2	4th	2	Re-elected in 1795. Resigned to become Governor of Maryland.	Mar 4, 1789 – Dec 10, 1797	Pro- Admin.	John Henry (Dorchester County)	1
3	John Eager Howard (Baltimore County)	Federalist	Nov 30, 1796 – Mar 3, 1803	Re-elected in 1796. Lost re-election.	3	5th	2	Re-elected in 1795. Resigned to become Governor of Maryland.	Mar 4, 1789 – Dec 10, 1797	Pro- Admin.	John Henry (Dorchester County)	1
3	John Eager Howard (Baltimore County)	Federalist	Nov 30, 1796 – Mar 3, 1803	Re-elected in 1796. Lost re-election.	3	5th	2	Elected to finish Henry's term. Resigned.	Dec 11, 1797 – Dec 1, 1800	Federalist	James Lloyd (Chestertown)	2
3	John Eager Howard (Baltimore County)	Federalist	Nov 30, 1796 – Mar 3, 1803	Re-elected in 1796. Lost re-election.	3	6th	2	Elected to finish Henry's term. Resigned.	Dec 11, 1797 – Dec 1, 1800	Federalist	James Lloyd (Chestertown)	2
3	John Eager Howard (Baltimore County)	Federalist	Nov 30, 1796 – Mar 3, 1803	Re-elected in 1796. Lost re-election.	3	6th	2		Dec 1, 1800 – Dec 12, 1800	Vacant		
3	John Eager Howard (Baltimore County)	Federalist	Nov 30, 1796 – Mar 3, 1803	Re-elected in 1796. Lost re-election.	3	6th	2	Elected to finish Henry's term.	Dec 12, 1800 – Nov 19, 1801	Federalist	William Hindman (Talbot County)	3
3	John Eager Howard (Baltimore County)	Federalist	Nov 30, 1796 – Mar 3, 1803	Re-elected in 1796. Lost re-election.	3	7th	3	Appointed to fill the vacancy after the Legislature failed to elect. Retired when successor elected.	Dec 12, 1800 – Nov 19, 1801	Federalist	William Hindman (Talbot County)	3
3	John Eager Howard (Baltimore County)	Federalist	Nov 30, 1796 – Mar 3, 1803	Re-elected in 1796. Lost re-election.	3	7th	3	Elected to finish term. Resigned to become Governor of Maryland.	Nov 19, 1801 – Nov 12, 1806	Democratic- Republican	Robert Wright (Chestertown)	4
4	Samuel Smith (Baltimore)	Democratic- Republican	Mar 4, 1803 – Mar 3, 1815	Elected in 1802.	4	8th	3	Elected to finish term. Resigned to become Governor of Maryland.	Nov 19, 1801 – Nov 12, 1806	Democratic- Republican	Robert Wright (Chestertown)	4
4	Samuel Smith (Baltimore)	Democratic- Republican	Mar 4, 1803 – Mar 3, 1815	Elected in 1802.	4	9th	3	Elected to finish term. Resigned to become Governor of Maryland.	Nov 19, 1801 – Nov 12, 1806	Democratic- Republican	Robert Wright (Chestertown)	4
4	Samuel Smith (Baltimore)	Democratic- Republican	Mar 4, 1803 – Mar 3, 1815	Elected in 1802.	4	9th	3		Nov 12, 1806 – Nov 25, 1806	Vacant		
4	Samuel Smith (Baltimore)	Democratic- Republican	Mar 4, 1803 – Mar 3, 1815	Elected in 1802.	4	9th	3	Elected to finish Wright's term.	Nov 25, 1806 – Mar 3, 1813	Democratic- Republican	Philip Reed (Chestertown)	5
4	Samuel Smith (Baltimore)	Democratic- Republican	Mar 4, 1803 – Mar 3, 1815	Elected in 1802.	4	10th	4	Re-elected in 1806.	Nov 25, 1806 – Mar 3, 1813	Democratic- Republican	Philip Reed (Chestertown)	5
4	Samuel Smith (Baltimore)	Democratic- Republican	Mar 4, 1803 – Mar 3, 1815	Re-elected in 1809. [data missing]	5	11th	4	Re-elected in 1806.	Nov 25, 1806 – Mar 3, 1813	Democratic- Republican	Philip Reed (Chestertown)	5
4	Samuel Smith (Baltimore)	Democratic- Republican	Mar 4, 1803 – Mar 3, 1815	Re-elected in 1809. [data missing]	5	12th	4	Re-elected in 1806.	Nov 25, 1806 – Mar 3, 1813	Democratic- Republican	Philip Reed (Chestertown)	5
4	Samuel Smith (Baltimore)	Democratic- Republican	Mar 4, 1803 – Mar 3, 1815	Re-elected in 1809. [data missing]	5	13th	5	Legislature failed to elect.	Mar 3, 1813 – May 21, 1813	Vacant		
4	Samuel Smith (Baltimore)	Democratic- Republican	Mar 4, 1803 – Mar 3, 1815	Re-elected in 1809. [data missing]	5	13th	5	Elected in 1813 to finish term. [data missing]	May 21, 1813 – Mar 3, 1819	Federalist	Robert Henry Goldsborough (Easton)	6
Vacant			Mar 4, 1815 – Jan 29, 1816	Legislature failed to elect	6	14th	5	Elected in 1813 to finish term. [data missing]	May 21, 1813 – Mar 3, 1819	Federalist	Robert Henry Goldsborough (Easton)	6
5	Robert Goodloe Harper (Baltimore)	Federalist	Jan 29, 1816 – Dec 6, 1816	Elected to finish term. Resigned.	6	14th	5	Elected in 1813 to finish term. [data missing]	May 21, 1813 – Mar 3, 1819	Federalist	Robert Henry Goldsborough (Easton)	6
Vacant			Dec 6, 1816 – Dec 20, 1816		6	14th	5	Elected in 1813 to finish term. [data missing]	May 21, 1813 – Mar 3, 1819	Federalist	Robert Henry Goldsborough (Easton)	6
6	Alexander Hanson (Elkridge)	Federalist	Dec 20, 1816 – Apr 23, 1819	Elected to finish the vacant term that happened from 1815 to 1816. Died.	6	14th	5	Elected in 1813 to finish term. [data missing]	May 21, 1813 – Mar 3, 1819	Federalist	Robert Henry Goldsborough (Easton)	6
6	Alexander Hanson (Elkridge)	Federalist	Dec 20, 1816 – Apr 23, 1819	Elected to finish the vacant term that happened from 1815 to 1816. Died.	6	15th	5	Elected in 1813 to finish term. [data missing]	May 21, 1813 – Mar 3, 1819	Federalist	Robert Henry Goldsborough (Easton)	6
6	Alexander Hanson (Elkridge)	Federalist	Dec 20, 1816 – Apr 23, 1819	Elected to finish the vacant term that happened from 1815 to 1816. Died.	6	16th	6	Legislature did not elect until after the term began.	Mar 4, 1819 – Dec 20, 1819	Vacant		
Vacant			Apr 23, 1819 – Dec 21, 1819		6	16th	6	Legislature did not elect until after the term began.	Mar 4, 1819 – Dec 20, 1819	Vacant		
7	William Pinkney (Baltimore)	Democratic- Republican	Dec 20, 1819 – Feb 25, 1822	Elected in 1819 to finish the vacant term that happened from 1815 to 1816.	6	16th	6	Elected late in 1819.	Dec 21, 1819 – Jan 14, 1826	Democratic- Republican	Edward Lloyd (Easton)	7
7	William Pinkney (Baltimore)	Democratic- Republican	Dec 20, 1819 – Feb 25, 1822	Re-elected in 1821. Died.	7	17th	6	Elected late in 1819.	Dec 21, 1819 – Jan 14, 1826	Democratic- Republican	Edward Lloyd (Easton)	7
Vacant			Feb 25, 1822 – Dec 17, 1822		7	17th	6	Elected late in 1819.	Dec 21, 1819 – Jan 14, 1826	Democratic- Republican	Edward Lloyd (Easton)	7
8	Samuel Smith (Baltimore)	Democratic- Republican	Dec 17, 1822 – Mar 3, 1833	Elected to finish Pinkney's term.	7	17th	6	Elected late in 1819.	Dec 21, 1819 – Jan 14, 1826	Democratic- Republican	Edward Lloyd (Easton)	7
8	Samuel Smith (Baltimore)	Democratic- Republican	Dec 17, 1822 – Mar 3, 1833	Elected to finish Pinkney's term.	7	18th	6	Elected late in 1819.	Dec 21, 1819 – Jan 14, 1826	Democratic- Republican	Edward Lloyd (Easton)	7
8	Samuel Smith (Baltimore)	Jacksonian	Dec 17, 1822 – Mar 3, 1833	Elected to finish Pinkney's term.	7	19th	7	Re-elected in 1825. Resigned.	Dec 21, 1819 – Jan 14, 1826	Jacksonian	Edward Lloyd (Easton)	7
8	Samuel Smith (Baltimore)	Jacksonian	Dec 17, 1822 – Mar 3, 1833	Elected to finish Pinkney's term.	7	19th	7		Jan 14, 1826 – Jan 24, 1826	Vacant		
8	Samuel Smith (Baltimore)	Jacksonian	Dec 17, 1822 – Mar 3, 1833	Elected to finish Pinkney's term.	7	19th	7	Elected to finish Lloyd's term.	Jan 24, 1826 – Dec 20, 1834	National; Republican	Ezekiel F. Chambers (Chestertown)	8
8	Samuel Smith (Baltimore)	Jacksonian	Dec 17, 1822 – Mar 3, 1833	Re-elected in 1827.	8	20th	7	Elected to finish Lloyd's term.	Jan 24, 1826 – Dec 20, 1834	National; Republican	Ezekiel F. Chambers (Chestertown)	8
8	Samuel Smith (Baltimore)	Jacksonian	Dec 17, 1822 – Mar 3, 1833	Re-elected in 1827.	8	21st	7	Elected to finish Lloyd's term.	Jan 24, 1826 – Dec 20, 1834	National; Republican	Ezekiel F. Chambers (Chestertown)	8
8	Samuel Smith (Baltimore)	Jacksonian	Dec 17, 1822 – Mar 3, 1833	Re-elected in 1827.	8	22nd	8	Re-elected in 1831. Resigned to become judge of the Maryland Court of Appeals.	Jan 24, 1826 – Dec 20, 1834	National; Republican	Ezekiel F. Chambers (Chestertown)	8
9	Joseph Kent (Bladensburg)	National; Republican	Mar 4, 1833 – Nov 24, 1837	Elected in 1833. Died.	9	23rd	8	Re-elected in 1831. Resigned to become judge of the Maryland Court of Appeals.	Jan 24, 1826 – Dec 20, 1834	National; Republican	Ezekiel F. Chambers (Chestertown)	8
9	Joseph Kent (Bladensburg)	National; Republican	Mar 4, 1833 – Nov 24, 1837	Elected in 1833. Died.	9	23rd	8		Dec 20, 1834 – Jan 13, 1835	Vacant		
9	Joseph Kent (Bladensburg)	National; Republican	Mar 4, 1833 – Nov 24, 1837	Elected in 1833. Died.	9	23rd	8	Elected to finish Chambers's term. Died.	Jan 13, 1835 – Oct 5, 1836	National; Republican	Robert Henry Goldsborough (Easton)	9
9	Joseph Kent (Bladensburg)	National; Republican	Mar 4, 1833 – Nov 24, 1837	Elected in 1833. Died.	9	24th	8	Elected to finish Chambers's term. Died.	Jan 13, 1835 – Oct 5, 1836	National; Republican	Robert Henry Goldsborough (Easton)	9
9	Joseph Kent (Bladensburg)	National; Republican	Mar 4, 1833 – Nov 24, 1837	Elected in 1833. Died.	9	24th	8		Oct 5, 1836 – Dec 31, 1836	Vacant		
9	Joseph Kent (Bladensburg)	National; Republican	Mar 4, 1833 – Nov 24, 1837	Elected in 1833. Died.	9	24th	8	Elected to finish Chambers's term.	Dec 31, 1836 – Oct 24, 1840	National; Republican	John S. Spence (Berlin)	10
9	Joseph Kent (Bladensburg)	Whig	Mar 4, 1833 – Nov 24, 1837	Elected in 1833. Died.	9	25th	9	Re-elected in 1837. Died.	Dec 31, 1836 – Oct 24, 1840	Whig	John S. Spence (Berlin)	10
Vacant			Nov 24, 1837 – Jan 4, 1838		9	25th	9	Re-elected in 1837. Died.	Dec 31, 1836 – Oct 24, 1840	Whig	John S. Spence (Berlin)	10
10	William Duhurst Merrick (Port Tobacco)	Whig	Jan 4, 1838 – Mar 3, 1845	Elected to finish Kent's term.	9	25th	9	Re-elected in 1837. Died.	Dec 31, 1836 – Oct 24, 1840	Whig	John S. Spence (Berlin)	10
10	William Duhurst Merrick (Port Tobacco)	Whig	Jan 4, 1838 – Mar 3, 1845	Re-elected in 1839. [data missing]	10	26th	9	Re-elected in 1837. Died.	Dec 31, 1836 – Oct 24, 1840	Whig	John S. Spence (Berlin)	10
10	William Duhurst Merrick (Port Tobacco)	Whig	Jan 4, 1838 – Mar 3, 1845	Re-elected in 1839. [data missing]	10	26th	9		Oct 24, 1840 – Jan 5, 1841	Vacant		
10	William Duhurst Merrick (Port Tobacco)	Whig	Jan 4, 1838 – Mar 3, 1845	Re-elected in 1839. [data missing]	10	26th	9	Elected to finish Spence's term. [data missing]	Jan 5, 1841 – Mar 3, 1843	Whig	John Leeds Kerr (Easton)	11
10	William Duhurst Merrick (Port Tobacco)	Whig	Jan 4, 1838 – Mar 3, 1845	Re-elected in 1839. [data missing]	10	27th	9	Elected to finish Spence's term. [data missing]	Jan 5, 1841 – Mar 3, 1843	Whig	John Leeds Kerr (Easton)	11
10	William Duhurst Merrick (Port Tobacco)	Whig	Jan 4, 1838 – Mar 3, 1845	Re-elected in 1839. [data missing]	10	28th	10	Elected in 1843.	Mar 4, 1843 – Dec 20, 1862	Whig	James Pearce (Chestertown)	12
11	Reverdy Johnson (Baltimore)	Whig	Mar 4, 1845 – Mar 7, 1849	Election year unknown. Resigned to become U.S. Attorney General.	11	29th	10	Elected in 1843.	Mar 4, 1843 – Dec 20, 1862	Whig	James Pearce (Chestertown)	12
11	Reverdy Johnson (Baltimore)	Whig	Mar 4, 1845 – Mar 7, 1849	Election year unknown. Resigned to become U.S. Attorney General.	11	30th	10	Elected in 1843.	Mar 4, 1843 – Dec 20, 1862	Whig	James Pearce (Chestertown)	12
11	Reverdy Johnson (Baltimore)	Whig	Mar 4, 1845 – Mar 7, 1849	Election year unknown. Resigned to become U.S. Attorney General.	11	31st	11	Re-elected in 1849.	Mar 4, 1843 – Dec 20, 1862	Whig	James Pearce (Chestertown)	12
Vacant			Mar 7, 1849 – Dec 6, 1849		11	31st	11	Re-elected in 1849.	Mar 4, 1843 – Dec 20, 1862	Whig	James Pearce (Chestertown)	12
12	David Stewart (Baltimore)	Democratic	Dec 6, 1849 – Jan 12, 1850	Appointed to continue Johnson's term. Retired when successor elected.	11	31st	11	Re-elected in 1849.	Mar 4, 1843 – Dec 20, 1862	Whig	James Pearce (Chestertown)	12
13	Thomas Pratt (Annapolis)	Whig	Jan 12, 1850 – Mar 3, 1857	Elected to finish Johnson's term.	11	31st	11	Re-elected in 1849.	Mar 4, 1843 – Dec 20, 1862	Whig	James Pearce (Chestertown)	12
13	Thomas Pratt (Annapolis)	Whig	Jan 12, 1850 – Mar 3, 1857	Re-elected in 1851.	12	32nd	11	Re-elected in 1849.	Mar 4, 1843 – Dec 20, 1862	Whig	James Pearce (Chestertown)	12
13	Thomas Pratt (Annapolis)	Whig	Jan 12, 1850 – Mar 3, 1857	Re-elected in 1851.	12	33rd	11	Re-elected in 1849.	Mar 4, 1843 – Dec 20, 1862	Whig	James Pearce (Chestertown)	12
13	Thomas Pratt (Annapolis)	Whig	Jan 12, 1850 – Mar 3, 1857	Re-elected in 1851.	12	34th	12	Re-elected in 1855.	Mar 4, 1843 – Dec 20, 1862	Whig	James Pearce (Chestertown)	12
14	Anthony Kennedy (Ellicott's Mills)	American	Mar 4, 1857 – Mar 3, 1863	Election year unknown. [data missing]	13	35th	12	Re-elected in 1855.	Mar 4, 1843 – Dec 20, 1862	Democratic	James Pearce (Chestertown)	12
14	Anthony Kennedy (Ellicott's Mills)	American	Mar 4, 1857 – Mar 3, 1863	Election year unknown. [data missing]	13	36th	12	Re-elected in 1855.	Mar 4, 1843 – Dec 20, 1862	Democratic	James Pearce (Chestertown)	12
14	Anthony Kennedy (Ellicott's Mills)	Union	Mar 4, 1857 – Mar 3, 1863	Election year unknown. [data missing]	13	37th	13	Re-elected in 1860. Died.	Mar 4, 1843 – Dec 20, 1862	Democratic	James Pearce (Chestertown)	12
14	Anthony Kennedy (Ellicott's Mills)	Union	Mar 4, 1857 – Mar 3, 1863	Election year unknown. [data missing]	13	37th	13		Dec 20, 1862 – Dec 29, 1862	Vacant		
14	Anthony Kennedy (Ellicott's Mills)	Union	Mar 4, 1857 – Mar 3, 1863	Election year unknown. [data missing]	13	37th	13	Appointed to continue Pearce's term. Elected in 1864 to finish Pearce's term. Died.	Dec 29, 1862 – Feb 14, 1865	Union	Thomas Holliday Hicks (Cambridge)	13
15	Reverdy Johnson (Baltimore)	Union	Mar 4, 1863 – Jul 10, 1868	Election year unknown. Resigned to become U.S. Ambassador to the United Kingdom of Great Britain and Ireland.	14	38th	13	Appointed to continue Pearce's term. Elected in 1864 to finish Pearce's term. Died.	Dec 29, 1862 – Feb 14, 1865	Union	Thomas Holliday Hicks (Cambridge)	13
15	Reverdy Johnson (Baltimore)	Union	Mar 4, 1863 – Jul 10, 1868	Election year unknown. Resigned to become U.S. Ambassador to the United Kingdom of Great Britain and Ireland.	14	38th	13		Feb 14, 1865 – Mar 9, 1865	Vacant		
15	Reverdy Johnson (Baltimore)	Democratic	Mar 4, 1863 – Jul 10, 1868	Election year unknown. Resigned to become U.S. Ambassador to the United Kingdom of Great Britain and Ireland.	14	39th	13		Feb 14, 1865 – Mar 9, 1865	Vacant		
15	Reverdy Johnson (Baltimore)	Democratic	Mar 4, 1863 – Jul 10, 1868	Election year unknown. Resigned to become U.S. Ambassador to the United Kingdom of Great Britain and Ireland.	14	39th	13	Elected to finish Pearce's term. [data missing]	Mar 9, 1865 – Mar 3, 1867	Unconditional Union	John Creswell (Elkton)	14
15	Reverdy Johnson (Baltimore)	Democratic	Mar 4, 1863 – Jul 10, 1868	Election year unknown. Resigned to become U.S. Ambassador to the United Kingdom of Great Britain and Ireland.	14	40th	14	Philip F. Thomas (D) was elected but failed to qualify due to his support for the Confederacy.	Mar 4, 1867 – Mar 7, 1868	Vacant		
15	Reverdy Johnson (Baltimore)	Democratic	Mar 4, 1863 – Jul 10, 1868	Election year unknown. Resigned to become U.S. Ambassador to the United Kingdom of Great Britain and Ireland.	14	40th	14	Elected to finish Thomas's term. [data missing]	Mar 7, 1868 – Mar 3, 1873	Democratic	George Vickers (Chestertown)	15
Vacant			Jul 10, 1868 – Jul 13, 1868		14	40th	14	Elected to finish Thomas's term. [data missing]	Mar 7, 1868 – Mar 3, 1873	Democratic	George Vickers (Chestertown)	15
16	William Whyte (Baltimore)	Democratic	Jul 13, 1868 – Mar 3, 1869	Appointed to finish Johnson's term. Retired.	14	40th	14	Elected to finish Thomas's term. [data missing]	Mar 7, 1868 – Mar 3, 1873	Democratic	George Vickers (Chestertown)	15
17	William T. Hamilton (Hagerstown)	Democratic	Mar 4, 1869 – Mar 3, 1875	Election year unknown. Retired to run for governor.	15	41st	14	Elected to finish Thomas's term. [data missing]	Mar 7, 1868 – Mar 3, 1873	Democratic	George Vickers (Chestertown)	15
17	William T. Hamilton (Hagerstown)	Democratic	Mar 4, 1869 – Mar 3, 1875	Election year unknown. Retired to run for governor.	15	42nd	14	Elected to finish Thomas's term. [data missing]	Mar 7, 1868 – Mar 3, 1873	Democratic	George Vickers (Chestertown)	15
17	William T. Hamilton (Hagerstown)	Democratic	Mar 4, 1869 – Mar 3, 1875	Election year unknown. Retired to run for governor.	15	43rd	15	Election year unknown. [data missing]	Mar 4, 1873 – Mar 3, 1879	Democratic	George R. Dennis (Kingston)	16
18	William Whyte (Baltimore)	Democratic	Mar 4, 1875 – Mar 3, 1881	Elected in 1874. Retired.	16	44th	15	Election year unknown. [data missing]	Mar 4, 1873 – Mar 3, 1879	Democratic	George R. Dennis (Kingston)	16
18	William Whyte (Baltimore)	Democratic	Mar 4, 1875 – Mar 3, 1881	Elected in 1874. Retired.	16	45th	15	Election year unknown. [data missing]	Mar 4, 1873 – Mar 3, 1879	Democratic	George R. Dennis (Kingston)	16
18	William Whyte (Baltimore)	Democratic	Mar 4, 1875 – Mar 3, 1881	Elected in 1874. Retired.	16	46th	16	Elected in 1878. [data missing]	Mar 4, 1879 – Mar 3, 1885	Democratic	James Black Groome (Elkton)	17
19	Arthur P. Gorman (Laurel)	Democratic	Mar 4, 1881 – Mar 3, 1899	Elected in 1880.	17	47th	16	Elected in 1878. [data missing]	Mar 4, 1879 – Mar 3, 1885	Democratic	James Black Groome (Elkton)	17
19	Arthur P. Gorman (Laurel)	Democratic	Mar 4, 1881 – Mar 3, 1899	Elected in 1880.	17	48th	16	Elected in 1878. [data missing]	Mar 4, 1879 – Mar 3, 1885	Democratic	James Black Groome (Elkton)	17
19	Arthur P. Gorman (Laurel)	Democratic	Mar 4, 1881 – Mar 3, 1899	Elected in 1880.	17	49th	17	Elected in 1884. Re-elected in 1890. Died.	Mar 4, 1885 – Feb 24, 1891	Democratic	Ephraim Wilson (Snow Hill)	18
19	Arthur P. Gorman (Laurel)	Democratic	Mar 4, 1881 – Mar 3, 1899	Re-elected in 1886.	18	50th	17	Elected in 1884. Re-elected in 1890. Died.	Mar 4, 1885 – Feb 24, 1891	Democratic	Ephraim Wilson (Snow Hill)	18
19	Arthur P. Gorman (Laurel)	Democratic	Mar 4, 1881 – Mar 3, 1899	Re-elected in 1886.	18	51st	17	Elected in 1884. Re-elected in 1890. Died.	Mar 4, 1885 – Feb 24, 1891	Democratic	Ephraim Wilson (Snow Hill)	18
19	Arthur P. Gorman (Laurel)	Democratic	Mar 4, 1881 – Mar 3, 1899	Re-elected in 1886.	18	51st	17		Feb 24, 1891 – Nov 19, 1891	Vacant		
19	Arthur P. Gorman (Laurel)	Democratic	Mar 4, 1881 – Mar 3, 1899	Re-elected in 1886.	18	52nd	18		Feb 24, 1891 – Nov 19, 1891	Vacant		
19	Arthur P. Gorman (Laurel)	Democratic	Mar 4, 1881 – Mar 3, 1899	Re-elected in 1886.	18	52nd	18	Appointed to continue Wilson's term. Elected in 1892 to finish Wilson's term. Unknown if retired or lost re-election.	Nov 19, 1891 – Mar 3, 1897	Democratic	Charles H. Gibson (Easton)	19
19	Arthur P. Gorman (Laurel)	Democratic	Mar 4, 1881 – Mar 3, 1899	Elected in 1892. Lost re-election.	19	53rd	18	Appointed to continue Wilson's term. Elected in 1892 to finish Wilson's term. Unknown if retired or lost re-election.	Nov 19, 1891 – Mar 3, 1897	Democratic	Charles H. Gibson (Easton)	19
19	Arthur P. Gorman (Laurel)	Democratic	Mar 4, 1881 – Mar 3, 1899	Elected in 1892. Lost re-election.	19	54th	18	Appointed to continue Wilson's term. Elected in 1892 to finish Wilson's term. Unknown if retired or lost re-election.	Nov 19, 1891 – Mar 3, 1897	Democratic	Charles H. Gibson (Easton)	19
19	Arthur P. Gorman (Laurel)	Democratic	Mar 4, 1881 – Mar 3, 1899	Elected in 1892. Lost re-election.	19	55th	19	Elected in 1896. Retired.	Mar 4, 1897 – Mar 3, 1903	Republican	George L. Wellington (Cumberland)	20
20	Louis E. McComas (Williamsport)	Republican	Mar 4, 1899 – Mar 3, 1905	Elected in 1898. Retired to become judge of the U.S. Court of Appeals.	20	56th	19	Elected in 1896. Retired.	Mar 4, 1897 – Mar 3, 1903	Republican	George L. Wellington (Cumberland)	20
20	Louis E. McComas (Williamsport)	Republican	Mar 4, 1899 – Mar 3, 1905	Elected in 1898. Retired to become judge of the U.S. Court of Appeals.	20	57th	19	Elected in 1896. Retired.	Mar 4, 1897 – Mar 3, 1903	Republican	George L. Wellington (Cumberland)	20
20	Louis E. McComas (Williamsport)	Republican	Mar 4, 1899 – Mar 3, 1905	Elected in 1898. Retired to become judge of the U.S. Court of Appeals.	20	58th	20	Elected in 1902. Died.	Mar 4, 1903 – Jun 4, 1906	Democratic	Arthur P. Gorman (Laurel)	21
21	Isidor Rayner (Baltimore)	Democratic	Mar 4, 1905 – Nov 25, 1912	Elected in 1904.	21	59th	20	Elected in 1902. Died.	Mar 4, 1903 – Jun 4, 1906	Democratic	Arthur P. Gorman (Laurel)	21
21	Isidor Rayner (Baltimore)	Democratic	Mar 4, 1905 – Nov 25, 1912	Elected in 1904.	21	59th	20		Jun 4, 1906 – Jun 8, 1906	Vacant		
21	Isidor Rayner (Baltimore)	Democratic	Mar 4, 1905 – Nov 25, 1912	Elected in 1904.	21	59th	20	Appointed to continue Gorman's term. Elected in 1908 to finish Gorman's term. Died.	Jun 8, 1906 – Mar 17, 1908	Democratic	William Whyte (Baltimore)	22
21	Isidor Rayner (Baltimore)	Democratic	Mar 4, 1905 – Nov 25, 1912	Elected in 1904.	21	60th	20	Appointed to continue Gorman's term. Elected in 1908 to finish Gorman's term. Died.	Jun 8, 1906 – Mar 17, 1908	Democratic	William Whyte (Baltimore)	22
21	Isidor Rayner (Baltimore)	Democratic	Mar 4, 1905 – Nov 25, 1912	Elected in 1904.	21	60th	20		Mar 17, 1908 – Mar 25, 1908	Vacant		
21	Isidor Rayner (Baltimore)	Democratic	Mar 4, 1905 – Nov 25, 1912	Elected in 1904.	21	60th	20	Elected to finish Gorman's term, having already been elected to the next term.	Mar 25, 1908 – Mar 3, 1921	Democratic	John Walter Smith (Snow Hill)	23
21	Isidor Rayner (Baltimore)	Democratic	Mar 4, 1905 – Nov 25, 1912	Elected in 1904.	21	61st	21	Elected in 1908.	Mar 25, 1908 – Mar 3, 1921	Democratic	John Walter Smith (Snow Hill)	23
21	Isidor Rayner (Baltimore)	Democratic	Mar 4, 1905 – Nov 25, 1912	Re-elected in 1910. Died.	22	62nd	21	Elected in 1908.	Mar 25, 1908 – Mar 3, 1921	Democratic	John Walter Smith (Snow Hill)	23
Vacant			Nov 25, 1912 – Nov 29, 1912		22	62nd	21	Elected in 1908.	Mar 25, 1908 – Mar 3, 1921	Democratic	John Walter Smith (Snow Hill)	23
22	William P. Jackson (Salisbury)	Republican	Nov 29, 1912 – Jan 28, 1914	Appointed to continue Rayner's term. Retired when successor elected.	22	62nd	21	Elected in 1908.	Mar 25, 1908 – Mar 3, 1921	Democratic	John Walter Smith (Snow Hill)	23
22	William P. Jackson (Salisbury)	Republican	Nov 29, 1912 – Jan 28, 1914	Appointed to continue Rayner's term. Retired when successor elected.	22	63rd	21	Elected in 1908.	Mar 25, 1908 – Mar 3, 1921	Democratic	John Walter Smith (Snow Hill)	23
23	Blair Lee (Silver Spring)	Democratic	Jan 28, 1914 – Mar 3, 1917	Elected in 1913 to finish Rayner's term. Lost re-election.	22	63rd	21	Elected in 1908.	Mar 25, 1908 – Mar 3, 1921	Democratic	John Walter Smith (Snow Hill)	23
23	Blair Lee (Silver Spring)	Democratic	Jan 28, 1914 – Mar 3, 1917	Elected in 1913 to finish Rayner's term. Lost re-election.	22	64th	22	Re-elected in 1914. Lost re-election.	Mar 25, 1908 – Mar 3, 1921	Democratic	John Walter Smith (Snow Hill)	23
24	Joseph I. France (Port Deposit)	Republican	Mar 4, 1917 – Mar 3, 1923	Elected in 1916. Lost re-election.	23	65th	22	Re-elected in 1914. Lost re-election.	Mar 25, 1908 – Mar 3, 1921	Democratic	John Walter Smith (Snow Hill)	23
24	Joseph I. France (Port Deposit)	Republican	Mar 4, 1917 – Mar 3, 1923	Elected in 1916. Lost re-election.	23	66th	22	Re-elected in 1914. Lost re-election.	Mar 25, 1908 – Mar 3, 1921	Democratic	John Walter Smith (Snow Hill)	23
24	Joseph I. France (Port Deposit)	Republican	Mar 4, 1917 – Mar 3, 1923	Elected in 1916. Lost re-election.	23	67th	23	Elected in 1920. Lost re-election.	Mar 4, 1921 – Mar 3, 1927	Republican	Ovington Weller (Baltimore)	24
25	William Cabell Bruce (Baltimore)	Democratic	Mar 4, 1923 – Mar 3, 1929	Elected in 1922. Lost re-election.	24	68th	23	Elected in 1920. Lost re-election.	Mar 4, 1921 – Mar 3, 1927	Republican	Ovington Weller (Baltimore)	24
25	William Cabell Bruce (Baltimore)	Democratic	Mar 4, 1923 – Mar 3, 1929	Elected in 1922. Lost re-election.	24	69th	23	Elected in 1920. Lost re-election.	Mar 4, 1921 – Mar 3, 1927	Republican	Ovington Weller (Baltimore)	24
25	William Cabell Bruce (Baltimore)	Democratic	Mar 4, 1923 – Mar 3, 1929	Elected in 1922. Lost re-election.	24	70th	24	Elected in 1926.	Mar 4, 1927 – Jan 3, 1951	Democratic	Millard Tydings (Havre de Grace)	25
26	Phillips Lee Goldsborough (Baltimore)	Republican	Mar 4, 1929 – Jan 3, 1935	Elected in 1928. Retired to run for governor.	25	71st	24	Elected in 1926.	Mar 4, 1927 – Jan 3, 1951	Democratic	Millard Tydings (Havre de Grace)	25
26	Phillips Lee Goldsborough (Baltimore)	Republican	Mar 4, 1929 – Jan 3, 1935	Elected in 1928. Retired to run for governor.	25	72nd	24	Elected in 1926.	Mar 4, 1927 – Jan 3, 1951	Democratic	Millard Tydings (Havre de Grace)	25
26	Phillips Lee Goldsborough (Baltimore)	Republican	Mar 4, 1929 – Jan 3, 1935	Elected in 1928. Retired to run for governor.	25	73rd	25	Re-elected in 1932.	Mar 4, 1927 – Jan 3, 1951	Democratic	Millard Tydings (Havre de Grace)	25
27	George L. P. Radcliffe (Baltimore)	Democratic	Jan 3, 1935 – Jan 3, 1947	Elected in 1934.	26	74th	25	Re-elected in 1932.	Mar 4, 1927 – Jan 3, 1951	Democratic	Millard Tydings (Havre de Grace)	25
27	George L. P. Radcliffe (Baltimore)	Democratic	Jan 3, 1935 – Jan 3, 1947	Elected in 1934.	26	75th	25	Re-elected in 1932.	Mar 4, 1927 – Jan 3, 1951	Democratic	Millard Tydings (Havre de Grace)	25
27	George L. P. Radcliffe (Baltimore)	Democratic	Jan 3, 1935 – Jan 3, 1947	Elected in 1934.	26	76th	26	Re-elected in 1938.	Mar 4, 1927 – Jan 3, 1951	Democratic	Millard Tydings (Havre de Grace)	25
27	George L. P. Radcliffe (Baltimore)	Democratic	Jan 3, 1935 – Jan 3, 1947	Re-elected in 1940. Lost renomination.	27	77th	26	Re-elected in 1938.	Mar 4, 1927 – Jan 3, 1951	Democratic	Millard Tydings (Havre de Grace)	25
27	George L. P. Radcliffe (Baltimore)	Democratic	Jan 3, 1935 – Jan 3, 1947	Re-elected in 1940. Lost renomination.	27	78th	26	Re-elected in 1938.	Mar 4, 1927 – Jan 3, 1951	Democratic	Millard Tydings (Havre de Grace)	25
27	George L. P. Radcliffe (Baltimore)	Democratic	Jan 3, 1935 – Jan 3, 1947	Re-elected in 1940. Lost renomination.	27	79th	27	Re-elected in 1944. Lost re-election.	Mar 4, 1927 – Jan 3, 1951	Democratic	Millard Tydings (Havre de Grace)	25
28	Herbert O'Conor (Baltimore)	Democratic	Jan 3, 1947 – Jan 3, 1953	Elected in 1946. Retired.	28	80th	27	Re-elected in 1944. Lost re-election.	Mar 4, 1927 – Jan 3, 1951	Democratic	Millard Tydings (Havre de Grace)	25
28	Herbert O'Conor (Baltimore)	Democratic	Jan 3, 1947 – Jan 3, 1953	Elected in 1946. Retired.	28	81st	27	Re-elected in 1944. Lost re-election.	Mar 4, 1927 – Jan 3, 1951	Democratic	Millard Tydings (Havre de Grace)	25
28	Herbert O'Conor (Baltimore)	Democratic	Jan 3, 1947 – Jan 3, 1953	Elected in 1946. Retired.	28	82nd	28	Elected in 1950.	Jan 3, 1951 – Jan 3, 1963	Republican	John Marshall Butler (Baltimore)	26
29	J. Glenn Beall (Frostburg)	Republican	Jan 3, 1953 – Jan 3, 1965	Elected in 1952.	29	83rd	28	Elected in 1950.	Jan 3, 1951 – Jan 3, 1963	Republican	John Marshall Butler (Baltimore)	26
29	J. Glenn Beall (Frostburg)	Republican	Jan 3, 1953 – Jan 3, 1965	Elected in 1952.	29	84th	28	Elected in 1950.	Jan 3, 1951 – Jan 3, 1963	Republican	John Marshall Butler (Baltimore)	26
29	J. Glenn Beall (Frostburg)	Republican	Jan 3, 1953 – Jan 3, 1965	Elected in 1952.	29	85th	29	Re-elected in 1956. Retired.	Jan 3, 1951 – Jan 3, 1963	Republican	John Marshall Butler (Baltimore)	26
29	J. Glenn Beall (Frostburg)	Republican	Jan 3, 1953 – Jan 3, 1965	Re-elected in 1958. Lost re-election.	30	86th	29	Re-elected in 1956. Retired.	Jan 3, 1951 – Jan 3, 1963	Republican	John Marshall Butler (Baltimore)	26
29	J. Glenn Beall (Frostburg)	Republican	Jan 3, 1953 – Jan 3, 1965	Re-elected in 1958. Lost re-election.	30	87th	29	Re-elected in 1956. Retired.	Jan 3, 1951 – Jan 3, 1963	Republican	John Marshall Butler (Baltimore)	26
29	J. Glenn Beall (Frostburg)	Republican	Jan 3, 1953 – Jan 3, 1965	Re-elected in 1958. Lost re-election.	30	88th	30	Elected in 1962. Lost re-election.	Jan 3, 1963 – Jan 3, 1969	Democratic	Daniel Brewster (Towson)	27
30	Joseph Tydings (Havre de Grace)	Democratic	Jan 3, 1965 – Jan 3, 1971	Elected in 1964. Lost re-election.	31	89th	30	Elected in 1962. Lost re-election.	Jan 3, 1963 – Jan 3, 1969	Democratic	Daniel Brewster (Towson)	27
30	Joseph Tydings (Havre de Grace)	Democratic	Jan 3, 1965 – Jan 3, 1971	Elected in 1964. Lost re-election.	31	90th	30	Elected in 1962. Lost re-election.	Jan 3, 1963 – Jan 3, 1969	Democratic	Daniel Brewster (Towson)	27
30	Joseph Tydings (Havre de Grace)	Democratic	Jan 3, 1965 – Jan 3, 1971	Elected in 1964. Lost re-election.	31	91st	31	Elected in 1968.	Jan 3, 1969 – Jan 3, 1987	Republican	Charles Mathias (Frederick)	28
31	J. Glenn Beall Jr. (Frostburg)	Republican	Jan 3, 1971 – Jan 3, 1977	Elected in 1970. Lost re-election.	32	92nd	31	Elected in 1968.	Jan 3, 1969 – Jan 3, 1987	Republican	Charles Mathias (Frederick)	28
31	J. Glenn Beall Jr. (Frostburg)	Republican	Jan 3, 1971 – Jan 3, 1977	Elected in 1970. Lost re-election.	32	93rd	31	Elected in 1968.	Jan 3, 1969 – Jan 3, 1987	Republican	Charles Mathias (Frederick)	28
31	J. Glenn Beall Jr. (Frostburg)	Republican	Jan 3, 1971 – Jan 3, 1977	Elected in 1970. Lost re-election.	32	94th	32	Re-elected in 1974.	Jan 3, 1969 – Jan 3, 1987	Republican	Charles Mathias (Frederick)	28
32	Paul Sarbanes (Baltimore)	Democratic	Jan 3, 1977 – Jan 3, 2007	Elected in 1976.	33	95th	32	Re-elected in 1974.	Jan 3, 1969 – Jan 3, 1987	Republican	Charles Mathias (Frederick)	28
32	Paul Sarbanes (Baltimore)	Democratic	Jan 3, 1977 – Jan 3, 2007	Elected in 1976.	33	96th	32	Re-elected in 1974.	Jan 3, 1969 – Jan 3, 1987	Republican	Charles Mathias (Frederick)	28
32	Paul Sarbanes (Baltimore)	Democratic	Jan 3, 1977 – Jan 3, 2007	Elected in 1976.	33	97th	33	Re-elected in 1980. Retired.	Jan 3, 1969 – Jan 3, 1987	Republican	Charles Mathias (Frederick)	28
32	Paul Sarbanes (Baltimore)	Democratic	Jan 3, 1977 – Jan 3, 2007	Re-elected in 1982.	34	98th	33	Re-elected in 1980. Retired.	Jan 3, 1969 – Jan 3, 1987	Republican	Charles Mathias (Frederick)	28
32	Paul Sarbanes (Baltimore)	Democratic	Jan 3, 1977 – Jan 3, 2007	Re-elected in 1982.	34	99th	33	Re-elected in 1980. Retired.	Jan 3, 1969 – Jan 3, 1987	Republican	Charles Mathias (Frederick)	28
32	Paul Sarbanes (Baltimore)	Democratic	Jan 3, 1977 – Jan 3, 2007	Re-elected in 1982.	34	100th	34	Elected in 1986.	Jan 3, 1987 – Jan 3, 2017	Democratic	Barbara Mikulski (Baltimore)	29
32	Paul Sarbanes (Baltimore)	Democratic	Jan 3, 1977 – Jan 3, 2007	Re-elected in 1988.	35	101st	34	Elected in 1986.	Jan 3, 1987 – Jan 3, 2017	Democratic	Barbara Mikulski (Baltimore)	29
32	Paul Sarbanes (Baltimore)	Democratic	Jan 3, 1977 – Jan 3, 2007	Re-elected in 1988.	35	102nd	34	Elected in 1986.	Jan 3, 1987 – Jan 3, 2017	Democratic	Barbara Mikulski (Baltimore)	29
32	Paul Sarbanes (Baltimore)	Democratic	Jan 3, 1977 – Jan 3, 2007	Re-elected in 1988.	35	103rd	35	Re-elected in 1992.	Jan 3, 1987 – Jan 3, 2017	Democratic	Barbara Mikulski (Baltimore)	29
32	Paul Sarbanes (Baltimore)	Democratic	Jan 3, 1977 – Jan 3, 2007	Re-elected in 1994.	36	104th	35	Re-elected in 1992.	Jan 3, 1987 – Jan 3, 2017	Democratic	Barbara Mikulski (Baltimore)	29
32	Paul Sarbanes (Baltimore)	Democratic	Jan 3, 1977 – Jan 3, 2007	Re-elected in 1994.	36	105th	35	Re-elected in 1992.	Jan 3, 1987 – Jan 3, 2017	Democratic	Barbara Mikulski (Baltimore)	29
32	Paul Sarbanes (Baltimore)	Democratic	Jan 3, 1977 – Jan 3, 2007	Re-elected in 1994.	36	106th	36	Re-elected in 1998.	Jan 3, 1987 – Jan 3, 2017	Democratic	Barbara Mikulski (Baltimore)	29
32	Paul Sarbanes (Baltimore)	Democratic	Jan 3, 1977 – Jan 3, 2007	Re-elected in 2000. Retired.	37	107th	36	Re-elected in 1998.	Jan 3, 1987 – Jan 3, 2017	Democratic	Barbara Mikulski (Baltimore)	29
32	Paul Sarbanes (Baltimore)	Democratic	Jan 3, 1977 – Jan 3, 2007	Re-elected in 2000. Retired.	37	108th	36	Re-elected in 1998.	Jan 3, 1987 – Jan 3, 2017	Democratic	Barbara Mikulski (Baltimore)	29
32	Paul Sarbanes (Baltimore)	Democratic	Jan 3, 1977 – Jan 3, 2007	Re-elected in 2000. Retired.	37	109th	37	Re-elected in 2004.	Jan 3, 1987 – Jan 3, 2017	Democratic	Barbara Mikulski (Baltimore)	29
33	Ben Cardin (Baltimore)	Democratic	Jan 3, 2007 – Jan 3, 2025	Elected in 2006.	38	110th	37	Re-elected in 2004.	Jan 3, 1987 – Jan 3, 2017	Democratic	Barbara Mikulski (Baltimore)	29
33	Ben Cardin (Baltimore)	Democratic	Jan 3, 2007 – Jan 3, 2025	Elected in 2006.	38	111th	37	Re-elected in 2004.	Jan 3, 1987 – Jan 3, 2017	Democratic	Barbara Mikulski (Baltimore)	29
33	Ben Cardin (Baltimore)	Democratic	Jan 3, 2007 – Jan 3, 2025	Elected in 2006.	38	112th	38	Re-elected in 2010. Retired.	Jan 3, 1987 – Jan 3, 2017	Democratic	Barbara Mikulski (Baltimore)	29
33	Ben Cardin (Baltimore)	Democratic	Jan 3, 2007 – Jan 3, 2025	Re-elected in 2012.	39	113th	38	Re-elected in 2010. Retired.	Jan 3, 1987 – Jan 3, 2017	Democratic	Barbara Mikulski (Baltimore)	29
33	Ben Cardin (Baltimore)	Democratic	Jan 3, 2007 – Jan 3, 2025	Re-elected in 2012.	39	114th	38	Re-elected in 2010. Retired.	Jan 3, 1987 – Jan 3, 2017	Democratic	Barbara Mikulski (Baltimore)	29
33	Ben Cardin (Baltimore)	Democratic	Jan 3, 2007 – Jan 3, 2025	Re-elected in 2012.	39	115th	39	Elected in 2016.	Jan 3, 2017 – present	Democratic	Chris Van Hollen (Kensington)	30
33	Ben Cardin (Baltimore)	Democratic	Jan 3, 2007 – Jan 3, 2025	Re-elected in 2018. Retired.	40	116th	39	Elected in 2016.	Jan 3, 2017 – present	Democratic	Chris Van Hollen (Kensington)	30
33	Ben Cardin (Baltimore)	Democratic	Jan 3, 2007 – Jan 3, 2025	Re-elected in 2018. Retired.	40	117th	39	Elected in 2016.	Jan 3, 2017 – present	Democratic	Chris Van Hollen (Kensington)	30
33	Ben Cardin (Baltimore)	Democratic	Jan 3, 2007 – Jan 3, 2025	Re-elected in 2018. Retired.	40	118th	40	Re-elected in 2022.	Jan 3, 2017 – present	Democratic	Chris Van Hollen (Kensington)	30
34	Angela Alsobrooks (Upper Marlboro)	Democratic	Jan 3, 2025 – present	Elected in 2024.	41	119th	40	Re-elected in 2022.	Jan 3, 2017 – present	Democratic	Chris Van Hollen (Kensington)	30
34	Angela Alsobrooks (Upper Marlboro)	Democratic	Jan 3, 2025 – present	Elected in 2024.	41	120th	40	Re-elected in 2022.	Jan 3, 2017 – present	Democratic	Chris Van Hollen (Kensington)	30
34	Angela Alsobrooks (Upper Marlboro)	Democratic	Jan 3, 2025 – present	Elected in 2024.	41	121st	41	To be determined in the 2028 election.				
To be determined in the 2030 election.					42	122nd	41	To be determined in the 2028 election.				

== See also ==
- Elections in Maryland
- List of United States representatives from Maryland
- Maryland's congressional delegations
