= Joseph Tydings =

American politician (1928–2018)

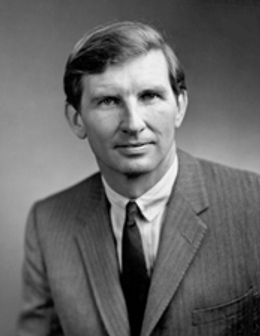

United States Senator from Maryland
- In office January 3, 1965 – January 3, 1971
- Preceded by: J. Glenn Beall
- Succeeded by: J. Glenn Beall Jr.

United States Attorney for the District of Maryland
- In office 1961 – November 21, 1963
- Preceded by: Leon H. A. Pierson
- Succeeded by: Robert H. Kernon

Member of the Maryland House of Delegates from the Harford County district
- In office 1955–1961 Serving with Thomas J. Hatem, W. Dale Hess, Charles M. Moore, Morton H. Getz
- Succeeded by: W. Lester Davis

Personal details
- Born: Joseph Davies Cheesborough; May 4, 1928 Asheville, North Carolina, U.S.
- Died: October 8, 2018 (aged 90) Washington, D.C., U.S.
- Party: Democratic
- Spouse(s): Virginia Reynolds Campbell (m. 1955; div. 1974) Terry Huntingdon (m. 1975, divorced)
- Relations: Millard Tydings (stepfather)
- Children: 5, including Alexandra
- Education: University of Maryland, College Park; University of Maryland, Baltimore

Military service
- Branch/service: United States Army
- Years of service: 1946-1948
- Rank: Corporal
- Unit: 6th Constabulary Regiment
- Battles/wars: Occupation of Germany

Joseph Davies Tydings (né Cheesborough; May 4, 1928 – October 8, 2018) was an American lawyer and politician from Maryland. A member of the Democratic Party, he was most notable for his service as a member of the United States Senate for only a single term from 1965 to 1971.

Tydings also argued Eisenstadt v. Baird, in which the Supreme Court of the United States legalized birth control for single persons in 1972. The decision has been described as among the most influential Supreme Court decisions of the 20th century.

== Early life, education, and military service ==
Tydings was born in Asheville, North Carolina, the son of Eleanor Davies and Thomas Patton Cheesborough, who divorced in 1935. He was raised in Aberdeen, Maryland, and was adopted by his stepfather, Millard Tydings. His maternal grandfather was Joseph E. Davies, who served as U.S. Ambassador to Belgium, Luxembourg, and the Soviet Union, and whose second wife was the cereal heiress Marjorie Merriweather Post. Tydings went on to graduate from the McDonogh School in 1946.

=== Military service ===
He served in the 6th Constabulary Regiment from 1946 to 1948 during the U.S. Army's post-World War II occupation of Germany and attained the rank of corporal.

=== University of Maryland ===
Following his military service, Tydings attended the University of Maryland, College Park, where he played football and Lacrosse. He graduated in 1951. While attending college, Tydings became a brother of Alpha Phi Omega, and he graduated from the University of Maryland School of Law of the University of Maryland, Baltimore in 1953. He was president of the Maryland Young Democrats in the 1950s.

== Legal career ==
Tydings had been admitted to the bar in 1952, before he completed his law degree, and he began to practice soon afterwards. In 1954 he was a successful Democratic candidate for the Maryland House of Delegates from Harford County, Maryland. He served as a Delegate from 1955 to 1961, when he was appointed United States Attorney for Maryland by President John F. Kennedy, a close friend. As U.S. Attorney, Tydings brought many political corruption cases, including against Congressman Thomas Francis Johnson and state House of Delegates speaker A. Gordon Boone, both of whom were imprisoned. He also oversaw the prosecution of several people in the savings and loan business. In 1963, Tydings served as the United States representative at the Interpol Conference in Helsinki, Finland, and at the International Penal Conference in Bellagio. Lombardy, Italy.

== Election to the Senate ==
In the 1964 elections, Tydings was frequently mentioned as a potential candidate for the United States Senate seat of Republican J. Glenn Beall. While initially hesitant, Tydings resigned as U.S. Attorney on November 21, 1963, to test his political support across the state. On January 14, 1964, Tydings officially declared his candidacy, stating he was challenging the "old guard" of the Maryland Democratic Party political machine. He also said he would work to bring a "new era of leadership into Maryland".

During the primary election in May 1964, Tydings faced Maryland Comptroller Louis L. Goldstein, who had won the endorsement of both J. Millard Tawes, Governor of Maryland, and Daniel Brewster, the other U.S. Senator from Maryland. Despite Goldstein's support from party leaders, Tydings trounced him by a nearly a two-to-one margin.

Tydings faced Beall in the general election and the results gave Tydings nearly 63% of 1,081,042 votes cast. His large margin of victory was due at least in part to the landslide win by fellow Democrat Lyndon B. Johnson for President in the same election, which likely increased voter turnout.

== United States Senator ==
Upon his election, Tydings began to lay out his legislative agenda for his upcoming term, which included water conservation, pollution and air purity, and public transport. He played a crucial role in the enactment of the federal law governing multidistrict litigation. He also expressed interest in serving on the United States Senate Committee on the District of Columbia. Tydings won a place on the DC committee, and was appointed chairman in 1969.

Leading up to the elections of 1970, Tydings faced criticism from both parties for his actions as senator. In July 1970, syndicated columnist Marquis Childs noted that Tydings' problems on the left stemmed from his support of a crime bill for the Washington, D.C., which was perceived as repressive against African Americans. There was also criticism directed at the bill for writing into law the practices of preventive detention and no-knock warrants.

Tydings voted in favor of the Voting Rights Act of 1965, the Civil Rights Act of 1968, and the confirmation of Thurgood Marshall to the U.S. Supreme Court. Tydings opposed President Richard Nixon's nominations of Clement Haynsworth and G. Harrold Carswell to the Supreme Court, earning him the enmity of Nixon.

Known for his love of horses, Tydings was the Senate sponsor of the Horse Protection Act of 1970, which prohibited certain inhumane practices against horses.

Tydings' difficulties with the right stemmed from his sponsorship of the Firearms Registration and Licensing Act, which would have required the registration of firearms. An avid hunter himself, his efforts agitated the gun lobby and the National Rifle Association. One Maryland activist group, Citizens Against Tydings, was formed solely because of Tydings' gun registration platform. Further complicating his relations with the right were the efforts by the American Security Council Foundation, which graded him as a "zero" on national security issues and spent over $150,000 to campaign against his bid for re-election.

== 1970 election ==
In the Democratic primary, Tydings was challenged by perennial candidate and Dixiecrat George P. Mahoney and two others. After a divisive campaign, Tydings beat Mahoney by 53% to 37%.

For the general election, Tydings' opponent was freshman Congressman John Glenn Beall Jr. from Western Maryland, the son of James Glenn Beall, whom Tydings had defeated in 1964. Beall's campaign strategy "leaned heavily on his affable, noncontroversial personality" and avoided turning the campaign negative. As a result of Tydings' unpopularity and Beall's campaign strategy, Tydings was defeated 51% to 48%.

In a review of the election, The Washington Post noted one of Tydings' major problems was identifying with his constituents. Despite the 3–1 advantage of registered Democrats versus Republicans in the state, Tydings had been labeled as an "ultraliberal" by many Marylanders, and Vice President Spiro Agnew, formerly the Governor of Maryland, had called Tydings "radical" while campaigning for Beall. Tydings was also wealthy, and was seen as having an "aloof" disposition.

== Return to politics ==
Tydings resumed his legal career after he lost his Senate seat, entering into practice with a Washington law firm that included Giant Food President Joseph Danzansky. After several years out of politics, he began traveling the state in 1975 to gauge his chances for winning a rematch versus Beall, who was coming up for re-election in 1976. On January 10, 1976, Tydings announced his candidacy for his former senate seat, which he argued was taken unfairly in 1970 due to an undisclosed $180,000 gift to the Beall campaign.

In the primary, Tydings faced a strong challenge from Congressman Paul Sarbanes, who had entered the race several months earlier. This head start gave Sarbanes a considerable organizational and monetary advantage, and he had already secured influential endorsements. To fend off Sarbanes, Tydings hoped his name recognition and charisma on television would compensate for Sarbanes' other advantages. He also worked to relabel himself as more fiscally conservative than Sarbanes, since both candidates were seen as liberal.

For the primary election, Tydings needed a large margin of victory from precincts in the Washington, D.C., suburbs of Prince George's and Montgomery Counties, where he was most popular. Despite Tydings winning both counties, Sarbanes performed well in the rest of the state and defeated him by over 100,000 votes, 61% to 39%. Sarbanes had outspent Tydings two-to-one during the campaign. After defeating Tydings, Sarbanes won the general election by a landslide and served as senator until 2007.

== Post-Senate career ==
Following his electoral defeat, Tydings returned to his law career at Danzansky's firm. In 1971, he gave oral argument on behalf of Bill Baird in the Supreme Court case Eisenstadt v. Baird in November 1971; in its decision the next year, the Court held that a Massachusetts state law barring the use of birth control for single persons was unconstitutional. The Eisenstadt decision has been described as among the most influential Supreme Court decisions of the 20th century.

Tydings also worked as a partner in the law firm of Finley, Kumble, Wagner, Heine, Underberg, Manley, Myerson & Casey, which collapsed in 1987. Later, Tydings worked at Anderson Kill Olick & Oshinsky from 1988 until his departure with Jerold Oshinsky in 1996 to join Dickstein Shapiro in Washington, D.C.

In academics, Tydings was a member of the Board of Regents of the University of Maryland from 1974 to 1984, serving as chairman from 1982 to 1984; it became University of Maryland, College Park in 1988. In 1977, Tydings called for the Board of Regents of the University of Maryland to divestinvestment from South Africa. He later served as a member of Board of Regents of the University System of Maryland from 2000 to 2005. In September 2008, he was appointed by Maryland Governor Martin O'Malley to the board of the University of Maryland Medical System. As of 2016, he resided in Harford County, Maryland.

In the last two decades of his life, Tydings was an attorney at the firm Blank Rome. Tydings was a member of the ReFormers Caucus of Issue One.

Joseph Tydings died in Washington, D.C., from cancer, on October 8, 2018, at the age of 90.

== Personal life ==
Tydings was married and divorced four times. He first married Virginia Reynolds Campbell of Lewes, Delaware, in 1955; they had four children. They divorced in 1974. In 1975, Tydings then married Terry Lynn Huntingdon of Mount Shasta, California, with whom he had one child, actress Alexandra Tydings. Tydings and Huntingdon subsequently divorced. He later married and divorced two times more.

Marjorie Merriweather Post was the second wife of Tydings' maternal grandfather Joseph E. Davies and it came to pass that Davies' crest was displayed at Post's Mar-a-Lago estate in Palm Beach, Florida. The heraldry had one word placed above it, "Integritas" (Latin for integrity). When the estate came into the hands of Donald Trump and was converted into a private club, the future President modified the logo and replaced "Integritas" with "Trump". Tydings who as a boy had spent a good deal of time at the seaside home remarked about the irony...“My grandfather would be rolling over in his grave if he knew Trump was using his crest,” ... “I am sorry to say that banishing the concept of ‘integrity’ is a sad metaphor for the Trump presidency"...

U.S. Senate
Preceded by J. Glenn Beall	U.S. senator (Class 1) from Maryland; 1965–1971; Served alongside: Daniel Brewster, Charles Mathias	Succeeded by J. Glenn Beall Jr.
Party political offices
Preceded by Thomas D'Alesandro Jr.	Democratic nominee for United States Senator from Maryland (Class 1); 1964, 1970	Succeeded by Paul Sarbanes
