= Jack Pollack =

American politician (1899–1977)

James H. "Jack" Pollack (21 October 1899 – 14 March 1977) was an American Democratic politician known for criminal pursuits and interference in court system.

== Early life ==
Pollack was born in Baltimore, Maryland and lived in a home near the intersection of Wilson and Exeter Streets during his childhood. However, the death of his mother at age 13 and the death of his father at age 15 forced him to quit school and live on the streets. Pollack found his place in the streets of Baltimore through competitive boxing. Pollack travelled the country competing for $1,500 purses in lightweight title fights. At 175 pounds Pollack was a stout fighter who won acclaim for fighting men as much as 40 pounds heavier.

== Criminal career ==
Pollack also made a name for himself during prohibition as a whiskey-runner. From a residence on West Fayette Street, Pollack organized whiskey smuggling under the claimed profession of "chauffeur". From 1921 to 1926, Pollack was arrested 13 times on charges that ranged from assault to murder. Pollack was charged with the murder of Hugo Caplan in 1921 during the hijacking of a contraband whiskey truck. Two years later, Pollack was acquitted of the charges and the files disappeared from the State's Attorney's office in 1948. Pollack gained some local fame within from his prohibition activities.

== Political career ==
Pollack gained notoriety and political success during the 1930s with the creation of the Trenton Democratic Club. He used his ties with Baltimore politician William Curran to form a political base amongst area Democrats. Pollack saw major involvement in the Baltimore court system as a tool for political success. His relationships with jurists made him well known for payoffs, bribery, and corruption. In 1954, he beat a charge on obstruction of justice in which he pressured defendants in a series of corruption trials. Pollack was well respected despite some blatant criminal activity while in politics. He was appointed to the Maryland State Athletic Commission in 1933 by Governor Albert Ritchie.

== Death ==
Pollack remained active in politics until his death from cancer on 14 March 1977 at University Hospital in Baltimore, Maryland.
