= 1952 United States Senate election in Maryland =

- November 4, 1952
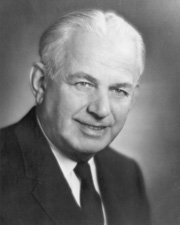

Nominee	James Glenn Beall	George P. Mahoney
Party	Republican	Democratic
Popular vote	449,823	406,370
Percentage	52.54%	47.46%
- County results Beall: 50–60% 60–70% Mahoney: 50–60%
U.S. senator before election
Herbert O'Conor
Democratic
Elected U.S. Senator
James Glenn Beall
Republican

The 1952 United States Senate election in Maryland was held on November 4, 1952.

Incumbent Democratic Senator Herbert O'Conor chose not to seek re-election for a second term. Republican U.S. Representative James Glenn Beall defeated Democrat George P. Mahoney to win the open seat. This was the first time since 1928 that a Republican was elected to the Class 1 Senate seat in Maryland.

== Democratic primary ==
=== Candidates ===
- Lansdale G. Sasscer, U.S. Representative from Upper Marlboro
- George P. Mahoney, paving contractor and candidate for governor in 1950
- Stephen B. Petticord

=== Results ===
1952 Democratic U.S. Senate primary
Party	Candidate	Votes	%
Democratic	George P. Mahoney	136,932	51.05%
Democratic	Lansdale G. Sasscer	122,679	45.74%
Democratic	Stephen Petticord	8,620	3.21%
Total votes		268,231	100.00%

== Republican primary ==
=== Candidates ===
- James Glenn Beall, U.S. Representative from Frostburg
- Royden Addison Blunt
- H. Grady Gore, lawyer and real estate investor
- Thomas Hankinson
- Herman L. Mills

=== Results ===
1952 Republican U.S. Senate primary
Party	Candidate	Votes	%
Republican	James Glenn Beall	54,045	52.85%
Republican	H. Grady Gore	32,804	32.08%
Republican	Royden Addison Blunt	7,298	7.14%
Republican	Herman L. Mills	5,466	5.35%
Republican	Thomas Hankinson	2,652	2.59%
Total votes		102,265	100.00%

== General election ==
=== Results ===
General election results
Party	Candidate	Votes	%	±%
Republican	James Glenn Beall	449,823	51.18%	▲2.78
Democratic	George P. Mahoney	406,370	48.82%	▼2.78
Total votes		856,193	100.00%	
Republican gain from Democratic				

=== Results by county ===
County	J. Glenn Beall Republican		George P. Mahoney Democratic		Margin		Total Votes Cast
County	#	%	#	%	#	%	Total Votes Cast
Allegany	20830	61.85%	12531	37.21%	8299	24.64%	33679
Anne Arundel	20359	56.38%	15649	43.34%	4710	13.04%	36110
Baltimore (City)	145827	44.45%	180378	54.98%	-34551	-10.53%	328102
Baltimore (County)	71543	56.26%	55476	43.62%	16067	12.63%	127166
Calvert	2541	51.47%	2356	47.72%	185	3.75%	4937
Caroline	3696	54.86%	3024	44.89%	672	9.97%	6737
Carroll	10764	66.11%	5474	33.62%	5290	32.49%	16281
Cecil	5700	49.00%	5895	50.68%	-195	-1.68%	11632
Charles	3757	50.15%	3683	49.16%	74	0.99%	7492
Dorchester	4994	50.83%	4808	48.94%	186	1.89%	9824
Frederick	14981	67.67%	7067	31.92%	7914	35.75%	22138
Garrett	4869	68.58%	2210	31.13%	2659	37.45%	7100
Harford	9064	54.31%	7575	45.39%	1489	8.92%	16690
Howard	4928	55.15%	3981	44.56%	947	10.60%	8935
Kent	3038	51.73%	2752	46.86%	286	4.87%	5873
Montgomery	44293	60.51%	28765	39.30%	15528	21.21%	73194
Prince George's	33103	52.91%	29365	46.94%	3738	5.97%	62562
Queen Anne's	2714	43.18%	3544	56.39%	-830	-13.21%	6285
St. Mary's	3537	45.89%	4122	53.48%	-585	-7.59%	7707
Somerset	3803	49.45%	3887	50.55%	-84	-1.09%	7690
Talbot	4832	59.02%	3326	40.63%	1506	18.40%	8187
Washington	18042	60.37%	11729	39.24%	6313	21.12%	29887
Wicomico	8461	59.35%	5763	40.43%	2698	18.93%	14255
Worcester	4147	57.69%	3010	41.87%	1137	15.82%	7189
Total	449823	52.33%	406370	47.27%	43453	5.05%	859652

==== Counties that flipped from Democratic to Republican ====
- Calvert
- Caroline
- Howard
- Kent
- Montgomery
- Prince George's
- Wicomico
- Worcester

==== Counties that flipped from Republican to Democratic ====
- Somerset

== See also ==
- 1952 United States Senate elections
- 1952 United States elections
