= Senator Weller =

Senator Weller may refer to:

- John B. Weller (1812–1875), U.S. Senator from California from 1852 to 1857
- Ovington Weller (1862–1927), U.S. Senator from Maryland from 1921 to 1927
