= 1914 United States Senate election in Maryland =

- November 2, 1914
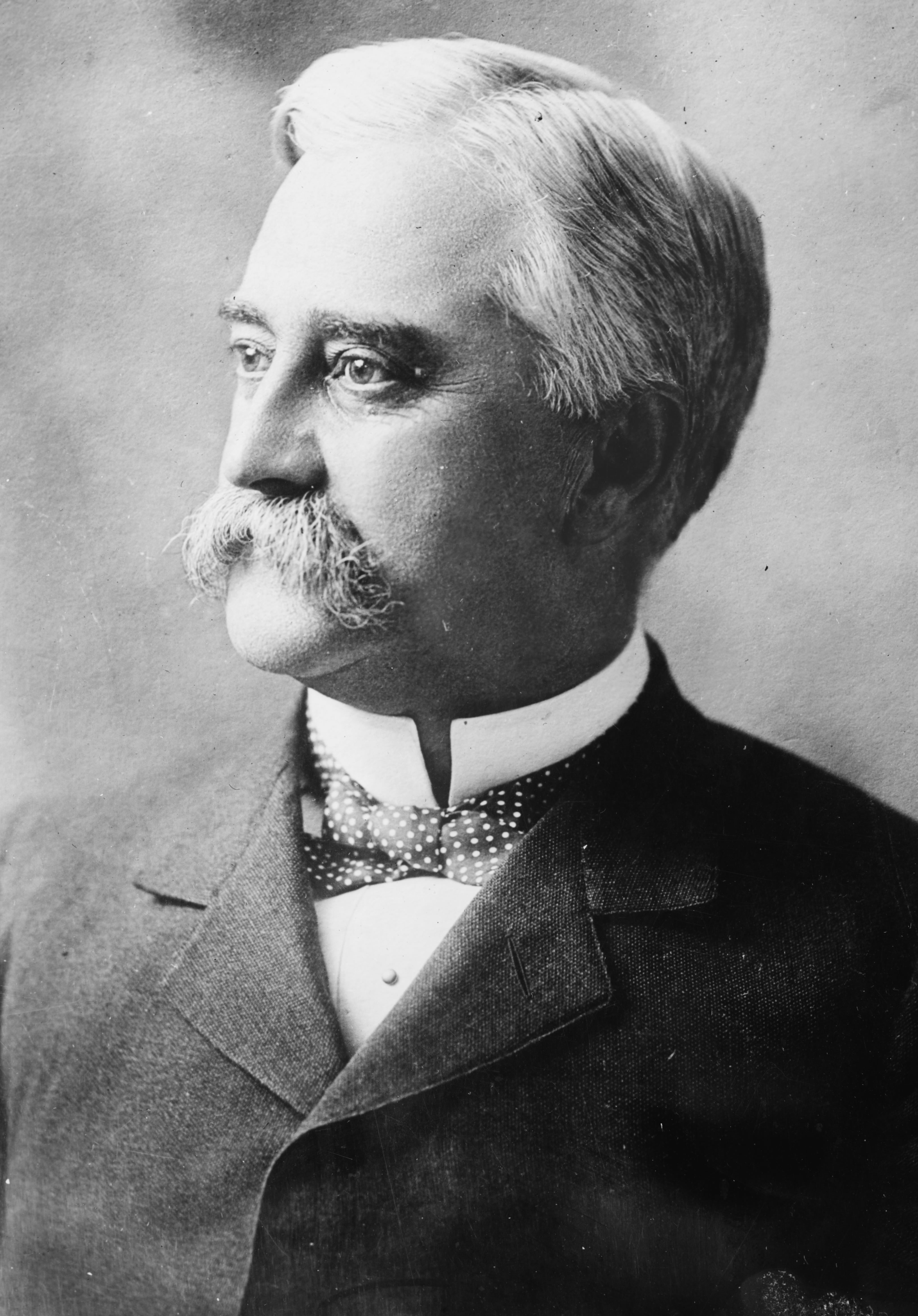

Nominee	John Walter Smith	Edward Carrington
Party	Democratic	Republican
Popular vote	110,204	94,864
Percentage	50.99%	43.89%
- County results Smith: 40–50% 50–60% Carrington: 40–50% 50–60% 60–70%
U.S. senator before election
John Walter Smith
Democratic
Elected U.S. Senator
John Walter Smith
Democratic

The 1914 United States Senate election in Maryland was held on November 2, 1914. Incumbent Democratic U.S. Senator John Walter Smith was re-elected to a second term in office over Republican Edward Carrington Jr.

This was the first regularly scheduled election held in Maryland following the passage of the Seventeenth Amendment to the United States Constitution, which required direct election of Senators. However, a special election had been held in 1913 for Maryland's other Senate seat under the Amendment's requirement.

== General election ==
=== Candidates ===
- Edward C. Carrington Jr. (Republican)
- Charles A. Develin (Socialist)
- Richard Henry Holme (Prohibition)
- V. Milton Reichard (Progressive)
- Robert W. Stevens (Labor)
- John Walter Smith, incumbent Senator since 1908 (Democratic)

=== Results ===
1914 U.S. Senate election in Maryland
Party	Candidate	Votes	%
Democratic	John Walter Smith (inc.)	110,204	50.99%
Republican	Edward C. Carrington, Jr.	94,864	43.89%
Progressive	V. Milton Reichard	3,697	1.71%
Socialist	Charles A. Develin	3,255	1.51%
Prohibition	Richard Henry Holme	3,144	1.46%
Labor	Robert W. Stevens	969	0.45%
Total votes		216,133	100.00%
Democratic hold			

=== Results by county ===
County	John Walter Smith Democratic		Edward C. Carrington Jr. Republican		V. Milton Reichard Progressive		Charles A. Develin Socialist		Other Other		Margin		Total Votes Cast
County	#	%	#	%	#	%	#	%	#	%	#	%	Total Votes Cast
Allegany	3772	38.01%	5233	52.73%	110	1.11%	529	5.33%	281	2.83%	-1461	-14.72%	9925
Anne Arundel	3371	51.51%	2935	44.85%	37	0.57%	96	1.47%	105	1.60%	436	6.66%	6544
Baltimore (City)	34167	40.20%	46157	54.31%	1804	2.12%	1509	1.78%	1354	1.59%	-11990	-14.11%	84991
Baltimore (County)	12155	55.62%	8839	40.45%	316	1.45%	168	0.77%	376	1.72%	3316	15.17%	21854
Calvert	707	38.63%	1004	54.86%	11	0.60%	82	4.48%	26	1.42%	-297	-16.23%	1830
Caroline	1665	49.54%	1576	46.89%	20	0.60%	14	0.42%	86	2.56%	89	2.65%	3361
Carroll	3522	49.01%	3257	45.32%	78	1.09%	40	0.56%	289	4.02%	265	3.69%	7186
Cecil	2269	52.01%	1926	44.14%	48	1.10%	26	0.60%	94	2.15%	343	7.86%	4363
Charles	1068	35.90%	1841	61.88%	15	0.50%	19	0.64%	32	1.08%	-773	-25.98%	2975
Dorchester	2526	48.35%	2530	48.43%	42	0.80%	22	0.42%	104	1.99%	-4	-0.08%	5224
Frederick	4841	46.28%	5193	49.64%	133	1.27%	123	1.18%	171	1.63%	-352	-3.36%	10461
Garrett	860	29.74%	1802	62.31%	52	1.80%	104	3.60%	74	2.56%	-942	-32.57%	2892
Harford	2473	53.40%	2015	43.51%	67	1.45%	24	0.52%	52	1.12%	458	9.89%	4631
Howard	1798	58.82%	1104	36.11%	31	1.01%	17	0.56%	107	3.50%	694	22.70%	3057
Kent	1849	52.68%	1557	44.36%	46	1.31%	15	0.43%	43	1.23%	292	8.32%	3510
Montgomery	3397	54.31%	2648	42.33%	45	0.72%	50	0.80%	115	1.84%	749	11.97%	6255
Prince George's	2795	52.81%	2236	42.24%	56	1.06%	88	1.66%	118	2.23%	559	10.56%	5293
Queen Anne's	1943	56.70%	1365	39.83%	27	0.79%	16	0.47%	76	2.22%	578	16.87%	3427
St. Mary's	1124	43.52%	1343	51.99%	22	0.85%	36	1.39%	58	2.25%	-219	-8.48%	2583
Somerset	1408	38.91%	2082	57.53%	36	0.99%	15	0.41%	78	2.16%	-674	-18.62%	3619
Talbot	1910	49.16%	1808	46.54%	43	1.11%	12	0.31%	112	2.88%	102	2.63%	3885
Washington	4347	46.30%	4125	43.93%	536	5.71%	274	2.92%	107	1.14%	222	2.36%	9389
Wicomico	2221	43.33%	2615	51.01%	88	1.72%	20	0.39%	182	3.55%	-394	-7.69%	5126
Worcester	1733	45.57%	1956	51.43%	34	0.89%	7	0.18%	73	1.92%	-223	-5.86%	3803
Total	97921	45.30%	107147	49.56%	3697	1.71%	3306	1.53%	4113	1.90%	-9226	-4.27%	216184

== See also ==
- 1914 United States Senate elections
- 1914 United States elections
