= 1899 Maryland gubernatorial election =

- November 7, 1899
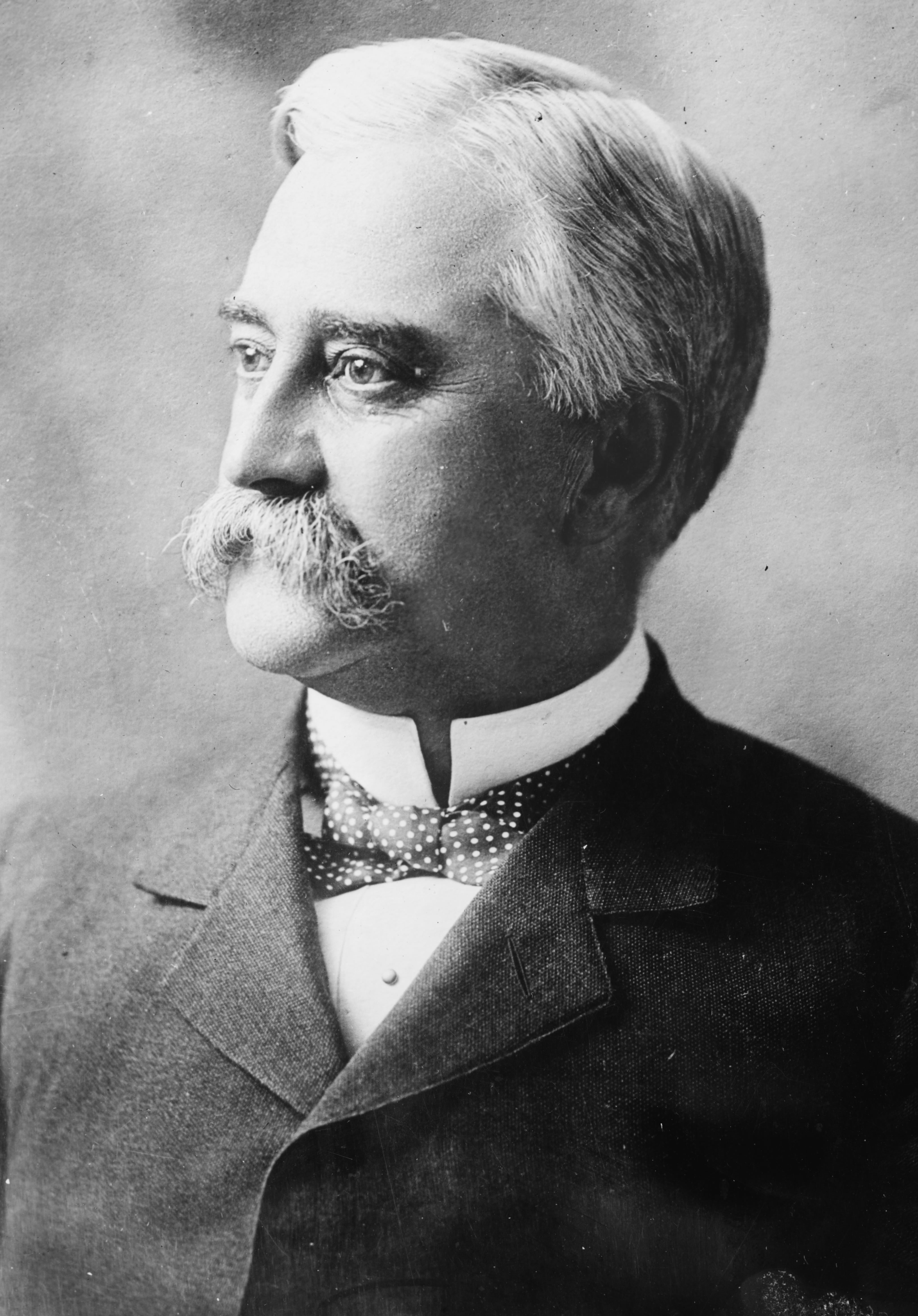

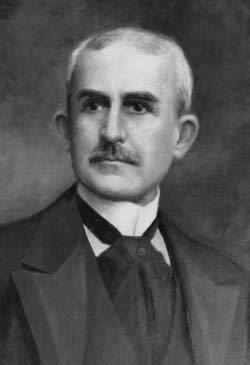
Nominee	John Walter Smith	Lloyd Lowndes Jr.
Party	Democratic	Republican
Popular vote	128,409	116,286
Percentage	51.12%	46.29%
- County results Smith: 40–50% 50–60% 60–70% Lowndes: 40–50% 50–60% 60–70%
Governor before election
Lloyd Lowndes Jr.
Republican
Elected Governor
John Walter Smith
Democratic

The 1899 Maryland gubernatorial election took place on November 7, 1899.

Incumbent Governor Republican Lloyd Lowndes Jr. was defeated by Democratic candidate John Walter Smith.

== General election ==
=== Candidates ===
- Lloyd Lowndes Jr., Republican, incumbent Governor
- John Walter Smith, Democratic, incumbent U.S. Congressman
- William Nevin Hill, Union Reform, physician
- Levin Thomas Jones, Social Democrat
- John A. Rugemer, Socialist Labor
- James Swann, Prohibition, Prohibition candidate for Maryland's 1st congressional district in 1898

=== Results ===
1899 Maryland gubernatorial election
Party	Candidate	Votes	%	±%
Democratic	John Walter Smith	128,409	51.12%	
Republican	Lloyd Lowndes Jr. (incumbent)	116,286	46.29%	
Prohibition	James Swann	5,275	2.10%	
Social Democratic	Levin Thomas Jones	432	0.17%	
Socialist Labor	John A. Rugemer	420	0.17%	
Union Reform Party	William Nevin Hill	367	0.15%	
Write-in	George L. Wellington	3	0.00%	
Majority		12,123	4.83%	
Turnout		251,192	100.00%	
Democratic gain from Republican		Swing		
