= 1944 United States Senate election in Maryland =

- November 7, 1944
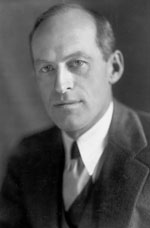

Nominee	Millard Tydings	Blanchard Randall
Party	Democratic	Republican
Popular vote	344,725	213,705
Percentage	61.73%	38.27%
- County results Tydings: 50–60% 60–70% 70–80% Randall: 50–60% 60–70%
U.S. senator before election
Millard Tydings
Democratic
Elected U.S. Senator
Millard Tydings
Democratic

The 1944 United States Senate election in Maryland was held on November 7, 1944. Incumbent Democratic U.S. Senator Millard Tydings was re-elected to a fourth term in office over Republican Blanchard Randall Jr.

== Democratic primary ==
=== Candidates ===
- Charles Baden
- Willis R. Jones
- Vincent F. Long
- Stephen Peddicord, candidate for governor in 1942
- Millard Tydings, incumbent senator since 1927

=== Results ===
1944 Democratic U.S. Senate primary
Party	Candidate	Votes	%
Democratic	Millard Tydings (inc.)	82,304	78.67%
Democratic	Willis R. Jones	16,921	16.17%
Democratic	Charles Baden	2,633	2.52%
Democratic	Stephen Peddicord	1,519	1.45%
Democratic	Vincent F. Long	1,245	1.19%
Total votes		260,310	100.00%

== Republican primary ==
=== Candidates ===
- Rives Matthews
- Blanchard Randall Jr., philanthropist
- Paul Robertson

=== Results ===
1944 Republican U.S. Senate primary
Party	Candidate	Votes	%
Republican	Blanchard Randall Jr.	13,573	49.91%
Republican	Paul Robertson	9,711	35.71%
Republican	Rives Matthews	3,909	14.38%
Total votes		27,193	100.00%

== General election ==
=== Results ===
1944 U.S. Senate election in Maryland
Party	Candidate	Votes	%
Democratic	Millard Tydings (inc.)	344,725	61.73%
Republican	Blanchard Randall Jr.	213,705	38.27%
Total votes		558,430	100.00%
Democratic hold			

=== Results by county ===
County	Millard E. Tydings Democratic		Blanchard Randall Republican		Margin		Total Votes Cast
County	#	%	#	%	#	%	Total Votes Cast
Allegany	14487	49.74%	14636	50.26%	-149	-0.51%	29123
Anne Arundel	12292	61.03%	7850	38.97%	4442	22.05%	20142
Baltimore (City)	156004	64.94%	84206	35.06%	71798	29.89%	240210
Baltimore (County)	35314	60.68%	22883	39.32%	12431	21.36%	58197
Calvert	1911	53.71%	1647	46.29%	264	7.42%	3558
Caroline	3093	59.86%	2074	40.14%	1019	19.72%	5167
Carroll	5942	46.07%	6955	53.93%	-1013	-7.85%	12897
Cecil	5651	70.13%	2407	29.87%	3244	40.26%	8058
Charles	2368	54.76%	1956	45.24%	412	9.53%	4324
Dorchester	5428	64.13%	3036	35.87%	2392	28.26%	8464
Frederick	10227	53.37%	8937	46.63%	1290	6.73%	19164
Garrett	2211	38.82%	3484	61.18%	-1273	-22.35%	5695
Harford	7529	66.78%	3746	33.22%	3783	33.55%	11275
Howard	3909	62.13%	2383	37.87%	1526	24.25%	6292
Kent	3047	65.82%	1582	34.18%	1465	31.65%	4629
Montgomery	21572	62.51%	12938	37.49%	8634	25.02%	34510
Prince George's	18468	69.09%	8263	30.91%	10205	38.18%	26731
Queen Anne's	3516	70.29%	1486	29.71%	2030	40.58%	5002
St. Mary's	2553	61.25%	1615	38.75%	938	22.50%	4168
Somerset	3541	54.54%	2951	45.46%	590	9.09%	6492
Talbot	3871	61.07%	2468	38.93%	1403	22.13%	6339
Washington	11851	52.97%	10523	47.03%	1328	5.94%	22374
Wicomico	3460	64.77%	1882	35.23%	1578	29.54%	5342
Worcester	6480	63.05%	3797	36.95%	2683	26.11%	10277
Total	344725	61.73%	213705	38.27%	131020	23.46%	558430

==== Counties that flipped from Democratic to Republican ====
- Allegany
- Carroll
- Garrett

== See also ==
- 1944 United States Senate elections
- 1944 United States elections
