= 1895 Maryland gubernatorial election =

- November 5, 1895
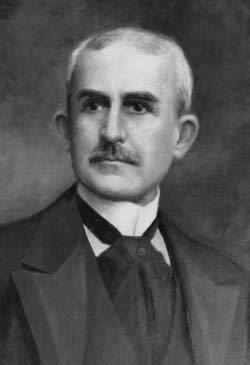

Nominee	Lloyd Lowndes Jr.	John E. Hurst
Party	Republican	Democratic
Popular vote	124,936	106,169
Percentage	52.01%	44.20%
- County results Lowndes: 40–50% 50–60% Hurst: 40–50% 50–60%
Governor before election
Frank Brown
Democratic
Elected Governor
Lloyd Lowndes Jr.
Republican

The 1895 Maryland gubernatorial election took place on November 5, 1895.

Incumbent Governor Frank Brown did not seek re-election.

Republican candidate Lloyd Lowndes Jr. defeated Democratic candidate John E. Hurst.

== General election ==
=== Candidates ===
- John E. Hurst, Democratic, merchant
- Lloyd Lowndes Jr., Republican, former U.S. Congressman
- Joshua Levering, Prohibition, president of the Baltimore Young Men's Christian Association
- Henry F. Andrews, People's and Socialist Labor

=== Results ===
1895 Maryland gubernatorial election
Party	Candidate	Votes	%	±%
Republican	Lloyd Lowndes Jr.	124,936	52.01%	
Democratic	John E. Hurst	106,169	44.20%	
Prohibition	Joshua Levering	7,719	3.21%	
Populist	Henry F. Andrews	989	0.41%	
Socialist Labor	Henry F. Andrews	392	0.16%	
Total	Henry F. Andrews	1,381	0.57%	
Majority		18,767	7.81%	
Turnout		240,205	100.00%	
Republican gain from Democratic		Swing		
