= Millard Tydings =

American politician (1890–1961)

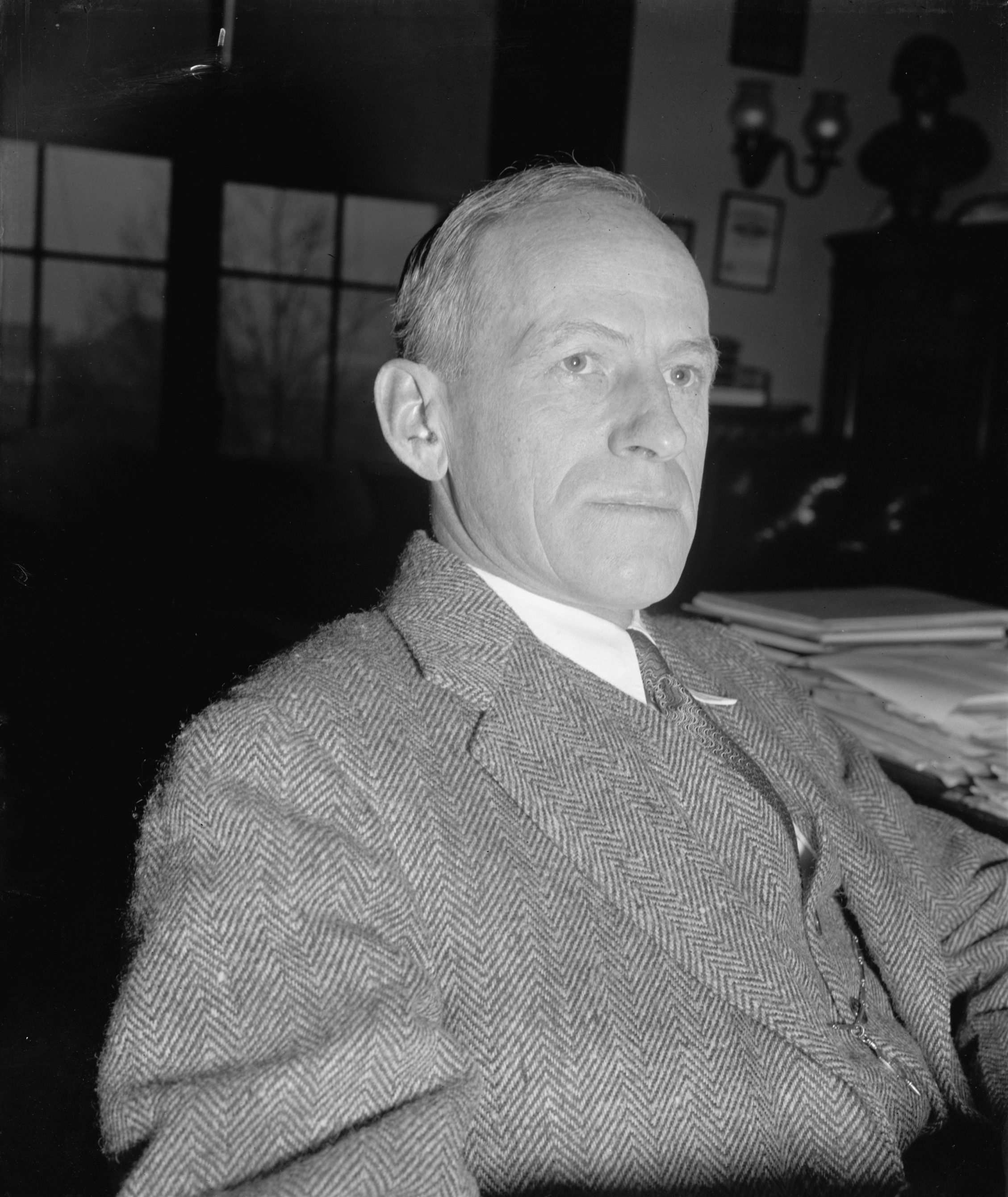
- Tydings in 1939

United States Senator from Maryland
- In office March 4, 1927 – January 3, 1951
- Preceded by: Ovington Weller
- Succeeded by: John Marshall Butler
Committee chairmanships
Chair of the Senate Armed Services Committee
In office January 3, 1949 – January 3, 1951
Preceded by	Chan Gurney
Succeeded by	Richard Russell Jr.
Ranking Member of the Senate Armed Services Committee
In office January 3, 1947 – January 3, 1949
Preceded by	Position created
Succeeded by	Styles Bridges

Member of the U.S. House of Representatives from Maryland's 2nd district
- In office March 4, 1923 – March 3, 1927
- Preceded by: Albert Blakeney
- Succeeded by: William Purington Cole, Jr.

Member of the Maryland Senate
- In office 1922–1923
- Preceded by: J. Royston Stifler
- Succeeded by: David G. Harry
- Constituency: Harford County

87th Speaker of the Maryland House of Delegates
- In office January 1920 – September 1920
- Preceded by: Herbert R. Wooden
- Succeeded by: John L. G. Lee

Member of the Maryland House of Delegates from the Harford County district
- In office 1920–1920 Serving with Frederick Lee Cobourn and J. Fletcher Hopkins
- In office 1916–1917 Serving with Frank E. Baker and Thomas H. Ward

Personal details
- Born: Millard Evelyn Tydings; April 6, 1890 Havre de Grace, Maryland, U.S.
- Died: February 9, 1961 (aged 70) near Havre de Grace, Maryland, U.S.
- Resting place: Angel Hill Cemetery; Havre de Grace, Maryland, U.S.
- Party: Democratic
- Spouse: Eleanor (Davies) Cheesborough
- Education: University of Maryland
- Profession: Civil engineer, lawyer, politician, author

Military service
- Allegiance: United States
- Branch/service: United States Army
- Years of service: 1917–1919
- Rank: Lieutenant Colonel
- Battles/wars: World War I

Millard Evelyn Tydings (April 6, 1890 – February 9, 1961) was an American attorney, author, soldier, state legislator, and served as a Democratic Representative and Senator in the United States Congress from Maryland, serving in the House from 1923 to 1927 and in the Senate from 1927 to 1951.

== Early life and education ==
Tydings was born in Havre de Grace, located in Harford County, and was the son of Mary Bond (O'Neill) and Millard Fillmore Tydings. He attended the public schools of Harford County and graduated from Maryland Agricultural College (now the University of Maryland, College Park) in 1910. He engaged in civil engineering with the Baltimore and Ohio Railroad in West Virginia in 1911. He studied law at the University of Maryland School of Law, in Baltimore, and was admitted to the bar; he started practice in Havre de Grace in 1913.

In 1916 Tydings was elected to the Maryland House of Delegates; he was elected as Speaker of the House by his colleagues from 1920 to 1922. He served in the Maryland State Senate during 1922–1923.

Tydings served in the U.S. Army during World War I and was promoted to lieutenant colonel and division machine-gun officer in 1918. He served on the Western Front with the American Expeditionary Forces and received the Distinguished Service Cross and Army Distinguished Service Medal.

== House and Senate career ==
Tydings seated with Patrick Joseph Sullivan and David S. Ingalls at a special senate subcomittee on naval affairs in 1930

In 1922, Tydings was elected as a Democrat to the 68th session of the U.S. Congress, and was re-elected to the 69th session, representing the second district of Maryland (March 4, 1923 – March 3, 1927) in the House of Representatives. He was not a candidate for renomination in 1926, having become a candidate for the United States Senate.

He was elected to the Senate in 1926, 1932, 1938 and 1944, and served from March 4, 1927, to January 3, 1951. With Alabama Representative John McDuffie, he co-sponsored the Philippine Independence Act, commonly known as the Tydings–McDuffie Act, which established an autonomous 10-year Commonwealth status for the Philippines. It was planned to culminate in the withdrawal of American sovereignty and the recognition of Philippine Independence.

In January 1934, Tydings introduced a resolution "condemning Nazi oppression of Jews in Germany, and asking President Roosevelt to inform the Hitler government that this country was profoundly distressed about its antisemitic measures." His resolution was bottled up in the Senate Foreign Relations Committee.

In 1936, Senator Tydings introduced a bill in Congress calling for independence for Puerto Rico, but it was opposed by Luis Muñoz Marín, an influential leader of Puerto Rico's pro-independence Liberal Party. Tydings did not gain passage of the bill.

Tydings was a candidate for the presidential nomination at the 1940 Democratic National Convention.

Following the end of World War II, when the U.S. dropped two atomic bombs on Japan, Tydings sponsored a bill calling for the U.S. to lead the world in nuclear disarmament.

In March 1950, Tydings was appointed to head a committee, generally known as the Tydings Committee, to investigate Joseph McCarthy's early claims of Communist penetration of the federal government and military. The hearings revolved around McCarthy's charge that the fall of the Kuomintang regime in China had been caused by the actions of alleged Soviet spies in the State Department, and his allegation that the Sinologist Owen Lattimore was a "top Russian agent." The hearings, held from March to July 1950, were stormy as charge was met with counter-charge. In McCarthy's first 250 minutes on the stand, Tydings interrupted him 85 times with questions and demands for substantiation, enraging McCarthy who condemned Tydings as an "egg-sucking liberal". As such, the trial attracted much media attention, especially after Louis F. Budenz entered the proceedings as a surprise witness supporting McCarthy's charges. In July, the committee published its report, concluding that McCarthy's accusations were spurious and condemning his charges as an intentionally nefarious hoax.

When Tydings ran for re-election in 1950, he battled Senator McCarthy and would dismiss the Senator's claims of Communist infiltration of the State Department as "a fraud and a hoax." McCarthy's staff distributed a composite picture of Tydings with Earl Browder, the former leader of the American Communist Party. Tydings had never met him before Browder testified in July 1950. The composite photo merged a 1938 photo of Tydings listening to the radio and a 1940 photo of Browder delivering a speech; the text under the composite photo stated that when Browder had testified before Tydings's committee, Tydings had said, "Thank you, sir." Although the quote was technically accurate, it was generally held to be misleading, as it implied a degree of amity between Browder and Tydings that did not exist.

In the 1950 election, Tydings was defeated by John Marshall Butler. In 1956, he was nominated as the Democratic candidate for the United States Senate but withdrew before election due to ill health.

During his congressional service, Tydings was chairman of the United States Senate Committee on Territories and Insular Affairs (73rd through 79th Congresses), the Subcommittee on the Investigation of Loyalty of State Department Employees ("Tydings Subcommittee") (81st Congress), and the U.S. Senate Committee on Armed Services (81st Congress).

=== Controversies ===
During his time in the Senate, Tydings was well known for taking principled, controversial, often unusual stands on various issues. As a centrist Democrat, Tydings cautiously backed the New Deal, while dispensing its jobs as his personal patronage. In 1935, Tydings, who was opposed to the flexibility which the U.S. Treasury had accrued with respect to debt management, proposed a constitutional amendment which would have prohibited appropriations in excess of revenues in the absence of a new debt authorization and would required that any new debt be liquidated over a 15-year period. He was a strong critic of Prohibition prior to its repeal in 1933.

Tydings in 1937 broke with President Franklin Roosevelt, by opposing the president's "court packing" proposal. In retaliation Roosevelt campaigned against him in 1938, speaking in Eastern Maryland on behalf of his opponent, Congressman David J. Lewis. The state's newspapers overwhelmingly supported Tydings and denounced Roosevelt's interference. Tydings easily won re-election; the failure of the Roosevelt "purge" strengthened Tydings's leadership of Maryland Democrats, and made him a plausible successor to Roosevelt should the president not run for releection in 1940. According to Philip A. Grant Jr.:

Tydings' solid victory was interpreted as a serious political blow to the president, yet Roosevelt's 1940 performance in Maryland was creditable, suggesting that state Democrats, while resenting the assault on Tydings, nevertheless favored the New Deal and FDR's leadership. The equation of newspaper opinion with public opinion, in this case, is erroneous. Tydings won on his own record and merits, and the impact of the President's politicking was probably negligible.

Biographer Caroline H. Keith is sympathetic in general, but concludes that Tydings' intense vitriol, harshness and arrogance left him an isolated politician with few friends.

== Death and legacy ==
Millard E. Tydings died on February 9, 1961, at his farm, "Oakington", near Havre de Grace, Maryland. He was buried in Angel Hill Cemetery. Tydings' gravestone incorrectly gives his Senate election year (1926) as the start of his Senate service, which began in 1927.

- The Millard E. Tydings Memorial Bridge, which carries Interstate 95 across the Susquehanna River, is named in his honor.
- Millard E. Tydings Hall at the University of Maryland, College Park, which houses the departments of Government & Politics and Economics, is also named for him.

Tydings' adopted son, Joseph Tydings, was elected to a term as a U.S. Senator from Maryland in 1964, but was defeated for re-election in 1970, serving from 1965 to 1971.

His wife was Eleanor (Davies) Cheesborough (former wife of Thomas Patton Cheesborough, Jr.), who married Rev. Lowell Russell Ditzen after Tydings's death. Her father was Joseph E. Davies, who served as U.S. Ambassador to the USSR, Belgium and Luxembourg.

Tydings' granddaughter Alexandra Tydings is an actress.

The law firm which Millard Tydings formed with Morris Rosenberg continues its law practice today in Baltimore, Maryland.

== Bibliography ==
- Grant Jr., Philip A. "Maryland Press Reaction to the Roosevelt-Tydings Confrontation." Maryland Historical Magazine 68#4 (1973): 422–437.
- Keith, Caroline H., For Hell and a Brown Mule: The Biography of Senator Millard E. Tydings, Madison Books, 1991. ISBN 0-8191-8063-7

Party political offices
Preceded by John Walter Smith	Democratic nominee for U.S. Senator from Maryland (Class 3); 1926, 1932, 1938, 1944, 1950	Succeeded by George P. Mahoney
Political offices
Preceded by Herbert R. Wooden	Speaker of the Maryland House of Delegates; 1920	Succeeded by John L. G. Lee
Preceded by Chan Gurney	Chairman of the Senate Armed Services Committee; 1949–1951	Succeeded by Richard B. Russell, Jr.
U.S. House of Representatives
Preceded by Albert Blakeney	Member of the U.S. House of Representatives from Maryland's 2nd congressional district 1923–1927	Succeeded by William Purington Cole, Jr.
U.S. Senate
Preceded by Ovington Weller	U.S. senator (Class 3) from Maryland; 1927–1951; Served alongside: William Cabell Bruce, Phillips Lee Goldsborough, George L. P. Radcliffe, Herbert O'Conor	Succeeded by John Marshall Butler
