= John Walter Smith =

American politician (1845–1925)

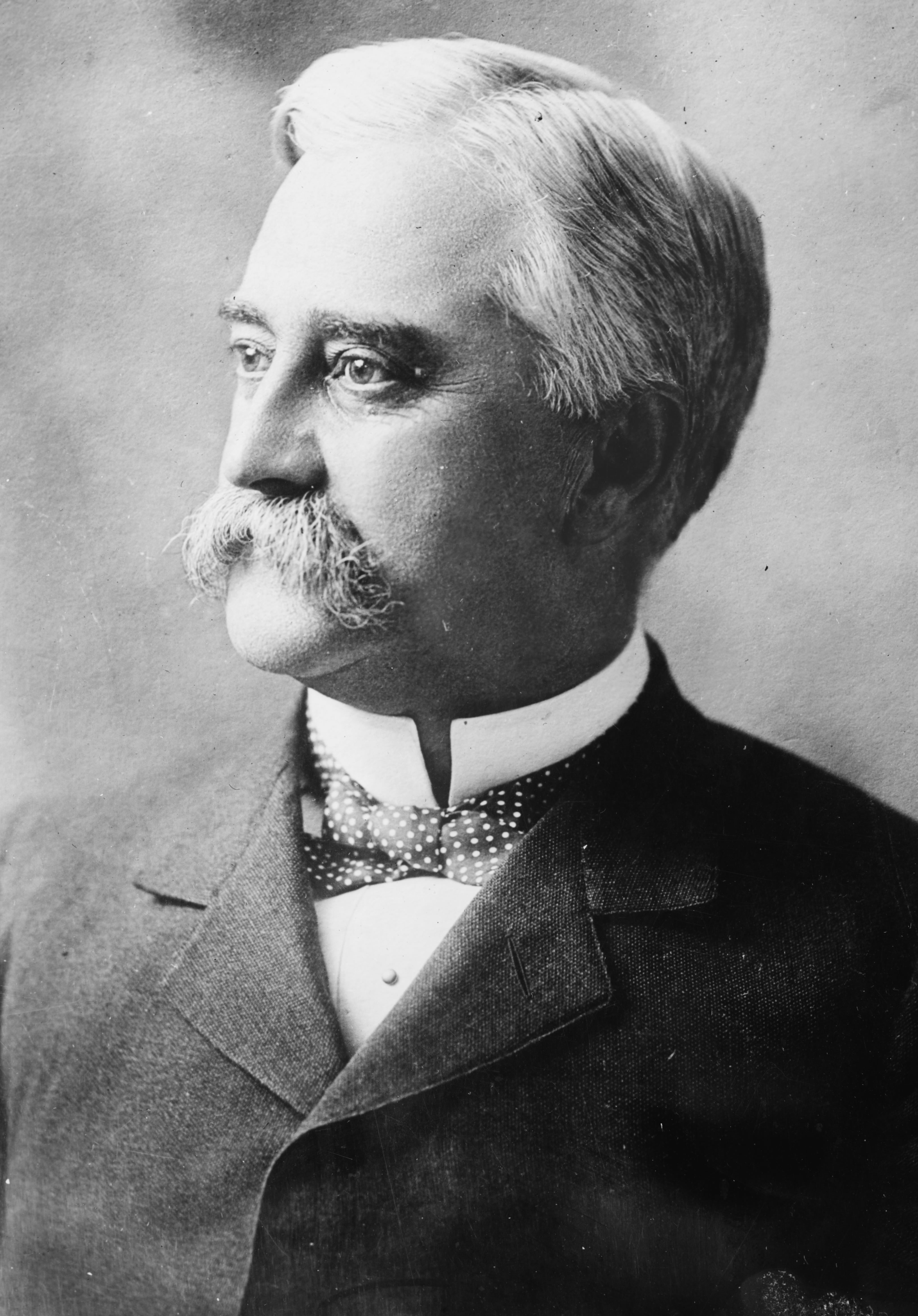

United States Senator from Maryland
- In office March 25, 1908 – March 3, 1921
- Preceded by: William Pinkney Whyte
- Succeeded by: Ovington Weller

44th Governor of Maryland
- In office January 10, 1900 – January 13, 1904
- Preceded by: Lloyd Lowndes Jr.
- Succeeded by: Edwin Warfield

Member of the U.S. House of Representatives from Maryland's 1st district
- In office March 4, 1899 – January 12, 1900
- Preceded by: Isaac A. Barber
- Succeeded by: Josiah L. Kerr

Member of the Maryland State Senate
- In office 1890–1899
- Preceded by: Samuel K. Dennis
- Succeeded by: John P. Moore

Personal details
- Born: February 5, 1845 Snow Hill, Maryland, U.S.
- Died: April 19, 1925 (aged 80) Baltimore, Maryland, U.S.
- Party: Democratic
- Spouse: Mary Frances Richardson
- Children: 2

John Walter Smith (February 5, 1845 – April 19, 1925) was an American politician and a member of the Democratic Party who held several public offices representing the state of Maryland. From 1899 to 1900, he was a U.S. congressman for the 1st district of Maryland; from 1900 to 1904, he was the 44th governor of Maryland; and from 1908 to 1921, he served in the U.S. Senate, first as the junior senator for Maryland, and from November 1912 as the senior senator.

== Early life and career ==
Smith was born at Snow Hill, Maryland, and attended private schools and Union Academy. His mother died when he was five weeks old, and his father died when he was five years old. Ephraim King Wilson, Smith's cousin, assumed guardianship of Smith and raised him. He engaged in the lumber business in Maryland, Virginia, and North Carolina before becoming president of the First National Bank of Snow Hill and director in many business and financial institutions.

Beginning his political career, Smith was elected to the Maryland State Senate in 1889, 1893, and 1897, and served as president of the Senate in 1894. Following the death of U.S. Senator from Maryland Ephraim K. Wilson in 1891, Smith sought to be elected to replace him, but lost the nomination to fellow Democrat Charles H. Gibson. He was elected to the 56th Congress in 1898 from the 1st Congressional district of Maryland, but served for less than a year before being unexpectedly nominated for Governor of Maryland by the Democratic State Convention in 1899. Smith was victorious against incumbent governor Lloyd Lowndes, Jr.

== Governor of Maryland ==
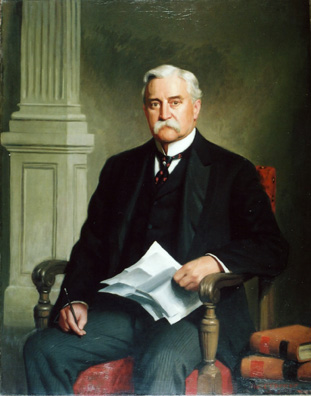
Portrait of Smith, 1904

As Governor, Smith promoted education, labor, and healthcare reform. In education, Smith reorganized the public school system, guaranteed free textbooks for all students, appointed a school superintendent, and removed the Agricultural College of Maryland (now known as the University of Maryland, College Park) from private control and placed it under the guidance of the State. He also improved the State's workmen's compensation program, encouraged a merit system for promotions, reorganized health laws, and constructed a State psychiatric hospital. Governor Smith is also credited with signing into law the Certified Public Accountant Act, making Maryland the third state to create a Profession of Public Accounting with an exam, and state licensing and oversight. Smith also freed the State from much of its debt by the time he departed from the position in 1904.

== U.S. Senate ==
After another unsuccessful attempt at a Senate election in 1904, Smith was elected in January 1908 to succeed William Pinkney Whyte, whose term ended in 1909. When Whyte died in March 1908, Smith was also elected to finish the term. He was re-elected in 1914 and served from March 25, 1908, to March 3, 1921. He lost the election in 1920 for a third term as Senator to Ovington E. Weller.

As senator, Smith was chairman of the Committee to Investigate Trespassers Upon Land (62nd Congress), the Committee on the District of Columbia (63rd through 65th Congresses), and the Committee to Examine Branches of the Civil Service (66th Congress).

Smith retired to private life and died in Baltimore, Maryland, on April 19, 1925, after a short illness. He is buried in the Makemie Memorial Presbyterian Church Cemetery in Snow Hill, Maryland.

Party political offices
Preceded by John E. Hurst	Democratic nominee for Governor of Maryland; 1899	Succeeded by Edwin Warfield
First	Democratic nominee for U.S. Senator from Maryland (Class 3); 1914, 1920	Succeeded by Millard Tydings
Political offices
Preceded by Edward Lloyd VII	President of the Maryland State Senate; 1894	Succeeded by William Cabell Bruce
Preceded by Lloyd Lowndes, Jr.	Governor of Maryland; 1900–1904	Succeeded by Edwin Warfield
U.S. House of Representatives
Preceded by Isaac Ambrose Barber	Member of the U.S. House of Representatives from Maryland's 1st congressional district 1899–1900	Succeeded by Josiah Kerr
U.S. Senate
Preceded by William Pinkney Whyte	U.S. senator (Class 3) from Maryland; 1908–1921; Served alongside: Isidor Rayner, William P. Jackson, Blair Lee I, Joseph Irwin France	Succeeded by Ovington Weller
