= 1932 United States Senate election in Maryland =

- November 8, 1932
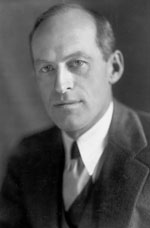

Nominee	Millard Tydings	Wallace Williams
Party	Democratic	Republican
Popular vote	293,389	138,536
Percentage	66.18%	31.25%
- County results Tydings: 40–50% 50–60% 60–70% 70–80% Williams: 50–60%
U.S. senator before election
Millard Tydings
Democratic
Elected U.S. Senator
Millard Tydings
Democratic

The 1932 United States Senate election in Maryland was held on November 8, 1932. Incumbent Democratic U.S. Senator Millard Tydings was re-elected to a second term in office, defeating Republican Wallace Williams.

== Republican primary ==
=== Candidates ===
- Linwood Clark, former U.S. Representative from Baltimore
- Wallace Williams

=== Results ===
1932 Republican U.S. Senate primary
Party	Candidate	Votes	%
Republican	Wallace Williams	24,150	58.66%
Republican	Linwood Clark	17,021	41.34%
Total votes		41,171	100.00%

== General election ==
=== Results ===
1932 U.S. Senate election in Maryland
Party	Candidate	Votes	%
Democratic	Millard Tydings (inc.)	293,389	66.18%
Republican	Wallace Williams	138,536	31.25%
Socialist	William A. Toole	8,105	1.83%
Socialist Labor	Noah S. Twigg	1,859	0.42%
Communist	Carl Bradley	1,449	0.33%
Total votes		443,338	100.00%
Democratic hold			

=== Results by county ===
County	Millard E. Tydings Democratic		Wallace Williams Republican		William A. Toole Socialist		Noah S. Twigg Labor		Carl Bradley Communist		Margin		Total Votes Cast
County	#	%	#	%	#	%	#	%	#	%	#	%	Total Votes Cast
Allegany	11008	48.74%	10350	45.83%	813	3.60%	353	1.56%	60	0.27%	658	2.91%	22584
Anne Arundel	8945	68.35%	3872	29.58%	192	1.47%	48	0.37%	31	0.24%	5073	38.76%	13088
Baltimore (City)	150878	71.07%	54217	25.54%	5730	2.70%	628	0.30%	838	0.39%	96661	45.53%	212291
Baltimore (County)	23592	70.10%	9369	27.84%	500	1.49%	122	0.36%	72	0.21%	14223	42.26%	33655
Calvert	1495	50.52%	1439	48.63%	10	0.34%	6	0.20%	9	0.30%	56	1.89%	2959
Caroline	3172	63.85%	1758	35.39%	14	0.28%	12	0.24%	12	0.24%	1414	28.46%	4968
Carroll	5807	53.54%	4951	45.64%	35	0.32%	36	0.33%	18	0.17%	856	7.89%	10847
Cecil	4222	58.28%	2929	40.43%	43	0.59%	31	0.43%	19	0.26%	1293	17.85%	7244
Charles	1952	56.81%	1425	41.47%	15	0.44%	27	0.79%	17	0.49%	527	15.34%	3436
Dorchester	3905	58.02%	2766	41.09%	20	0.30%	16	0.24%	24	0.36%	1139	16.92%	6731
Frederick	9127	59.49%	5966	38.89%	111	0.72%	94	0.61%	44	0.29%	3161	20.60%	15342
Garrett	1393	41.12%	1885	55.64%	73	2.15%	30	0.89%	7	0.21%	-492	-14.52%	3388
Harford	6106	67.11%	2887	31.73%	55	0.60%	29	0.32%	22	0.24%	3219	35.38%	9099
Howard	3582	68.59%	1576	30.18%	23	0.44%	25	0.48%	16	0.31%	2006	38.41%	5222
Kent	2988	62.91%	1711	36.02%	12	0.25%	31	0.65%	8	0.17%	1277	26.88%	4750
Montgomery	11860	63.18%	6694	35.66%	105	0.56%	73	0.39%	39	0.21%	5166	27.52%	18771
Prince George's	10514	67.81%	4782	30.84%	98	0.63%	73	0.47%	37	0.24%	5732	36.97%	15504
Queen Anne's	3337	69.45%	1416	29.47%	11	0.23%	29	0.60%	12	0.25%	1921	39.98%	4805
St. Mary's	2091	67.32%	970	31.23%	9	0.29%	17	0.55%	19	0.61%	1121	36.09%	3106
Somerset	3689	58.29%	2582	40.80%	19	0.30%	15	0.24%	24	0.38%	1107	17.49%	6329
Talbot	4026	62.94%	2321	36.28%	18	0.28%	17	0.27%	15	0.23%	1705	26.65%	6397
Washington	10431	56.97%	7574	41.36%	158	0.86%	86	0.47%	62	0.34%	2857	15.60%	18311
Wicomico	3154	64.12%	1724	35.05%	12	0.24%	16	0.33%	13	0.26%	1430	29.07%	4919
Worcester	6055	65.37%	3102	33.49%	29	0.31%	45	0.49%	31	0.33%	2953	31.88%	9262
Total	293329	66.21%	138266	31.21%	8105	1.83%	1859	0.42%	1449	0.33%	155063	35.00%	443008

==== Counties that flipped from Republican to Democratic ====
- Allegany
- Calvert
- Charles
- Frederick
- Somerset
- Washington

== See also ==
- 1932 United States Senate elections
- 1932 United States elections
