= 1938 United States Senate election in Maryland =

- November 8, 1938
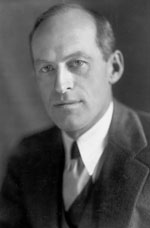

Nominee	Millard Tydings	Oscar Leser
Party	Democratic	Republican
Popular vote	357,245	153,253
Percentage	68.28%	29.29%
- County results Tydings: 50–60% 60–70% 70–80%
U.S. senator before election
Millard Tydings
Democratic
Elected U.S. Senator
Millard Tydings
Democratic

The 1938 United States Senate election in Maryland was held on November 8, 1938. Incumbent Democratic U.S. Senator Millard Tydings was re-elected to a third term in office, easily defeating Republican Oscar Leser.

Primary elections were held on September 12. Millard Tydings faced a primary challenge from U.S. Representative David John Lewis, who was backed by President Franklin D. Roosevelt in the President's attempt to purge the Democratic Party of conservatives. He survived comfortably by a two-to-one margin. Leser defeated Galen L. Tait for the Republican nomination.

As of 2023, this was the last time a Democratic candidate for Senate won every county in Maryland.

== Democratic primary ==
=== Candidates ===
- Arthur E. Hungerford
- David John Lewis, U.S. Representative from Cumberland
- Millard Tydings, incumbent Senator since 1927

=== Campaign ===
Senator Millard Tydings, a member of the conservative Southern wing of the Democratic Party, was opposed to President Franklin Delano Roosevelt's New Deal from the beginning and voted against most of its provisions. Though Tydings began reconciliation with the administration over growing international concerns, Roosevelt's top priority in the 1938 midterms remained economic recovery and the Second New Deal. He privately told Interior Secretary Harold L. Ickes to "take Tydings' hide off and rub salt in it." Aware of Roosevelt's opposition and popularity, Tydings publicly insisted he supported the "bone and sinew" of the New Deal and that claims of his opposition were "silly propaganda."

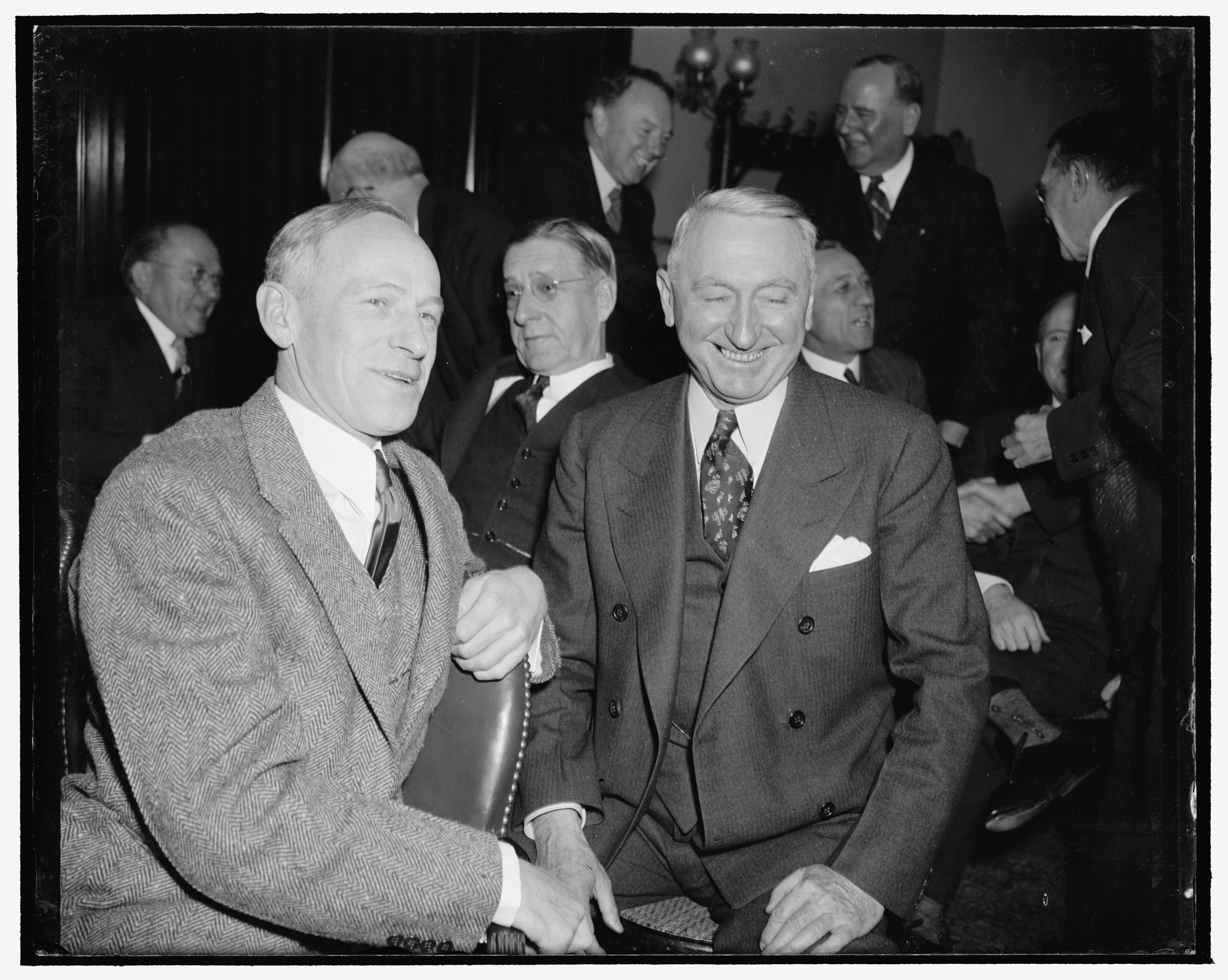
Senator Tydings (left) with Senator Walter F. George. Both were targets of a failed purge of conservatives from the Democratic Party by President Franklin D. Roosevelt.

The Roosevelt administration faced an uphill battle from the start. Tydings retained the backing of junior Senator George L. P. Radcliffe, a New Deal supporter who had been unaware that Roosevelt would target Tydings. The White House settled on U.S. Representative David John Lewis as their preferred candidate only after Lewis and Tydings had announced re-election campaigns and many county organizations had endorsed both men. Once Lewis did announce his challenge to Senator Tydings, leading Maryland Democrats declared neutrality.

Lewis, a former mine worker, did retain the backing of the labor movement in the state, including endorsements from the American Federation of Labor and John L. Lewis. Additional praise from the Maryland Communist Party, however, may have hampered his campaign. Tydings attacked Lewis for his ties to organized labor and appealed to unorganized farmers instead, while Lewis labeled Tydings a "Tory Republican" for his ties to the American Liberty League and support from Republican voters.

Roosevelt himself worked to rally support for Lewis by dispatching political allies to the state and leaning on donors to support the campaign. He entered the campaign personally in August by praising Lewis in the press as a "legislative father" of Social Security and approvingly reciting an editorial arguing Tydings "had betrayed the New Deal in the past and will again." On Labor Day weekend, he campaigned on the conservative Eastern Shore, culminating in a speech in Denton. Though the speech did not mention Tydings by name, Roosevelt praised Lewis and criticized the idea of a politician who would "pretend to be one [thing] and act like the other."

Tydings evaded ideological attacks, maintaining that he was "not running particularly as an Old Dealer nor particularly as a New Dealer but I hope as a square dealer." He framed his campaign as a defense of states' rights against individual rule by Roosevelt, which he referred to as an "invasion." Tydings supporters accused Roosevelt of a move toward "dictatorship," with one editorial calling him Stalin, Mussolini, and Hitler "rolled into one" with "a Harvard accent and a billion dollar smile." The Chicago Tribune framed the race as "Americanism against communism."

=== Results ===
Tydings easily survived the challenge. He may have benefited from the fact that sixty thousand of the Black voters who supported Roosevelt in the 1936 presidential election were registered Republicans.

Primary results by county Tydings: 50–60% 60–70% 70–80% 80–90% Lewis: 50–60% 60–70%

1938 Democratic U.S. Senate primary
Party	Candidate	Votes	%
Democratic	Millard Tydings (inc.)	189,719	58.86%
Democratic	David John Lewis	124,439	38.60%
Democratic	Arthur E. Hungerford	8,186	2.54%
Total votes		322,344	100.00%

=== Aftermath ===
Ultimately, Tydings reconciled with the Roosevelt administration in response to the outbreak of World War II. He was an energetic supporter of the Selective Training and Service Act of 1940, supported repeal of the American arms embargo, and voted in favor of the Lend-Lease Act.

== Republican primary ==
=== Candidates ===
- Oscar Leser, Baltimore City Judge and tax reform activist
- Galen L. Tait, former Chair of the Maryland Republican Party

=== Results ===
1938 Republican U.S. Senate primary
Party	Candidate	Votes	%
Republican	Oscar Leser	48,716	56.69%
Republican	Galen L. Tait	37,225	43.32%
Total votes		85,941	100.00%

== General election ==
=== Results ===
1938 U.S. Senate election in Maryland
Party	Candidate	Votes	%
Democratic	Millard Tydings (inc.)	357,245	68.28%
Republican	Oscar Leser	153,253	29.29%
Union	George W. Hunt	5,784	1.11%
Socialist	Elisabeth Gilman	3,311	0.63%
Labor (Note: Multiple "Labor" parties existed in the United States at this time, including the American Labor Party and Labor Party of the United States. It is not clear to which party Lang belonged.)	Frank N.H. Lang	2,330	0.45%
Communist	Harry Straw	1,301	0.25%
Democratic	David John Lewis (write-in)	12	0.00%
Write-in	All others	2	0.00%
Total votes		523,238	100.00%
Democratic hold			

=== Results by county ===
County	Millard E. Tydings Democratic		Oscar Leser Republican		George W. Hunt Union		Elisabeth Gilman Socialist		Other Other		Margin		Total Votes Cast
County	#	%	#	%	#	%	#	%	#	%	#	%	Total Votes Cast
Allegany	13658	53.58%	10885	42.70%	134	0.53%	228	0.89%	588	2.31%	2773	10.88%	25493
Anne Arundel	13136	67.66%	5882	30.29%	64	0.33%	160	0.82%	174	0.90%	7254	37.36%	19416
Baltimore (City)	162132	68.56%	67092	28.37%	4818	2.04%	1712	0.72%	712	0.30%	95040	40.19%	236466
Baltimore (County)	33389	73.19%	11014	24.14%	396	0.87%	389	0.85%	431	0.94%	22375	49.05%	45619
Calvert	2363	61.87%	1410	36.92%	2	0.05%	7	0.18%	37	0.97%	953	24.95%	3819
Caroline	4061	67.62%	1857	30.92%	14	0.23%	21	0.35%	53	0.88%	2204	36.70%	6006
Carroll	8859	68.04%	3994	30.67%	38	0.29%	77	0.59%	53	0.41%	4865	37.36%	13021
Cecil	6233	70.83%	2426	27.57%	14	0.16%	39	0.44%	88	1.00%	3807	43.26%	8800
Charles	2440	73.47%	856	25.78%	5	0.15%	4	0.12%	16	0.48%	1584	47.70%	3321
Dorchester	5853	61.04%	3604	37.58%	26	0.27%	25	0.26%	81	0.84%	2249	23.45%	9589
Frederick	12048	63.13%	6673	34.96%	50	0.26%	82	0.43%	232	1.22%	5375	28.16%	19085
Garrett	2951	51.28%	2634	45.77%	17	0.30%	54	0.94%	99	1.72%	317	5.51%	5755
Harford	8424	76.57%	2460	22.36%	7	0.06%	35	0.32%	75	0.68%	5964	54.21%	11001
Howard	4609	69.21%	1966	29.52%	16	0.24%	12	0.18%	56	0.84%	2643	39.69%	6659
Kent	3458	68.08%	1581	31.13%	3	0.06%	19	0.37%	18	0.35%	1877	36.96%	5079
Montgomery	17583	74.94%	5557	23.68%	36	0.15%	142	0.61%	145	0.62%	12026	51.26%	23463
Prince George's	14673	73.37%	4941	24.71%	47	0.24%	104	0.52%	233	1.17%	9732	48.66%	19998
Queen Anne's	3998	72.30%	1467	26.53%	5	0.09%	15	0.27%	45	0.81%	2531	45.77%	5530
St. Mary's	3092	70.42%	1230	28.01%	14	0.32%	13	0.30%	42	0.96%	1862	42.40%	4391
Somerset	5032	67.16%	2412	32.19%	5	0.07%	14	0.19%	30	0.40%	2620	34.97%	7493
Talbot	4793	68.45%	2130	30.42%	6	0.09%	35	0.50%	38	0.54%	2663	38.03%	7002
Washington	13576	64.62%	7005	33.34%	51	0.24%	94	0.45%	284	1.35%	6571	31.28%	21010
Wicomico	6450	69.59%	2717	29.31%	13	0.14%	19	0.20%	70	0.76%	3733	40.27%	9269
Worcester	4434	74.66%	1460	24.58%	3	0.05%	11	0.19%	31	0.52%	2974	50.08%	5939
Total	357245	68.28%	153253	29.29%	5784	1.11%	3311	0.63%	3631	0.69%	203992	38.99%	523224

==== Counties that flipped from Republican to Democratic ====
- Garrett

== See also ==
- 1938 United States Senate elections
- 1938 United States elections

== Notes ==
=== Bibliography ===
- Dunn, Susan (2010). Roosevelt's Purge: How FDR Fought to Change the Democratic Party. Cambridge, Mass.: Belknap Press of Harvard University Press.
