= Lloyd Lowndes Jr. =

American politician (1845–1905)

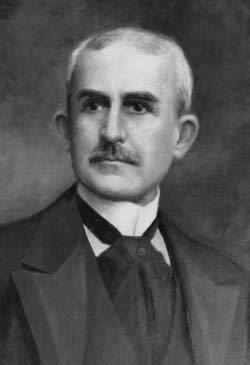

43rd Governor of Maryland
- In office January 8, 1896 – January 10, 1900
- Preceded by: Frank Brown
- Succeeded by: John Walter Smith

United States House of Representatives, Maryland District 6
- In office March 4, 1873 – March 3, 1875
- Preceded by: new district
- Succeeded by: William Walsh

Personal details
- Born: February 21, 1845 Clarksburg, Virginia (now West Virginia), U.S.
- Died: January 8, 1905 (aged 59) Cumberland, Maryland, U.S.
- Party: Republican
- Spouse: Elizabeth Tasker
- Children: 6

Lloyd Lowndes Jr. (February 21, 1845 – January 8, 1905) was an American attorney and politician who served as the 43rd governor of Maryland from 1896 to 1900 and a member of the U.S. House of Representatives from the sixth district of Maryland from 1873 to 1875.

He was a member of the Republican Party.

== Early life and education ==
He was born in 1845 in Clarksburg, Virginia (now West Virginia), son of Lloyd Lowndes and Elizabeth Moore; he was a great-grandson of early Bladensburg, Maryland settler Christopher Lowndes. He attended Allegheny College in Pennsylvania, where he was a member of Phi Kappa Psi fraternity. He graduated from the law department of the University of Pennsylvania at Philadelphia in 1867.

== Marriage and family ==
He married his first cousin, Elizabeth Tasker Lowndes, daughter of Richard Tasker Lowndes and Louisa Black.

== Political career ==
Coat of Arms of Lloyd Lowndes, Jr.

After starting his law practice, Lowndes turned to politics. He found that the Democratic Party was regaining political control in Maryland. After being elected to one term in Congress in 1872, he did not succeed in gaining re-election after his term ended in 1875. He returned to his law practice.

At the end of the century, however, Lowndes ran for governor in 1896, was supported by a strong Republican biracial coalition, and won the election. In addition, Maryland was one of several "border states" that had voted for Republican candidate William McKinley in a major sweep that showed a realignment nationally; Lowndes and some Republican state legislators and congressmen, such as Sydney Emanuel Mudd, were likely also elected on McKinley's coattails. McKinley's win ended free silver as an issue and American society embraced its industrial present.

Lowndes died in 1905 of heart failure, in Cumberland, Maryland, and is buried at the Rose Hill Cemetery there.

Party political offices
Preceded by William J. Vannort	Republican nominee for Governor of Maryland; 1895, 1899	Succeeded by Stevenson A. Williams
U.S. House of Representatives
Preceded by new district	U.S. Congressman, Maryland's 6th District; 1873—1875	Succeeded by William Walsh
Political offices
Preceded by Frank Brown	Governor of Maryland; 1896–1900	Succeeded by John Walter Smith
