= 1926 United States Senate election in Maryland =

- November 2, 1926
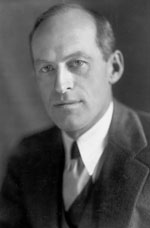

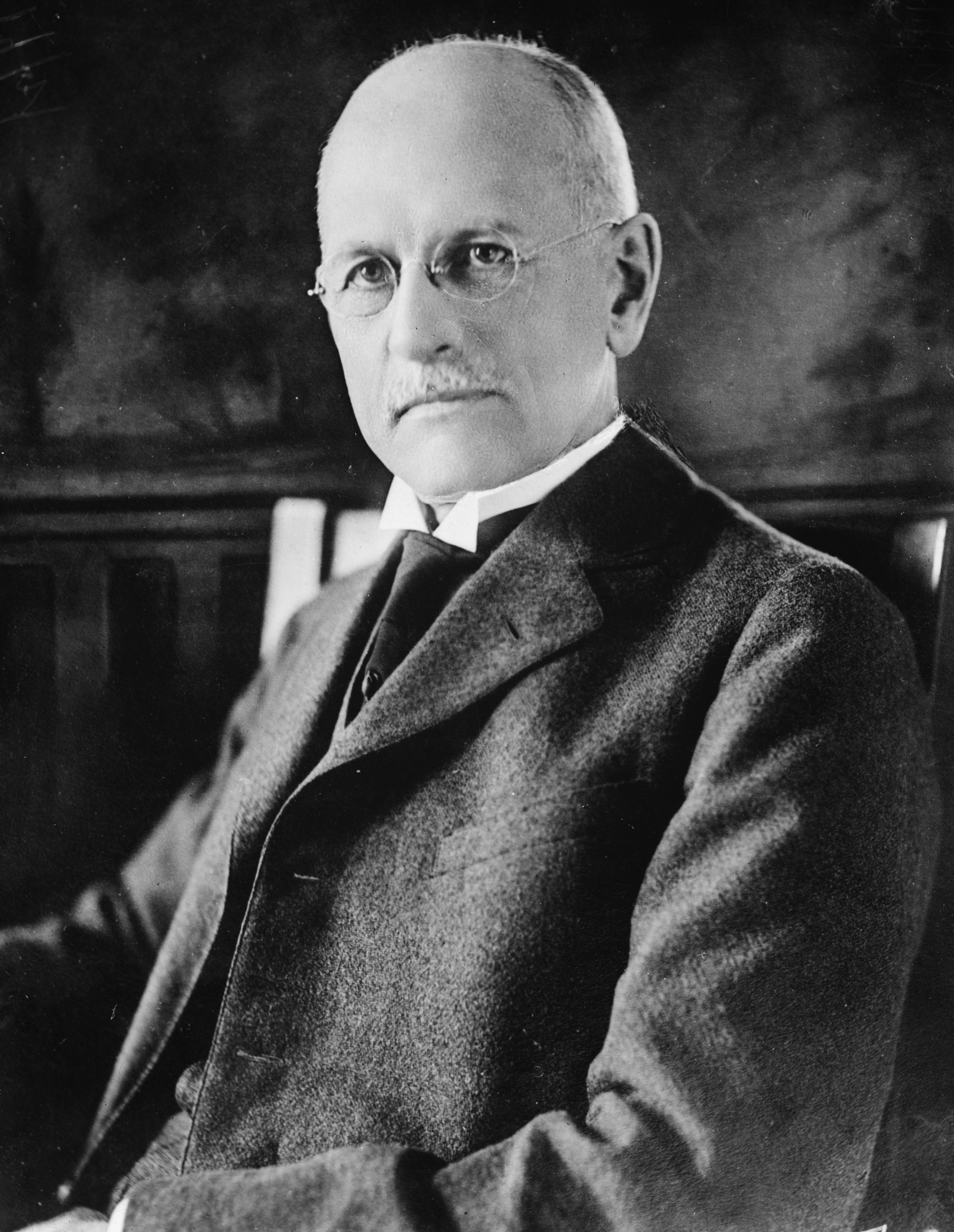
| Nominee | Millard Tydings | Ovington Weller |
| Party | Democratic | Republican |
| Popular vote | 195,410 | 140,695 |
| Percentage | 57.51% | 41.41% |
- County results Weller: 50–60% 60–70% Tydings: 50–60% 60–70% 70–80%
U.S. senator before election
Ovington Weller
Republican
Elected U.S. Senator
Millard Tydings
Democratic

The 1926 United States Senate election in Maryland was held on November 2, 1926. Incumbent Republican U.S. Senator Ovington Weller ran for re-election to a second term in office, but was beaten badly by Democratic U.S. Representative Millard Tydings of Havre de Grace.

== Republican primary ==
=== Candidates ===
- John Philip Hill, U.S. Representative from Baltimore
- Ovington Weller, incumbent Senator since 1921

=== Results ===
1926 Republican U.S. Senate primary
| Party | Candidate | Votes | % |
|---|---|---|---|
| Republican | Ovington Weller (inc.) | 39,760 | 52.01% |
| Republican | John Philip Hill | 36,687 | 47.99% |
| Total votes | | 76,447 | 100.00% |

== General election ==
=== Results ===
1926 U.S. Senate election in Maryland
| Party | Candidate | Votes | % |
|---|---|---|---|
| Democratic | Millard Tydings | 195,410 | 57.51% |
| Republican | Ovington Weller (inc.) | 140,695 | 41.41% |
| Socialist | William A. Toole | 3,659 | 1.08% |
| Total votes | | 339,764 | 100.00% |
| Democratic gain from Republican | | | |

=== Results by county ===
| County | Millard E. Tydings Democratic | | Ovington E. Weller Republican | | William A. Toole Socialist | | Margin | | Total Votes Cast |
| County | # | % | # | % | # | % | # | % | Total Votes Cast |
|---|---|---|---|---|---|---|---|---|---|
| Allegany | 6249 | 40.37% | 8964 | 57.90% | 268 | 1.73% | -2715 | -17.54% | 15481 |
| Anne Arundel | 6276 | 55.69% | 4911 | 43.58% | 82 | 0.73% | 1365 | 12.11% | 11269 |
| Baltimore (City) | 94047 | 62.23% | 54827 | 36.28% | 2245 | 1.49% | 39220 | 25.95% | 151119 |
| Baltimore (County) | 14581 | 63.23% | 8283 | 35.92% | 198 | 0.86% | 6298 | 27.31% | 23062 |
| Calvert | 1281 | 46.72% | 1444 | 52.66% | 17 | 0.62% | -163 | -5.94% | 2742 |
| Caroline | 2760 | 56.01% | 2141 | 43.45% | 27 | 0.55% | 619 | 12.56% | 4928 |
| Carroll | 5230 | 51.68% | 4848 | 47.91% | 42 | 0.42% | 382 | 3.77% | 10120 |
| Cecil | 3634 | 55.45% | 2862 | 43.67% | 58 | 0.88% | 772 | 11.78% | 6554 |
| Charles | 1257 | 39.16% | 1937 | 60.34% | 16 | 0.50% | -680 | -21.18% | 3210 |
| Dorchester | 3685 | 51.83% | 3380 | 47.54% | 45 | 0.63% | 305 | 4.29% | 7110 |
| Frederick | 7769 | 49.12% | 7954 | 50.29% | 93 | 0.59% | -185 | -1.17% | 15816 |
| Garrett | 1182 | 32.46% | 2419 | 66.44% | 40 | 1.10% | -1237 | -33.97% | 3641 |
| Harford | 4847 | 61.04% | 3048 | 38.38% | 46 | 0.58% | 1799 | 22.65% | 7941 |
| Howard | 3294 | 60.41% | 2120 | 38.88% | 39 | 0.72% | 1174 | 21.53% | 5453 |
| Kent | 2819 | 60.21% | 1843 | 39.36% | 20 | 0.43% | 976 | 20.85% | 4682 |
| Montgomery | 6632 | 53.95% | 5589 | 45.46% | 72 | 0.59% | 1043 | 8.48% | 12293 |
| Prince George's | 6098 | 54.49% | 4989 | 44.58% | 105 | 0.94% | 1109 | 9.91% | 11192 |
| Queen Anne's | 2936 | 70.58% | 1211 | 29.11% | 13 | 0.31% | 1725 | 41.47% | 4160 |
| St. Mary's | 1980 | 58.18% | 1398 | 41.08% | 25 | 0.73% | 582 | 17.10% | 3403 |
| Somerset | 2618 | 45.36% | 3139 | 54.38% | 15 | 0.26% | -521 | -9.03% | 5772 |
| Talbot | 3028 | 59.09% | 2075 | 40.50% | 21 | 0.41% | 953 | 18.60% | 5124 |
| Washington | 5689 | 46.32% | 6480 | 52.76% | 112 | 0.91% | -791 | -6.44% | 12281 |
| Wicomico | 4312 | 59.17% | 2948 | 40.45% | 28 | 0.38% | 1364 | 18.72% | 7288 |
| Worcester | 3206 | 72.48% | 1185 | 26.79% | 32 | 0.72% | 2021 | 45.69% | 4423 |
| Total | 195410 | 57.63% | 139995 | 41.29% | 3659 | 1.08% | 55415 | 16.34% | 339064 |

==== Counties that flipped from Republican to Democratic ====
- Anne Arundel
- Baltimore (City)
- Carroll
- Prince George's
- St. Mary's
- Washington

== See also ==
- 1926 United States Senate elections
- 1926 United States elections
