= William Walsh (Maryland politician) =

American politician

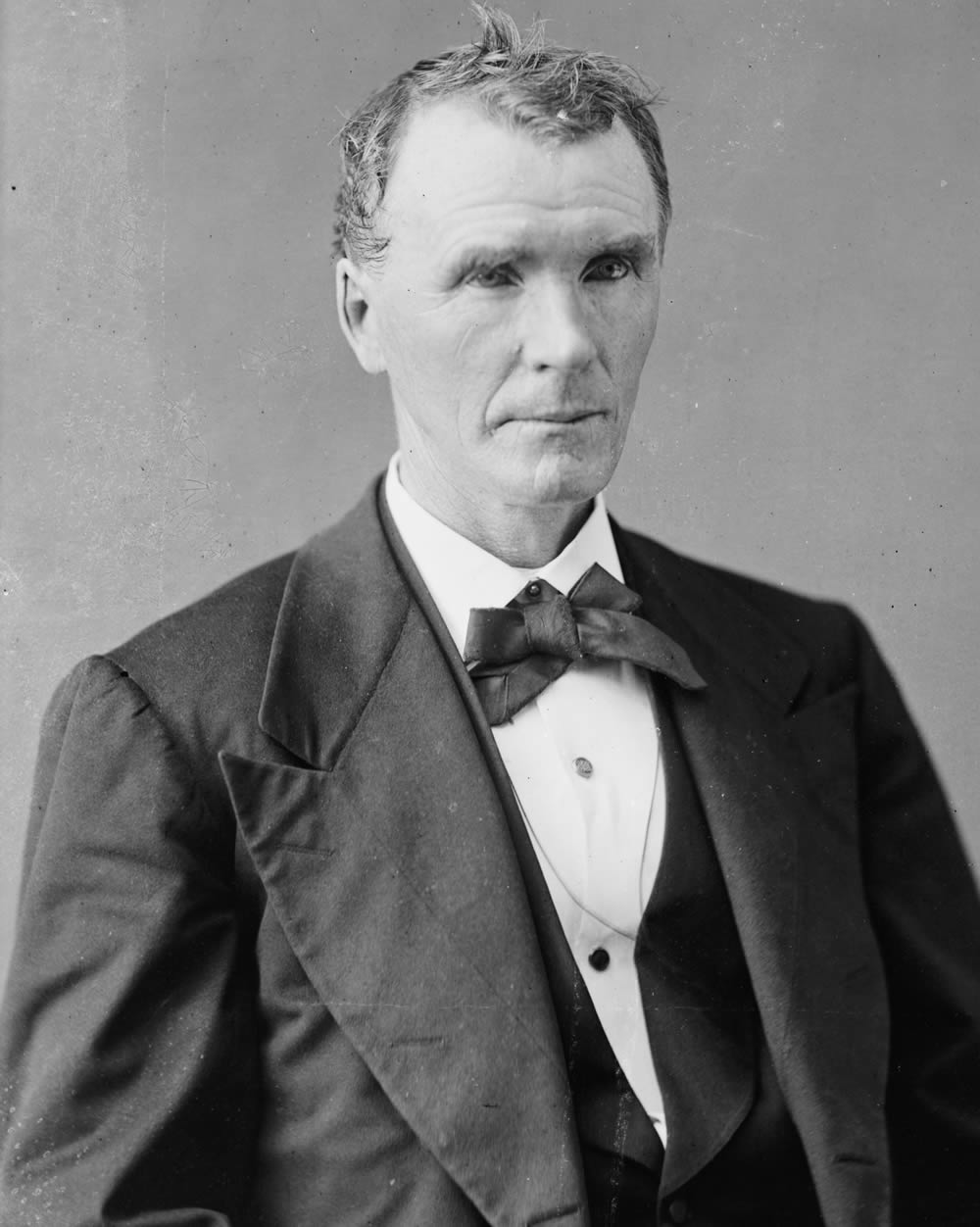

Member of the U.S. House of Representatives from Maryland's 6th district
- In office March 4, 1875 – March 3, 1879
- Preceded by: Lloyd Lowndes, Jr.
- Succeeded by: Milton G. Urner

Personal details
- Born: May 11, 1828 killeenmore County Offaly, Ireland, U.S.
- Died: May 17, 1892 (aged 64) Cumberland, Maryland, U.S.

William Walsh (May 11, 1828 – May 17, 1892) was an American politician who represented Maryland's 6th congressional district in the United States House of Representatives for two terms from 1875 until 1879.

Born in Killeenmore, County Offaly, Ireland, Walsh emigrated to the United States in 1842 and settled in Virginia. He graduated from Mount St. Mary's College of Emmitsburg, Maryland, and began studying law. He was admitted to the bar in Virginia in 1850, and commenced practice in Cumberland, Maryland in 1852.

Walsh served as a member of the Maryland Constitutional convention in 1867, and was later elected as a Democrat to the Forty-fourth and Forty-fifth Congresses (serving from March 4, 1875, until March 3, 1879). In Congress, he served as chairman of the Committee on Revision of the Laws (Forty-fifth Congress), but declined to be a candidate for renomination in 1878. He resumed the practice of law afterwards, and died in Cumberland in 1892. Walsh is interred in St. Patrick's Cemetery.

U.S. House of Representatives
Preceded by Lloyd Lowndes, Jr.	U.S. Congressman from the 6th district of Maryland; 1875–1879	Succeeded by Milton G. Urner
