= 1920 United States Senate election in Maryland =

- November 2, 1920
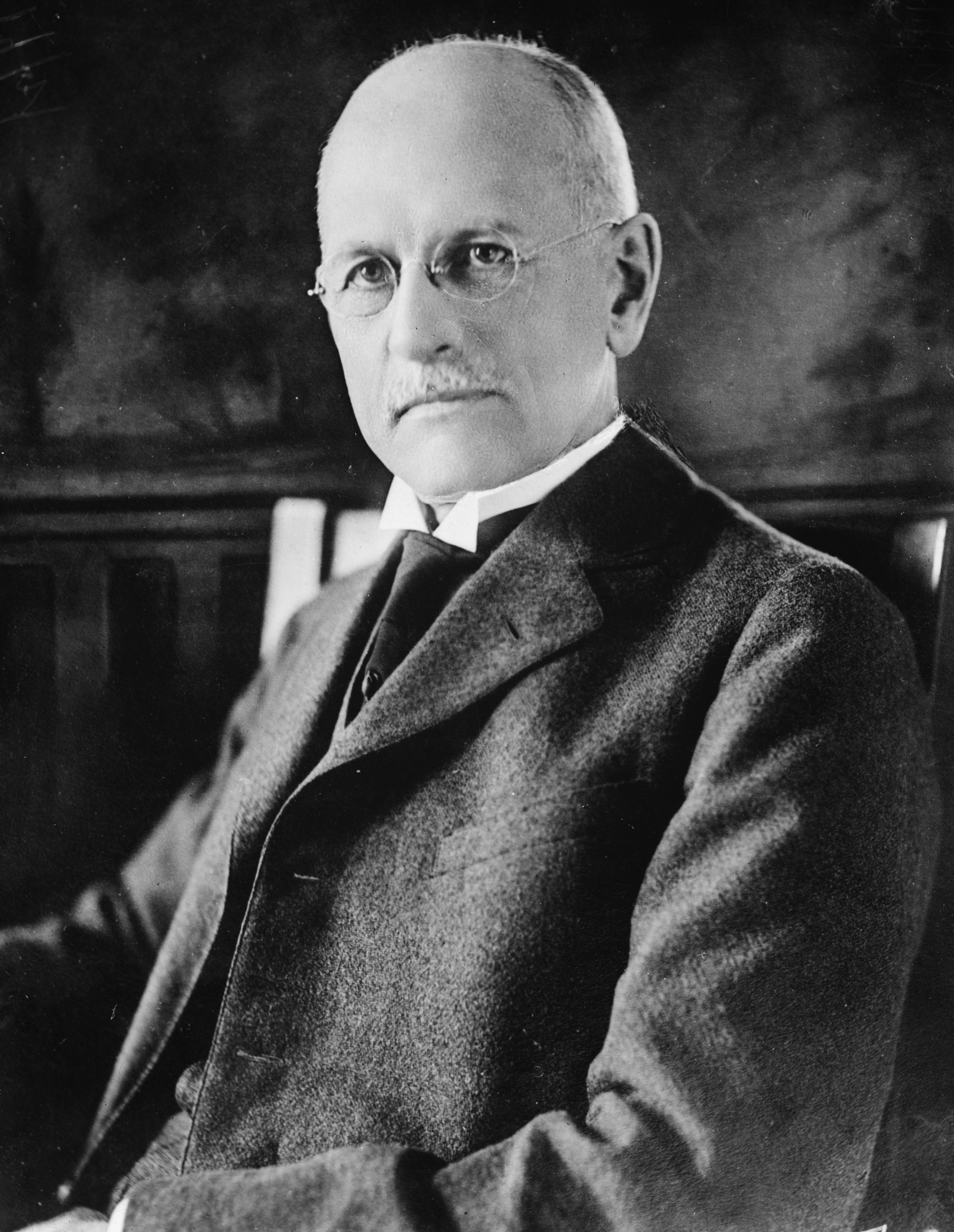

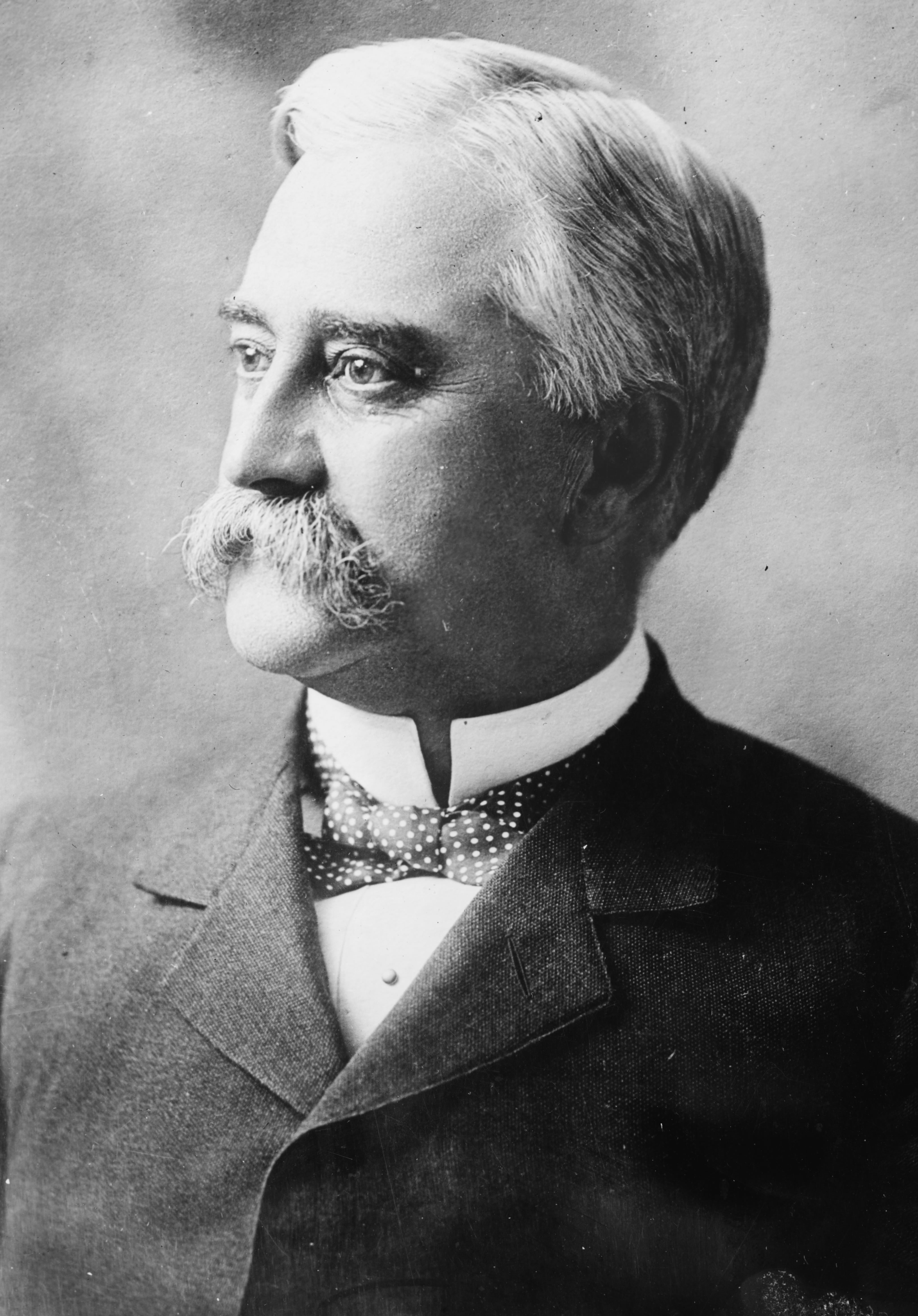

Nominee	Ovington Weller	John Walter Smith	George Iverson Jr.
Party	Republican	Democratic	Independent
Popular vote	184,999	169,200	21,345
Percentage	47.29%	43.25%	5.46%
- County results Weller: 40–50% 50–60% 60–70% Smith: 40–50% 50–60% 60–70%
U.S. senator before election
John Walter Smith
Democratic
Elected U.S. Senator
Ovington Weller
Republican

The 1920 United States Senate election in Maryland was held on November 2, 1920. Incumbent Democratic U.S. Senator John Walter Smith ran for re-election to a third term in office, but was beaten by Republican Ovington Weller.

== General election ==
=== Candidates ===
- William Ashbie Hawkins (Independent)
- George D. Iverson Jr., Democratic Delegate from Baltimore City (Independent)
- Frank N.H. Lang (Labor)
- John Walter Smith, incumbent Senator since 1908 (Democratic)
- William A. Toole (Socialist)
- Ovington Weller, Treasurer of the National Republican Senatorial Committee and nominee for Governor in 1915 (Republican)

=== Results ===
1920 U.S. Senate election in Maryland
Party	Candidate	Votes	%
Republican	Ovington Weller	184,999	47.29%
Democratic	John Walter Smith (inc.)	169,200	43.25%
Independent	George D. Iverson Jr.	21,345	5.46%
Socialist	William A. Toole	6,559	1.68%
Independent	William Ashbie Hawkins	6,538	1.67%
Labor	Frank N.H. Lang	2,569	0.66%
Total votes		339,764	100.00%
Republican gain from Democratic			

=== Results by county ===
County	Ovington Weller Republican		John Walter Smith Democratic		William A. Toole Socialist		Other Other		Margin		Total Votes Cast
County	#	%	#	%	#	%	#	%	#	%	Total Votes Cast
Allegany	8550	52.91%	6306	39.02%	962	5.95%	341	2.11%	2244	13.89%	16159
Anne Arundel	4666	47.80%	4600	47.13%	115	1.18%	380	3.89%	66	0.68%	9761
Baltimore (City)	93646	47.25%	75288	37.99%	4115	2.08%	25139	12.68%	18358	9.26%	198188
Baltimore (County)	8525	43.73%	9616	49.33%	195	1.00%	1158	5.94%	-1091	-5.60%	19494
Calvert	1511	55.25%	1046	38.24%	22	0.80%	156	5.70%	465	17.00%	2735
Caroline	2393	43.62%	2941	53.61%	45	0.82%	107	1.95%	-548	-9.99%	5486
Carroll	4877	51.08%	4461	46.72%	28	0.29%	182	1.91%	416	4.36%	9548
Cecil	2614	41.79%	3434	54.90%	24	0.38%	183	2.93%	-820	-13.11%	6255
Charles	2400	56.06%	1658	38.73%	45	1.05%	178	4.16%	742	17.33%	4281
Dorchester	3582	45.68%	4089	52.14%	28	0.36%	143	1.82%	-507	-6.47%	7842
Frederick	8588	51.58%	7695	46.21%	91	0.55%	277	1.66%	893	5.36%	16651
Garrett	2140	66.46%	955	29.66%	58	1.80%	67	2.08%	1185	36.80%	3220
Harford	3085	40.97%	4095	54.39%	42	0.56%	307	4.08%	-1010	-13.41%	7529
Howard	2230	46.80%	2391	50.18%	17	0.36%	127	2.67%	-161	-3.38%	4765
Kent	2351	43.41%	2745	50.68%	40	0.74%	280	5.17%	-394	-7.27%	5416
Montgomery	4993	42.85%	6440	55.27%	84	0.72%	135	1.16%	-1447	-12.42%	11652
Prince George's	5797	52.79%	4802	43.73%	82	0.75%	301	2.74%	995	9.06%	10982
Queen Anne's	1959	36.11%	3317	61.14%	48	0.88%	101	1.86%	-1358	-25.03%	5425
St. Mary's	1802	50.03%	1643	45.61%	38	1.05%	119	3.30%	159	4.41%	3602
Somerset	3103	50.78%	2887	47.24%	11	0.18%	110	1.80%	216	3.53%	6111
Talbot	2898	46.86%	3136	50.70%	30	0.49%	121	1.96%	-238	-3.85%	6185
Washington	6997	47.33%	7146	48.34%	354	2.39%	286	1.93%	-149	-1.01%	14783
Wicomico	3590	41.08%	4932	56.44%	50	0.57%	166	1.90%	-1342	-15.36%	8738
Worcester	2702	42.21%	3577	55.87%	35	0.55%	88	1.37%	-875	-13.67%	6402
Total	184999	47.29%	169200	43.25%	6559	1.68%	30452	7.78%	15799	4.04%	391210

==== Counties that flipped from Republican to Democratic ====
- Dorchester
- Wicomico
- Worcester

==== Counties that flipped from Democratic to Republican ====
- Anne Arundel
- Carroll
- Prince George's

== See also ==
- 1920 United States Senate elections
- 1920 United States elections
