= Ovington Weller =

American politician (1862–1947)

Ovington Eugene Weller
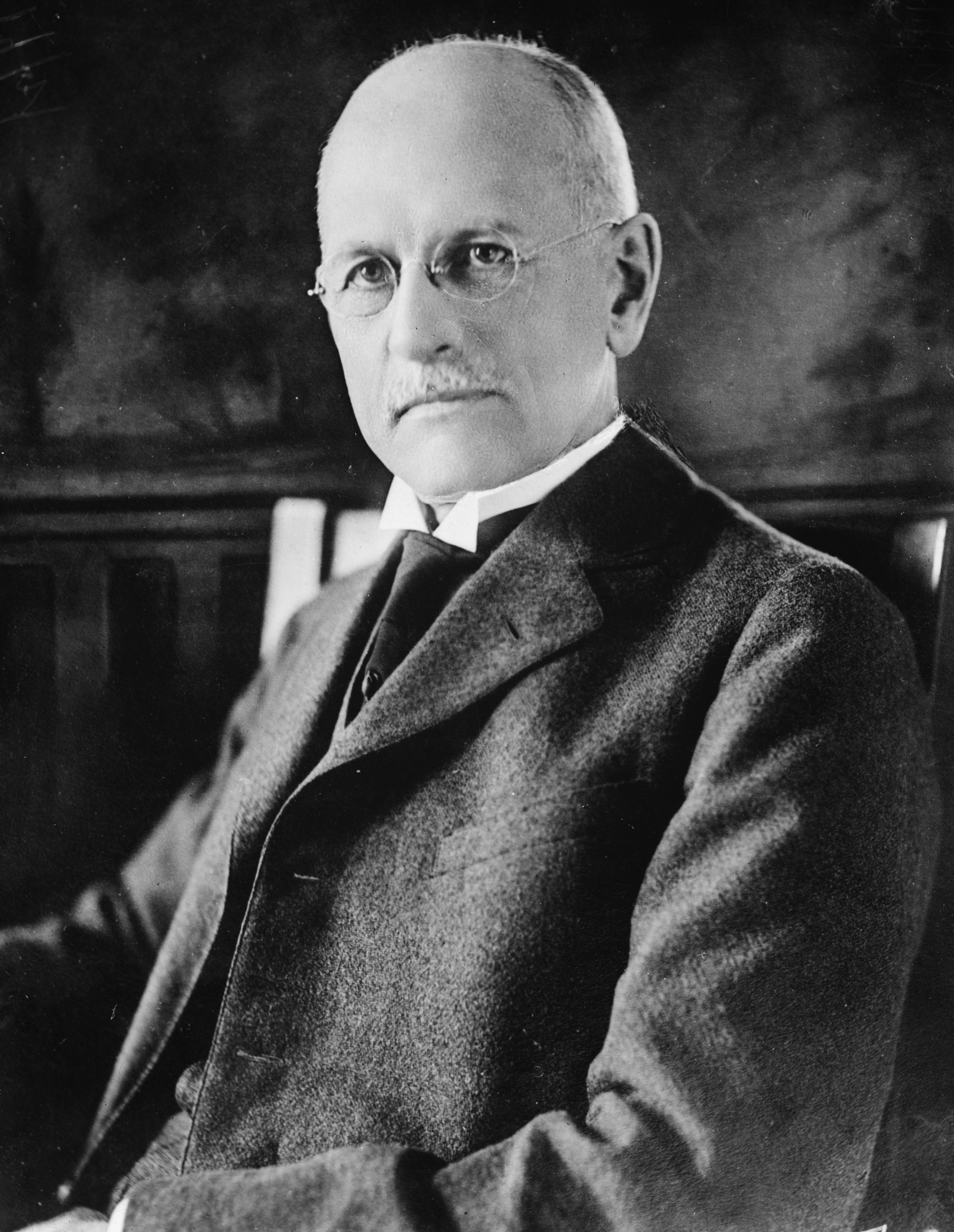

United States Senator from Maryland
- In office March 4, 1921 – March 4, 1927
- Preceded by: John W. Smith
- Succeeded by: Millard Tydings

Personal details
- Born: January 23, 1862 Reisterstown, Maryland, U.S.
- Died: January 5, 1947 (aged 84) Baltimore, Maryland, U.S.
- Resting place: Arlington National Cemetery; Arlington, Virginia, U.S.
- Party: Republican
- Spouse: Elizabeth Bailey (died 1934)
- Children: 1
- Education: United States Naval Academy; National Law School (LLB)

Ovington Eugene Weller (January 23, 1862 – January 5, 1947) was an American banker and Republican member of the United States Senate, representing the State of Maryland from 1921 to 1927.

== Early life ==
Ovington Eugene Weller was born on January 23, 1862, in Reisterstown, Maryland, to Wilmina (née Berryman) and William F. Weller. He graduated from Franklin High School in 1877. He graduated from the United States Naval Academy in 1881 and was president of his class. After two years of service in the United States Navy, he was honorably discharged in 1883.

Following his service in the Navy, Weller enrolled at the National Law School in Washington, D.C., in 1883. While attending school, he was employed as a clerk in the Post Office Department in Washington, D.C. from 1883 to 1887. He graduated in 1887 with a Bachelor of Laws and was admitted to the bar in 1888.

== Career ==
Weller practiced law from 1888 to 1891 in Wichita, Kansas. He worked in banking and manufacturing, and was a member of a stock brokerage firm until retiring in 1901.

Weller was appointed as chairman of the State Roads Commission of Maryland in 1912 by Governor Phillips Lee Goldsborough. He served in the role until 1915. He ran as Republican party candidate in the 1915 Maryland gubernatorial election, but was defeated by Democratic candidate Emerson C. Harrington by a margin of 3,181 votes.

Weller was treasurer of the Republican National Senatorial Committee from 1918 to 1920 until he was elected to the United States Senate in 1920, defeating incumbent John Walter Smith. He served from March 4, 1921, to March 3, 1927. He was chairman of the U.S. Senate Committee on Manufactures. He unsuccessfully tried for re-election in 1926, losing his position to Millard Tydings. Following his election in 1934, Governor Harry Nice appointed Weller as chairman of the Public Service Commission and served from 1935 to 1940. He was delegate-at-large at the 1916, 1924 and 1936 Republican National Conventions. He was a member of the Republican National Committee in 1932, 1936 and 1940.

Weller resumed the practice of law in Baltimore in 1926 and continued practicing until his death. He was also affiliated with law firms in Boston and New York.

== Personal life ==
Weller married Elizabeth Bailey of Baltimore County around 1888. They had a son, Felton Parker. His wife died in 1934. In the 1930s, he lived in Silver Spring. After Weller retired, he traveled extensively.

Weller died on January 5, 1947, at Johns Hopkins Hospital in Baltimore. He is buried in Arlington National Cemetery in Arlington, Virginia.

Party political offices
Preceded by Phillips Lee Goldsborough	Republican nominee for Governor of Maryland; 1915	Succeeded by Harry Nice
Preceded by Edward C Carrington Jr.	Republican nominee for U.S. Senator from Maryland (Class 3); 1920, 1926	Succeeded by Wallace Williams
U.S. Senate
Preceded by John Walter Smith	U.S. senator (Class 3) from Maryland; 1921–1927; Served alongside: Joseph Irwin France, William Cabell Bruce	Succeeded by Millard Tydings
